= Energy in Kazakhstan =

Energy in Kazakhstan describes energy and electricity production, consumption and import in Kazakhstan and the politics of Kazakhstan related to energy.

Kazakhstan, which has oil, gas, coal and uranium reserves, is a net energy exporter and a leading energy producer in the Commonwealth of Independent States (CIS). It is a major producer of oil, gas, and coal, as well as being the largest producer and exporter of uranium ore in the world. Kazakhstan's oil and gas industry has been intensively developing after 1999. China is one of the biggest investors in Kazakhstan's oil and gas industry. Kazakhstan 2050 Strategy commits to 50% of energy consumption coming from renewable or alternative sources by 2050.

Energy in Kazakhstan
	Population (million)	Primary energy (TWh)	Production (TWh)	Export (TWh)	Electricity (TWh)	CO_{2}-emission (Mt)
2004	15.0	638	1,379	742	54.4	162.2
2007	15.5	773	1,582	811	68.9	190.5
2008	15.7	825	1,723	899	73.5	201.6
2009	15.9	766	1,696	931	71.6	189.5
2012	16.6	908	1,863	972	81.0	234.2
2012R	16.79	871	1,915	1,023	85.4	225.8
2013	17.04	948	1,966	994	83.4	244.9
Change 2004-09	6.0%	20.1%	22.9%	25.6%	31.7%	16.9%
Mtoe = 11.63 TWh, Prim. energy includes energy losses. 2012R = CO2 calculation criteria changed, numbers updated

According to IEA primary energy supply increased 29% and energy export 21% from 2004 to 2008 in Kazakhstan.

== Energy by sources ==
In 2018 about half of energy was from coal and about a quarter each from oil and natural gas. Kazakhstan started looking for ways to use its renewable energy sources. In 2015, an action plan was adopted on the development of renewable energy for the period of 2013 to 2020. Also in 2015, Kazakhstan Investment and Development Minister announced that the country would establish a special fund engaged in financing energy-saving programs. In 2016, Kazakhstan significantly increased the installed capacity of renewable energy facilities, which totaled 251.55 megawatts. It is 1.4 times more than in the same period of 2015.

=== Oil ===
Oil Balance

Kazakhstan has estimated 30 billion barrels of oil reserves. With 172 oilfields, Kazakhstan possesses 3% of global oil reserves, putting it among the world's top 15 countries in terms of oil reserves. The main reserves are in five largest onshore oil fields of Tengiz – the largest oil producing field with 565,000 barrels per day of crude in 2011 - Karachaganak, Aktobe, Mangistau, and Uzen, all of which are located in the western part of the country. These hold half of current proven reserves. The offshore fields of Kashagan and Kurmanagazy in the Caspian Sea are estimated to hold minimum 14 million barrels. With 9 – 11 billion barrels, Kashagan is the largest oil field outside of the Middle East. It is estimated to come on stream in 2016 and reach production of 1.5 million barrels per day at its peak. Kazakhstan is a major oil producer with an estimated total production of 1.64 million barrels per day in 2013. The country consumes around 13 percent of the supply domestically and exports the rest to major oil markets. To continue expanding the liquids production above its current levels, the country needs to develop its Tengiz, Karachaganak, and Kashagan fields as well as add export capacity.

KazMunayGas (KMG), the national oil and gas company, was created in 2002 to represent the interests of the state in the oil and gas industry. The oil production development has been made possible largely due to significant foreign investment, primarily from the Netherlands and the US in the early 2000s. In 2010, the Kazakh government took away KMG's responsibility to regulate the sector to enable the company's higher level of involvement in the commercial sector. The government now reserves a majority stake for KMG in all new projects and joint ventures. KMG now controls 20 percent of total oil and gas proved reserves of Kazakhstan and produces 27 percent of total oil and gas condensate and 14 percent of gas.

Kazakhstan has three major refineries - Atyrau, Shymkent and Pavlodar. Their combined crude refining capacity amounts to around 350,000 barrels per day, roughly evenly split amongst the three. Due to aged infrastructure, they mostly operate only at 60 percent of their capacity. The government has made significant investment in the modernization of these units to be completed around 2016.

In mid-2016, a group of oil companies led by Chevron announced a $36.8 billion investment deal for the development of Kazakhstan's Tengiz oil field. According to experts, this investment may allow Kazakhstan to become a top 10 oil producer.

Kazakhstan decreased its oil production by 4.3% as part of the agreements reached with the OPEC +. OPEC+, which also includes non-OPEC allies, including Kazakhstan and Russia, agreed in April to a record global oil cut of 9.7 million barrels per day from May 1. In November 2020, the Kazakh Government confirmed that the country fulfilled the OPEC+ obligations by 99%.

Kazakhstan is estimated to have around 30 billion barrels (4.8×10^{9} m^{3}) of crude oil reserves. In 2018, this would make Kazakhstan twelfth in the amount of total proven oil reserves globally. When discovered in the 1990s, the Kashagan oil field was the second largest oil field in the world. In 2000s, the oil production has increased rapidly due to foreign investment and improvements in production efficiencies. In 2006, Kazakhstan produced 54 million tons of crude oil and 10.5 million tons of gas condensate 565,000,000 bbl (89,800,000 m^{3}), which makes Kazakhstan eighteenth-largest oil producer in the world. At these production levels Kazakhstan is thought to have approximately 50 years of remaining production. According to the president Nursultan Nazarbayev, Kazakhstan is planning to increase its oil production up to 3.5 million barrels (560,000 m^{3}) of oil a day, of which 3 million will go to export. This will lift Kazakhstan into the ranks of the world's top 10 oil-producing nations. The government views the oil and gas sector as strategically important for the economy and the share of state involvement in the management over petroleum resources remains high.

The main production sites are the Tengiz field 290,000 bbl/d (46,000 m^{3}/d), located on the northeast shores of the Caspian, and the Karachaganak field 210,000 bbl/d (33,000 m^{3}/d), located inland near to Russian border. In future Kazakh oil production will also rely on the Kashagan field, the largest oil field outside the Middle East, which possess anywhere from 7 Gbbl (1.1×10^{9} m^{3}) to 13 Gbbl (2.1×10^{9} m^{3}) in recoverable reserves, and the Kurmangazy field in Northern Kazakhstan. There are some smaller oil fields near the Chinese border, which are not developed/operational yet. 76% of Kazakhstan's oil and gas production and remaining reserves are concentrated in these three oil fields, as well as the Uzen Field. 14% of reserves and production are located in 6 further fields.

The leading oil industry is state-owned oil company KazMunayGas. The landmark foreign investment in Kazakh oil industry is the TengizChevroil joint venture, owned 50% by ChevronTexaco, 25% by ExxonMobil, 20% by the Government of Kazakhstan, and 5% by Lukarco of Russia. The Karachaganak natural gas and gas condensate field is being developed by BG, Agip, ChevronTexaco, and Lukoil. Also Chinese, Indian and Korean oil companies are involved in the Kazakhstan's oil industry.

Kazakhstan has three oil refineries: in Pavlodar, in Atyrau, and in Shymkent. Pavlodar and Shymkent refineries process West Siberian crude oil, which is imported through the Omsk (Russia) - Pavlodar (Kazakhstan) - Shymkent - Türkmenabat (Turkmenistan) pipeline.

==== Recent developments ====
The Kazakhstan 2022 review by the International Energy Agency (IEA) warned that overreliance on oil routes poses short-term risks amid regional instability and sanctions against Russia. Export disruptions in recent years highlighted the need for diversifying oil transit options to ensure economic stability.

In April 2025, President Kassym-Jomart Tokayev met with Chevron CEO Michael Wirth to mark the completion of the Tengiz field expansion. They discussed deepening long-term cooperation, boosting local participation, and advancing projects like a 4.5 bcm/year gas processing plant at Karachaganak and a major polyethylene complex. These efforts aim to increase domestic value-added production and reduce dependency on crude exports alone.

The IEA also emphasized pricing reforms in Kazakhstan’s gas sector, where regulated low prices discourage producers from selling domestically. Instead, gas is often re-injected to boost oil output for export. Pricing reform could support diversification and reduce coal reliance.

Kazakhstan is also leveraging its uranium sector to support clean energy goals. In April 2025, Kazatomprom signed a long-term deal with ČEZ to supply uranium to the Temelín nuclear power plant, covering up to one-third of its needs over seven years. This agreement strengthens Kazakhstan’s position in the European energy market and supports its clean energy transition.

=== Natural gas ===
Kazakhstan's proved natural gas reserves totaled 85 trillion cubic feet as of January 1, 2025. The majority of the natural gas reserves are in the west of Kazakhstan and concentrated in four fields – Karachanganak (46 percent), Tengiz (12 percent), Imashevskoye (7 percent) and Kashagan (12 percent). Between 2000 and 2012 natural gas production increased four times to 40.1 billion cubic meters in 2012. However, only 53 percent of this gas was for commercial purposes; the rest was re-injected into oil fields to enhance production.

Kazakhstan's gas production suffices to meet domestic demand of 10.5 billion cubic meters (2012). However, due to limited internal gas pipeline network that does not connect all the production centers (west) with demand centers (south, east, north), the country needs to import gas from Uzbekistan to satisfy the demand in the south of the country, and from Russia to satisfy demand in the north and east. In 2012, the country exported 8.8 billion cubic meters of gas to China through the Central Asia – China pipeline. Kazakhstan serves as a major transit country for gas exports from Turkmenistan and Uzbekistan that are destined to Russia and China. In 2012, the amount of gas transited through Kazakhstan was 96.5 billion cubic meters.

Kazakhstan's domestic hydrocarbon reserves amount to 3.3–3.7 trillion cubic metres of gas, of which 2.5 tcm are proven. However, Kazakhstan became a net gas exporter only in 2003. In 2007, Kazakhstan produced 29 bcm of natural gas and plans to increase its gas output to 60–80 bcm a year by 2015. The major natural gas fields are Karachaganak, Tengiz, Kashagan, Amangeldy, Zhanazhol, Urikhtau and Chinarevskoye. Kazakhstan's major gas company is KazMunaiGaS JSC, which has a reported annual income of about $3 billion in 2013.

=== Coal ===
Coal Balance

Kazakhstan sits on Central Asia's largest recoverable coal reserves. At 33.6 billion tonnes the reserves represent 3.8 percent of global total reserves. (2013). In 2013, the country produced 58.4 million tonnes. Coal production stands at 70 percent of what it was during the Soviet Union. The largest coal producer is Bogatyr Coal that operates the largest 4.5 billion tons open-pit coal mine in the world in Ekibastuz in the northeastern region of Kazakhstan. In 2012 Bogatyr Coal produced 46 million tons of coal.

Majority of coal, 75 percent, is used for domestic consumption, power generation in particular. The largest importers of Kazakhstan's oil include the neighboring southern Russia and Ukraine.

A major concern of the coal mines of Kazakhstan is safety and prevention and control of mine explosions.

In 2009 Kazakhstan was 8. top coal producer: 96 million tonnes hard coal and 5 million tonnes brown coal. 22 Mt of hard coal was exported (2009). In 2009 Kazakhstan was world 8. top coal exporter. The top hard coal net exporters in 2009 were (Mt): Australia 262, Indonesia 230, Russia 93, Colombia 69, South Africa 67, United States 33, Vietnam 25, Kazakhstan 22, Canada 20 and Czech Republic 4. The coal of Kazakhstan has low energy value 0.444 toe/tonne compared to e.g. in this respect top coal of Australia 0.689 toe/tonne.

Assuming both hard coal 96 Mt and brown coal 6 Mt having about the same energy value,: the coal production would have been about 101 Mt*0.444 toe/Mt*11.630 TWh/toe = 521 TWh in 2009 and export .22*0.444 toe/Mt*11.630 TWh/toe = 114 TWh.

Although Kazakhstan is a substantial producer of oil and gas, coal has dominated both energy production and consumption. It contains Central Asia's largest recoverable coal reserves, with 34.5 billion short tons of mostly anthracitic and bituminous coal. Major coal fields are Bogatyr and Severny. In 2005, Kazakhstan was the 9th biggest producer of coal in the world, and the 10th global exporter. Russia is the largest importer of Kazakh coal, followed by Ukraine. The biggest coal production company is Bogatyr Access Komir, which accounts for approximately 35% of Kazakh coal output.

== Electricity ==
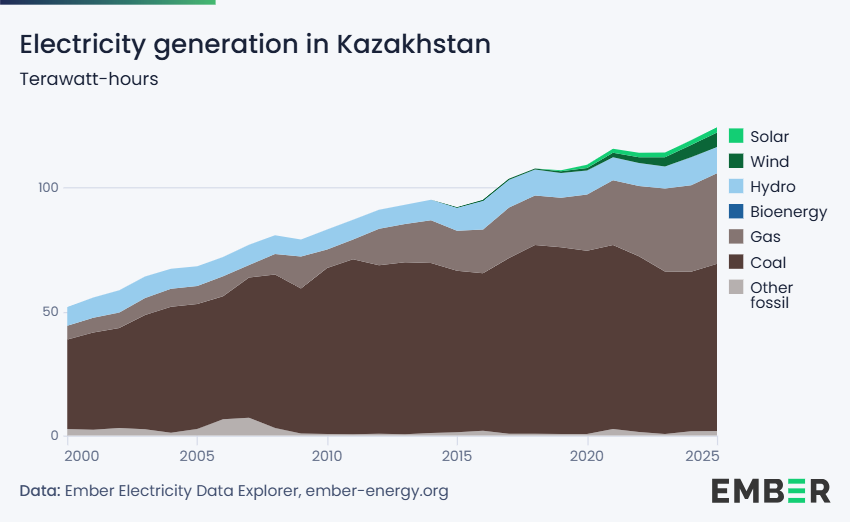
Electricity generation in Kazakhstan in terawatt-hours

An executive order directs that renewables sources supply 15% of Kazakhstan's total energy grid by 2030. If achieved, the domestic energy and labor sectors would be reshaped.

In 2013, the country produced 93.76 billion kWH - 70 billion kWh (81%) from coal, 8 from gas and 8 from hydro. The country has 71 power stations, including 5 hydro power plants located on the Irtysh river, which translates to total installed generating capacity of 19.6 GW. 75 percent of electricity generated is consumed by industry, 11 percent by households, 2 percent by transportation.

Kazakhstan largest solar power station "Burboye Solar-1" LLP was commissioned in July 2015. Since then during a year of operation the solar power station produced over 38.4 million kWh. Besides "Burboye Solar-1", the Zhambyl region implements nine projects of alternative energy sources.

In 2021 it was the 3rd largest Bitcoin miner.

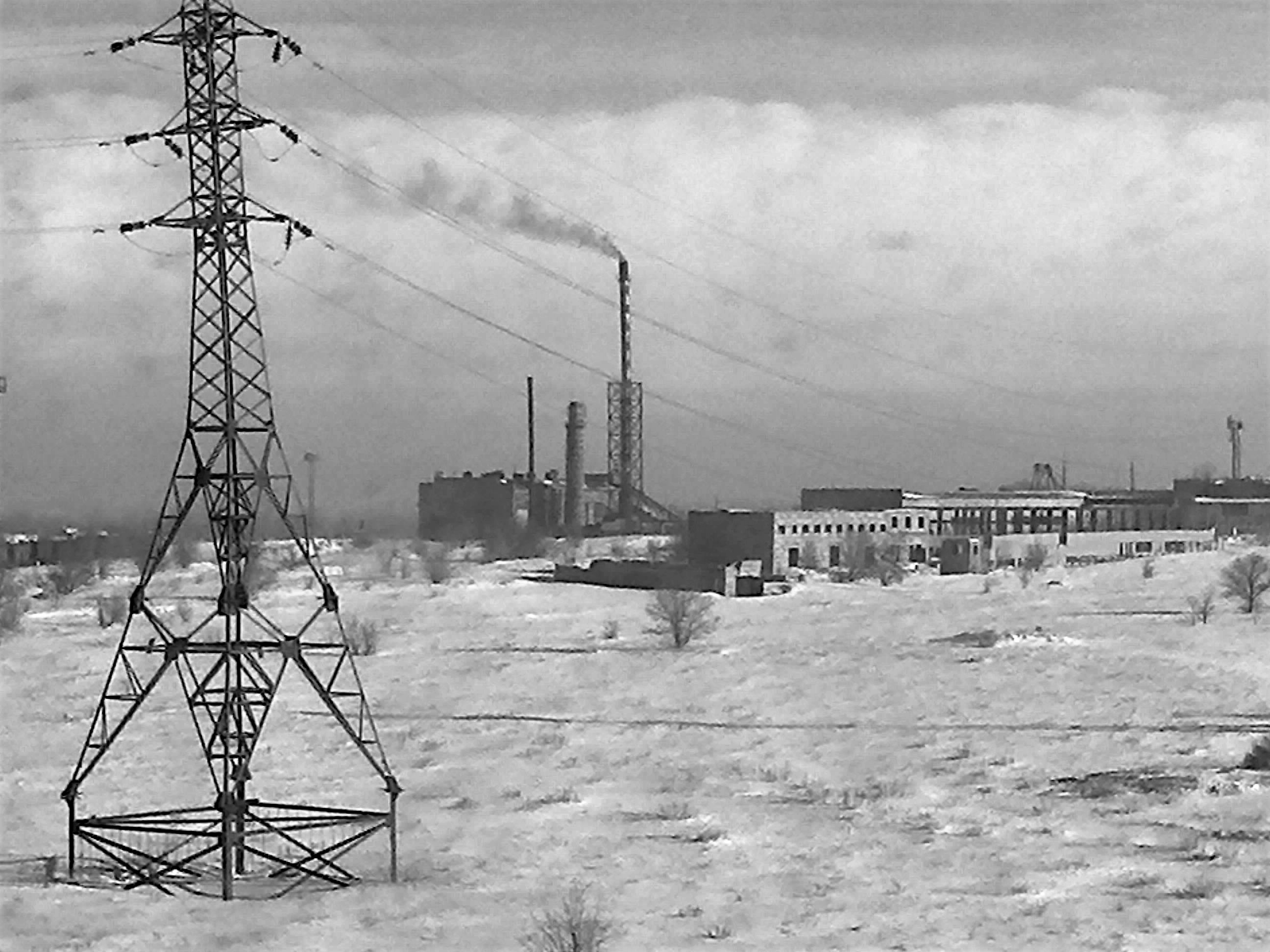
View from the bridge at the Kirovskaya mine in Kazakhstan

== Policy ==
Kazakhstan owns large reserves of energy resources. Although Kazakhstan has not described itself as an energy superpower, Kazakhstan's former president Nursultan Nazarbayev claimed Kazakhstan will become a factor of energy security in Asia and Europe. Kazakhstan has a strategic geographical location to control oil and gas flows from Central Asia to East (China) and West (Russia, EU, global market).

Kazakhstan was a partner country of the EU INOGATE energy programme, which had four key topics: enhancing energy security, convergence of member state energy markets on the basis of EU internal energy market principles, supporting sustainable energy development, and attracting investment for energy projects of common and regional interest.

In 2013 Kazakhstan became the first country in Central Asia to launch an economy-wide carbon emissions system to cap emissions from its biggest emitters in the energy, coal, oil and gas extraction sectors.

=== Overview ===
The Ministry of Energy and Mineral Resources was the responsible governmental agency for energy policies until March 2010 when it was dissolved and replaced by the Ministry of Oil and Gas and the Ministry for Industry and New Technologies.

In June 2003, the government of Kazakhstan announced a new Caspian Sea development program, according to which new offshore blocks of oil and gas to be auctioned. In 2005, the government introduced new restrictions granting to the state-owned oil and gas company KazMunayGas status of contractor and at least half of any production sharing agreement (PSA). New tax structure, enforced in January 2004, included a so-called "rent tax" on exports, a progressive tax that increases as oil prices grow. The amendment raised the government's share of oil income to a range of 65-85%.The new structure includes an excess profit tax, and limits foreign participation to 50 percent in each offshore project with no guarantees of operatorship.

In 2005, Kazakhstan amended the subsoil law to preempt the sale of oil assets in the country and to extend the government’s power to buy back energy assets by limiting the transfer of property rights to strategic assets in Kazakhstan.

In 2013, Kazakhstan adopted the Energy Efficiency 2020 Program that would reduce emission 10% every year until 2015. Adopted by Prime Minister Serik Akhmetov, this new law would help reduce emissions and help with energy efficient solutions from large companies to small families. 2,000 industrial enterprises would be energy audits to meet with the new law. The program in the long run reduces the amount of energy per square meter by 30% and reduce costs by 14%.

The idea of building a nuclear power plant gained great prominence among the Government members during the early 2020s. In June 2024, President Kassym-Jomart Tokayev announced, that a referendum regarding the issue is to be held in autumn. The nuclear power plant is planned to be built in Ülken, Jambyl District, Almaty Region.

=== Primary energy sources ===
Kazakhstan oil, gas, coal and uranium reserves are among the ten biggest in the world.

==== Uranium ====
Kazakhstan is the number one country in the world for uranium production volumes, and it owns the world second biggest uranium reserves after Australia (around 1.5 million tons or nearly 19% of the explored reserves of uranium in the world). In 2012 Kazakhstan produced 20,900 metric tons of uranium, of which 11,900 metric tons were produced by Kazatomprom, a state-owned holding company (2011: 19,450 total / 11,079 Kazatomprom). Kazatomprom also represents Kazakhstan in the joint ventures with Russian Tekhsnabexport, French AREVA and Canadian Cameco.

All of produced uranium is going for export as the country's only nuclear power plant in Aktau was shut down in June 1999. There is a plan to build a new 1,500 MW nuclear plant in the southeast of Kazakhstan, near Lake Balkash.

According to the mayor, Kyzylorda is planning to produce two-thirds of Kazakhstan's uranium by 2015.

In 2014, Kazakhstan and the IAEA would sign an agreement to establish a low-enriched uranium fuel bank. The bank would be a place for countries to contribute uranium and disperse it to other nations safely for energy means with the IAEA being the governing body.

In August 2013, IAEA Director General Yukiya Amano visited Kazakhstan to further discussions on the fuel bank and praised Kazakhstan's contribution to nuclear non-proliferation.

In 2012, Secretary of State Hillary Clinton said during a meeting with Kazakhstan's Foreign Minister Erlan Idrissov in Washington, "We view Kazakhstan not only as a regional player, but also as a global leader. Few countries can be compared to Kazakhstan in terms of its experience in non-proliferation."

Kazakhstan announced in January 2017 that the country was planning to cut its production of uranium by 10% due to a global oversupply of the commodity. According to Kazatomprom, state-owned uranium company and global production leader, even with the announced output cuts, Kazakhstan will continue to be the world’s No.1 uranium producer.

=== Electricity ===
The Law on Electricity was adopted in July 2004. Another basic act regulating electricity market is the Law on Natural Monopolies, which was last amended in December 2004. The market regulator is the Agency for Regulation of Natural Monopolies (ANMR).

Kazakhstan's electricity system includes 71 power plants with total installed capacity of 18,572 MW. the largest power plant is a coal-fired AES Ekibastuz GRES-2 in north-central Kazakhstan.

86.5% of electric power generation has been privatized. The government does not regulate prices for electricity, and consumers have free choice among providers of electric power (currently there is 15 licensed electricity traders). Transmission system is owned and operated by the state-owned company KEGOC. As of 1 January 2006, the total length of transmission lines was 23,383 km. There are 18 regional distribution (sale) companies. Government regulates transmission and distribution tariffs.

==== Renewable energy ====
Kazakhstan possesses 5 operational hydroelectric plants which provide roughly 12% of the electricity generation. The majority of the facilities are located on the Irtysh River. Other renewables are largely undeveloped although Kazakhstan has potential in renewable energy resources. Renewable energy sources could be particularly attractive in isolated rural areas.

===== Wind =====
A planned 100 MW wind farm, one of the largest in Central Asia, is expected to be constructed in 2020 in Zhanatas with funding support from the Asian Infrastructure Investment Bank.

==== Nuclear energy ====
Kazakhstan currently has no nuclear power generation capacity, as the Aktau nuclear reactor, the country's only nuclear power plant, was shut down in June 1999. However, there is currently a plan to build a new 1,500 MW nuclear plant in the southeast of Kazakhstan, near Lake Balkash.

=== Energy transportation ===
Kazakhstan's oil pipeline system is operated by KazTransOil which was formed in 1997 when the two previous oil pipeline companies were combined. It is owed 100% by KazMunaiGaz which is also the owner of KazTransGaz which along with KazRosGaz are the two principle gas transportation companies. KazRosGaz is a joint venture between KazMunaiGaz and Gazprom which is involved in the export and trade of gas with Russia.

==== Oil pipelines ====
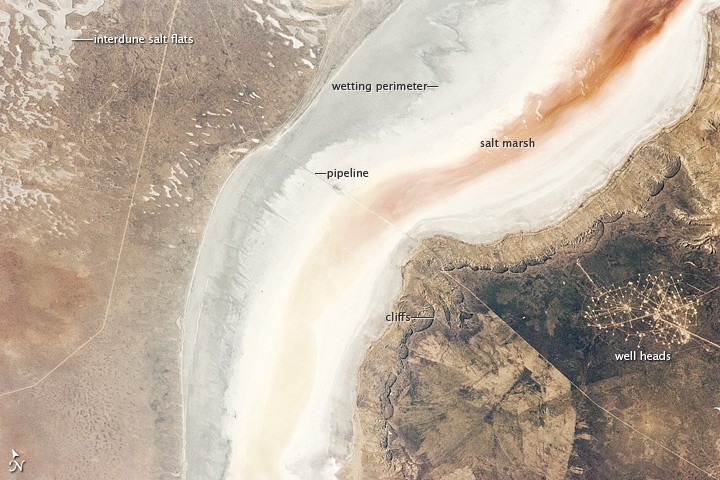
Sor Kaydak, Caspian Sea, Kazakhstan - NASA Earth Observatory

Main oil export routes are the Caspian Pipeline Consortium and the Atyrau-Samara oil pipeline to Russia, and Kazakhstan-China oil pipeline to China. Kazakhstan is also a transit country for the Omsk (Russia) -Pavlodar (Kazakhstan) -Shymkent - Türkmenabat (Turkmenistan) pipeline. The Baku-Tbilisi-Ceyhan pipeline and Neka in Iran could be supplied by oil tankers. In addition, for the export to neighboring countries the rail transport is used.

The Kazakhstan oil infrastructure is considered to be in poor condition which has constrained possible exports. Currently exports excluding the Caspian Pipeline Consortium is limited to 500,000 bbl/d (79,000 m^{3}/d). Kazakhstan is also further hampered as the oil pipeline infrastructure is not set up to transport oil from the producing assets in the west to the main refineries located in the east of the country. The CPC provides an important outlet for Kazakhstan oil and it is expected that it will be up graded so as to export close to 15,000,000 bbl/d (2,400,000 m^{3}/d).

==== Natural gas pipelines ====
The natural gas trunk pipeline system stretches 10,138 kilometers. The major transit pipelines are the Central Asia-Center gas pipeline system and the Bukhara-Urals pipeline, which transport natural gas from Turkmenistan and Uzbekistan to Russia, and Orenburg-Novopskov pipeline and Soyuz pipeline from Orenburg processing plant to Europe. The Gazli-Bishkek pipeline transports natural gas from Uzbekistan to Kyrgyzstan. The Central Asia-Center and the Bukhara-Urals pipelines as also the Bukhara-Tashkent-Bishkek-Almaty pipeline are also main import pipelines. The main gas export goes to Orenburg processing plant in Russia. The export to Russia goes also through the Central Asia-Center and the Bukhara-Urals pipelines. There is plan to build a natural gas pipeline to China. To supply this pipeline, the Ishim (Rudny)-Petropavlovsk-Kokshetau-Astana pipeline is planned.

=== International cooperation ===
In general, various international organizations have played an important role in advising and assisting Kazakhstan's government in its energy sector reform and natural resource management.

==== Kazakhstan - the European Union ====
Kazakhstan signed the European Energy Charter on December 17, 1991, the nation's first day of independence from the former Soviet Union. On 4 December 2006, Kazakhstan and the European Union signed a Memorandum of Understanding (MoU), which sets the framework for deeper energy cooperation. The memorandum establishes road maps on energy security and industrial cooperation. It was accompanied by a co-operation agreement to develop nuclear trade.

==== Kazakhstan - Russia ====
Kazakhstan and Russia have close cooperation on energy issues. On 3 October 2006 during the presidents' meeting in Oral, Kazakhstan and Russia agreed to set up a gas-condensate-processing joint venture between Gazprom and KazMunayGas in Orenburg, which will be supplied from the Karachaganak field. The gas supply agreement was signed on 10 May 2007 in Astana.

On 7 December 2006, the Kazakhstan's Minister of Energy and Mineral Resources Baktykozha Izmukhambetov and the chief of the Russian Federal Atomic Energy Agency Sergei Kiriyenko signed an agreement, in which Russia pledged to assist Kazakhstan in its nuclear program in return for shipments of uranium from Kazakhstan to Russia, where the uranium will be enriched. In addition, President of Kazatomprom Moukhtar Dzhakishev, and director of Russian uranium trader Tekhsnabexport Vladimir Smirnov signed a deal in which Tekhsnabexport will provide information regarding construction, transportation and logistics to help Kazakhstan develop its nuclear program. Russia already agreed earlier in 2006 to help Kazakhstan build two nuclear power plants. On 10 May 2007, Russia and Kazakhstan agreed to set up an international uranium enrichment center in Angarsk, East Siberia. The center is planned to come on stream in 2013.

On 12 May 2007, Vladimir Putin of Russia, Nursultan Nazarbayev of Kazakhstan and Gurbanguly Berdimuhamedow of Turkmenistan signed an agreement providing for Central Asian gas to be exported to Europe through the reconstructed and expanded western branch of the Central Asia-Center gas pipeline system.

==== Kazakhstan - Extractive Industries Transparency Initiative (EITI) ====
On October 17, 2013 the International Board of the Extractive Industries Transparency Initiative (EITI) designated Kazakhstan “EITI Compliant”.

Clare Short, Chair of the EITI Board said, “Kazakhstan has reached an important milestone by becoming a full member of the EITI family. I hope that all parties will now work to ensure that this increase in transparency will lead to reform in the management of the extractive industries, bringing real benefits to the people of Kazakhstan and providing leadership in other countries in the region.”

==== Kazakhstan - IAEA ====
Kazakhstan and the International Atomic Energy Agency (IAEA) cooperated on several projects related to nuclear energy, agriculture, nuclear security, research, and others. Kazakhstan contributed to such projects of the IAEA as the development of nuclear power infrastructure and strengthening nuclear forensics. Kazakhstan also provided US $100 000 in extrabudgetary contributions for the renovation of the IAEA’s nuclear applications research laboratories.

===== Low Enriched Uranium Bank =====
On August 27, 2015, an agreement to locate the IAEA LEU Bank in Kazakhstan was signed in the country's capital Astana. The bank was inaugurated on August 29, 2017, and is located at Ulba Metallurgical Plant. It is a physical reserve of up to 90 metric tons of LEU, sufficient to run a 1,000 MWe light-water reactor. Such a reactor can power a large city for three years. The facility was wholly funded by IAEA member states and other contributions for a total of $150 million. This is expected to cover costs for 20 years.

In October 2019, the Ulba bank received its first shipment of 32 canisters of LEU fuel.
