= Caspian Pipeline Consortium =

Russia-Kazakhstan Oil Pipeline

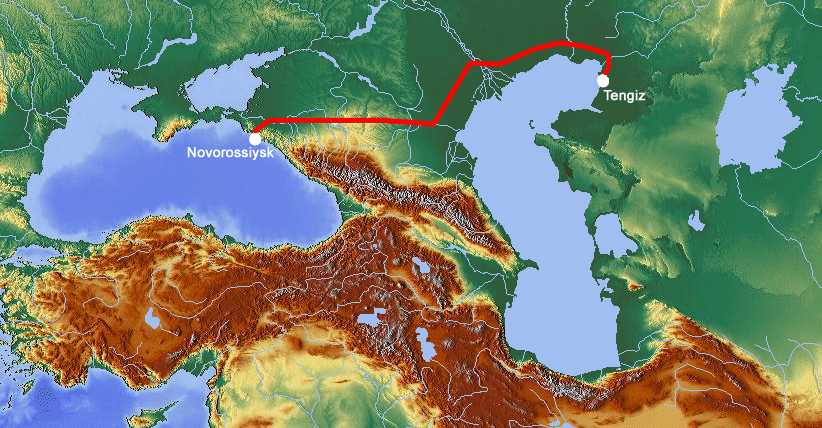
- Location of Caspian Pipeline Consortium

Location
- Country: Kazakhstan, Russia
- Direction: east to west
- Start: Tengiz field, Kazakhstan
- To: Novorossiysk, Russia

General information
- Type: oil
- Partners: Transneft; Government of Kazakhstan; Chevron Caspian Pipeline Consortium Co.; LukArco; Mobil Caspian Pipeline Co.; Rosneft – Shell Caspian Ventures Ltd.; Agip International (N.A.) N.V.; Oryx Caspian Pipeline LLC; BG Overseas Holdings Ltd.; Kazakhstan Pipeline Ventures LLC (KazMunayGas and BP)
- Operator: CPC-R, CPC-K
- Commissioned: 2001

Technical information
- Length: 1,510 km (940 mi)
- Maximum discharge: 1,400,000 barrels per day (220,000 m^{3}/d)

The Caspian Pipeline Consortium (CPC) is a consortium and an oil pipeline that transports Caspian oil from the Tengiz oil field in Kazakhstan to the Novorossiysk-2 Marine Terminal, an export terminal at the Russian Black Sea port of Novorossiysk. It is one of the world's largest pipelines and a major export route for oil from the Kashagan and Karachaganak fields. The CPC pipeline transfers about 1% of global oil supply and handles almost all of Kazakhstan's oil exports. In 2021, the pipeline exported up to 1.3 million barrels per day (bpd) of Kazakhstan's main crude grade, light sour CPC Blend, which represented 80% of Kazakhstan's total oil production of 1.6 million bpd.

The pipeline's largest shareholders include Chevron and Exxon. As of 2009, the CPC pipeline was the only oil export pipeline in Russian territory not wholly owned by Transneft.

== History ==
The CPC was established on 17 July 1992 by Kazakhstan and Oman, soon joined by Russia, to build a dedicated pipeline from the Tengiz Field, developed by Chevron, to export routes on the Black Sea, bypassing the Russian pipeline network, which had limited capacity for Kazakh oil. A separate export pipeline was a priority for Kazakh President Nursultan Nazarbayev. Chevron was asked to join, but talks broke down over the high financial burden it would bear relative to its equity; with the founding states lacking funds and disputing their shares, the project stalled for several years.

In April 1996 a protocol signed in Almaty restructured the project to include eight production companies. The shareholder agreement was based on Nazarbayev's "ten principles of partnership", chief among them to "split the apple in half": the companies received a 50% stake in exchange for fully financing construction. Kazakhstan's negotiator was oil and gas minister Nurlan Balgimbayev. The agreement was signed on 6 December 1996 at Moscow's Hotel Metropol: Russia received 24%, Kazakhstan 19% and Oman 7%, while the companies' half went to Chevron (15%), LukArco (12.5%), Rosneft-Shell (7.5%), Mobil (7.5%), Agip (2%), British Gas (2%), Kazakhstan Pipeline Ventures (1.75%) and Oryx (1.75%).

Construction finance was unlocked only after Nazarbayev met Russian President Boris Yeltsin in Moscow on 24 April 1997; the next day Yeltsin decreed tax and currency benefits for the consortium's Russian arm, and Nazarbayev issued a matching currency decree. The production companies financed the construction cost of US$2.67 billion (estimated at $2.2 billion in 1997), while Russia and Kazakhstan contributed the existing Tengiz–Grozny pipeline, with Russia's unused pipeline assets valued at US$293 million. BP joined the consortium in 2003.

In April 2007, the Russian government transferred its shares to the Russian state-owned oil pipeline company Transneft. In October 2008, the Government of Oman sold its 7% stake to Transneft at a price of $700 million and withdrew from the project. On 17 December 2008, a memorandum on expanding the pipeline was signed.

On October 14, 2016, crude oil from the Kashagan Field in Kazakhstan first started flowing into the Caspian Pipeline Consortium's system.

On April 18, 2018, the last pump station of CPC Expansion Project, PS-2 in Kalmykia, was put into permanent operation.

On May 21, 2019, the annual meeting of CPC shareholders adopted the Bottleneck Elimination Program (BEP), which provides for expansion of the Tengiz–Novorossiysk oil pipeline capacity to at least 72.5 million tons per year.

== Technical features ==
The diameter of the 1,510 kilometres (940 mi) long oil pipeline varies between 1,016 millimetres (40.0 in) and 1,067 millimetres (42.0 in). There are five pumping stations. The marine terminal includes two single point moorings and the tank farm consists of four steel storage tanks of 100,000 cubic metres (3,500,000 cu ft) each. Pipeline throughflow started at 350,000 barrels per day (56,000 m^{3}/d) and has since increased to 700,000 barrels per day (110,000 m^{3}/d).

The second stage reached a capacity of 1.4 million barrels per day (220,000 m^{3}/d). As of 2022, the pipeline throughput was about 1.2 million barrels per day (190,000 m^{3}/d), about 1.2% of global oil demand.

== Operations ==
In 2008, CPC transported 31.5 million tons of crude, down from 32.6 million tonnes in 2007. In the first three months of 2009, the pipeline transported 8.7 million tonnes of oil.

From 2001 to April 31, 2020, the Tengiz–Novorossiysk pipeline system carried 662,784,671 tons of net oil to world markets. Of this, 582,814,809 tons was from Kazakhstan and 85,295,642 tons was produced in Russia. The total number of tankers processed during this period was 6,287.

In March 2022, two of the three pipeline-connected ship berths at the Port of Novorossiysk suffered storm damage. Repairs were expected to take up to two months, with exports falling by up to 1 million barrels per day.

On 6 July 2022, a Russian court ordered the suspension of the pipeline for 30 days over oil spills. The CPC appealed the ruling and the suspension was lifted on 11 July of the following week, and the CPC was fined 200,000 rubles (US$3,300). Despite the July 6 ruling, the operator of Kazakhstan's Tengiz oil field, Tengizchevroil, said that the transfer of oil through the CPC had not been interrupted since immediate suspension of the pipeline was technically impossible and would have resulted in "irreversible consequences".

The CPC pipeline carries most of Kazakhstan's oil exports, which makes the country's oil supply routes heavily dependent on Russia. In addition, about 15% of the rest of Kazakhstan's oil exports are also transferred through Russia (while about 5% is sent to China or to various other destinations over rail and the Caspian Sea). After the 6 July suspension of the pipeline, Kazakhstan's President Kassym-Jomart Tokayev ordered the government of his country to diversify its oil supply routes.

In November 2024 the International Consortium of Investigative Journalists and 26 media partners published the report "Caspian Cabals" to put public interests on environmental damage, but also to allegations of financial corruption and geopolitical threats.

As part of a new sanctions package against Russia imposed on 10 January 2025, the U.S. Department of the Treasury granted exemptions for oilfield services related to the CPC.

== Attacks ==
On 17 February 2025, on the eve of talks between the U.S. and Russian officials on ending the war in Ukraine, a drone attack by the Ukrainian Air Force on a pumping station damaged energy equipment, a gas turbine unit, and a substation. Flows through the CPC were reduced by 30–40%. The station was expected to be restored within one-and-a-half to two months.

On November 29, one of the three mooring points on the CPC pier was damaged as a result of a maritime drone attack. CPC reported that no oil leaked into the Black Sea and that operations at the terminal were suspended. In connection with the incident, the Ministry of Foreign Affairs of Kazakhstan expressed a protest, stating that it was "already the third act of aggression" against an "exclusively civilian object" and that such actions damage Kazakhstan's bilateral relations with Ukraine. Ukraine’s Foreign Ministry essentially acknowledged responsibility for the strikes on the CPC terminal, rebuked Kazakhstan for what it sees as an insufficiently firm stance toward Russia, and signaled that it considers collateral damage on Russian territory to be quite acceptable. However, according to the Carnegie Berlin Center, these attacks inflict relatively limited economic damage on Russia while threatening tens of billions in revenue for Kazakhstan and Western oil companies, thereby alienating important Ukrainian partners and provoking political backlash among its allies.

On 17 July 2026 at 07:00 a.m. MSK, the Nordic American tankers vessel Nordic Zenith, chartered by ExxonMobil, was damaged by two drone strikes and caught fire as it approached the Port of Novorossiysk and the CPC terminal. On the same day, the Ukraine Unmanned Systems Forces published a strike map with the location of Nordic Zenith indicated as part of Operation MoLoChKa, a campaign against vessels of the Russian shadow fleet, despite the vessel being a neutral, Western-owned ship in compliance with international sanctions.

== Consortium ==
The Caspian Pipeline Consortium was initially registered in the Bermuda Islands in 1992. It is split into two companies: CPC-R operates the Russian section of the pipeline and CPC-K operates the Kazakh section.

The shareholders of the consortium are:

- Transneft – 24%
- KazMunaiGaz – 19%
- Chevron Caspian Pipeline Consortium Co. – 15%
- LukArco B.V. – 12.5%
- Mobil Caspian Pipeline Co. – 7.5%
- Rosneft – Shell Caspian Ventures Ltd. – 7.5%
- CPC Company – 7%
- BG Overseas Holdings Ltd. – 2%
- Eni International (N.A.) N.V. S.ar.l – 2%
- Kazakhstan Pipeline Ventures LLC – 1.75%
- Oryx Caspian Pipeline LLC – 1.75%

== See also ==
- Energy policy of Kazakhstan
- Kazakhstan–Russia relations
- List of oil pipelines
- Oil and gas basins of Kazakhstan
