= Karachaganak Field =

Natural gas field in Kazakhstan

- Location within Kazakhstan
- Country: Kazakhstan
- Region: Pre-Caspian Basin
- Offshore/onshore: onshore
- Coordinates: 51.353452°N 53.211079°E
- Operators: Shell plc Eni
- Partners: Shell plc Eni; Lukoil; Chevron; KazMunayGas

Field history
- Discovery: 1979
- Start of production: 1984
- Abandonment: 2040+ (estimated)

Production
- Current production of oil: 200,000 barrels per day (~1.0×10^{7} t/a)
- Current production of gas: 650×10^{6} cu ft/d (18×10^{6} m^{3}/d)
- Estimated gas in place: 1,371×10^{9} m^{3} (48.4×10^{12} cu ft)
- Producing formations: Carboniferous; Permian; Devonian

The Karachaganak oil field (Kazakh: Қарашығанақ мұнай-газ конденсат кен орны, romanized: Qarashyǵanaq munaı-gaz kondensat ken orny) is a gas condensate field about 23 kilometres (14 mi) east of Aksay (Ақсай) in northwest Kazakhstan. It was once a massive Permian and Carboniferous reef complex covering an area 30 by 15 square kilometres (11.6 by 5.8 sq mi). At its largest point, the reservoir contains a gas column 1,450 metres (4,760 ft) deep with a 200 metres (660 ft) deep oil rim below it. It is estimated to contain 1.2 trillion cubic metres (42 trillion cubic feet) of gas and one billion tonnes of liquid condensate and crude oil. Discovered in 1979, it began production under Karachaganakgazprom, a subsidiary of Gazprom. In 1992, Agip (now Eni) and British Gas were awarded sole negotiating rights, forming a partnership company. In 1997, Texaco (now Chevron Corporation) and Lukoil signed a 40-year production sharing agreement with the original two companies and the Kazakhstan government to develop the field for world markets. The agreement was turned under a partnership company known as Karachaganak Petroleum Operating (KPO) where Royal Dutch Shell and ENI are joint operators with a 29.25% stake each in the company, and with Chevron and Lukoil owning 18% and 13.5% respectively. In September 2009 the KPO filed an arbitration case against Kazakhstan. The Republic of Kazakhstan appointed Maksat Idenov to lead the negotiations, after which the arbitration was suspended towards an amicable settlement of the dispute and KazMunayGas engaged in entrance into the project in 2010. Under the terms of an agreement reached on December 14, 2011, the Republic of Kazakhstan has acquired through KazMunayGas a 10% stake for $2 billion cash and $1 billion non-cash consideration.

== History ==
Located in the Uralsk Region of West Kazakhstan, it was discovered in 1979 by a well drilled to investigate a structural high detected during a reinterpretation of 2D seismic shot between 1970 and 1971. Production began in 1984 under the operatorship of Karachaganakgazprom. Limited quantities of gas and condensate were exported to Russia via pipelines and to the processing facilities at Orenburg. On 3 October 2006, Kazakhstan and Russia signed an agreement to create a joint venture on the basis of Orenburg gas processing plant for processing gas from the Karachaganak field.

=== Phase 1 ===
The phase began with three wells penetrating into the Permian formations of the reservoir. Once produced to surface the gas and oil were separated before being piped to Orenburg where further processing was undertaken. This was partially due to the sour nature of the gas, with a hydrogen sulphide content of 3.5-5.0% and carbon dioxide content of 5%. Karachaganckgazprom also maintained a policy of full gas voidage replacement to maintain pressure of the reservoir above the dew point. By 1990, approximately 200 vertical wells had been drilled in Karachaganak reaching a peak production plateau of 425 million cubic feet (12.0 million cubic metres) per day of gas and 100,000 barrels per day (16,000 m^{3}/d) of oil, before beginning to decline in 1992.

=== Phase 2 ===
Beginning in 2000 under the operation of Karachaganak Petroleum Operating (KPO), the field went under a redevelopment program. This involved an investment of over US$1 billion into the construction and enhancement of existing facilities, new gas and liquid processing and gas injection facilities, a workover program consisting of 100 existing wells, a 120 MW power station for the facilities, and connection to the Caspian Pipeline Consortium via a 650-kilometre (400 mi) line to Atyrau.

On 1 August 2003 the President of Kazakhstan Nursultan Nazarbayev took part in the ceremonial opening of the processing complex and officially launched the production facilities of the second phase.

This phase was officially completed in 2004, allowing for the production handling of 700 million cubic feet (20×10^{6} m^{3}) per day of gas and 200,000 barrels per day (32,000 m^{3}/d) of oil.

== Reservoir properties ==
Reservoir pressure	Reservoir temperature	Reservoir porosity	Net/gross ratio	Water saturation	Density of condensate	Average permeability
52–59 MPa	70 to 95 °C	5%	40%	10%	47 °API (790 kg/m^{3})	15 mD (2 μm^{2}) with high perm streaks

== Production ==
In January - June 2005, 6.4 billion cubic metres (230 billion cubic feet) of gas was recovered, and 5.7 million tons of liquid hydrocarbons was produced.

Overall, it is planned to recover about 300 million tons of liquid hydrocarbons and 800 billion cubic metres (28 trillion cubic feet) natural gas during the contract period.

One current production issue facing the field is the increasing amount of gas of which a large amount is sour. As the export facilities of the project are not fully developed, most of this gas is being recycled back into the reservoir until it can be exported profitably.

== Field reserves ==
It is estimated that the Karachaganak field contains 1.236 billion tonnes of liquids and 1.371 trillion cubic metres (48.4 trillion cubic feet) of natural gas in place (17.78 billion barrels (2.827×10^{9} m^{3}) of oil equivalent).

== Geology ==
The Karachaganak Field is one of the world's largest gas condensate fields. It is located in the Pre-Caspian (or North Caspian) Basin, which extends from the southeastern margin of the Russian Platform down to the northern coast of the Caspian Sea, and includes the offshore Caspian Sea north of about 44° N. The North Caspian is a pericratonic depression of Late Proterozoic-Early Paleozoic age. Sediments in the 500,000-square-kilometre (190,000 sq mi) basin are up to 22 kilometres (14 mi) thick in places. The basin is subdivided into numerous zones by large salt domes, and the primary salt layer, the Permian Kungurian salt, separates strata vertically into subsalt and suprasalt layers. The basin is bounded to the east by the Hercynian Ural Mountains and to the southeast and south by other orogenic belts. In the north, the basin lies on the flank of the Voronezh Massif in the west and the Volga-Ural Platform in the north. Numerous oil and gas fields have been discovered in this region in addition to Karachaganak, such as Astrakhan, Tengiz and Zhanazhol Fields.

The field consists of a heterogeneous carbonate massif with strata from three geologic periods and numerous stages of deposition during these periods. The following have been identified:

- Permian: Kungurian, Artinskian, Sakmarian, Asselian
- Carboniferous: Serpukhovian, Visean, Tournaisian
- Devonian: Famennian

The depositional setting of the field is also varied. On the basis of core sample analysis and seismic studies the following depositional settings have been identified: limestone, talus, normal marine, shallow marine, inner reef lagoon, reef core, relatively deep water, slope, and anhydrite.

The variation of deposition is due to the long period over which the Karachaganak structure was formed. From the Late Devonian to the middle Carboniferous the field was an atoll, over which in the Early Permian a system of reefs were built. At its greatest the reservoir is 1.5 km thick. This type of reservoir structure has been seen in analogous fields including Kenkiyak, Zhanazhol, Tengiz, and possibly Astrakhan fields. A west-east cross section through Karachaganak resembles the twin humps of a camel, indicating two separate reef highs.

Likewise, the large variation of deposition has led to four different types of carbonate cores in the structure: biothermal, biomorphic detrital, organo-clastic, and biochemogenic. Of these biomorphic detrital are the most common followed by biothermal rock types. However, estimates of their volumes range from 30-90% for the former and 10-60% for the latter.

== Oil and gas migration ==
As with other reservoirs in the North Caspian (Pricaspian) Basin, it is thought that the Karachaganak reservoir was filled over multiple stages, the first of which began during late Paleozoic time with the formation of oil pools. As the basin began to subside, gas was generated and migrated to the traps. The gassiness of the reservoirs is determined by their location in the basin. Northern reservoirs tend to be wet; the southwest part of the basin is more gas prone than are the east and southeast.

== Berezovka controversy ==
Since 2002, residents from the village located closest to the Karachaganak Field have been campaigning for relocation and compensation. The villagers, led by the local organization Zhasil Dala (Green Steppe), maintain that they are suffering a host of illnesses and environmental degradation due to exposure to toxic emissions from the Karachaganak Field, situated five kilometers away.

Independent Bucket Brigade air monitoring conducted by the villagers from September 2004 to August 2005 registered more than 25 toxic substances in the air, including hydrogen sulfide, methylene chloride, carbon disulfide, toluene, and acrylonitrile. In 2005, Karachaganak's regional environmental authority temporarily revoked the operating license of KPO B.V. due to environmental violations, including emitting 56 thousand tons of toxic waste in the atmosphere in 2004, improper storage of toxic solid waste on the field, and dumping toxic effluent into the water table. The consortium was found to have dumped an excess of waste in 2008, resulting in a $21 million fine in early 2010.

The villagers contend that they should have been relocated upon the start of field operations as Kazakhstani law stipulates a five-kilometer Sanitary Protection Zone (SPZ) around the field. However, in 2003, the government reduced the SPZ to three kilometers, effectively barring the villagers from relocation. After three years of protest from the villagers, Kazakhstan's Public Prosecutor found the 2003 decision to reduce the SPZ to be illegal, and the five-kilometer SPZ was reinstated in 2006. However, the village has not been relocated.

In 2002, the private sector arm of the World Bank Group, the International Finance Corporation (IFC), provided $150 million in loans to Lukoil for development of the Karachaganak Field. These loans were repaid by Lukoil in January 2009. From 2004 to 2008, three complaints were filed with the IFC's Compliance Advisor/Ombudsman's office regarding the IFC's violations of its own environmental standards in financing the Karachaganak Field. One of the complaints results in a report by the Auditor, published in April 2008, which documented numerous instances of non-compliance with IFC standards at Karachaganak. One of the revelations was that no results for hydrogen sulfide monitoring had been reported between 2003 and 2006—years during which the Berezovka residents maintain they were suffering health problems due to hydrogen sulfide exposure.

Zhasil Dala works in partnership on this campaign with the US-based environmental justice organization Crude Accountability and the Kazakhstani Ecological Society Green Salvation, among others.

== See also ==
- Natural gas processing
- Natural gas condensate
- Oil and gas basins of Kazakhstan
