= Samruk-Energy =

Kazakhstani company engaged in the electric power sector

- Native name: Самұрық-Энерго
- Type: State-owned enterprise
- Industry: Electric power
- Founded: 2007
- Founder: Samruk-Kazyna
- Headquarters: Astana, Kazakhstan
- Key people: Maksutov Kairat (Chairman of the Management Board)
- Products: Electricity generation, transmission, and distribution
- Owner: Samruk-Kazyna (99.51%)
- Parent: Samruk-Kazyna
- Subsidiaries: Bogatyr Coal; AES Ekibastuz LLP; JSC Balkhash Thermal Power Plant; Moynak HPP
- Website: samruk-energy.kz

Samruk-Energy (Kazakh: Самұрық-Энерго, romanized: Samūryq-Énergo) is a state-owned Kazakhstani company engaged in the electric power sector. The company is vertically integrated, with businesses spanning coal mining, power generation, transmission, and distribution.

== History ==
The company was founded in 2007. It is a wholly owned subsidiary of Samruk-Kazyna, Kazakhstan's sovereign wealth fund. The company was set up to modernize Kazakhstan's energy sector. It focuses on reducing Foreign exchange risk, improving operational efficiency, and identifying renewable energy opportunities.

In 2013, the company secured a ₸14.2 billion (US$94 million) loan from the Eurasian Development Bank to finance the construction of Kazakhstan's first large-scale wind farm. In 2016, it received a loan equivalent to €100 million in local currency from the European Bank for Reconstruction and Development(EBRD).

In March 2019, Samruk-Energy became the first business partner of the European Bank for Reconstruction and Development to sign the United Nations' Women's Empowerment Principles (WEPs) as part of the EBRD's Equal Opportunities Initiative. Samruk-Energy subsidiary, Bogatyr Komir LLP, is the largest coal mining company in Kazakhstan.

In 2022, Samruk-Kazyna announced its plan to reduce its ownership in its companies, such as KazMunayGas and Air Astana, through a series of privatizations and initial public offerings to be completed by 2025.

=== Sustainability ===
In 2022, it conducted prefeasibility studies for renewable energy projects with a total capacity of 558.2 MW, nearing its 850.0 MW target at 65.7% progress. In 2023, it obtained financing to upgrade a power plant in Almaty, transitioning from a coal-fired facility to a lower-emission gas turbine plant to enhance sustainability and potentially decrease greenhouse gas emissions.

== Operations ==
The company has a diverse portfolio of power plants, including hydropower and thermal power plants, as well as coal mining operations. Samruk-Energy also operates coal mining assets to secure fuel supplies for its thermal power generation. In 2021, the company generated 35,609 gigawatt-hours (GWh) of electricity, a major increase from 27,760 GWh in 2017.

== Finance ==
The company's Earnings before interest, taxes, depreciation and amortization (EBITDA) grew from T86.3 billion in 2020 to T114.7 billion in 2021. The debt-to-EBITDA ratio has also improved, decreasing from 3.2 times in 2018 to 2.6 times in 2021, indicating a stronger capacity to service debt obligations. It has successfully managed its debt portfolio, reducing the overall interest rate from 12.6% in 2018 to 10.7% in 2021.

The company's total revenues grew from T219.9 billion in 2017 to T332.5 billion in 2021, driven by increased generation and tariff. The company received a $120 million corporate finance loan from the Asian Development Bank (ADB) in 2017 for the Restructuring and Transformation Project.

== Rating ==
Fitch Ratings affirmed Samruk-Energy's BB+ rating with a stable outlook in November 2022, citing improved financials and debt reduction.

== Controversies ==
In 2022, Kazakhstan's Anti-Corruption Service launched an investigation against the top management of Samruk-Kazyna and Samruk-Energy for alleged abuse of office, which reportedly caused 3.8 billion tenge in damages to the state.

== See also ==
- Samruk-Kazyna
- Energy in Kazakhstan
