= Kurmangazy =

Kurmangazy may refer to:

- Kurmangazy District - a district in Atyrau Province, Kazakhstan
- Kurmangazy oil field - an oilfield in Kazakhstan
- Kurmangazy Sagyrbayuly - a Kazakh composer
