= NCOC =

NCOC may refer to:

- National Conference on Citizenship
- New College of California
- North Caspian Operating Company
- National Command and Operation Center, former body governing the national COVID-19 effort of Pakistan
