= Presidency of Kassym-Jomart Tokayev =

Presidency of Kassym-Jomart Tokayev, 2019-

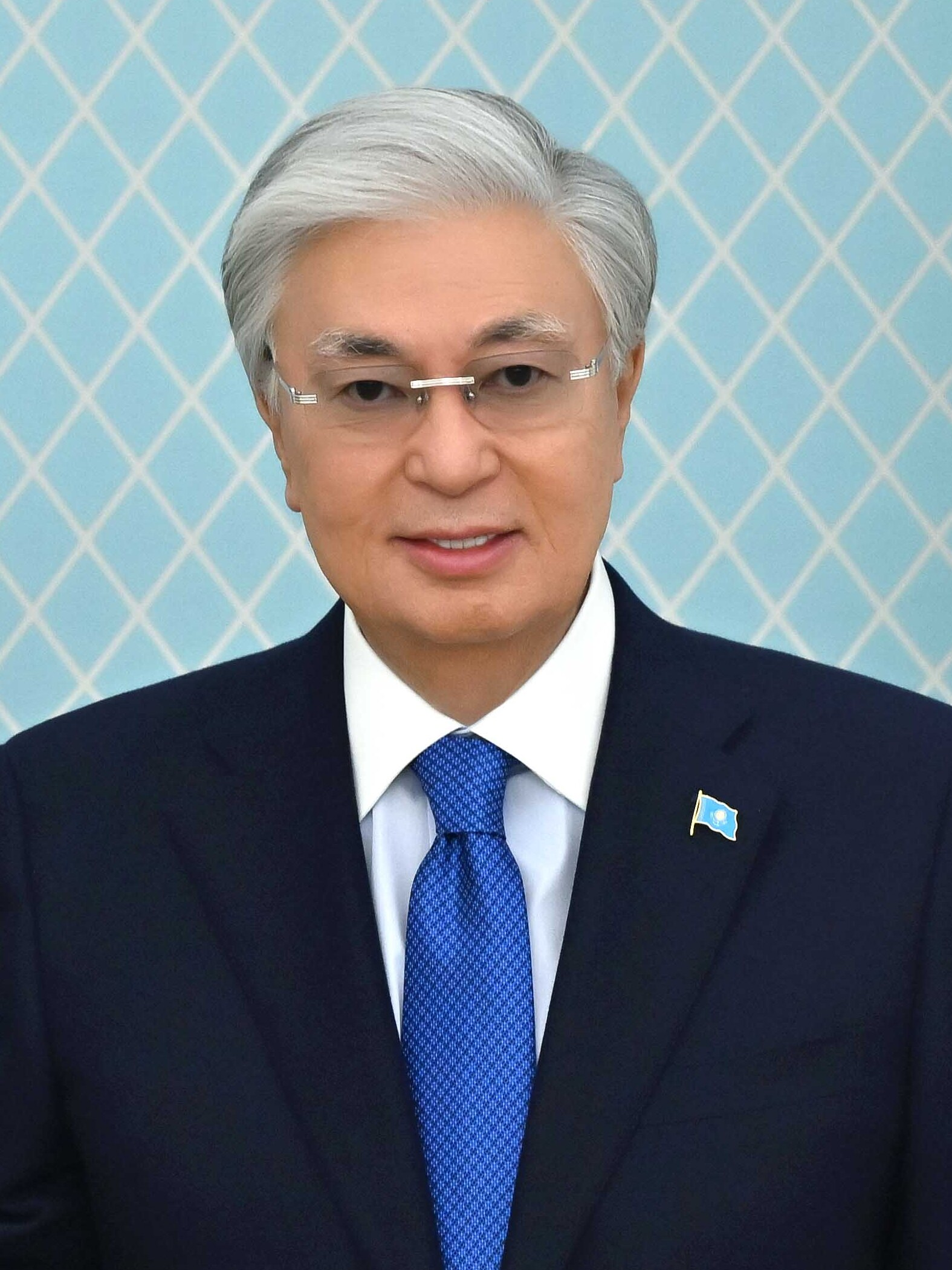
- Presidency of Kassym-Jomart Tokayev; 20 March 2019 – present
- President: Kassym-Jomart Tokayev
- Party: Independent
- Election: 2019; 2022
- Seat: Aqorda
- Standard of the President

The Presidency of Kassym-Jomart Tokayev began on 20 March 2019, when he assumed office shortly after the resignation of long-time President Nursultan Nazarbayev; as a Senate Chairman, Tokayev became the Presidential Designate in accordance with the Constitution and would serve as an acting head of state. After declaring snap presidential elections Tokayev, endorsed by Nazarbayev, become the candidate for the ruling Nur Otan party and swept 71% of the vote in the race, thus becoming officially the 2nd president of Kazakhstan. After being inaugurated on 12 June 2019, Tokayev pledged to uphold many of Nazarbayev's previous policies, and to continue and accelerate social and political reforms.

== Presidency ==
On 9 April 2019, Tokayev announced early elections to be held on 9 June 2019. On 23 April, Tokayev became a candidate for president following his nomination by the Nur Otan party. During the campaign, Tokayev was mocked on social media for his use of photo manipulation software to erase his wrinkles and double chin from official photos. Tokayev was elected president of Kazakhstan on 9 June with 71% of the popular vote. He was congratulated by foreign heads of state such as Xi Jinping, Ilham Aliyev, Recep Tayyip Erdogan, Emomali Rahmon, and Sooronbay Jeenbekov.

=== Political reforms ===
In May 2020, Tokayev signed the laws “On the procedure for organizing and holding peaceful assemblies in the Republic of Kazakhstan”, “On introducing amendments to the Constitutional Law of the Republic of Kazakhstan“, “On Elections in the Republic of Kazakhstan”, and “On introducing amendments and additions to the Law of the Republic of Kazakhstan “On Political Parties”. The new laws are an important part of the measures to strengthen the state's democratic foundations, and enhance the role of civil society. In his State of the Nation Address, he emphasised that "Kazakhstan must create a multi-party system to build a modern, effective state", also saying that the ruling Nur Otan party should collaborate more with other parties.

Tokayev advocated political reforms that would promote the concept of a "state that listens" to civil society creating a constructive dialogue. Tokayev initiated the establishment of the new National Council of Public Trust to facilitate this dialogue. He also called for direct elections for the äkıms (local heads) of rural districts, townships, and villages to be held in 2021 to which he signed decree on 14 September 2020 of the implementation of National Plan of Measures which set tasks for the drafting of constitutional amendments that would allow for rural äkım direct elections as well as the development of local government and its functions. After the 2021 legislative elections which saw three of five contesting parties retain their seats in the Mazhilis, Tokayev at the opening 1st Session of the 7th Parliament proposed to reduce the electoral threshold from 7% to 5%, stating it would encourage more registered parties to participate in the future parliamentary elections as well as the vote option "Against all" to be re-included in the ballots once again. As the Parliament ratified Tokayev's proposed constitutional amendments, he signed the laws into place on 25 May 2021.

==== Abolition of capital punishment ====
Tokayev played a pivotal role in Kazakhstan's decision to abolish the death penalty, a move shaped by domestic human rights advocacy and international commitments. In December 2019, he announced the country's intention to join the Second Optional Protocol to the International Covenant on Civil and Political Rights, responding to concerns raised by Kazakh human rights activists and experts during discussions at the National Council of Public Trust. He directed the Ministry of Foreign Affairs to initiate the process of accession, setting the stage for legislative changes.

Addressing the United Nations General Assembly in 2020, Tokayev framed the decision as a step toward fulfilling "a fundamental right to life and human dignity." Shortly after, on 23 September 2020, Kazakhstan's representative to the UN, Kairat Umarov, formally signed the protocol. The Parliament ratified the document on 29 December 2020, and on 2 January 2021, Tokayev signed the decree officially abolishing the death penalty.

The move garnered international recognition, with Amnesty International's Director for Eastern Europe and Central Asia, Marie Struthers, applauding Kazakhstan for joining "the ever-growing community of nations that have left this shameful punishment behind." Navi Pillay, President of the International Commission Against the Death Penalty (ICDP), described it as a "historic international commitment to end the death penalty during peacetime."

=== Climate change ===
Tokayev expressed support for the tackling of climate change, calling it "urgent and existential." At the Climate Ambitions Summit in which was held remotely on 12 December 2020, Tokayev pledged for Kazakhstan to reach carbon neutrality by 2060 with a development and adoption of a long term development strategy to lower emissions and de-carbonisation of the economy. He said that Kazakhstan is "highly vulnerable to climate change as a landlocked and developing state" with a heavy reliant on fossil fuels and proposed for the planting for two billion trees within the country in order increase carbon absorption and curb looming desertification problems.

=== Corruption ===
Tokayev has consistently emphasized the need for strict accountability in the implementation of state programs and the responsible use of public funds. He has been vocal about the detrimental impact corruption has on the Kazakhstan's development, calling it a "direct damage to national security". As a result, he has made it clear that any acts of mismanagement or theft of public funds would be met with severe consequences. Tokayev underscored this position during government meetings, where he called for the resignation of any government minister or local administrator (äkim) whose subordinates are found guilty of corruption-related crimes. He firmly stated that resignation should be a mandatory measure, making it clear that any objection to this decision is a prerogative solely belonging to the head of state.

On 28 November 2019, Tokayev took a major step in institutionalizing his anti-corruption agenda by signing into law the "On Amendments and Additions to Certain Legislative Acts of the Republic of Kazakhstan on Civil Service and Anti-Corruption Issues". This landmark legislation required government ministers and regional leaders, or äkims, to step down if corruption is uncovered within their institutions. The law sought to hold top officials accountable for the actions of their subordinates and aimed to ensure that no one in power could escape responsibility for corruption within their respective departments.

Further reinforcing his anti-corruption position, Tokayev ordered the Anti-Corruption Agency to intensify investigations into the financial mismanagement and corruption that plagued the Astana Light Metro (LRT) project. In October 2019, Tokayev instructed the agency to probe the disappearance of substantial funds allocated for the construction of the metro system, suggesting that certain city officials may have been involved in allowing individuals implicated in the scandal to flee abroad. One of the key figures in the case was Talgat Ardan, the former chief executive of the LRT project, who was issued an arrest warrant in July 2019 on charges of embezzling public funds. Tokayev asserted that the LRT project, despite the scandal, should continue, but that those responsible for the embezzlement and the cover-up must be held fully accountable.

=== Economy ===
Tokayev spoke in favour of a distribution of national income, calling it "strategically important" for the country. On 17 June 2019, he signed a decree, forming the Ministry of Trade and Integration, appointing Bakhyt Sultanov to the post which would aim to increase exports essential to economic growth and job creation. At the address to the nation, Tokayev called for an increase in the national minimum wage for the first time since 2018 from 42,500 to 60,000 ₸ starting 1 January 2022, citing the global pandemic which caused financial strain and asserted that it would lead to growth in domestic consumption. In terms of wage fund, Tokayev instructed the government to implement soft measures in encouraging businesses to raise salaries for employees by pledging for state-supported benefits.

In an interview to Bloomberg News, Tokayev announced a debt relief "for people who find themselves in very difficult circumstances", telling that his initiative would target 16% of the Kazakhstan's population. At the same time, he called for an end of government bailouts for banks, believing that the state should not be involved with the issue. That same day on 26 June 2019, he signed decree "On measures to reduce the debt burden of citizens of the Republic of Kazakhstan" which instructed the government and the National Bank to start the process of decommissioning unsecured consumer loans.

At the January 2020 government meeting, Tokayev set the task of forming the Centre for Analysis and Monitoring of Socio-Economic Reforms under the Presidential Administration, which would operate on a voluntary basis and later be transformed into a Presidential Reform Agency. At the same time, he called for more enforced registration of cars imported from Eurasian Economic Union (EAEU), noting that auto owners themselves would be required to pay the registration fee and tax despite backlash from several car owners with Kyrgyzstani and Armenian number plates whom protested Tokayev's proposal in several cities.

On 9 March 2020, following the worsening economic situation worldwide as a result of COVID-19 pandemic, Tokayev instructed the government to form an anti-crisis plan which would fulfill "all social obligations". On 17 March, a series of packages were unveiled which aimed at easing burden for private sector by providing cheaper credit, tax incentives, cutting back on audits and promoting employment. As the pandemic progressed, inflation for goods began to grow leading to an increase in social discontent particularly in western Kazakhstan. In response to the problem, Tokayev blamed the government and the central bank for being too "powerless" and from there, urged them to reduce the inflation rate towards 2–4%, noting the surplus amount of the money supply in result of implemented anti-crisis measures.

=== Energy ===
Energy has been a key priority throughout Tokayev's presidency, as it is crucial for Kazakhstan's economic growth and national security. With the growing demand for electricity and outdated infrastructure struggling to keep up, Tokayev implemented a broad energy strategy that emphasized diversification, modernization, attracting foreign investments, and regulatory reforms.

In May 2021, Tokayev introduced the Low-Carbon Development Concept, a national plan designed to reduce the country's dependence on coal and boost the use of renewable energy sources like solar and wind power. This strategy also focused on attracting foreign investment to help modernize Kazakhstan's green energy infrastructure and drive technological innovations. By late 2021, the situation became even more challenging as electricity consumption surged by 8%, partly driven by an influx of cryptocurrency miners who had relocated from China. Cities such as Almaty and Karaganda became new hubs for mining, placing an enormous strain on Kazakhstan's already fragile power grid, resulting in frequent electricity shortages. In response to this crisis, Tokayev's government was forced to accelerate efforts to diversify energy sources and implement stronger regulation of energy-intensive industries, especially cryptocurrency mining. To tackle this, in 2022, Tokayev's government launched a national energy efficiency program, which aimed to reduce energy waste across both residential and industrial sectors, modernize outdated power plants, and improve energy storage systems to strengthen the grid. This was complemented by broader energy market reforms aimed at securing long-term energy stability and attracting more investment.

To solidify Kazakhstan's position in the global energy market, Tokayev's administration introduced a series of regulatory incentives aimed at encouraging private investment in the energy sector. Additionally, the government worked to forge stronger partnerships with both European and Asian energy firms, while also increasing state control over key energy projects to secure better terms for Kazakhstan. By 2025, the country renegotiated production-sharing agreements with major Western oil and gas companies such as Chevron, ExxonMobil, Shell, and TotalEnergies. These negotiations were aimed at ensuring a larger share of revenue for Kazakhstan, ensuring that the terms aligned more closely with the country's economic needs and energy security interests.

==== Nuclear power ====
From the start of his presidency, Tokayev recognized the urgent need to address Kazakhstan's energy security challenges. In April 2019, he warned that the country could face an electricity deficit by 2030 due to aging infrastructure and its heavy reliance on coal. To ensure long-term energy stability, Tokayev proposed exploring nuclear energy as a viable solution. His government-initiated discussions with international partners, including Russia's Rosatom, France's EDF, the U.S.-Japanese consortium GVH, South Korea's KHNP, China's CNNC, and the U.S.-based NuScale Power. Potential sites for the country's first nuclear power plant were also evaluated, with Ülken and Kurchatov emerging as key locations due to their infrastructure and energy distribution potential.

Recognizing the limitations of renewable energy alone, Tokayev revisited the nuclear energy option. In September 2023, he announced a national referendum to determine whether Kazakhstan should proceed with building its first nuclear power plant in the village of Ülken, near Lake Balkhash. The proposal was controversial due to Kazakhstan's history with nuclear weapons testing, but the government emphasized strict adherence to international safety standards. Tokayev's decision to put the issue to a public vote reflected his commitment to transparency and inclusive decision-making. The referendum, held in October 2024, resulted in public approval for the nuclear plant, marking a historic shift in Kazakhstan's energy policy. Plans for construction near Lake Balkhash were subsequently launched, positioning nuclear power as a key component of Kazakhstan's long-term energy security strategy.

=== Education ===
Tokayev has placed a significant focus on improving the education sector in Kazakhstan, recognizing its crucial role in the nation's development. Since taking office, Tokayev has worked to enhance the quality of education, support educators, and address issues of inequality within the system. His leadership has been marked by key reforms aimed at raising the status of teachers and expanding access to quality education for students across the country, particularly in underprivileged areas.

In August 2019, during a teacher's conference, Tokayev announced an ambitious plan to increase the average salary of school teachers in Kazakhstan. Over the course of four years, the government committed to doubling teachers' salaries. This move was part of a broader effort to improve the working conditions and prestige of the teaching profession in the country. Tokayev emphasized the need to recognize the critical role teachers play in shaping the future of Kazakhstan, noting that their work should be valued accordingly. In addition to increasing salaries, Tokayev also instructed the Ministry of Education and Science to develop and implement special programs aimed at addressing the academic gap faced by students from low-income families and schools in socially troubled areas. He identified the educational inequality between urban and rural areas as a particular challenge and called for targeted efforts to ensure that all children, regardless of their background, had access to high-quality education.

On 30 December 2019, Tokayev signed the "On the Status of the Teacher" law into effect. This legislation aimed to support the teaching profession and enhance its prestige within society. The law provided a framework for improving teachers' rights and working conditions, including the introduction of better legal protections, and incentives to attract more individuals into the profession. By elevating the status of teachers, the government hoped to encourage higher standards within the education system, creating a more attractive career path for prospective educators.

Tokayev's commitment to improving Kazakh education system extended beyond primary and secondary schools. In his third meeting of the National Council of Public Trust, Tokayev announced that university professors’ salaries would also see an increase, aligning with his broader goal of improving the status of educators at all levels. Furthermore, Tokayev called for improvements to Kazakhstan's higher education system to enhance its competitiveness both domestically and internationally. As part of these efforts, the government also increased the average cost of educational grants, making higher education more accessible to talented students across the country.

=== Environment ===
Environmental issues have been an area of focus for President Kassym-Jomart Tokayev since he assumed office. In his inaugural speech, Tokayev expressed concern over Kazakhstan's environmental challenges and proposed a unified policy aimed at addressing these issues. Under his leadership, a series of initiatives were introduced to enhance environmental protection, address air pollution, and ensure the sustainable use of the country's natural resources.

On 17 June 2019, Tokayev signed a decree to establish the Ministry of Ecology, Geology, and Natural Resources. This ministry was tasked with overseeing the protection of the environment, the rational use of natural resources, and the regulation of various environmental issues, including waste management, water resources, and forestry. Magzum Myrzagaliev was appointed as the head of the ministry, with the responsibility to manage and protect Kazakhstan's natural environment. The creation of the Ministry signified a comprehensive approach to tackling environmental challenges. The ministry was granted the authority to regulate key aspects of environmental protection, including sustainable management of natural resources, oversight of geological research and the extraction of mineral resources, and management of waste, water, and forestry, all with an emphasis on sustainability and long-term ecological balance.

A major environmental concern in Kazakhstan has been the high levels of air pollution in Almaty, the country's largest city. In response to growing public concern about deteriorating air quality, Tokayev called for immediate action. One of the significant contributors to air pollution was the Almaty-2 thermal power station, which was responsible for approximately 30% of the city's emissions. In his address, Tokayev ordered the Kazakh government, Almaty city administration, and Samruk-Energy, the state-owned energy conglomerate, to expedite the transition of the Almaty-2 thermal power plant to natural gas. This measure was seen as essential for reducing harmful emissions and improving air quality. Tokayev made it clear that any delays in this process would be "absolutely unacceptable", highlighting the urgency of the issue.

==== Environmental Code (2021) ====
In 2021, Tokayev's administration took a significant step towards modernizing Kazakhstan's environmental policies with the adoption of a new Environmental Code on 2 January 2021. The new legislation, which came into effect on 1 July 2021, replaced the previous 2007 version, reflecting the growing need for more comprehensive and updated regulations to address the country's environmental challenges.

The updated Environmental Code introduced progressive changes aimed at improving environmental protection and promoting sustainable development. One key change is the introduction of the Best Available Techniques (BAT) standard, which encourages the use of the most effective technologies to reduce environmental damage from industrial activities. The code also focuses on improving air quality, water conservation, and waste management, with stricter rules for monitoring and assessing environmental impacts before approving industrial projects. A major part of the code is the "polluter pays" principle, meaning that industries responsible for pollution must pay for environmental protection measures. These payments will be fully used to fund environmental projects. Local authorities will also play a bigger role in improving environmental quality. Additionally, the public will have a say in decisions about major projects that could harm the environment, ensuring more transparency. The code also supports the use of advanced technologies to reduce pollution and promote energy efficiency, while encouraging the growth of domestic industries. Finally, the code ensures that environmental information is open to the public, helping citizens and organizations hold polluting companies accountable.

==== Caspian Sea Protection Protocol ====
In addition to tackling domestic environmental challenges, Tokayev has emphasized Kazakhstan's role in international environmental protection efforts. On 30 September 2021, the Mäjilis voted in favor of ratifying the Protocol on the Protection of the Caspian Sea from Land-based Sources and Activities. This protocol is part of the Framework Convention for the Protection of the Marine Environment of the Caspian Sea, aimed at reducing pollution and preserving the marine ecosystem of the Caspian Sea, which borders Kazakhstan.

Tokayev's government viewed the ratification of the protocol as an important step toward regional and international environmental cooperation. The protocol calls for the development and implementation of national and regional programs to control pollution entering the Caspian Sea from land-based sources, the creation and maintenance of a database to monitor the environmental quality of the Caspian Sea and its coastal areas, and the establishment of action plans to protect the sea's ecosystem from the impacts of pollution.

Following the parliamentary vote, Tokayev signed the law into effect on 4 October 2021, solidifying Kazakhstan's commitment to protecting the Caspian Sea and cooperating with other nations in the region to ensure the health of the marine environment.

=== Healthcare ===
In his 2019 State Address to the Nation, President Kassym-Jomart Tokayev announced a significant initiative aimed at improving the healthcare system of Kazakhstan. Starting from 1 January 2020, a health insurance mandate was implemented to enhance the quality and accessibility of medical services for all citizens. This new policy was introduced to ensure that every individual in Kazakhstan could receive necessary healthcare without a heavy financial burden.

Tokayev made it clear that despite the introduction of mandatory health insurance, the government would continue to maintain a guaranteed amount of free medical care. For the next three years, the government allocated 2.8 trillion tenge to fund free medical services. In addition, an extra 2.3 trillion tenge was earmarked for the development of the healthcare system itself, with the objective to improve infrastructure, increase the number of medical professionals, and enhance the quality of services provided to the public.

At the same time, Tokayev addressed issues related to the legal environment in the healthcare sector. During a meeting of the National Council of Public Trust, he urged ministers to reconsider the criminalization of medical errors, calling it unfair to prosecute healthcare workers in this manner. Tokayev expressed his concern that such practices discouraged professionals and hindered the development of the medical field. His administration focused on strengthening legal protection for healthcare workers, while at the same time ensuring accountability through other means.

On 7 July 2020, Tokayev signed two pieces of legislation: the Code on Public Health and Healthcare System and the Law on Amendments and Additions to Certain Legislative Acts on Healthcare Issues. These laws were vital in providing stronger protection for medical professionals, introducing a differentiated approach to medical errors, and clarifying citizens' rights concerning vaccination. Additionally, the new regulations introduced more stringent controls on tobacco use, such as banning the import, production, and distribution of snus (a type of smokeless tobacco), and imposing stricter penalties on the sale of tobacco products to individuals under the age of 21.

=== Infrastructure ===
From the outset of his presidency, Tokayev placed a strong emphasis on large-scale infrastructure investments as a key driver for Kazakhstan's economic development and the improvement of living standards for its citizens. In 2019, Tokayev made the strategic decision to prioritize the continuation of the Nurly Zhol infrastructure program, which had been initiated by his predecessor, Nursultan Nazarbayev. Over the course of his presidency, Tokayev's government allocated substantial financial resources, including 1.2 trillion tenge, towards modernizing Kazakhstan's infrastructure. This investment focused on expanding access to essential services such as clean drinking water, natural gas, and public transportation, with particular attention given to rural and underserved areas.

A cornerstone of Tokayev's infrastructure agenda has been the transformation of Kazakhstan's transport networks, which are vital for strengthening both internal connectivity and trade with neighboring countries. Noteworthy achievements in this area include the construction of 1,300 kilometers of new railways, the establishment of Kazakhstan's first cross-border railway with China, and the development of new land ports. These projects are central to enhancing Kazakhstan's trade relations with Russia and China, two of its most important trading partners, and position the country as a key player in regional logistics under the framework of the Belt and Road Initiative. Furthermore, in 2024, the government successfully completed the construction of 7,000 kilometers of highways, a major upgrade to Kazakhstan's road infrastructure that bolstered the country's logistical capabilities and facilitated smoother trade across the region.

The expansion of Kazakhstan's aviation infrastructure has been another area of focus for Tokayev's administration. As part of his 2020 announcement of turning Almaty into Central Asia's largest aviation hub, a new terminal was inaugurated at Almaty International Airport in May 2024. This development aligns with Tokayev's broader goal of enhancing Kazakhstan's position in global trade and improving its connectivity with international markets. In addition to the Almaty project, new airport terminals were constructed in Kyzylorda and Shymkent, which contribute to strengthening Kazakhstan's domestic and international transportation networks.

As part of his commitment to improving the quality of life for citizens, Tokayev's administration focused on meeting the growing demand for housing. In 2021, Kazakhstan was ranked as the leader in housing construction volume among the CIS countries, with the country constructing 0.81 square meters of housing per capita in 2020. Building on this momentum, Kazakhstan achieved a significant milestone in 2024, completing a record 18 million square meters of new housing that year alone.

In parallel with these transportation, housing, and aviation advancements, Tokayev has made notable strides in improving Kazakhstan's digital infrastructure. The initiative launched in 2020 as part of the Digital Kazakhstan project. It has been a key pillar of the government's modernization efforts, aiming to expand broadband internet access across the country, with a particular focus on rural areas by 2025. This initiative is a vital part of Kazakhstan's transition to a knowledge-based economy, improving access to essential services like education, healthcare, and e-commerce, and enhancing the country's competitiveness in the global economy.

=== Relationship with Nazarbayev ===
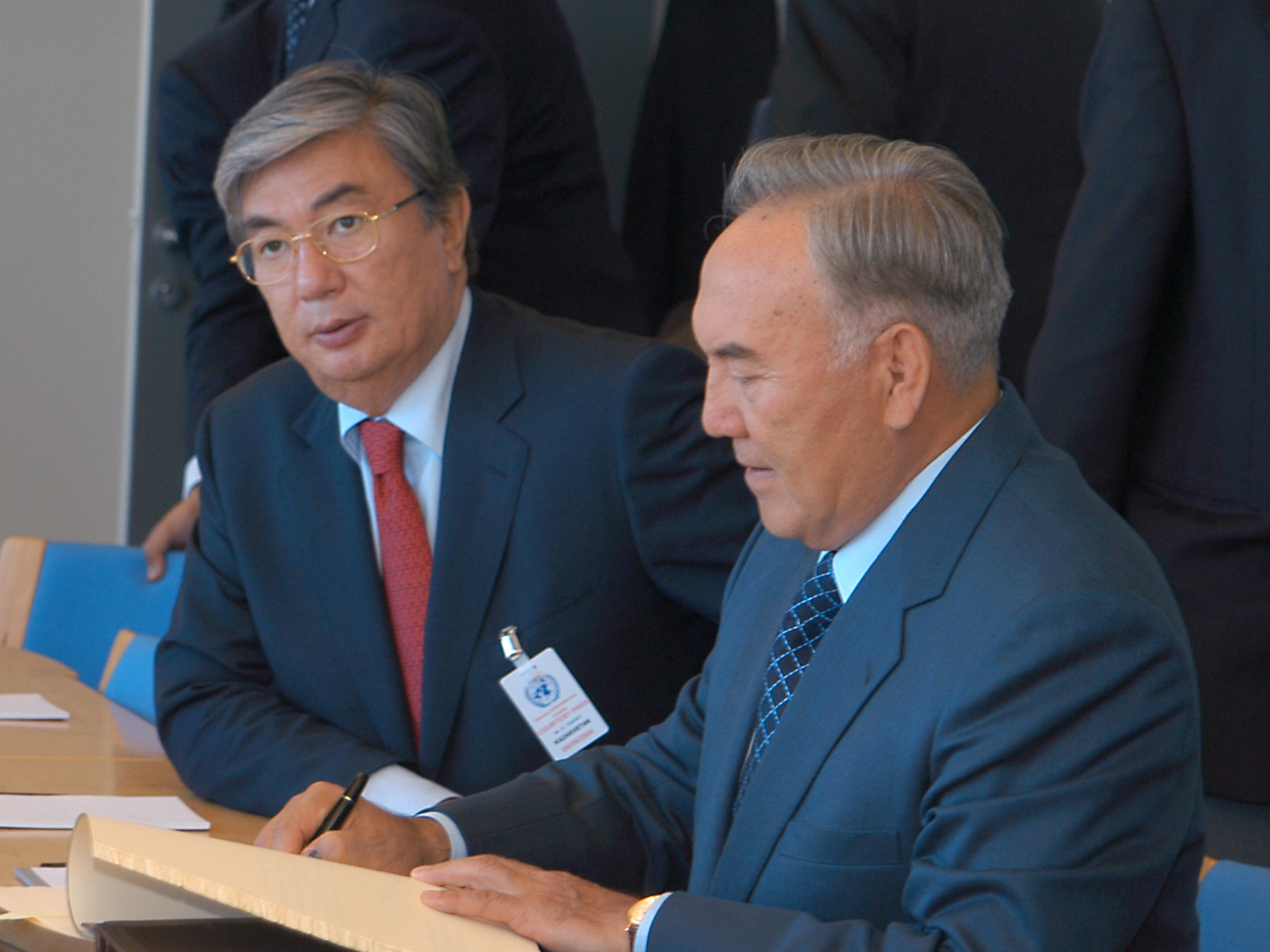
Minister of Foreign Affairs Kassym-Jomart Tokayev (left) and President Nursultan Nazarbayev, 2004

Upon assuming the presidency of Kazakhstan in 2019, Tokayev immediately faced a complex political environment, largely shaped by his predecessor, Nursultan Nazarbayev, who had ruled the country for nearly three decades. Tokayev's relationship with Nazarbayev was crucial during his early presidency, balancing both continuity and the need for political change.

One of Tokayev's first acts as president was the renaming of Kazakhstan's capital from Astana to Nur-Sultan, in honour of Nazarbayev. This move came right after Tokayev's inauguration, showing a respect for Nazarbayev's role in shaping the country. The Parliament passed the decision on the same day, marking the first major act of the new administration, but also setting the stage for the gradual political transformation to come.

Despite stepping down from the presidency, Nursultan Nazarbayev retained substantial influence over Kazakhstan's political system. In October 2019, it was revealed that all ministerial appointments, except for those of the Defence, Interior, and Foreign Ministers, still required Nazarbayev's approval. This arrangement highlighted his continued dominance, even as Tokayev officially took charge. The power structure seemed to be a shared governance, with Tokayev at the head while Nazarbayev still played a key role in major decisions.

In May 2020, Tokayev made a decisive move by removing Dariga Nazarbayeva, daughter of the former president, from her position as Chairwoman of the Senate. This was viewed as a step towards asserting Tokayev's authority and reducing the Nazarbayev family's grip on Kazakhstan's institutions. The removal sparked speculation about a growing political struggle between Tokayev and the Nazarbayev faction, signaling perhaps that Tokayev was attempting to distance himself from Nazarbayev's legacy.

In April 2021, Nazarbayev resigned from his position as chairman of the Assembly of People of Kazakhstan (QHA), an influential post tied to Kazakhstan's ethnic policy. Nazarbayev suggested Tokayev take over the position, which Tokayev accepted, acknowledging Nazarbayev's historical contribution and suggesting that he should retain the honorary title of "Honorary Chairman" of the QHA.

==== 2022 unrest and aftermath ====
In January 2022, mass protests erupted across Kazakhstan, initially sparked by a fuel price hike but quickly escalating into broader demands for political change, including calls for the resignation of both Tokayev and Nazarbayev. In response, Tokayev declared a state of emergency, dismissing several key Nazarbayev appointed government officials, including Prime Minister Asqar Mamin and Karim Massimov, head of the National Security Committee (KNB), who had long been a close ally of Nazarbayev.

As part of the crisis response, Tokayev assumed control of the Security Council, a position that had been held by Nazarbayev. This move was a step in Tokayev's attempt to dismantle the power structures linked to Nazarbayev's influence.

In January 2022, Tokayev announced the renaming of the ruling party, Nur Otan, which had long been associated with Nazarbayev's political legacy, to Amanat. This move marked a clear break from the past and signaling Tokayev's desire to reshape Kazakhstan's political institutions. It was part of a broader effort to distance his administration from Nazarbayev's influence, symbolizing a fresh direction for the country.

In March 2022, Tokayev delivered a key speech that was hailed as the beginning of a new phase in Kazakhstan's political development. Tokayev announced a range of political reforms, including constitutional amendments that would mark a departure from the super-presidential system. This would result in a more balanced political structure, with less concentrated power and more parliamentary influence.

On 5 May 2022, Tokayev revealed that a nationwide referendum would be held to approve these constitutional changes. Among the proposed amendments were the establishment of a Constitutional Court, the abolition of the death penalty, and, importantly, the removal of all references to Nazarbayev from the constitution. Tokayev presented these reforms as laying the groundwork for a “Second Republic,” a clear break from the authoritarian style of governance associated with Nazarbayev's long rule.

=== Foreign policy ===
Upon taking office, Tokayev promised to continue the foreign policy that was started by his predecessor, Nursultan Nazarbayev. This meant he would keep focusing on attracting foreign investments, maintaining Kazakhstan's multi-vector foreign policy, and ensuring regional security. In the first month of his presidency, Tokayev met with four world leaders—two during trips abroad and two in Nur-Sultan.

On 7 April 2021, Tokayev signed a decree to create the position of Special Representative for International Cooperation, explaining that this role would help the leadership pay closer attention to international cooperation, especially considering the rapidly changing global and regional situation. Erzhan Kazykhanov was appointed to the position, with instructions to focus on expanding Kazakhstan's international ties in areas like humanitarian work, climate diplomacy, and promoting key foreign policy initiatives.

==== Russia ====
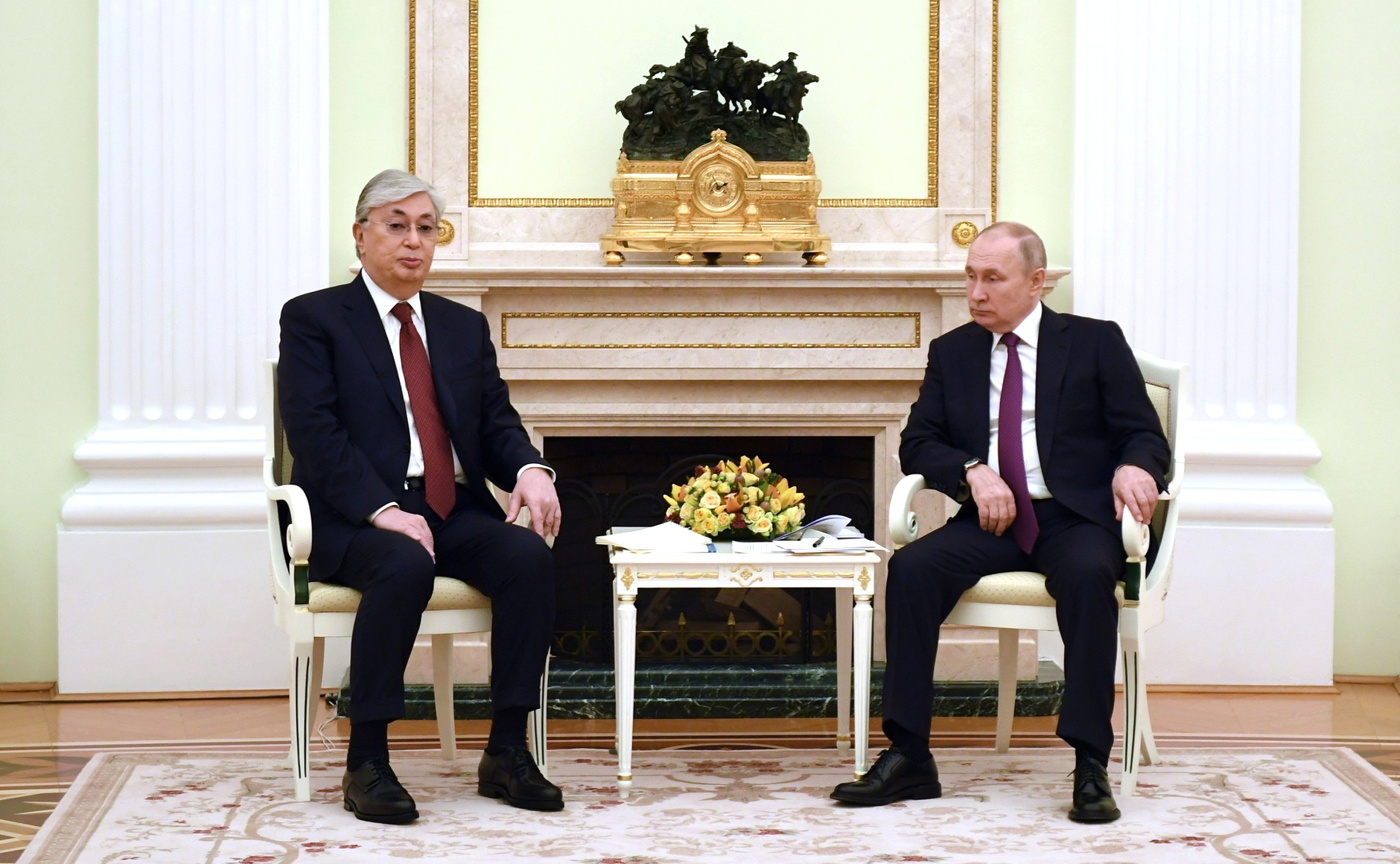
Tokayev with Russian President Vladimir Putin in Moscow, 28 November 2022

According to political analyst Rico Isaacs, the decision in Tokayev replacing Nursultan Nazarbayev was due to his own full will to not rapidly implement democratization reforms, which would hurt Nazarbayev's legacy of stability and relations with Russia. Just two weeks after taking office, Tokayev visited Moscow in his first foreign state visit on 4 April 2019, meeting with Putin alongside other Russian officials. During the visit, Putin offered Russian assistance to Tokayev in the construction of a proposed nuclear power plant in the country. In June 2019, Tokayev ruled out that the decision of constructing a nuclear power plants would be made on decision by local matter, if by means of a referendum. At a meeting with cabinet officials, Tokayev stated that Kazakhstan would not rush with the proposal, although noting that nation shouldn't delay longer with decision. He argued that the entire developed world relies on nuclear power telling that "phobias are out of place here."

During a visit to Sochi in October 2019, Tokayev in a speech at Valdai Discussion Club praised Russia as a "great state" and that "in the modern world no key problem, be it global or regional, can be solved without the constructive participation of Russia."

In late 2020, Russian lawmakers Vyacheslav Nikonov and Yevgeny Fyodorov made remarks on how the entire Kazakhstani territory was a gift given by the Soviet Union and that was currently being leased by Russia. This sparked backlash from the Kazakh Ministry of Foreign Affairs which warned about severing relations between both nations due to "provocative attacks". In response to controversial statements, Tokayev in response on Egemen Qazaqstan, wrote that such words from "some foreign citizens" are aimed at "spoiling" relations between two states, insisting that "nobody from outside gave Kazakhs this large territory as a gift."
