= Kashagan Field =

Offshore oil field in Kazakhstan's zone of the Caspian Sea

- Location within Caspian Sea
- Country: Kazakhstan
- Region: Pre-Caspian Basin
- Location: Near Atyrau
- Offshore/onshore: Offshore
- Coordinates: 46°10′N 51°35′E
- Operator: North Caspian Operating Company
- Partners: Eni (16.81%); KazMunayGas (16.88%); Royal Dutch Shell (16.81%); TotalEnergies (16.81%); ExxonMobil (16.81%); China National Petroleum Corporation (8.4%); Inpex (7.56%)

Field history
- Discovery: 2000
- Start of development: 2001
- Start of production: Sept. 2013
- Abandonment: after 2040

Production
- Current production of oil: 400,000 barrels per day (~2.0×10^{7} t/a)
- Year of current production of oil: 2019
- Estimated oil in place: 38,000 million barrels (~5.2×10^{9} t)
- Recoverable oil: 13,000 million barrels (~1.8×10^{9} t)
- Producing formations: Carboniferous limestones

Kashagan Field (Kazakh: Қашаған кен орны, Qaşağan ken orny) is an offshore oil field in Kazakhstan's zone of the Caspian Sea. The field, discovered in 2000, is located in the northern part of the Caspian Sea close to Atyrau and is considered the world's largest discovery in the last 30 years, combined with the Tengiz Field. When discovered, it was the second largest oil field in the world.

It is estimated that the Kashagan Field has recoverable reserves of about 13 billion barrels (2.1×10^{9} m^{3}) of crude oil. Harsh conditions, including sea ice during the winter, temperature variation from −35 to 40 °C (−31 to 104 °F), extremely shallow water and high levels of hydrogen sulfide, together with mismanagement and disputes, make it one of the most challenging oil megaprojects. Commercial production began in September 2013. It has been designated as the main source of supply for the Kazakhstan-China oil pipeline. CNN Money estimates that development of the field had cost US$116 billion as of 2012, which made it the most expensive energy project in the world, while other sources report the cost at up to $50 billion.

A stake in the field was acquired by the Chinese government in September 2013 after General Secretary of the Chinese Communist Party Xi Jinping struck a deal with Kazakhstan for around $5 billion.

== History ==
Interest in the Caspian Sea first began in 1992 when an exploration program was announced by the Kazakh government. They sought the interest of over 30 companies to partake in the exploration. In 1993 the Kazakhstancaspiishelf was formed which consisted of Eni, BG Group, BP/Statoil, Mobil, Royal Dutch Shell and TotalEnergies, along with the Kazakh government. This consortium lasted 4 years until 1997, when seismic exploration of the Caspian Sea was undertaken.

Upon completion of an initial 2D seismic survey in 1997, the company became Offshore Kazakhstan International Operating Company (OKIOC). In 1998 Phillips Petroleum Company and Inpex joined the consortium. Kashagan was discovered in 2000.

The consortium changed when it was decided that one company was to operate the field instead of joint operatorship as had been agreed before. Eni was named the exclusive operator in 2001. In 2001 BP/Statoil sold their stake in the project to the remaining partners. With Eni as the operator, the project was renamed Agip Kazakhstan North Caspian Operating Company NV (Agip KCO).

In 2003, BG Group attempted to sell their stake in the project to two Chinese companies, CNOOC and Sinopec. However, the deal did not go through due to the partners' exercise of their pre-emptive privileges. Eventually, in 2004 the Kazakh government bought half of BG's stake in the contract, with the other half shared out among other five Western partners in the consortium that had exercised their pre-emptive rights. The sale was worth approximately $1.2 billion. The Kazakh stake was transferred to the state-owned oil company KazMunayGas. On 27 September 2007, the parliament of Kazakhstan approved a law enabling the government to alter or cancel contracts with foreign oil companies if their actions were threatening national interests.

With the Republic of Kazakhstan appointing Maksat Idenov to lead negotiations, KazMunayGas further increased its stake in January 2008, after its six partners and the Kazakh government agreed on compensation for the probable five-year delay that was taken in developing the field. Eni operated this project under the JV company named Agip Kazakhstan North Caspian Operating Company N.V. (AgipKCO). Following the agreements reached on 31 October 2008 between Kazakh authorities and co-ventures under the North Caspian PSA (NCPSA), operatorship of the NCPSA was formally transferred from AGIP KCO to a new company, North Caspian Operating Company (NCOC), on 23 January 2009.

In October 2008, Agip KCO handed a $31 million letter of intent for FEED work on phase two to a joint venture of Aker Solutions, WorleyParsons and CB&I. WorleyParsons and Aker Solutions are also engaged in phase one, carrying out engineering services, fabrication and hook-up.

In November 2012, ONGC Videsh agreed to buy ConocoPhillips's 8.4% stake. The Kazakh government, however, decided in July 2013 to use its pre-emptive right to buy ConocoPhillips's stake, which it sold to CNPC later that year. The deal was already approved by Eni.

On 11 September 2013, Kashagan began oil production after years of delay, with ExxonMobil and ConocoPhillips planning to increase production over the next several years. The Oil and Gas Minister of Kazakhstan has estimated the oil field will pump 8 million tonnes of oil in 2014.

When the pipeline was shut down, Hydrogen Sulfide remaining in the pipe was burned off as an emergency measure, releasing sulfur dioxide into the atmosphere. As a result, in March 2014, Kazakhstan's environment ministry levied a fine upon the operating companies of $735 million.

== Geology ==
The Kashagan contract area covers an area of over 5,500 square kilometres (2,100 sq mi) and consists of five separate fields, producing formations from the Precaspian Basin. These fields are Kashgan, Kalamkas A, Kashagan Southwest, Aktote and the Kairan.

Kashagan is a carbonate platform of Late Devonian to middle Carboniferous age. The "reef" is about 75 kilometres (47 mi) long and 35 kilometres (22 mi) across with a narrow neck joining two broader platforms (Kashagan East and Kashagan West). The top of the reservoir is about 4,500 metres (14,800 ft) below sea level and the oil column extends for over 1,000 metres (3,300 ft). The field is in very shallow water, 3 to 9 metres (9.8 to 29.5 ft) deep. The seal is middle Permian shale and late Permian salt. The reservoir consists of limestones with low porosities and permeabilities. The oil is a light oil with 45 API gravity with a high gas-oil ratio and hydrogen sulphide (H_{2}S) content of 19%. The field is heavily pressurized, which presents a significant drilling challenge. The figures for oil in place range between 30 and 50 billion barrels (4.8 and 7.9 billion cubic metres) with a common publicly quoted figure of 38 billion barrels (6.0×10^{9} m^{3}). The recovery factor is relatively low (15-25%) due to reservoir complexity, with between 4 and 13 billion barrels (640 and 2,070 million cubic metres) being the estimated ultimate recoverable resource. Three of the other fields in the contract area, Kashagan SW, Kairan, and Aktote, are also Carboniferous carbonate platforms. Kalamkas offshore has a Jurassic sandstone reservoir.

=== Repairs ===
The original pipeline that went to production in September 2013, leaked immediately. This was because the pipe metallurgy was susceptible to high levels of wet H_{2}S found in the Kashagahan oil. The old pipeline was replaced by an inconel cladded steel pipe. This pipeline is expected to go into production 23 October 2016.

== Development ==
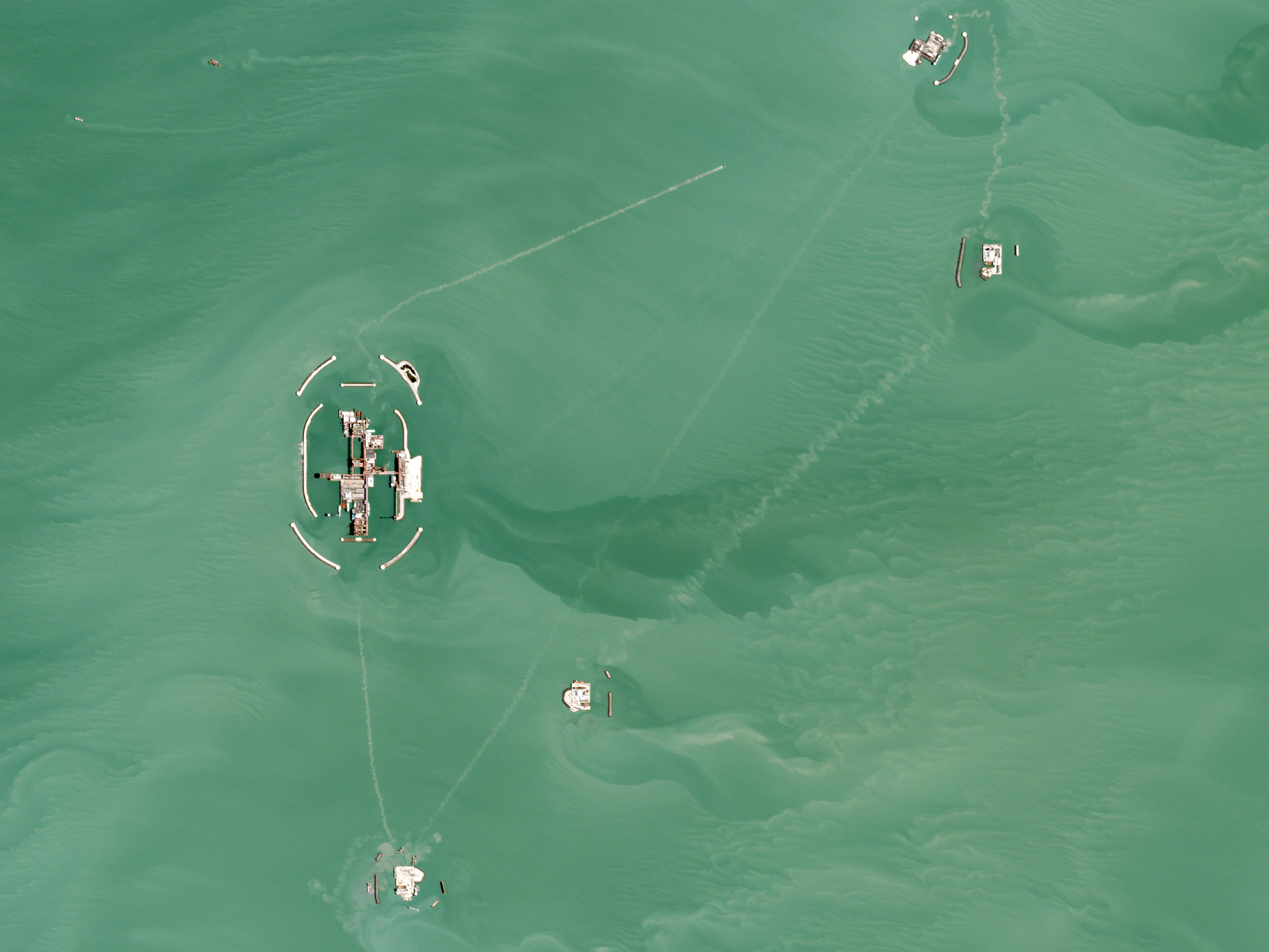
Aerial view of the field structures

The field is developed by the international consortium under the North Caspian Sea Production Sharing Agreement. The Agreement is made up of 7 companies consisting of Eni (16.81%), Royal Dutch Shell (16.81%), TotalEnergies (16.81%), ExxonMobil (16.81%), KazMunayGas (16.81%), China National Petroleum Corporation (8.4%), Inpex (7.56%).

Development of the Kashagan offshore facilities from 2000 to 2026, shown in Landsat satellite imagery.

The main development for the field operation is a structure named Island D, connected with 12 oil wells. It consists of two trains of production, separating oil and gas, delivering them to the onshore plant and dehydrating and partly re-injecting the sour gas into the reservoir. In 2012, about 5,000 workers were employed there. Oil is transported onshore by a 92-kilometre (57 mi) long pipeline. Workers are accommodated on the living quarters barge Vivaldi delivered by Wagenborg Offshore in cooperation with Wagenborg Kazakhstan B.V. and Ersai Caspian Contractor LLC.

The initial production is expected to be 90,000 barrels per day (14,000 m^{3}/d). It should reach a production rate of 370,000 barrels per day (59,000 m^{3}/d).

== Oil production ==
Kashagan sent its first crude for export in the amount of 26,500 metric tons in October 2016. North Caspian Operating Co., which took over running of the field from Eni SpA in 2009, said it is working to gradually increase production capacity to a target level of 370,000 barrels a day by the end of 2017. The commercial output of oil started at Kashagan in November 2016.

The Kashagan field produced over 450,000 tonnes of raw materials as of November 2016. Over 350,000 tonnes of oil from the Kashagan field was transported through the Caspian Pipeline Consortium (CPC) pipeline in 2016. In 2019 the field produced 400,000 barrels of oil per day.

== In popular culture ==
The machinations of nations and oil companies competing for rights to exploit the Kashagan Field play a major role in Victor Robert Lee's espionage novel Performance Anomalies.

== See also ==
- Oil and gas basins of Kazakhstan
- North Caspian Operating Company (NCOC)
- Trans-Caspian Oil Pipeline
