= Korolev oil field =

Oil field in Mangystau, Kazakhstan

Korolev Oil Field
- Country: Kazakhstan
- Region: Mangystau Province
- Offshore/onshore: onshore
- Operator: Tengizchevroil

Field history
- Discovery: 1986
- Start of development: 1986
- Start of production: 1993

Production
- Current production of oil: 60,000 barrels per day (~3.0×10^{6} t/a)
- Estimated oil in place: 201 million tonnes (~ 240×10^{6} m^{3} or 1500 million bbl)

The Korolev Oil Field is an oil field located in Mangystau Province. It was discovered in 1986 and developed by Tengizchevroil. The oil field is operated and owned by Tengizchevroil. The total proven reserves of the Korolev oil field are around 1.5 billion barrels (201 million tonnes), and production is centered on 60,000 barrels per day (9,500 m^{3}/d).
