= LukArco =

LukArco B.V.
- Industry: Oil and gas
- Founded: February 1997
- Parent: Lukoil

LukArco B.V. is a subsidiary of the Russian oil company Lukoil. It was formed in February 1997 as a joint venture between Lukoil and the former American oil company ARCO.

In 2000, ARCO merged with the UK oil company BP, and BP became a shareholder of LukArco with a 46% stake. In December 2009, BP sold its stake to Lukoil, making Lukoil the sole shareholder of LukArco.

LukArco is a partner in the Caspian Pipeline Consortium with a shareholding of 12.5%, and is a partner in the consortium Tengizchevroil (TCO). LukArco owns a 5 percent share at Tengiz.
