= Tengiz Field =

Oil field in Kazakhstan

- Location of the Tengiz Field on the coast of Caspian Sea
- Country: Kazakhstan
- Offshore/onshore: Onshore
- Coordinates: 46°9′10″N 53°23′0″E
- Operator: Tengizchevroil
- Partners: Chevron Overseas (50%), ExxonMobil (25%), JSC NK Kazmunaigas (20%), LukArko (5%)

Field history
- Discovery: 1979
- Start of production: 1993
- Peak year: 2025

Production
- Current production of oil: 932,000 barrels per day (~4.64×10^{7} t/a)
- Estimated oil in place: 25,500 million barrels (~3.48×10^{9} t)

Tengiz field (Kazakh: Теңіз мұнай кен орны, Teñız mūnai ken orny) is an oil field located in Zhylyoi District, Atyrau Region, northwestern Kazakhstan.

== Geography ==
The oil field is located in an area of low-lying wetlands along the northeast shores of the Caspian Sea. It covers a 2,500 km^{2} (970 mi^{2}) project license area which also includes a smaller Korolev field as well as several exploratory prospects.

Sizewise, Tengiz reservoir is 19 km (12 mi) wide and 21 km (13 mi) long. Discovered in 1979, Tengiz oil field is one of the largest discoveries in recent history. The city of Atyrau, 350 kilometres (220 mi) north of Tengiz, is the main transport hub of Tengiz oil. Many nations are involved in a large geopolitical competition to secure access to this source of oil.

== History ==
The Tengiz field, first discovered in 1979, has recoverable reserves estimated at between six billion and nine billion barrels. The field was jointly developed in 1993 as a 40-year venture of Chevron Texaco (50%), KazMunayGas (20%), US ExxonMobil (25%) and LukArco (5%). The joint venture company is known as Tengizchevroil (TCO). Chevron is the operator of the TCO field. The Tengiz oil fields entered a new phase of production with the construction of its Second Generation Project (SGP) and the introduction of sour gas injection (SGI). This onshore development, which has been in the planning and approval stage since 2002, began in 2004 and required a total investment of $7.4bn. The integrated project was completed in the second half of 2008.

Prior to its expansion in 2008, the Tengiz oilfield had 53 wells, tapping a column of crude oil around 1.6km thick. When the field was first tapped its oil pressure was 12,000psi, but in 2004 the pressure came down to 10,000psi in most areas and 8,500psi in others. The SGI project used gas injection technology to boost the pressure and increase oil recovery, while the SGP increased the number of producers (wells) and improved and expanded the crude export infrastructure.

The Tengiz field’s production of crude in 2004 was 13 million tonnes per year but the SGI and SGP production increased this to over 25 million tonnes. TCO crude oil production capacity was increased by about 80% to 540,000 barrels of crude oil, 46,000 barrels of natural gas liquids and 760 million cubic feet of natural gas.

The two projects created over 7,000 jobs in Kazakhstan and aided the development of the economy. A total investment of $20bn is envisaged for the duration of the 40 years of the Tengiz oil field venture.

Tengizchevroil intends to export more of the Tengiz field’s additional capacity via the Caspian Pipeline Consortium (CPC) pipeline, running the 1,500km from Tengiz to the Russian Black Sea port of Novorossiysk (thus solving the export problem from the remote Tengiz field).

Net daily production in 2019 (Chevron share) averaged 290,000 barrels of crude oil, 419 million cubic feet of natural gas and 21,000 barrels of natural gas liquid.

The integrated Future Growth Project-Wellhead Pressure Management Project (FGP-WPMP) is designed to further increase total daily production from the Tengiz reservoir and maximize the ultimate recovery of resources.

The FGP will use state-of-the-art sour gas injection technology, successfully developed and proven during TCO’s previous expansion in 2008, to increase daily crude oil production from Tengiz by approximately 260,000 barrels per day.

Kazakhstan finalized the consortium agreement with Chevron in 1993. In 1997, Lukoil purchased 5% in the Tengiz project from Chevron, and in 2000, Chevron built up its interest in the project to 50% by acquiring additional shares from Kazakhstan. In 2003, Fluor was awarded the rights to develop the Second Generation Plant (SGP) and Sour Gas Injection (SGI) project, which were expected to double production. In 2004, the Tengiz Consortium raised $1.1 billion in senior secured bonds to finance these two projects. These two projects were expected to finish in 2006, but were delayed. In October 2006, the Tengizchevroil joint venture experienced riots. Shortly after in 2007, the Republic of Kazakhstan invited Maksat Idenov as First Vice President of Kazmunaigas and Chairman of the Partnership Council of the Tengizchevroil Joint Venture. During Idenov's tenure, the SGP and SGI expansion projects (worth over $6.9 billion) were completed in the second part of 2008, and stakeholder engagement began for the Future Growth Project (FGP) in 2009. In 2012, TengizChevroil began the Future Growth Project (FGP), whose aim is to continue to increase the field's production. In 2014, Chevron and its partners, KazMunaiGas, ExxonMobil and Lukoil began the process of selecting engineering companies to work on the engineering, procurement and construction (EPC) contract for the Future Growth Project, which will further expand the TCO oil field.

=== Conflict ===
In 2006 during the SGP project an argument between Turkish and Kazakh workers led to an outbreak of violence. 115 Turkish citizens were evacuated for medical treatment.

In 2019 during the 3GP project dozens of Arab expat workers were injured during violence sparked by a photograph shared on social media among foreign workers and was considered offensive by local Kazakh employees.. Photos of the attacks on Arab expats were spread online throughout the Arab world, leading to a diplomatic dispute between Kazakhstan and several Arab countries including Jordan and Lebanon.

== Reserves and production ==
Estimated at up to 25 billion barrels (4.0×10^{9} m^{3}) of oil originally in place, Tengiz is the sixth largest oil field in the world; recoverable crude oil reserves from Tengiz and Korolev fields combined have been estimated at 6 to 9 billion barrels (950×10^{6} to 1,430×10^{6} m^{3}). Korolev field alone holds 1.5 billion barrels (240×10^{6} m^{3}) of oil making it one-sixth the size of Tengiz. Like many other oil fields, the Tengiz also contains large reserves of natural gas. The field is one of the world's largest oil fields, rivaling the Gulf of Mexico in reserves of oil.

Since the oil from Tengiz contains a high amount of sulfur (up to 17%), an estimated 6 million tons of sulfur byproduct were stored in the form of large sulfur blocks as of December 2002. At the time, about 4,000 tonnes a day was being added. On 3 October 2007, the Kazakh environment ministry was reported to be considering imposing fines against TCO for alleged breaches in the way the sulfur is stored.

In 2002, TCO produced 285,000 barrels per day (45,300 m^{3}/d), or one third of Kazakhstan's daily production. In January 2003, after contentious negotiations with the government of Kazakhstan, the TCO consortium members initiated a $3 billion expansion project designed to boost production to approximately 450,000 barrels per day (72,000 m^{3}/d) by 2006. In September 2008, Chevron Corporation announced that the major expansion of Tengiz field was completed and it would boost the production capacity to 540,000 barrels per day (86,000 m^{3}/d). In 2012 Chevron announced the field will see its total daily production increase by 250,000-300,000 barrels, bringing production above 500,000 barrels per day.

An area of major geopolitical competition involves the routing of oil out of this oil field. Oil from the Tengiz field is primarily routed to the Russian Black Sea port of Novorossiysk through the Caspian Pipeline Consortium (CPC) project. The Baku–Tbilisi–Ceyhan pipeline is an alternative pipeline developed by U.S. and UK interests originating in the Southern Caspian which is the principal export route for crude from Azerbaijan and bypasses dependence on the Russian pipeline. In addition, Total S.A. is interested in developing a pipeline south through Iran, which is theoretically the cheapest route due to the geopolitical climate involving Iran, however, the United States does not favor this route.

In early 2025, the Tengiz oil field's production reached a peak of 870,000 barrels per day in January, following the start of its expansion project. While the field reached this peak in January, Chevron and Kazakhstan's Ministry of Energy predicted it would reach its full production capacity of approximately 1 million barrels per day later in the year. By May 2025, production hit 932,000 barrels per day, with the government stating that it had reached its planned capacity and would not increase further for the remainder of the year.

== Environmental concerns ==
The oil from Tengiz field comes out of the wells hot and at a very high pressure, believed to be the highest in the world. It also contains large proportion of gas which is rich in the compound hydrogen sulfide yielding poisonous sulfur.

=== 1985 explosion ===
On 23 June 1985 an explosion occurred after oil and gas violently made its way to the surface from a depth of 4 km, causing a 200-metre (660 ft)-high, 50-metre (160 ft) wide column of fire visible from 140 kilometres (87 mi), killing one man. The deadly gas made it impossible for Soviet firefighters to quickly extinguish the fire. The well was not extinguished until over a year later on 27 July 1986 and was finally capped.

The fire caused severe environmental damage, with long lasting pollution in a radius of over 100 km, due to the release of 900,000 tons of soot, 3.4 million tons of oil, 1.7 billion m³ of gas and 850 tons of mercaptans. Illnesses in the Atyrau region increased by 50% and an estimated one million birds died.

=== Later developments ===
The government of the Kazakhstan imposed stricter guidelines for handling the sulfur. In 2006, Kazakh government threatened TengizChevroil with imposing fines. In 2007, the government imposed a $609 million (74.4 billion tenge) fine on TengizChevroil. The violations included a slow progress in dealing with vast sulfur stocks at Tengiz. The company had reportedly been fined $71 million in 2003 for open air sulfur storage as well, which was then reduced to $7 million on an appeal. According to the Environmental Protection Ministry, over 10 million tonnes of sulfur was accumulated near Tengiz oil field as a by-product of crude oil production.

Government had also set a requirement to relocate the village of Sarykamys which had 3,500 residents to new homes in the vicinity of Atyrau. The relocation program was funded by TengizChevroil and was done in 2004-2006. It cost the company $73 million.

In his book Poor People, published in 2007, William T. Vollmann dedicates a significant amount of his attention to the native peoples living in Sarykamys and Atyrau and the effects of TengizChevroil's presence in these towns. Vollmann's account suggests that serious and widespread health risks were imposed upon the people of Sarykamys. Vollmann also suggests that in the corporation's efforts to displace the natives, many were not compensated fairly, so that upon being forced to move from their existing homes, they were unable to find or afford comparable housing in a new town.

== Geology ==
The sedimentary section of the pre-Caspian basin varies between 5 km to 24 km and is dominated by the Permian Kungurian salt, which is overlain by the later (post-salt) deposits of Upper Permian, Mesozoic and Cenozoic all deformed by salt tectonics and earlier (pre-salt) Paleozoic and upper Proterozoic carbonates and terrigenous sediments. Reflection seismology in 1975 revealed the Karaton tectonic uplift, which was 400 km^{2} in area and 1 km in relief, at a depth of 4 km. An exploratory well was drilled in 1979, discovering "significant oil flow" from the middle Carboniferous carbonates overlain by Lower Permian clays and the massive Permian salt.

Stratigraphy starts with the Upper Devonian Famennian Stage consisting of homogeneous biogenic limestone and some thin dolomite interbedding, followed by Lower Carboniferous deposits consisting of Tournaisian, Visean and Namurian Stage limestones. Next comes the Middle Carboniferous Bashkirian Stage limestones, and then the Lower Permian Artinksian Stage argillaceous sediments. The carbonate buildup is up to 4 km thick and form an angular unconformity to the overlying Permian sediments.

== In pop culture ==
The Tengiz oil field was mentioned in the film Syriana (2005) starring George Clooney.

== See also ==
- Kashagan Field
- Kazakhstan-China oil pipeline
- Oil and gas basins of Kazakhstan
- Trans-Caspian Oil Pipeline
