= Kurmangazy oil field =

Kazakh oil field in the Caspian Sea

- Country: Kazakhstan
- Region: Caspian Sea
- Offshore/onshore: Offshore
- Operators: Kurmangazy Petroleum Company
- Partners: KazMunayGas; Rosneft

Production
- Estimated oil in place: 7,000 million barrels (~9.5×10^{8} t)

The Kurmangazy oil field is an offshore oil field located in the Kazakh section of the Caspian Sea on the maritime border between Russia and Kazakhstan, about 120 kilometres (70 mi) west of the Buzachi Peninsula. It is expected to be the third largest oil field of Kazakhstan. The field is named after Kurmangazy Sagyrbayuly.

== History ==
The first agreement concerning Kurmangazy field was signed in 2002. The US$23 billion worth PSA agreement was signed with KazMunayGas and Rosneft on 6 June 2005. In May 2006, the first well was drilled into the structure; however, it failed to strike oil.

The 2009 drilling campaign at the Kurmangazy field was unsuccessful in finding commercially viable oil deposits, leading partners KazMunayGas and Rosneft to acknowledge the failure of the initial exploration efforts. This outcome followed a previous dry well drilled in 2006, raising significant questions about the field's commercial potential. The joint venture partners, the state oil companies of Kazakhstan and Russia, were forced to rethink their approach. Following the failure of the 2009 well, the development of the Kurmangazy field is effectively stalled.

== Reserves ==
The oil field has estimated reserves of 7 to 10 billion barrels (1.1 to 1.6 billion cubic metres).

== Operator ==
The field is operated by Kurmangazy Petroleum Company. KazMunayTeniz, a subsidiary of KazMunayGas, owns 50% of the project and RN – Kazakhstan LLС, a subsidiary of Rosneft, owns 25%. Originally, 25% of shares was assigned to Zarubezhneft, but later Rosneft received the option on this remaining stake once commercial extraction commences. Total S.A. and ONGC have shown interest to join the project.

== See also ==
- Energy in Kazakhstan
