= North Caspian Operating Company =

Kazakhstani gas company

Company logo

North Caspian Operating Company (NCOC) is an operating company for the North Caspian Sea Production Sharing Agreement (NCSPSA). NCOC is based in Atyrau, Kazakhstan. The agreement includes seven companies consisting of KazMunayGas, Eni, ExxonMobil, Shell, Total S.A. (16.88% each), China National Petroleum Corporation (8.4%) and Inpex (7.56%).

== Company ==
NCOC was created in 2009 taking responsibilities from Agip KCO and then merged with NCOC N.V. and NCPOC B.V. The offices of NCOC are in Atyrau, Kazakhstan. As of July 2015, the company employed 2584 personnel. Managing Director is Giancarlo Ruiu.

== Production ==
Production began on 11 September 2013 and was halted on 24 September 2013 after experiencing pipe failures. The project went through a complete pipe replacement. Production from the Kashagan Field resumed in October 2016 with an initial production of 75,000 barrels per day.
