= Oil and gas basins of Kazakhstan =

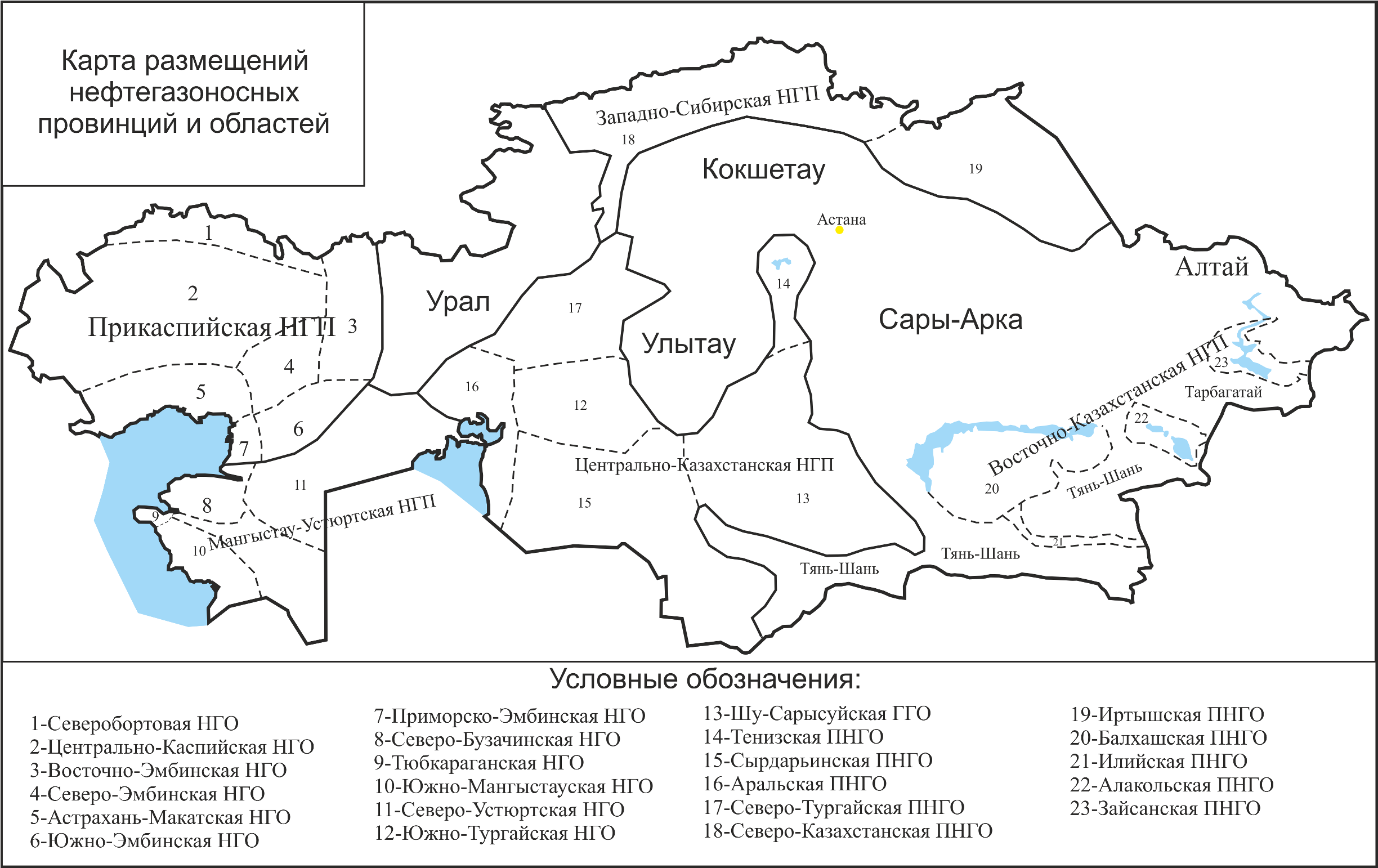
Oil and gas basins of Kazakhstan

The oil and gas basins of Kazakhstan can be grouped into four revealed or prospective oil and gas provinces in the Republic of Kazakhstan. Exploration in those provinces in which oil and gas has already been extracted had, by 2010, led to the discovery of more than 200 oil, gas, oil-and-gas and condensate hydrocarbon accumulations. Of these, the Kashagan, the Tengiz and the Karachaganak fields can be considered giants.

== Oil and gas basins of Kazakhstan ==
Kazakhstan has a share in four oil and gas provinces:

1. The Pre-Caspian Basin lies in the western part of the country, behind the Mugalzhar mountains. The geology of this province is made up of Paleozoic sediments covering a Proterozoic basement.

- Southern Emba
- Northern Emba
- Eastern Emba
- Primorsk-Emba
- Northern Pre-Caspian
- Western Pre-Caspian
- Northern Caspian
- Central Pre-Caspian

2. The Mangistau-Usturt Basin lies in the Mangistau and Aktobe areas of Kazakhstan.

- South Mangyshlak
- Northern Buzashi
- Northern Usturt

3. The Central Kazakhstan Basin lies in the eastern and southern areas of Kazakhstan.

- Southern Torgay
- Eastern Aral
- Syr-Darya
- Chu-Sarysu
- Teniz
- Alakol
- Balkash
- Zaysan
- Ily

4. The Western Siberian Basin is in the northern and northeastern region of Kazakhstan, north of the Kokshetauskikh mountains. The geology is of a platform type, with a Mesozoic cover overlying a Paleozoic basement.

- Northern Kazakhstan
- Irtish

The basins are located in six provinces of Kazakhstan: Aktobe, Atyrau, West Kazakhstan, Karaganda, Kyzylorda and Mangystau provinces.
