= KEGOC =

Astana-based state company of Kazakhstan

KEGOC JSC
- Native name: Казахстанская компания по управлению электрическими сетями, lit. 'Kazakhstan Electricity Grid Operating Company'
- Type: Quasi-public corporation
- Traded as: KASE: KEGC
- Industry: Power engineering
- Founded: 11 July 1997
- Headquarters: Kazakhstan: Astana
- Key people: Nabi Aitzhanov (CEO)
- Products: Electrical grid
- Services: Electric power transmission
- Number of employees: >4 thousand (2020)
- Parent: Samruk Kazyna (90%)
- Subsidiaries: EnergoInform JSC (100%); Financial Settlement Centre for Renewable Energy Sources LLP (FSC RES) (100%); Batys Transit (20%)
- Website: www.kegoc.kz/en

The Kazakhstan Electricity Grid Operating Company (KEGOC) is an Astana-based state joint-stock company of Kazakhstan established in 1997.

== General information ==
KEGOC is the System Operator of the Unified Power System (UPS) of Kazakhstan, and it owns and manages the assets of the National Power Grid (NPG). The company operates as the natural monopoly.

The company employs more than 4 thousand people.

KEGOC is a subsidiary of Samruk-Kazyna Sovereign Welfare Fund JSC.

In December 2014, the company was listed on the Kazakhstan Stock Exchange as part of the "People's IPO" programme. KEGOC floated 10% minus one share. The minority shareholder structure included 7.3% of individuals. The demand exceeded supply by 1.5 times.

== Projects ==
Completed projects:

- Kazakhstan Electricity Transmission Rehabilitation Project, stage 1 (2000—2010);
- Construction of 500 kV Second Transmission Line of Kazakhstan North-South Transit (2004—2009);
- Alma Electricity Transmission Project (2009—2014);
- Moinak Electricity Transmission Project (2010—2012);
- Ossakarovka Transmission Rehabilitation Project (2010—2014);
- Construction of 500 kV North-South-East transmission line. stage 1. Construction of 500 kV Ekibastuz — Shulbinsk HPP — Ust-Kamenogorsk transmission line (2011—2017);
- Construction of 500 kV North-South-East transmission line. stage 2. Construction of 500 kV North-South-East transmission line Construction of 500 kV Shulbinsk HPP — Aktogai — Taldykorgan - Alma transmission line (2012—2018);
- Pavlodar Electricity Transmission Reinforcement (2011—2019);
- Kazakhstan Electricity Transmission Rehabilitation Project, phase 2 (2010—2019).

Ongoing projects:

- Rehabilitation of 220-500 kV OHTLs in Aktyubinskiye MES branch, Zapadnye MES branch and Sarbaiskiye MES branch of KEGOC, Stage I (2018—2022);
- West Kazakhstan Electricity Transmission Reinforcement Project: Construction of power grid facilities (2018—2023);
- Turkestan External Power Supply Reinforcement Project: Construction of power grid facilities (2019—2022).

== Subsidiaries ==
KEGOC has subsidiaries: EnergoInform JSC (100% of shares) and Financial Settlement Centre for Renewable Energy Sources LLP (FSC RES) (100% of participation shares). EnergoInform is engaged in maintenance of the telecom equipment in the national power grid and provide telecom support for the KEGOC's operations.

Financial Settlement Centre for Renewable Energy Sources LLP (FSC RES LLP) was established in 2013 to encourage investments in renewable energy sector and increase the share of renewable energy in Kazakhstan's energy mix through government-guaranteed and centralized electricity purchase of all electricity produced by all renewable energy facilities (who have chosen such support scheme) in accordance with the fixed rates. Also FSC RES LLP was assigned by the Minister of Energy of the Republic of Kazakhstan (order No. 357 dated 7 September 2018 ) the single buyer of centralized procurement of services service of maintaining the readiness of electric capacity and centralized provider of services of ensuring readiness of electricity capacity to bear the power load (capacity market operator).

KEGOC is also a co-founder (20% of shares) of Batys Transit JSC established in 2005 to implement the project for construction of inter-regional power transmission line linking North Kazakhstan with Aktobe oblast.

== See also ==
- Ministry of Energy of Kazakhstan
- Samruk Kazyna

== Notes ==
1. Management board
2. Asset structure
