= Bogatyr Coal =

Largest coal mining company in Kazakhstan

Bogatyr Komir
- Bogatyr Kohle Logo
- Type: Private
- Industry: mining
- Founded: 1913
- Headquarters: Ekibastuz, Kazakhstan
- Key people: Schukin, Viktor Konstantinovich, CEO
- Products: coal (metallurgical)
- Revenue: US$ 300 million (2007)
- Number of employees: 20,000 (2006)
- Website: www.bogatyr.kz

Bogatyr Coal (Kazakh: Богатырь Көмір, Bogatyr Kómir; Russian Богатырь Комир; English Bogatyr Coal), formerly known as Bogatyr Access Komyr, is the largest coal mining company in Kazakhstan. As of 2018, the company produced 42 million tonnes of coal, accounting for approximately 40% of the country's coal output that year. The company has mined approximately 1 gigatonne of coal in its history, and has 2.5 additional gigatonnes of coal reserves, making it one of the largest coal companies in the world. Bogatyr Komir operates two mines, the Bogatyr Mine and the Severny Mine.

== History ==
=== Background ===
The discovery of coal in the Ekibastuz Basin, where Bogatyr Komir does much of its mining, dates back to the 1867, which was first exploited by a company named Voskresenskiy Mining JSC around the turn of the century. By 1913 an English company named Kirgizian Mining Joint Stock Company (Note: About the name ""Kirgizian Mining": in Russian empire all nomad peoples in the area were known as Kirgizs. The correct identification was introduced during the national delimitation in the Soviet Union) began operations in the area, back by major stakeholders such as Leslie Urquhart and Herbert Hoover. In 1918 the Soviet Union nationalized the area's coal industry. The Ekibastuz Basin got its first coal mine, named "Central Mine", in 1954, which began producing 3 million tons of coal per year. Coal from this mine has since been used to power coal fired plants of the southern Ural region of the present-day Russian Federation, including plants in Troitsk and Krasnogorsk specifically designed for the high-ash coal the mine produced. From 1965 till 1979 the capacity of the open-cast mine was expanded to reach 50 million tons of coal per year, and the mine reached an output of 56.8 million tons of coal in 1985.

=== Foundation ===
In September 1996, the national company "JSC Ekibastuzkomir" (and its mine Bogatyr) was privatized by the Kazakh government, the American company Access Industries bought the 70%-property of Bogatyr mine and Stepnoy mine, and the name was changed to Bogatyr Access Komyr, LLP. Later on the American company sold the mines to the Russian company United Company RUSAL, the world’s largest vertically integrated aluminum producer, that ensured stable fuel supply to Urals thermal power stations that provide electricity for RUSAL’s Urals plants.

On November 29, 2007, a joint venture was established between UC RUSAL and Samruk-Energo (the energy branch of Kazakh state holding Samruk, to operate the coal mines of Bogatyr Access Komir. The rationale for this deal was the intention of the Kazakh government to return coal reserves into state ownership due to their strategic importance for Kazakhstan's electric power sector. On April 16, 2008 it was announced that the price Samruk Energo had to pay to UC RUSAL for a 50-% stake was 345 million USD.

A deal in 2008 saw the company's management transferred to a joint venture between Samruk-Energy JSC, which is wholly owned by Samruk-Kazyna, and the Russian firm RUSAL. In March 2009, the company was renamed from Bogatyr Access Komir, LLP to Bogatyr Coal, LLP.

Bogatyr Komir has plans to modernize its Bogatyr Mine and expand its Severny Mine by 2020, which would increase the company's annual production capacity to 58 million tonnes of coal per year. The company has taken out a number of loans from the Eurasian Development Bank for the purpose of achieving this goal.

== Bogatyr Mine ==
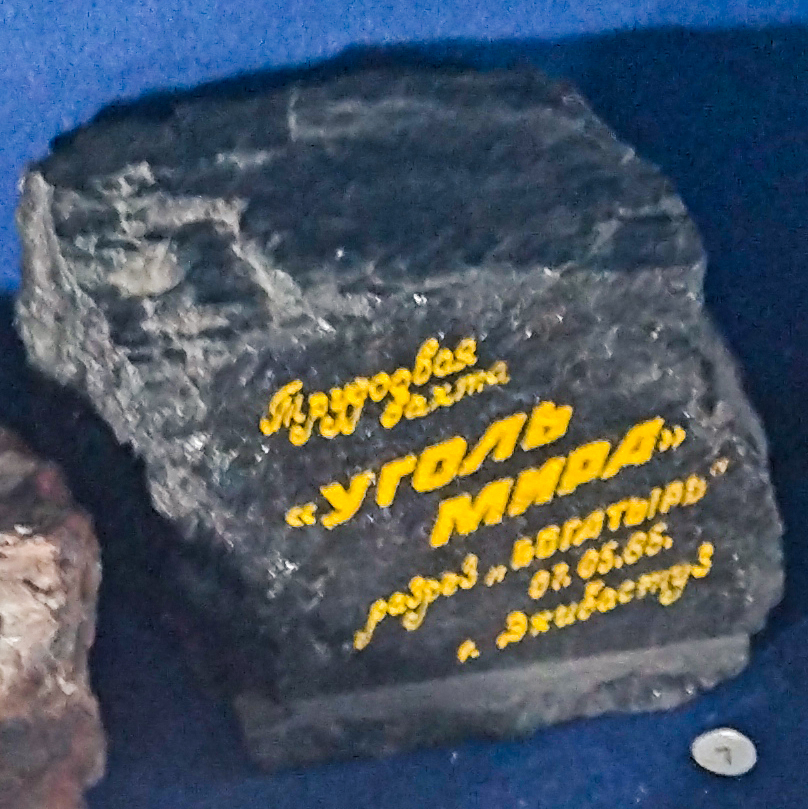
1985 "Coal of the World" souvenir rock from the Bogatyr Mine

The company operates the Bogatyr Mine, near the city of Ekibastuz in Pavlodar Region of Kazakhstan. With an output of 56.8 million tonnes of coal in 1985, the Bogatyr Mine entered the Guinness Book of World Records for being the world's largest single coal mine. Since then this level of production was not sustained, and in 2007 the production of the mine was 40 million tons of coal. Together with the neighbouring Severnyi mine, the oldest mine in the Ekibastuz coal basin, they hold reserves estimated at 4.5 billion ton of coal, which at the current production rate give them a residual lifetime of over 100 years.
