= Samruk-Kazyna =

Sovereign wealth fund of Kazakhstan

- Native name: Samūryq-Qazyna; Самұрық-Қазына
- Type: Joint stock sovereign wealth fund
- Industry: Conglomerate
- Predecessor: Samruk and Kazyna
- Founded: 2008
- Headquarters: Astana
- Key people: Olzhas Bektenov (Chairman of the Board of Directors); Nurlan Zhakupov (CEO)
- Revenue: 5.124 bln KZT
- Total assets: $81 billion
- Owner: Government of Kazakhstan
- Number of employees: 312,400
- Subsidiaries: KazMunayGas, Kazatomprom, Kazakhstan Temir Zholy, Air Astana, Samruk-Energy, KEGOC, Tau Ken Samruk, Kazpost
- Website: Official website

The Samruk-Kazyna (Kazakh: Самұрық-Қазына, romanized: Samūryq-Qazyna, pronounced [sɑmʊ̆rʊ́q qɑzɤ̆nɑ́]), officially known as the Sovereign Wealth Fund "Samruk-Kazyna" Joint Stock Company (Kazakh: «Самұрық-Қазына» Ұлттық әл-ауқат қоры, romanized: «Samūryq–Qazyna» Ūlttyk äl-auqat qory), is a sovereign wealth fund and joint stock company in Kazakhstan. It owns, either wholly or partially, major national companies, including rail, postal services, oil and gas, uranium, and the flag carrier Air Astana. The Government of Kazakhstan is its sole shareholder.

== History ==
Samruk-Kazyna was established in October 2008 through the merger of two state‑owned funds, Samruk and Kazyna, by a decree of President Nursultan Nazarbayev. The fund aims to enhance corporate governance and increase the value of national assets.

The current chairman of the board of directors is Olzhas Bektenov. Previous leaders include Prime Minister Bakhytzhan Sagintayev and Umirzak Shukeyev. Independent directors have included Sir Richard Harry Evans and Wilhelm Bender.

The fund initially consolidated five national companies, later expanding to include 22 entities across the energy, transport, and infrastructure sectors. By 2014, it managed 576 subsidiaries and associated companies.

Samruk-Kazyna is a member of the International Forum of Sovereign Wealth Funds (IFSWF) and adheres to the Santiago Principles, a global standard for sovereign wealth fund governance.

== Subsidiaries ==
Samruk-Kazyna holds significant stakes in key Kazakhstani enterprises, including:

- KazMunayGas (67.42%)
- KEGOC (85%)
- Kazakhtelecom (79.24%)
- Kazpost (100%)
- Air Astana (51%)
- Kazatomprom (75%)
- Kazakhstan Temir Zholy (100%)
- Samruk-Energy (100%)

A full list is maintained on the fund’s official website.

== Privatization ==
The fund has pursued privatization initiatives to attract foreign investment and promote a market-based economy.

== See also ==
- WikiBilim Public Foundation
