= Maksat Idenov =

Maksat B. Idenov

Maksat Idenov is a prominent energy executive within the international oil and gas industry, currently the Executive Vice President at Eni.

Maksat Idenov has been in the oil and gas industry for nearly 30 years, and worked as the First Vice President of KazMunayGas, the National Oil Company of Kazakhstan, and Chairman of the Board of Directors of KazTransOil. Previously, Idenov worked at Royal Dutch Shell as the Regional Vice President on Strategy and Business Development in the Middle East, South Asia, North Africa, and the Caspian Regions. Prior to Shell, Idenov served as the Advisor on Caspian Energy and Export Oil & Gas Pipelines to the Republic of Kazakhstan.

Idenov has managed world-class projects that have revolutionized and redefined the structure of the modern oil world. Through his work with regional governments, national and international oil and gas companies, and international financial and political institutions, Idenov's peers rank him amongst the upper echelon of high executives of international oil and gas companies.

== Awards ==
Maksat Idenov has been the recipient of numerous national honors, such as the Order of Kurmet (2008), granted to the top few nationals who have made outstanding contributions to the economic development of Kazakhstan.

In June 2008, despite a difficult global economic crisis, Maksat Idenov successfully led a team of financial and legal experts to raise USD 3,000,000,000 in non-sovereign bonds for KazMunayGas, Kazakhstan's national oil and gas company. Under the leadership of Idenov, KazMunayGas was awarded the Best Emerging EMEA Bond of the Year Award in 2008, by the International Financing Review in London.

Furthermore, Idenov received the prestigious Ambassador's Award from the American Chamber of Commerce for Best Business Practices of the Year of 2009. Ambassador Richard E. Hoagland personally presented this award to Idenov. Hoagland's speech in Idenov's honor provides a glowing assessment of Idenov's business practices, as he discussed Idenov's "tireless advocacy of good business practices and corporate responsibility."
