= Zhanazhol Field =

Oil field in Kazakhstan

Coordinates: 48.3586°N 57.4786°E

Zhanazhol Field (Kazakh: Жаңажол мұнай-газ конденсат кен орны, Jańajol munaı-gaz kondensat ken orny) is an oil field located in the northwestern region of the Republic of Kazakhstan. It was discovered in the 1960 and have been in production since 1987. Zhanazhol crude oil has a high mercaptan and hydrogen sulfide content.
