= Tengizchevroil =

Kazakh oil field joint venture

Tengizchevroil LLP
- Founded: April 1993; 32 years ago
- Owners: Chevron (50%); ExxonMobil (25%); KazMunayGas (20%); LukArco (5%)

Tengizchevroil is a joint venture between Chevron (50% share in the consortium), ExxonMobil (25% share), KazMunayGas (20% share) and Lukoil (5% share). The joint venture was formed in April 1993, when the government of Kazakhstan granted exclusive 40-year rights to Tengizchevroil LLP (TCO) to develop the Tengiz and Korolevskoye oil fields located in the north-eastern reaches of the Caspian Sea in Kazakhstan.

== History and operations ==
From a two-company joint venture in 1993 (between the Kazakhstani state oil company KazakhOil, now KazMunayGas, and the American oil giant Chevron) Tengizchevroil expanded in 1996–1997 into a four-company consortium: ExxonMobil Kazakhstan Ventures, an ExxonMobil subsidiary, and LukArco, a joint venture between Lukoil and Atlantic Richfield (ARCO), acquired 25% and 5% respectively. In 2000, BP became involved in the business, as BP had merged with Arco and took a 46% share in LukArco. In December 2009, BP sold its stake to Lukoil and thereafter Lukoil became the sole shareholder of LukArco.

In January 2014, the firm reported a record rise in output to 27.1 million tonnes from 24.2 million tonnes.

In mid-2019, BP expressed interest in returning to Kazakhstan. The company signed a memorandum of understanding with KazMunayGas. In 2020, the companies signed an agreement establishing a partnership to explore for hydrocarbons in Kazakhstan. In 2019, its production volume reached 30 million tons. The company employs 4,000 people, about 95% of which are residents of Kazakhstan.
