= KazMunayGas =

State-owned oil and gas company of Kazakhstan

KazMunayGas ҚазМұнайГаз

- Type: State-owned
- Founded: 2002
- Headquarters: Astana, Kazakhstan
- Key people: Ashat Hasenov (CEO); Chris Walton (Chairman of the Board of Directors)
- Products: oil natural gas
- Revenue: US$6.78 billion (2005)
- Net income: US$4.06 billion (2005)
- Number of employees: over 30,000
- Parent: Samruk-Kazyna
- Website: www.kmg.kz

KazMunayGas (KMG; Kazakh: QazMūnaiGaz, ҚазМұнайГаз) is the state-owned oil and gas company of Kazakhstan. It was founded in 2002 by merging CJSC Kazakhoil and CJSC Oil&Gas Transportation.

== History ==
It was formed by the decree of the President of Kazakhstan dated February 20, 2002, through the merger of Kazakhoil CJSC and Oil&Gas Transportation CJSC. The Kazakhoil company was founded in 1997, and Nurlan Balgimbayev became its first president. From May 1997 to March 1999, Timur Kulibayev held the position of Vice President for Economics and Finance at Kazakhoil. In the summer of 2000, Kairat Satybaldy, a nephew of Nursultan Nazarbayev, who in 2002 took the position of Managing Director for Social Affairs, Strategic Planning and Telecommunications at KazMunayGas, became the Vice President of Kazakhoil.

In January 2023, a strategic partnership agreement was signed between JSC NC KazMunayGas and Abu Dhabi Ports Company. The parties expressed interest in cooperation in the development of the marine fleet and coastal infrastructure in the Caspian and Black Seas.

== Subsidiaries ==
Main subsidiaries of KazMunayGas are:

- KazMunaiGas Exploration Production (AO) (KMG EP) – onshore oil and gas exploration and production
- Tengizchevroil (20%) – oil joint venture with Chevron, Lukoil and ExxonMobil
- KazTransOil – oil transportation
  - Port of Batumi – Georgian logistics company
- KazTransGas – gas transportation. Gazprom is its principal customer, accounting for 64% of its consolidated revenue in 2011, down from 75% in 2010.
- KazMunayGas Refining and Marketing – oil refining and marketing
  - Rompetrol (75%) – A Romanian oil company
  - Atyrau Refinery – oil refining
- Kazmortransflot – shipping by tankers
- KazMunayTeniz – offshore oil and gas exploration and production
- Atyrau International Airport
- Eurasia-Air Helicopter Company – helicopter services
- KazMunaiGas Services Compass – Catering and Support Services

KazMunaiGas Exploration Production (AO) has its equity listed in form of common shares and global depositary receipts on the Kazakhstan Stock Exchange and the London Stock Exchange, respectively.

The company has stakes in LLP Kazgermunai JV, JSC Karazhanbasmunai and PetroKazakhstan Inc. Its two noted producing fields are Uzenmunaigas and Embamunaigas.

== Oil refineries ==
KazMunayGas operates 2 oil refineries in Kazakhstan:

- Pavlodar Refinery: 162,600 bbl/d (25,850 m^{3}/d)
- Atyrau Refinery:, 104,400 bbl/d (16,600 m^{3}/d)

KazMunayGas has a US$1.7 billion plan for the modernization of the Atyrau refinery. In August 2012, it obtained a US$297.5 million loan from the Japan Bank for International Cooperation and the Bank of Tokyo Mitsubishi a deep oil refining complex at the Atyrau Oil Refinery. This loan followed a contract awarded to Marubeni to reinforce the production of oil products to suit European environmental standards.

== Shareholders and management ==
Ninety percent of the shares of the company are managed by the national welfare fund Samruk-Kazyna while ten percent belong to the National Bank of Kazakhstan. Chairman of the Board of Directors is Chris Walton, Independent Director. CEO and Chairman of the Management Board is Ashat Hasenov.

== 2011 strikes ==
In May 2011 KazMunayGas was hit by a strike of workers demanding higher wages and better conditions.

In August 2011, the company was four months into a wildcat strike at Uzenmunaigas. On 2 August, Zhaksylyk Turbaev, a trade union member working for an oilfield service company in Zhanaozen, was killed. On 24 August 2011, the 18-year-old daughter of an elected member of the strike committee was found dead and apparently murdered, according to the striker. Zhansaule Karabalayeva was found in the countryside near the oilfield in Western Kazakhstan with multiple injuries, according to her father, Kurdaibergen Karabalayev, in a telephone interview on 27 August. Bulat Abilov, an opposition politician, said "I don't think this is unconnected to the strike." "The local chief of police, quoted in a local paper, said the killing was not related to the strike. The company spokesman declined comment," according to one report.

On 31 August, Interior Ministry spokesman Nurdilda Oraz said in the Kazakh capital, Nur-Sultan, that the police "did not associate" the "common crime" of Karabalayeva's murder with her father's activities. In the same report, the KMG EP press office said the father was not the trade union chairman and had never been a strike activist but worked as an engine driver for the company until 27 July this year.

Also in August, a labor lawyer, Natalya Sokolova, was sentenced to six years in jail for 'organizing illegal gatherings' at the smaller Karazhanbas field, which was also on strike.

Earlier, in July, the singer Sting had cancelled a concert after he was briefed on the strike by Amnesty International.

These labour strikes were causing a 6% output drop in KazMunayGas production, according to a company spokesman.

On 26 August, KMG EP fired around 900 striking workers and replaced them with new recruits from the area. The company said that production at Uzen had stabilized. Karazhanbasmunai, a joint venture between KMG EP and China's Citic, also fired around 500 workers.

Until mid-September 2011, daily protests by angry protestors, many of whom used to work at Uzen, continued in Zhanaozen's main square "in a rare display of popular dissent".

The unrest has persisted, with violence erupting on independence day, 16 December 2011, killing 16 and leaving about 100 injured as police opened fire on the demonstrations. Army units and armoured personnel carriers were sent in by the Interior Ministry to quell the ensuing protests, which saw government and Uzenmunaigaz buildings set alight by demonstrators.

The labor conflict resulted in the resignation of KazMunaiGas EP Chief Executive Officer Askar Balzhanov on 22 Dec. President Nursultan Nazarbayev also replaced the head of parent company KazMunaiGaz National Co., Bolat Akchulakov, and fired his own son-in-law Timur Kulibayev, who headed the country's sovereign wealth fund.

== See also ==
- Energy policy of Kazakhstan
