= Lajos Wienermann =

Hungarian Hussar (1888–1918)

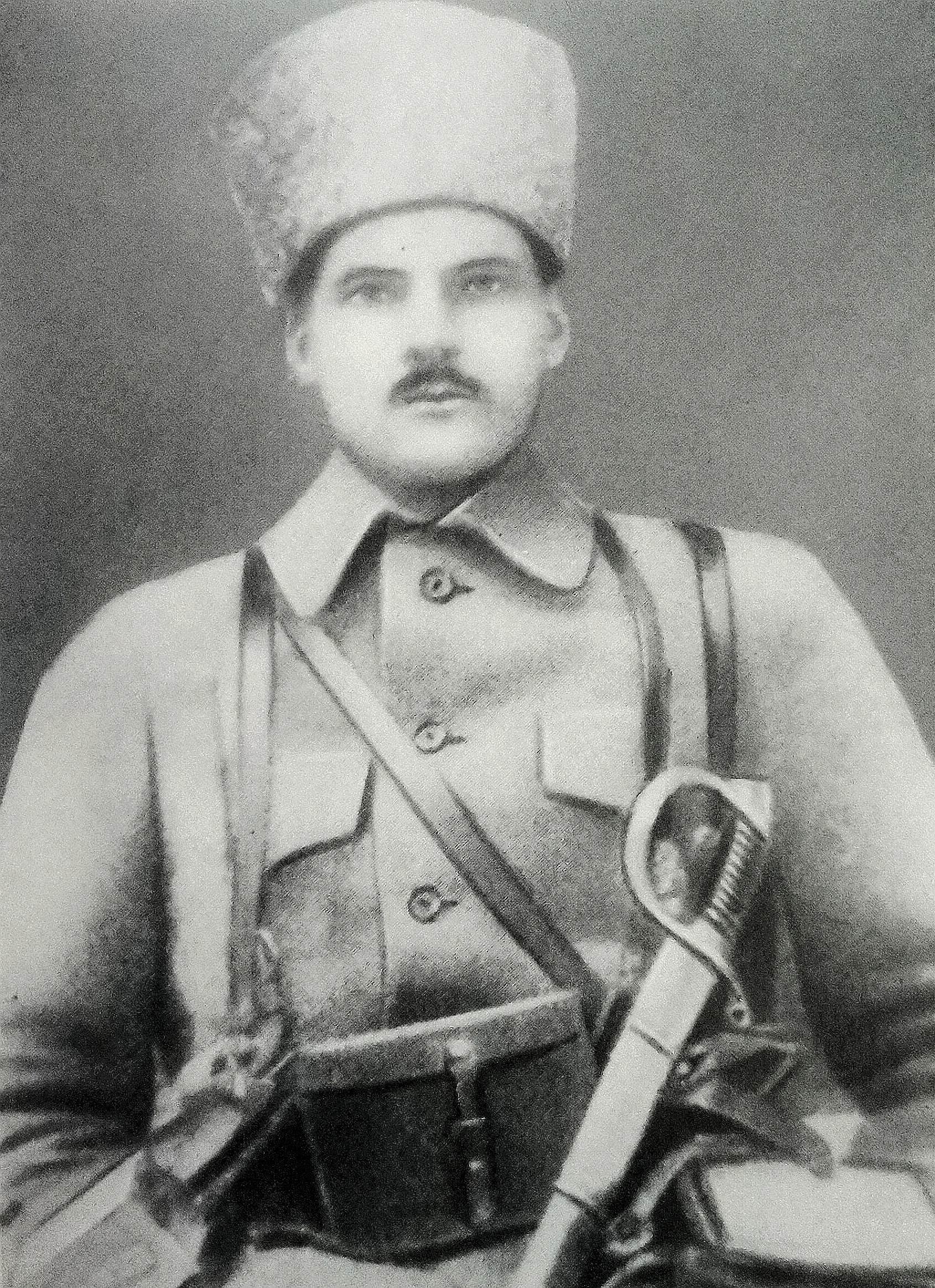
Wienermann in uniform, with a papakha and sabre.

Lajos Jenő Wienermann (western name order, 1888–1918) was a Hungarian Hussar who became a prisoner of war of the Russian Empire, but after the Bolshevik revolution was able to join the Red Army where he formed a battalion of internationalist soldiers, most notable of whom were the 'Hungarian Hussars' who defeated the White cossack army on several occasions.

== Early life ==
Wienermann was born in 1888 in Jászberény in the Kingdom of Hungary. From an early age he helped his stepfather who was a tinsmith. At this age he already had left leaning views because he joined the Social Democratic Party and took part in the trade union movement and right before the war became the secretary of Jászberény's tinsmith union.

== Fighting in the First World War ==
In 1914, Wienermann was drafted a hussar and due to his bravery was eventually promoted to sergeant. Not long after his promotion he was captured and sent to a prisoner of war camp in Tomsk in 1915. There he met important Hungarian socialist prisoners most notable of them being Béla Kun, whom he later became close friends with. In 1917 he attempted to escape back to Hungary but was stopped by German soldiers in Belarus and returned to Russian occupied Minsk. Meanwhile, in the Saratov prisoner of war camp the 1st Saratov International Cavalry Regiment was created, composed of 300 Hungarian Hussars, led by Sándor Kellner. These Hussars did not wear typical Bolshevik uniforms but instead the Hungarian Hussar uniform.

== Joining the Red Army ==
After sending socialist propaganda leaflets to the prisoners in the local camp he created the 1st Minsk International Detachment of the Red Guard composed mostly of Slavic nationalities (Czechs, Slovaks, Serbs, and Croats). This detachment quickly dissolved after the unsuccessful defense of Minsk against German soldiers. Wienermann headed to Moscow.

In Moscow, he again met with Béla Kun where he was introduced to Tibor Szamuely and after an interview Wienermann was granted a Battalion of Hungarians, Germans, Latvians, and Chinese to defend the Kremlin. This Battalion soon grew to around 700 members.

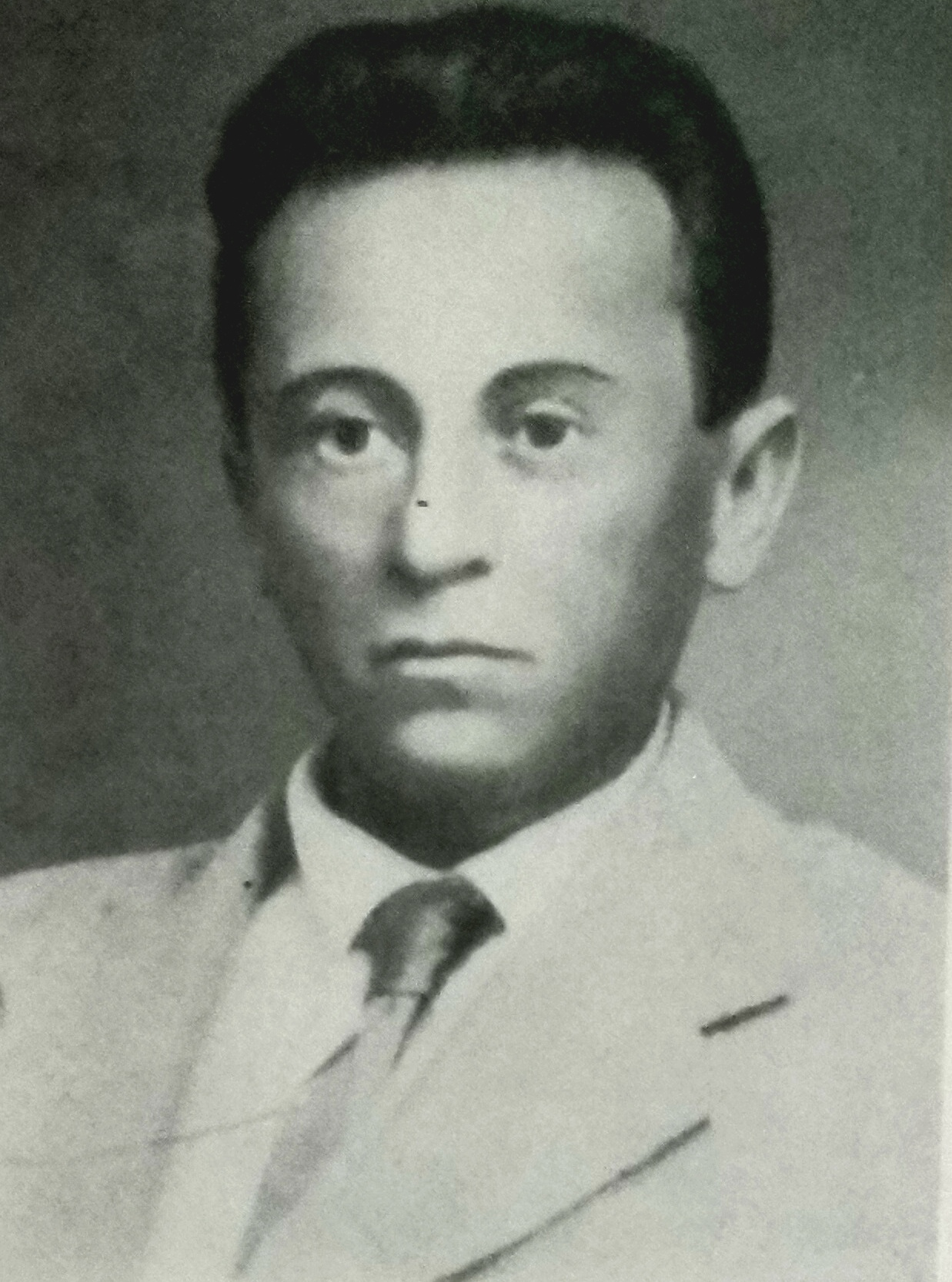
Sándor Kellner, commander of the Hungarian Hussars of the Red Army.

In May 1918 Wienermann and 300 volunteers from his battalion were sent to Astrakhan to help Vasily Chapayev defend the city from the Czechoslovak Legion and White Army. The Red Army usually lacked effective cavalry but this changed when the battalion was joined by the 3 squadrons of Hungarian Hussars led by Sándor Kellner, these hussars were extremely important for the defense of Samara and Astrakhan.

On June 24, 1918, the hussars took part in the recapturing of Novouzensk which had been taken by the White Army on June 17. The Hussars attacked a White Army Battery killing them. It was reported that there was a massacre of Red Army prisoners the night before, killing 160 prisoners. The Hussars attacked a White Army detachment that was transporting Red Army prisoners (presumably to be killed) and defeated them. The Astrakhan and Saratov Hussar regiments were reorganized into a separate Aleksandrov Gay detachment in August 1918.

On August 21, 3000 of Dutov's Cossacks suddenly attacked Novouzensk, while the infantry was inside of the city the Hussars fought on the outskirts. While the Hussars were originally pushed back into the city, the Hungarians used the houses as a defense and forced the Cossacks into a retreat. The Hungarians pursued the Cossacks for around 24 kilometres, with the help of an armored car, during the pursuit alone they cut down and shot around 400 cossacks also capturing their horses.

Until the capturing of Alexandrov Gay, Wienermann spent his time suppressing the uprisings of Kulaks (also known as "wealthy peasants").

On the 21st of September, Wienermann captured Alexandrov Gay with 2 battalions and the help of armored cars. They later received reinforcements, 11 cavalrymen, composed of 7 Hungarians, 2 Germans, 1 Italian and 1 Senegalese. After the capturing of the city, around October, a large detachment of Cossacks on the outskirts of the city took 2 soldiers from Wienermann's detachment as prisoner. After a failed negotiation for the soldiers and a letter from the Cossacks telling Wienermann to surrender in exchange for a large amount of money, Wienermann grabbed a hand-held machine gun, gathered a few Hussars, an armored car and 2 trucks armed with 4 machine guns (16 men in total) went to the village Berezovsky. The Cossacks who knew Wienermann and who had sent the letter expected him to surrender. Wienermann and the commander shaked hands and then the machine guns fired into the crowd, very few Cossacks survived and 15 of them were taken as prisoner. By the time Wienermann arrived, the prisoners he tried to save were already executed. One of the prisoners killed was the brother of the Hussar Ferenc Muller. Muller chased after the retreating Cossacks and killed a few before eventually detaching far away from the other soldiers and was presumably killed. After the battle many resources were captured, mostly guns, sabres and horses, but among them was an American produced motorcycle, Wienermann took the motorcycle for himself. On the motorcycle he carried a sabre, hand-held machine gun and a few grenades and he would conduct many raids with it, in battles switching between horse and motorcycle.

Meanwhile, around September 28 Wienermann sent Hussar scouts and half a squadron to the International Regiment of the 1st Samara Division at Chapayev's request. The regiment forced the Komuch army to retreat from Syzran, nearly encircling them. On the 1st of October the regiment defeated 2 columns of Komuch and Czechoslovak soldiers, before trying to help the rebelling workers in Ivashchenkovo. The regiment failed to reach Ivashchenkovo and many civilians were massacred by the White Army.

Samara was completely occupied by the Red Army by October 7. The Red Commanders tried to organise the occupation of Buguruslan, Ufa, and Sterlitamak but the failed to take into account revolting soldiers and the overwhelming advantage the White Army Cossacks had.

On October 12, 1918 The Red Army would attack Uralsk and Iletsk. The main attack on Uralsk was carried out by Chapayev's group and their right flank was held by Wienermann's Battalion, composed of 500 infantrymen, 250 cavalrymen, 15 machine guns and 4 artillery.

On October 13, White forces commanded by Colonel Borodin had been secretly following Wienermann. Near Kirgizskaya Talovka Colonel Borodin ordered roughly 100 cossacks to fire at Wienermanns detachment, though the Hussars quickly forced the Cossacks into a retreat. Later that day, Wienerman occupied Kirgizskaya Talovka. Wienermann was too far from his allies to be saved in case of an emergency, knowing this Borodin with reinforcements attacked the village early in the morning, from the North and East. Wienermann and his soldiers were alert. He commanded his infantry to engage the Cossacks, while Wienermann withdrew his hussars behind the village. Gorodin believing that all Red Soldiers were already engaged, attacked the village with his entire detachment of Cossacks, Wienermann switched from motorcycle to horse and ambushed the Cossacks, the Cossacks retreated and the Hussars chased after them. The Cossacks led the Hussars to the main force of the 9th Cossack regiment. The Cossack Regiment surrounded the Hussars with pikes. Wienermann and his Hussars fired at them close range with revolvers and Mausers, creating gaps in which the Hussars could engage the Cossacks with sabres. The Cossacks were forced to once again retreat and Wienermanns detachment was forced to retreat back to the village after being shot at by artillery.

=== Death in 1918 ===
Wienermann grabbed his machine gun, got on his motorcycle to save the prisoners recently captured by the White Cossacks with the help of 15 Hussars and Sergeant Gerbe. The Cossacks were resting in a valley, Wienermann and his detachment threw grenades into the valley, ambushing the Cossacks. The freed Hungarian prisoners were put on horses, though they lagged behind. Seeing this Wienermann moved behind them to hold off the Cossacks, this would be the cause of his death as his machine gun jammed and he was cut down by Cossacks.

His body was eventually recovered by Gerbe. The Cossacks faced severe losses and would not attack for a while, this gave Gerbe the chance to bring in reinforcements. Gerbe became commander and the battalion would go on to fight for the Red Army.

Wienermann's funeral was held in Moscow, which Kun Béla also attended. His obituary and death was published in many newspapers. At this funeral Kun Béla vowed that Wienermann's dream of a Soviet Hungary would come true.
