= Malai Gas Field =

Natural gas field located

Malai Field
- Country: Turkmenistan
- Region: Lebap Province
- Offshore/onshore: Onshore
- Operator: Türkmengaz

Malai is a natural gas field located in Lebap Province of Turkmenistan, on the left bank of Amu Darya River. It has been developed since the 1970s.

The field is currently operated by Türkmengaz. Production from Malai field contributes to the overall volume of gas transported via Turkmenistan-China gas pipeline.

== See also ==
- Saman-Depe Gas Field
- Bagtyýarlyk
- Central Asia – China gas pipeline
- Ýolöten Gas Field
- Dauletabad gas field
