= East–West pipeline (Turkmenistan) =

Natural gas pipeline in Turkmenistan

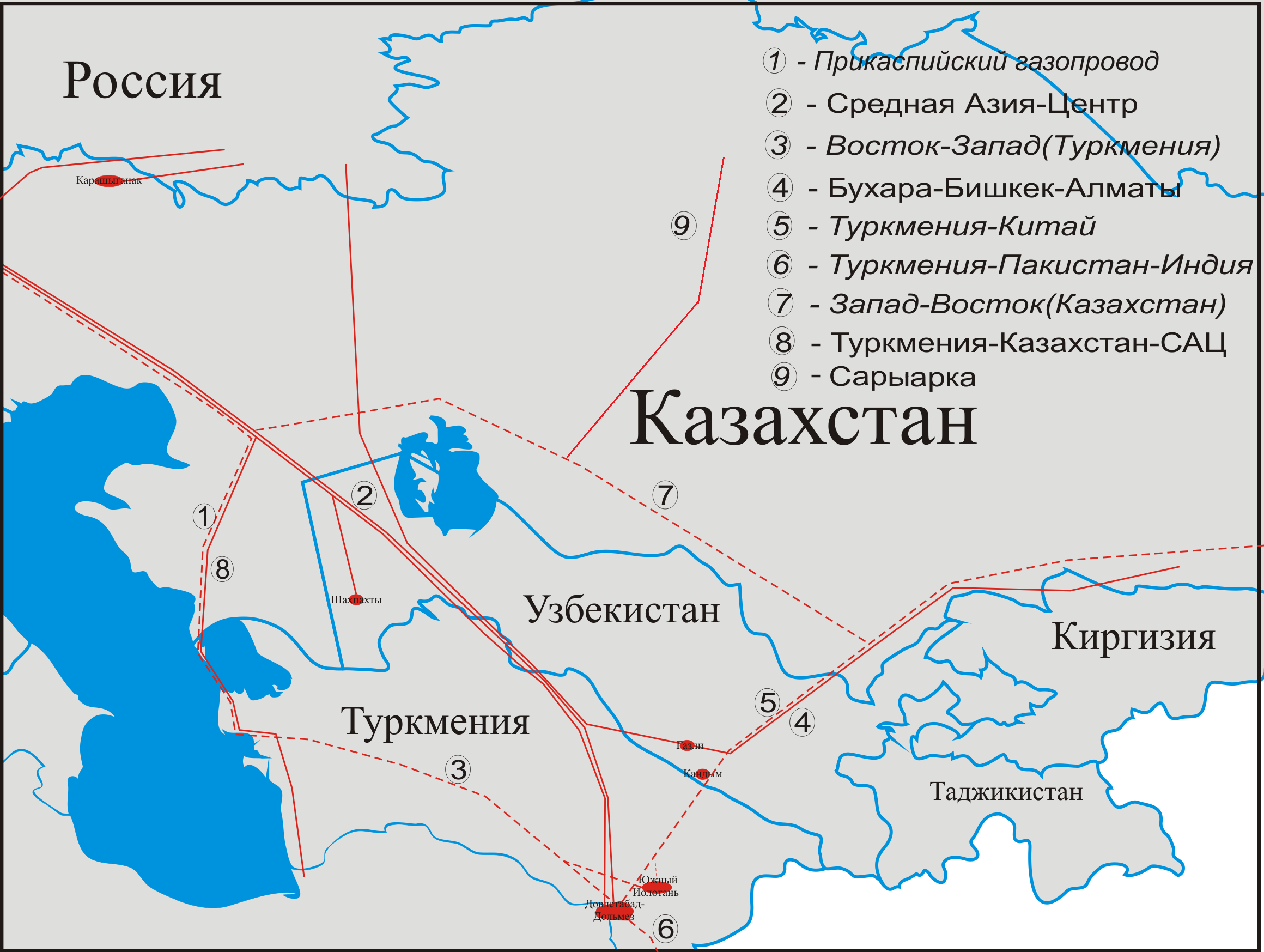
- Location of East–West pipeline

Location
- Country: Turkmenistan
- Direction: east–west
- Start: Şatlyk compressor station
- To: Belek-1 compressor station

General information
- Type: natural gas
- Operator: Türkmengaz
- Contractors: Türkmennebitgazgurlushyk
- Construction started: 2010
- Commissioned: 2015

Technical information
- Length: 773 km (480 mi)
- Maximum discharge: 30 billion cubic metres per annum (1.1 trillion cubic feet per annum)
- Diameter: 1,420 mm (56 in)
- No. of compressor stations: 8

The East–West pipeline is a natural gas pipeline in Turkmenistan. It was constructed to carry natural gas from gas fields in eastern Turkmenistan to the coast of Caspian Sea across the southern part of the country.

== History ==
In 2007–2008, Russia and Turkmenistan negotiated construction of the East–West pipeline to supply the planned Caspian Coastal pipeline, an extension of the Central Asia–Center gas pipeline system. The pipeline was to be built in cooperation with the Russian gas company Gazprom. The main designated contractor was Zarubezhneftegaz, a subsidiary of Gazprom. However, on 27 March 2009 after tensions between Russia and Turkmenistan over gas supplies from Turkmenistan to Russia, Turkmenistan launched an international tender for the pipeline. Over 70 companies expressed their interest to participate in the project. In May 2010 it was announced that Turkmenistan will build the pipeline on its own. Construction started in 2012 and was completed in December 2015.

== Route ==
The pipeline starts from the Şatlyk compressor station at the eastern branch of the Central Asia–Center gas pipeline in Mary Province and runs to the Belek-1 compressor station at the western branch of the Central Asia–Center gas pipeline in Balkan Province. From there, gas could be transported to Russia or, when constructed, through the Trans-Caspian Gas Pipeline to Azerbaijan and further to Europe. In addition to export, the pipeline will supply the central and Caspian region of Turkmenistan. The pipeline largely follows the route of existing pipelines. It creates a system connecting all the major gas fields of Turkmenistan.

== Description ==
The pipeline is intended to be mainly supplied from the Galkynysh, Dauletabad, Yashlar, and Minara gas fields. Length of the pipeline is 773 kilometres (480 mi) with a capacity of 30 billion cubic metres (1.1 trillion cubic feet) of natural gas per year, delivered by eight compressor stations. The pipeline was built by Türkmennebitgazgurlushyk and is owned and operated by Türkmengaz. Design diameter of the pipeline is 1,420 millimeters.

== See also ==
- Central Asia – China gas pipeline
- Dauletabad–Sarakhs–Khangiran pipeline
- Korpezhe–Kurt Kui pipeline
- Nabucco pipeline
