= Pipelines in Turkmenistan =

Natural gas and petroleum are exported from Turkmenistan by means of a number of existing or proposed pipelines.

== Natural gas pipelines ==
- Central Asia–Center gas pipeline system
- Central Asia–China gas pipeline
- Dauletabad–Sarakhs–Khangiran pipeline
- East–West pipeline
- Korpeje–Kordkuy pipeline
- Trans-Afghanistan Pipeline
- Trans-Caspian Gas Pipeline

== Oil pipeline ==
- Afghanistan Oil Pipeline

== See also ==
- Transport in Turkmenistan
