= Aqqyztoghay =

Aqqyztoghay Аққйзтоғай اققيزتوعاي
- Aqqyztoghay
- Location within Kazakhstan
- Coordinates: 47°05′55″N 54°23′20″E
- Country: Kazakhstan
- Region: Atyrau
- District: Zhylyoi District
- Rural District: Akkiiztogay
- Elevation: −4 m (−13 ft)

Population (2021)
  - Total: 1,454
- Time zone: UTC+5 (West Kazakhstan Time)
  - Summer (DST): UTC+5 (West Kazakhstan Time)
- Postal code: 060104
- Area code: +7 71237

Aqqyztoghay, also known as Akkiztogay, (Kazakh: Аққйзтоғай, Aqqiztoğai, اققيزتوعاي) is a town in the Zhylyoi District of the Atyrau Region in southwest Kazakhstan. It lies at an altitude of 4 m (13 ft) below sea level, and sits on the southern bank of the Emba River. It is approximately 28km northeast of the town of Kulsary.

== Population ==
Aqqyztoghay:

Year	Population
1989	1210
1999	1379
2009	2232
2021	1454

== Infrastructure ==
A rural outpatient clinic was constructed in 2007. A kindergarten with a capacity of 160 students was established in 2016, having been something that the community had needed for many years. The town is additionally serviced by a mosque and two schools.

Most other facilities, including markets and a train station, are in Kulsary. The only connection between the two settlements is by a road, which is at times in poor condition due to frequent use by heavy trucks, and a lack of maintenance and repairs.

The school in Aqqyztoghay.

== History and Archaeology ==
There are several historical sites in the area surrounding Aqqyztoghay, including burial mounds and the Akmochet Necropolis. In 1998, a new mosque was built at Akmochet on the site of an old mosque, which was white in color due to the use of limestone as a primary building material.

In 1974, an obelisk was built in Aqqyztoghay to commemorate Baizhan Atagozhiev (1895-1944), a soldier who fought in WWII.

== Natural Resources ==
Aqqyztoghay has fertile land, although an unreliable water supply can make for poor growing conditions. The greater Atyrau region is rich in oil and gas.

== Climate ==
A Khazydromet (Kazakhstan's national hydrometeorological service) monitoring post in Aqqyztoghay collects data regarding the water levels of the Emba, information that can be used to calculate flood risks.

Atyrau has a semi-arid climate with hot dry summers cold winters, with year-round temperatures typically falling between -10°C and 33°C.
