= Algemba =

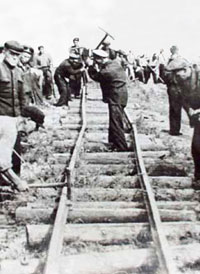
Work proceeding on the Algemba project

Algemba was a railway and oil pipeline project inaugurated by the Bolsheviks in 1919. It was reviewed in 1921.

The name was created from Al(exandrov) G(ay), a village in the largely rural Novouzensky Uyezd (now in Alexandrovo-Gaysky District) and Emba, a river in Kazakhstan.

Following the capture of the Emba oil fields by Mikhail Frunze in December 1919, the Red Army had seized a significant amount of oil, but lacked any means to transport it to the centre of Russia. Thus on 24 December it was decided to extend the railway line which went as far as Alexandrov Gay a further 500 miles to reach the Emba river. The task was not easy as it involved traversing empty saline steppe which did not have any habitation or even drinking water for the workforce. Despite his protests, this task was assigned to Frunze. He conscripted about 45,000 local people in Saratov and Samara, who were engaged in constructing a raised bank along which the railway was proposed to run. Despite problems with an outbreak of typhus amongst the workforce, it was decided in March 1920 to construct a pipeline alongside the railway. However as they had no suitable pipe material to construct the pipeline, little progress was made. The Bolshevik decision makers had little experience in pipelines, so when they made the suggestion that wooden pipes be used, experts informed them that not only was there no suitable forest to provide the timber, but also wooden pipes would not be able to take the necessary pressure. Even in April 1920, following the Bolshevik conquest of Baku and Grozny, the Bolsheviks still insisted on building the project

With hundreds of people dying every day, Lenin wanted to know who was responsible for the "sabotage", but the reality was that poor food inadequate shelter and disease were the source of the problems. However a billion rubles in cash had been allocated to the project and there is no record of what became of this money. By late 1920 hundreds were dying every day and in early 1921 there was a cholera outbreak.

On 19 April 1921 the Council of Labour and Defence set up a commission to review the project. Leonid Ramzin, a professor at the Bauman Moscow State Technical University was part of this commission. At a subsequent meeting held on 29 April 1921 it was decided to suspend construction of the pipeline for logistical reasons. The railway line had been assigned for an accelerated pace of construction, but on 6 May 1921 this was reverted to ordinary pace.

It is estimated 35,000 people lost their lives on this project.
