= Avgustovka =

Avgustovka may refer to:

- Avgustovka, Kaliningrad Oblast
- Avgustovka, Samara Oblast
- Avgustovka, Saratov Oblast
