= Ushkan Caravanserai =

- Interactive map of Ushkan Caravanserai
- 46°35.095′N 54°30.604′E
- Location: Atyrau Region, Zhylyoi District, Kazakhstan

The Ushkan Caravanserai is a medieval archaeological monument in Kazakhstan.

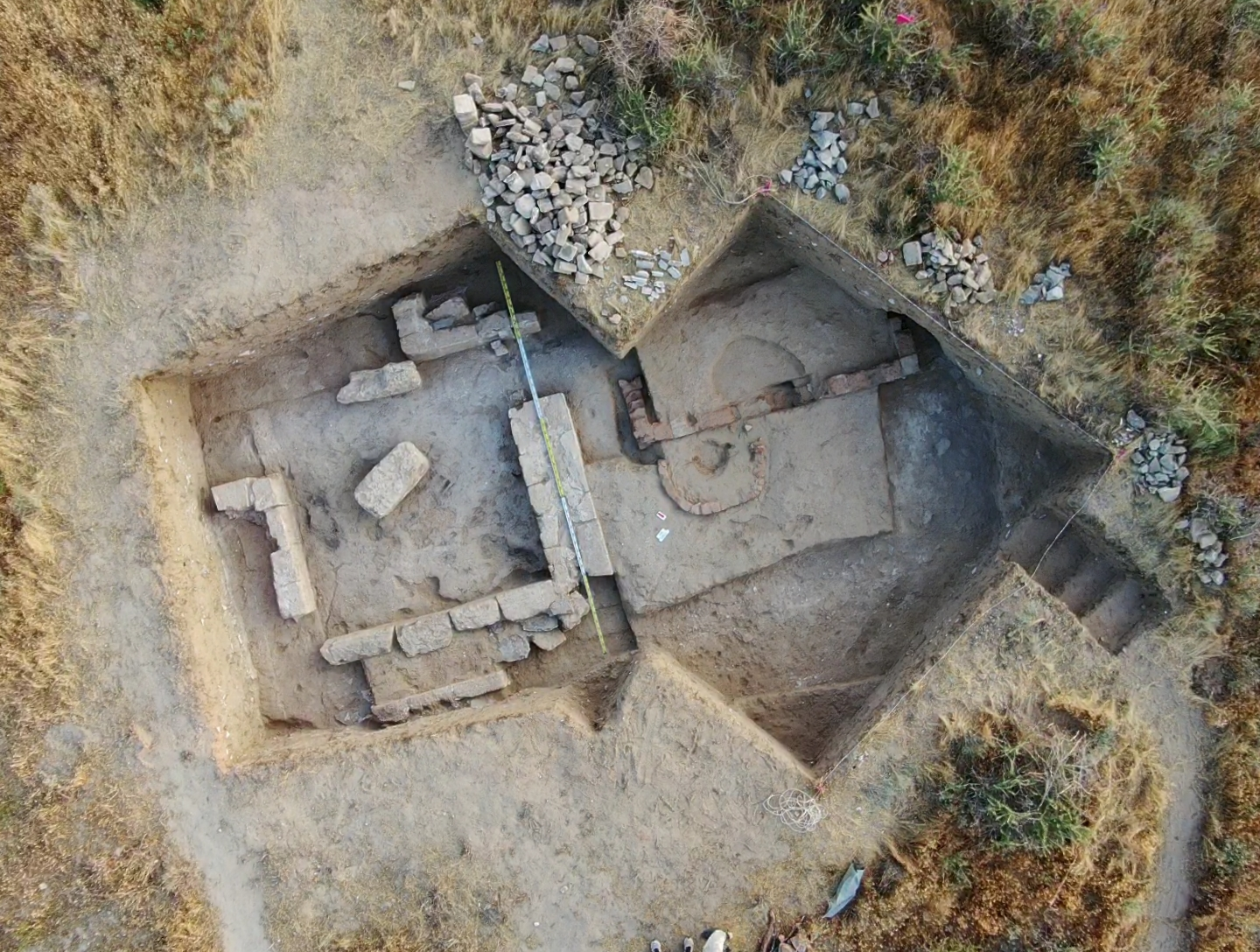
Ushkan Caravanserai

== Location ==
The Ushkan Caravanserai is located in the Atyrau Region, Zhylyoi District, approximately 50 km southeast of the city of Kulsary. GPS coordinates: N 46° 35.095′; E 54° 30.604′.

== Archaeological Research ==
The monument was constructed along a caravan trade route connecting the countries of the West and the East. Currently, the Ushkan-ata Necropolis is situated on the ruins of the caravanserai. The necropolis contains preserved architectural monuments from the 19th–20th centuries: tombstones carved by master stonecutters, koshkartas (tombstones in the shape of rams), mausoleums, and saganatams constructed from shell stone blocks, among other structures. The Ushkan-ata Necropolis is officially included in the State Register of Monuments of History and Culture of Local Significance for Atyrau Region and has a legally established protection zone.

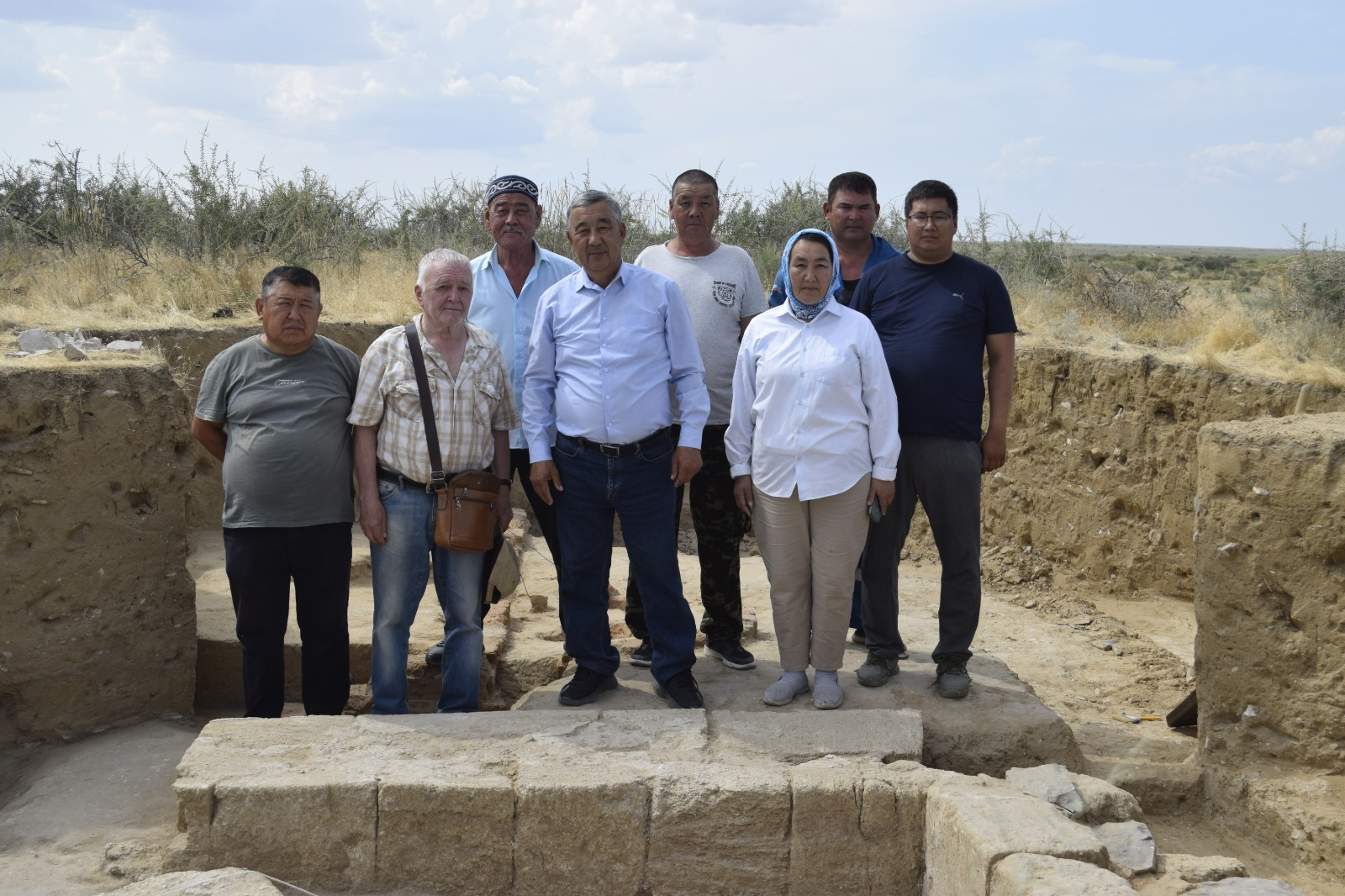
Archaeologists from the "Saraishyq" Museum-Reserve during an expedition to the Ushkan settlement, 2025

The Russian scholar F. K. Brun identified the city of Trestago, marked on the 1367 map by the Pizzigano brothers, with the ruins of Ushkan. Archaeologists A. Kh. Margulan and S. P. Tolstov also classified Ushkan as a caravanserai.

In 2025, an archaeological expedition from the "Saraishyq" Museum-Reserve, conducting excavations at the Ushkan site, uncovered part of a building structure erected from shell stone blocks. Studying the exposed construction led archaeologists to conclude it was part of a caravanserai. The absence of traces of residential dwellings on the monument's territory suggested this was not a city but specifically a caravanserai.

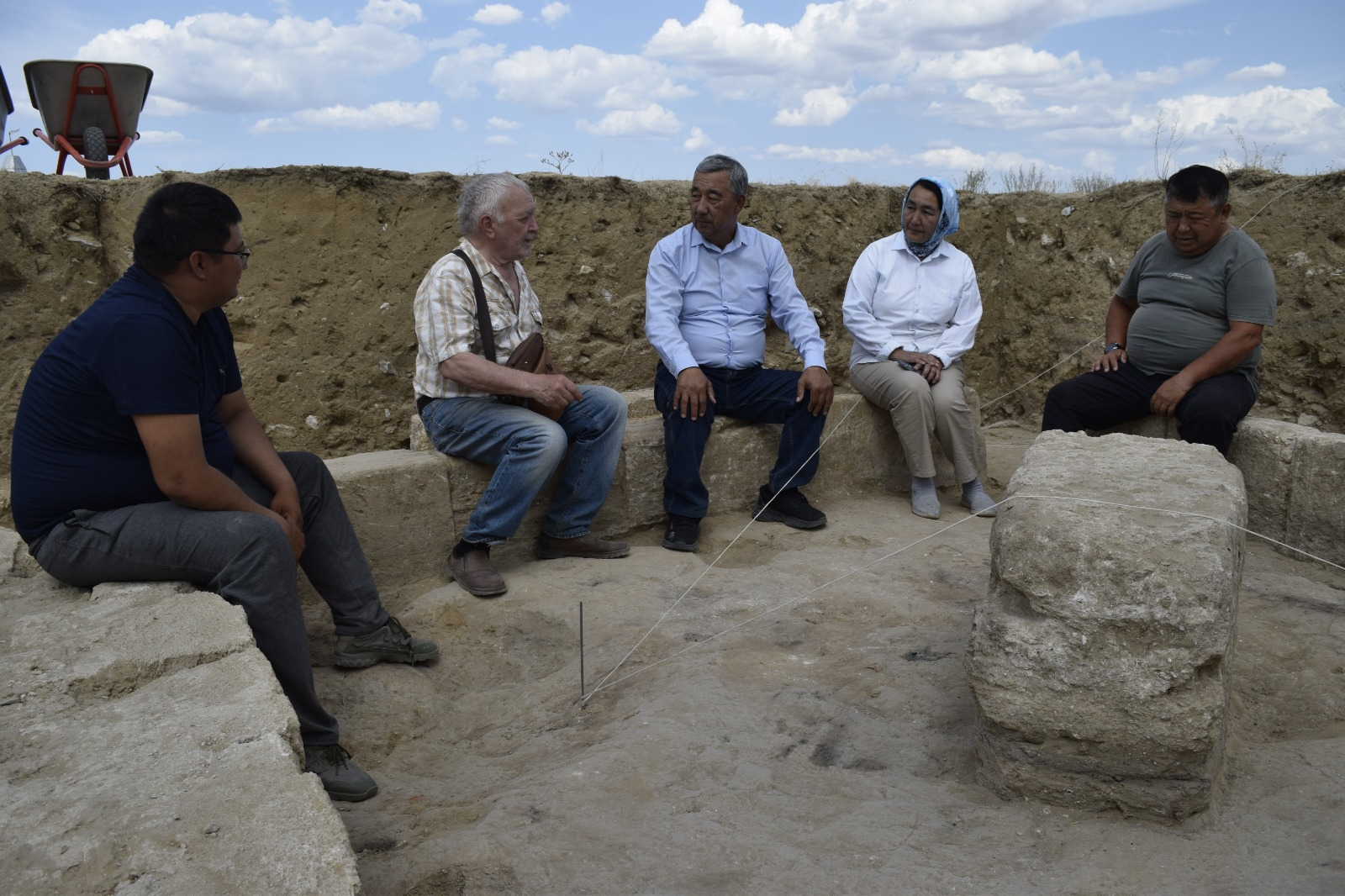
From left to right: archaeologist A. Zhumabayev, numismatist V. Plakhov, Doctor of Historical Sciences A. Muktar, Doctor of Historical Sciences U. Tulegenova, expedition leader, archaeologist A. Turaruly. Ushkan, 2025

During the research, a silver coin – a dirham – and a significant number of copper coins – puls – were discovered. The dirham was minted in the city of Moksha during the reign of Uzbek Khan, approximately in the 1320s–1330s. Among the puls were coins of Uzbek Khan minted in Khorezm, coins of Janibek Khan minted in Saray al-Jadid, and coins of Mürid Khan issued in Saraishyq.

== Sources ==
- Golden Horde Monuments of Saraishyq, Ushkan, Ashysay, and Qaragaily in the Context of Historical and Cultural Heritage (13th–15th Centuries)
- Ushkan Ata Necropolis
- An expedition was organized at the site of the medieval city of Ushkan
- Works carried out at the Ushkan settlement (based on the results of the archaeological survey conducted in 2021)
