= Ashyrguly Begliyev =

Turkmen politician

- Aşyrguly Begliýew

Counselor to the President for Oil and Gas
- Incumbent
- Assumed office 13 May 2023

Deputy Prime Minister for Oil and Gas
- In office 10 February 2023 – 13 May 2023
- President: Serdar Berdimuhamedow

Counselor to the President for Oil and Gas
- In office 8 April 2022 – 10 February 2023

Personal details
- Born: 1957 (age 68–69) Bagyr village, Turkmen SSR, USSR (now part of Ashgabat, Turkmenistan)
- Education: Turkmen Polytechnic Institute
- Occupation: Politician

Ashyrguly Begliyev (Turkmen: Aşyrguly Begliýew) is a political figure and hydrocarbon geologist in Turkmenistan, formerly deputy prime minister for oil and gas, and as of 13 May 2023 counselor for oil and gas of the president of Turkmenistan.

== Biography ==
According to official state media, Begliyev was born in 1957 in what is now the Bagyr neighborhood of Ashgabat (at the time a separate village). In 1979 he graduated from the Ashgabat Polytechnic Institute as a mining engineer and geophysicist. From 1979 to 1985 he worked as a geophysical technician for an experimental expedition in Turkmenistan. From 1985 to 1988 he was a geophysicist with the Turkmen Scientific-Research Geological Exploration Institute.

Between 1988 and 1994 he held various positions as a geologist in the Karakum Exploratory Drilling Administration in Baherden District. In 1994 he was appointed chief of the Geologic-Thematic Group of the Industrial-Geophysical Works Administration of the Ministry of Oil and Gas. In 1995 he was moved to the position of chief specialist in the Division of Geophysics of the Ministry of Oil and Gas Industry and Mineral Resources. From 1999 to 2005 he was head of the Committee on Hydrocarbon Resource Use of the President of Turkmenistan and chairman of the management committee of the Hazar contract region. In 2006 he was appointed deputy chief of the Administration for Foreign Economic Relations of the Ministry of Oil and Gas Industry and Mineral Resources, and chief of the Division of Implementation of Marketing, Supply, and Tendering Documentation and Registration of Agreements of the Administration of Marketing and Foreign Economic Relations. From 2007 to 2010 he headed the Nebitdag Division of the State Agency for Management and Use of Oil and Gas Resources. From 2010 to 2015 Begliyev was deputy director of that state agency, and in 2015 was appointed chairman of Turkmengas state corporation. In 2017 he was removed from that position, ostensibly to change jobs, but according to opposition media, Begliyev lost that position due to his "lack of initiative and his inability to understand his subordinates."

Effective 13 January 2017 and until 14 December 2017 Begliyev headed the Cabinet of Ministers Division for Control of Construction of Especially Important and Capital Objects of the Oil and Gas Sector. From then until 2020, he was a senior scientific researcher assigned to study the Galkynysh gas field at the Scientific-Research Institute of Natural Gas. On 1 July 2020 he was appointed head of the Production Sharing Agreements Division of Türkmen Milli Nebitgaz Kompaniýasy. As of 8 April 2022, he was concurrently appointed adviser to the president for oil and gas issues.

On 10 February 2023, Begliyev was appointed deputy chairman of the Cabinet of Ministers for oil and gas. He was relieved of that position and appointed counselor to the president for oil and gas on 13 May 2023.

== Awards ==
- Honorary title “Türkmenistanyň at gazanan senagat işgäri” ("Honored Industrial Worker of Turkmenistan")
- “Watana bolan söýgüsi üçin” ("For Love of the Motherland") medal
- “Garaşsyz, Baky Bitarap Türkmenistan” ("Independent, Eternally Neutral Turkmenistan") medal
- “Türkmenistanyň Garaşsyzlygynyň 25 ýyllygyna” ("25 Years of Turkmenistan's Independence") jubilee medal

Preceded by Shahym Abdrahmanov	Deputy Prime Minister for Oil and Gas; 2021–2023	Succeeded by Batyr Amanov
