= Turkmenistan–Iran pipeline =

Turkmenistan–Iran pipeline may refer to:

- Korpeje–Kordkuy pipeline
- Dauletabad–Salyp Yar pipeline
