= Nikolai Dvortsov =

- Born: Nikolay Dvortsov; 1917; Kurilovka, Russia
- Died: 1985 (aged 67–68); Altai Krai, Russia
- Occupation: Writer
- Writing career
- Genre: socialist realism

Nikolai Grigoryevich Dvortsov (Russian: Николай Григорьевич Дворцо́в, 6 December 1917 - 25 January 1985) was a Soviet writer and a member of the Union of Soviet Writers since 1955.

Dvortsov was born in Kurilovka (now in Novouzensky District, Russia). During World War II he was drafted into the Red Army and participated in the Anglo-Soviet invasion of Iran in 1941. In May 1942, he participated in the operation to liberate Kharkov, where he was captured, and sent to a labor camp in Bergen, Norway. He organized a resistance group in the camp, with connection with Norwegian communists. Six members of the group were killed by Nazis in 1944.

After the war, Dvortsov lived in the Altai. He worked as the head of the operational department of the regional savings banks management committee, as well as a reporter for the Stalinovskaya Smena newspaper. In his free time he engaged in literary work. His best known work was the novel More b'etsa o skaly (Waves dash against the rocks; 1961) about his time as a prisoner of war.
