= Alexandrovo-Gaysky District =

Alexandrovo-Gaysky District Александрово-Гайский район (Russian)
- District
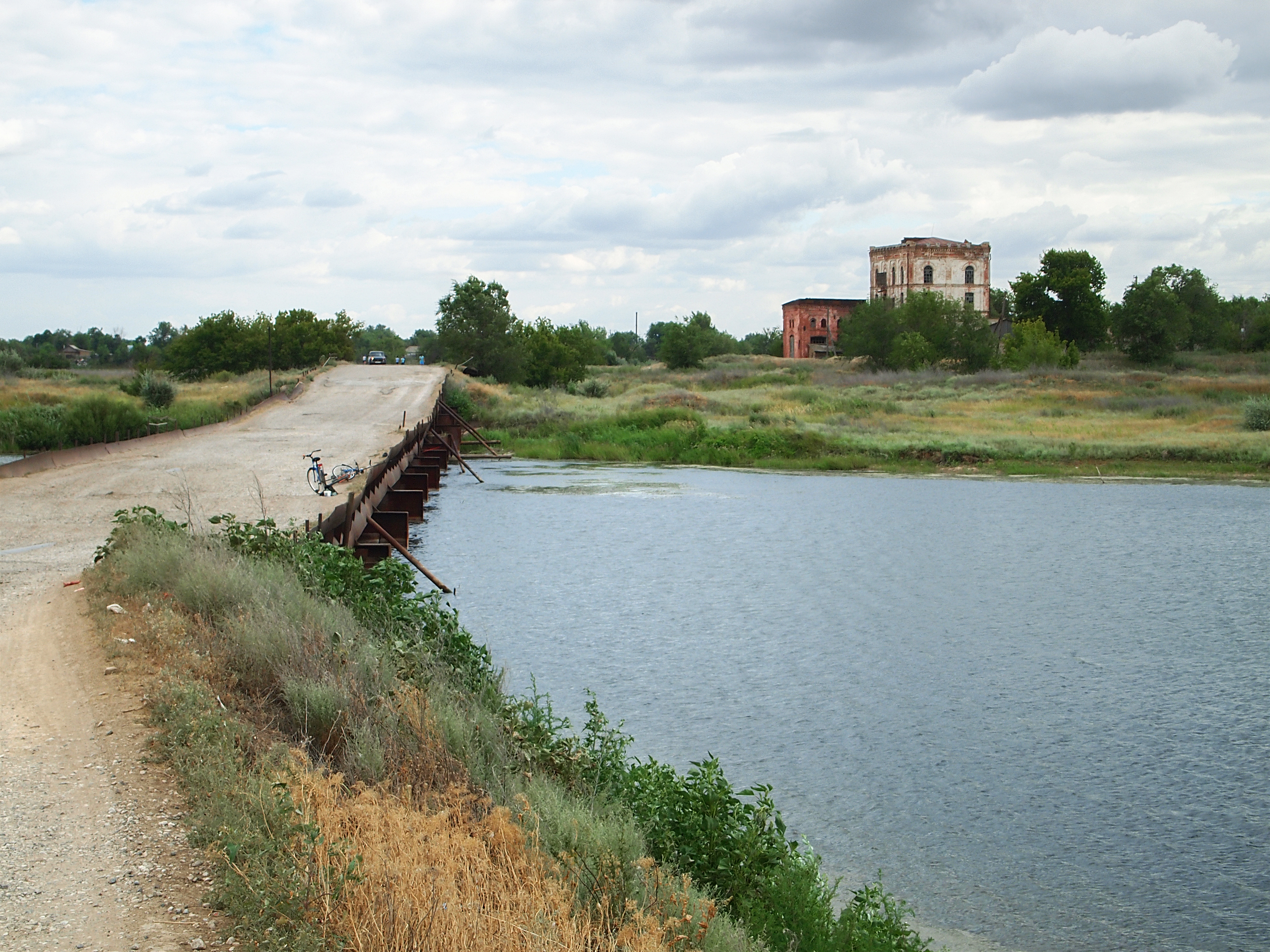
- Historic mill in Alexandrovo-Gaysky District

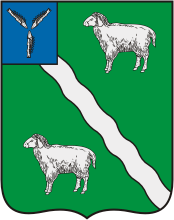
- Coat of arms
- Location of Alexandrovo-Gaysky District in Saratov Oblast
- Coordinates: 50°08′N 48°33′E
- Country: Russia
- Federal subject: Saratov Oblast
- Established: January 1935
- Administrative center: Alexandrov Gay

Area
  - Total: 2,700 km^{2} (1,000 sq mi)

Population (2010 Census)
  - Total: 16,855
  - Density: 6.2/km^{2} (16/sq mi)
  - Urban: 0%
  - Rural: 100%

Administrative structure
  - Inhabited localities: 58 rural localities

Municipal structure
  - Municipally incorporated as: Alexandrovo-Gaysky Municipal District
  - Municipal divisions: 0 urban settlements, 7 rural settlements
- Time zone: UTC+4 (MSK+1)
- OKTMO ID: 63602000
- Website: http://algay.sarmo.ru/

Alexandrovo-Gaysky District (Russian: Алекса́ндрово-Га́йский райо́н) is an administrative and municipal district (raion), one of the thirty-eight in Saratov Oblast, Russia. It lies in the semi-desert zone at the extreme southeast of the oblast, on the border with Kazakhstan. It borders Novouzensky District in the north and the Kaztalovsky District of the West Kazakhstan Region of Kazakhstan in the south and southeast. The area of the district is 2,700 square kilometers (1,000 sq mi). Its administrative center is the rural locality (a selo) of Alexandrov Gay. Population: 16,855 (2010 Census); 17,763 (2002 census); 17,003 (1989 Soviet census). The population of Alexandrov Gay accounts for 57.7% of the district's total population.

== Geography ==
The district occupies the extreme southeastern corner of Saratov Oblast, in a zone of arid steppe and semi-desert near the Russo-Kazakh frontier. Its boundary measures 254 km, of which 165 km form the international border with Kazakhstan; the district extends about 74 km from north to south and 48 km from east to west. The principal watercourses are the Bolshoy Uzen and Maly Uzen rivers, the former flowing through the administrative center. The territory is low-lying and dry, with most natural water sources being heavily mineralized, so that supplying potable water has long been a problem; in December 1996 the district was officially designated an arid and waterless area with difficult living conditions. Volga water was first brought to the district through irrigation works in 1972.

== History ==
Archaeological investigation of the district, carried out mainly in the last quarter of the 20th century, revealed early settlement along the Bolshoy Uzen. The site of Oroshayemoye, excavated near Alexandrov Gay in 1983–1984, dates to the Eneolithic "Caspian" culture of around 6,000–7,000 years ago; later excavations uncovered a still older Neolithic layer assigned to the Orlovka culture.

The settlement of Alexandrov Gay was founded in 1694 by peasant migrants and took its name from one of its first settlers, combined with gai, an archaic Russian word for the floodplain woods along the river. Old Believers began arriving after a decree of Catherine the Great in 1762. In late August 1774 Yemelyan Pugachev, retreating with the remnants of his army, was seized by his own followers while encamped near Alexandrov Gay and handed over to the authorities. By the mid-19th century the chief occupation of the inhabitants was grain farming, and the locality became known for a prized wheat variety, the "Beloturka." A railway branch and station, linking the settlement toward Urbakh, were opened in 1895.

Soviet power was proclaimed in January 1918, and the following May the area became a focus of the Russian Civil War when Cossack forces attacked from three directions and captured the settlement. Over roughly four months of fighting some 700 Red Guards and communists were killed. In February 1919 Dmitry Furmanov arrived as commissar of the Alexandrovo-Gaysky brigade, soon reorganized into the 25th Division, whose commander Vasily Chapaev led an offensive from the area that spring. In 1920 the district saw construction of the ill-fated Algemba railway-and-pipeline project.

Alexandrovo-Gaysky District was created in January 1935 out of Novouzensky District, within Saratov Krai (from 1936, Saratov Oblast). It was abolished in 1960 and merged into Novouzensky District, then restored on 13 April 1973. In 1967 the district received the oblast's first gas-compressor station, a link in a major gas-transport system, after which Alexandrov Gay grew with an influx of gas-industry workers and was reclassified as an urban-type settlement. During the Great Patriotic War some 3,480 residents were called up, of whom about 1,595 did not return.

== Administrative and municipal status ==
Within the framework of administrative divisions, Alexandrovo-Gaysky District is one of the thirty-eight districts of Saratov Oblast. The selo of Alexandrov Gay serves as its administrative center. The district comprises 58 rural localities.

As a municipal division, the district is incorporated as Alexandrovo-Gaysky Municipal District. It is divided into seven rural settlements and contains no urban settlements.

== Demographics ==
The population was 16,855 at the 2010 Census, of which Alexandrov Gay accounted for 57.7%. The district's population is composed chiefly of Kazakhs (46.6%) and Russians (45.3%). Kazakhs form the majority in nearly all of the district's settlements; the exceptions are the administrative center, its southern suburb of Novoaleksandrovka, and the small farmsteads of Kruglyakov and Yashin, with the district's Russian population concentrated heavily in and around the center. Religious life is served by an Orthodox church and a mosque in Alexandrov Gay.

== Economy ==
The district's economy is predominantly agricultural, based on livestock raising—chiefly sheep and cattle—and grain growing. Some 88 peasant (farm) holdings and agricultural cooperatives operate in the district, among them the breeding farms SPK Novouzensky, SHPK Sysoyevsky, and OOO Veles, alongside slaughtering facilities, a small flour mill, and bakeries. The principal industrial enterprise is a gas-compressor station, a facility of the Gazprom transgaz Saratov subsidiary located on the Central Asia–Center gas pipeline system and described by regional authorities as the largest in Europe. A grain elevator has operated in the district since the Soviet period.
