= Saman-Depe Gas Field =

Natural gas field in Lebap Province of Turkmenistan

- Location within Turkmenistan
- Country: Turkmenistan
- Region: Lebap Province
- Offshore/onshore: Onshore
- Operator: CNPC International
- Partners: Türkmengaz; CNPC International

Field history
- Discovery: 1980s
- Peak year: 2015–2020

Production
- Estimated gas in place: 80×10^{9} m^{3} (2.8×10^{12} cu ft)

Saman-Depe Gas Field is a large natural gas field located in Lebap Province of Turkmenistan. The field belongs to contractual territory Bagtyyarlyk, a group of several fields on the right bank of Amu Darya River the maximum output of which is estimated at 25-30 billion cubic meters per year, combined. The peak of production is expected in 2015–2020. As per initial estimates, the fields will produce approximately 12 billion cubic meters in 2010. Saman-Depe along with Altyn-Asyr are considered to be the largest fields in the area. Contract area of Bagtyyarlyk is estimated at 1.7 trillion cubic metres (60 trillion cubic feet), however the precise data is yet to be confirmed. In total, there are 17 gas and gas condensate fields on the right bank of Amu Darya:

- Saman-Depe, Farap (both in development stage);
- Metedzhan, Kishtivan, Sandykty (all three being preserved),
- Akgumalam, Tangiguyi, Ildzhik, Yanguyi, Chashguyi, Girsan, Beshir, Bota, Uzyngyi, Bereketli, Pirgyi (all in exploration stage)

Saman-Depe is proven to be the largest among 17 fields so far, with reserves equal to 80 billion cubic metres (2.8 trillion cubic feet). The first well No. 53/1 at a depth of 2,533 metres (8,310 ft) was drilled by subcontractor Sichuan Petroleum. CNPC will also be repairing nearly 50 wells prepared by Turkmen specialists in 1980's. In December 2009, Presidents of Turkmenistan, China, Uzbekistan and Kazakhstan inaugurated the Turkmenistan-China gas pipeline and commencement of gas processing plant in Saman-Depe. The plant was built for refining, purification and annual production of 5 billion cubic metres (180 billion cubic feet) of gas. Additionally, the plant will produce nearly 180,000 tonnes of stable condensate at full capacity. The construction of the facility was subcontracted to Sofregaz and Technip. Turkmenistan is planning on construction of the second plant with capacity for refining 8 billion cubic metres (280 billion cubic feet) per year.

== See also ==
- Bagtyýarlyk
- Central Asia – China gas pipeline
- Ýolöten Gas Field
- Dauletabad gas field
