= Bagtyýarlyk PSA Territory =

Natural gas area in Lebap Province, Turkmenistan

Bagtyýarlyk Gas Field
- Country: Turkmenistan
- Region: Lebap Province
- Offshore/onshore: onshore
- Operators: CNPC International
- Partners: Turkmengas

Field history
- Discovery: 1980s
- Peak of production: 2015-2020

Production
- Estimated gas in place: 1.300×10^{9} cu ft (36.8×10^{6} m^{3})

Bagtyýarlyk is a large contractual PSA territory consisting of several natural gas fields located in Lebap Province of Turkmenistan. It literally means happiness in Turkmen language. Bagtyyarlyk constitutes the bigger part of the gas rich Sagkenar (right bank of the Amu Darya River) area and includes Saman- Depe and Altyn Asyr fields.

== History ==
The 30 year production sharing agreement for exploration and production of Bagtyyarlyk territory was signed in July 2007 between the Turkmen Presidential State Agency for Supervising the Use of Oil and Gas Resources and the China National Petroleum Corporation (CNPC) in Beijing, China. An annual production of 17 billion cubic meters of gas from new fields in Bagtyyarlyk along with 13 billion cubic meters coming from Saman-Depe and Altyn Asyr fields will fill Turkmenistan-China gas pipeline which was inaugurated in December 2009. Total estimated investment in Bagtyyarlyk by CNPC is approximately $1.5 billion.

== Reservoir ==
Gas reserves in Bagtyyarlyk are estimated at 1.3 trillion cubic meters (cm) of natural gas.

== See also ==
- Central Asia – China gas pipeline
- Saman-Depe Gas Field
- Ýolöten Gas Field
- Dauletabad gas field
