= List of countries by total length of pipelines =

This is a sortable list of countries and their total length of pipelines, mostly based on the CIA World Factbook, accessed in November 2015.

* indicates "Pipelines in COUNTRY or TERRITORY" links.

Pipeline length (km) by country
Country	Total	Condensate	Condensate / gas	Gas	LPG	Extra heavy crude	Oil	Oil / gas / water	Refined products	Water	Gathering	Feeder	Transmission	Distribution	Year
Afghanistan	466			466											2007
Albania	610			331			279								2013
Algeria	29,642	2,600		16,415	3,447		7,036		144						2013
Angola	1,507			352	85		1065	5							2013
Argentina	39,850			29,930	41		6,248		3,631						2013
Armenia	2,233			2,233											2013
Australia *	34,612		637	30,054	240		3,609		72						2013
Austria	5,556			4,736			663		157						2013
Azerbaijan *	6,425	89		3,890			2,446								2013
Bahrain	74			20			54								2013
Bangladesh	2,950			2,950											2013
Barbados	103			33			64		6						2013
Belarus	8,705			5,386			1,589		1,730						2013
Belgium	3,828			3,139			154		535						2013
Bolivia	9,646			5,457	51		2,511		1,627						2013
Bosnia and Herzegovina	156			147			9								2013
Brazil	27,468		251	17,312	352		4,831		4,722						2013
Brunei	1,239	33	86	682			492								2013
Bulgaria	3,611			2,887			346		378						2013
Cameroon	1,200			53	5		1,107			35					2013
Canada *	840,000				74,980		23,564				250,000	25,000	117,000	450,000	2019
Chad	582						582								2013
Chile	5,648			3,160	781		985		722						2013
China	169,000	9		104,000			32,000	31	33,000	9					2020
Colombia	15,216			4,991			6,796		3,429						2013
DR Congo	895			62			77		756						2013
Congo	1218			232	4		982								2013
Costa Rica	662								662						2013
Croatia	3,020			2,410			610								2011
Cuba	271			41			230								2013
Czech Republic	7,790			7,160			536		94						2013
Denmark	5,037	11		4,377			647	2							2013
Ecuador	4,255			71		527	2,131		1,526						2013
Egypt	15,660	486	74	7,986	957		5,225	37	895						2013
Equatorial Guinea	197	42	5	79			71								2013
Estonia	868			868											2013
Finland	1,689			1,689											2010
France	23,345			15,322			2,939		5,084						2013
Gabon	2,449			807			1,639			3					2013
Georgia	2,771			1,596			1,175								2013
Germany	34,335	37		26,985			2,826		4,479	8					2013
Ghana	775			394			20		361						2013
Greece	1,423			1,329			94								2013
Guatemala	480						480								2007
Hungary	20,877			19,028			1007		842						2013
India *	36,284		9	17752.697	2,054		8,943	20	11,069				19,000		2012
Indonesia	21,704	1064	150	11,702	119		7,767	77	728	44	53				2013
Iran	80,000	7	973	20,794	570		8,625		7,937						2019
Iraq	10,437			2,455	913		5,432		1,637						2013
Ireland	2,147			2,147											2013
Israel	1,466			763			442		261						2013
Italy	23,190			20,223			1,393		1,574						2013
Ivory Coast	487	101		256			118	5		7					2013
Japan	4,734			4,456			174	104							2013
Jordan	522			473			49								2013
Kazakhstan	26,963	658		12,432			11,313		1,095	1,465					2013
Kenya	932						4		928						2013
Kuwait	858			261			540		57						2013
Kyrgyzstan	496			480			16								2013
Laos	540								540						2007
Latvia	1,343			928					415						2013
Lebanon	88			88											2013
Liberia	4						4								2013
Libya	11,630	882		3,743			7,005								2013
Liechtenstein	20			20											2007
Lithuania	2,042			1,921					121						2013
Luxembourg	169			142					27						2013
Malaysia	9,068	354		6,439	155		1,937	43	114	26					2013
Mexico	37,008			18,074	2,102		8,775	369	7,565	123					2013
Moldova	1,906			1,906											2013
Morocco	1,389			944			270		175						2013
Mozambique	1,250			972					278						2013
Myanmar	4,290			3,739			551								2013
Netherlands	9,906	81		8,531			578		716						2013
New Zealand	2,925	331		1,936	172		288		198						2013
Nicaragua	54						54								2007
Nigeria *	12,714	124		4,045	164		4,441		3,940						2013
North Korea	6						6								2013
North Macedonia	388			268			120								2007
Norway	13,189	578	220	8,044			3,794	457		96					2013
Oman	8,185	106		4,224			3,558	33	264						2013
Pakistan *	16,309			12,646			2,576		1,087						2013
Panama	128						128								2013
Papua New Guinea	264						264								2007
Peru	4,039			1,526	679	786	1,033		15						2013
Philippines	899			576			138		185						2013
Poland	16,349			14,198			1,374		777						2013
Portugal	1,543			1,344			11		188						2013
Qatar	3,830	288	221	2,383	90		745		103						2013
Romania	6,177			3,726			2,451								2013
Russia *	259,913	122		163,872	1,378		80,820	40	13,658	23					2007
Saudi Arabia	10,600	209		2,940	1,183		5,117		1,151						2013
Senegal	51			43					8						2013
Serbia	2,314			1,921			393								2007
Singapore	130			122					8						2013
Slovakia	7,193			6,774			419								2013
Slovenia	849			844			5								2013
South Africa	3,839	94		1,293			992		1,460						2013
South Korea	3,121			2,216			16		889						2007
Spain	14,558			10,481			616		3,461						2013
Sudan	5,839			156			4,070		1,613						2007
Suriname	50						50								2007
Sweden	1,626			1,626											2013
Switzerland	1,901			1,800			94		7						2013
Syria	5,199			3,170			2,029								2013
Taiwan	1,068	25		802			241								2013
Tajikistan	587			549			38								2007
Tanzania	1,210			311			891		8						2013
Thailand	7,085	2		5,900	85		1		1,097						2013
Trinidad and Tobago	2,422	257	11	1,567			587								2013
Tunisia	5,013	68		3,111			1,381		453						2013
Turkey	15,641			12,603			3,038								2013
Turkmenistan *	9,001			7,500			1,501								2013
Ukraine	45,597			36,720			4,514		4,363						2013
United Arab Emirates	7,738	533		3,277	300		3,287	24	218	99					2013
United Kingdom	39,778	502	9	28,603	59		5,256	175	4,919	255					2013
United States	4,023,360			1,614,936		79,192	215,736		62,349		18,155		300,617	1,296,164	2017
Uruguay	417			257			160								2007
Uzbekistan	11,345			10,341			944								2013
Venezuela	16,288			5,941		981	7,588		1,788						2013
Vietnam	1,805	72	398	955			128	33	206	13					2013
Yemen	2,033			641	22		1,370								2013
Zambia	771						771								2007
Zimbabwe	270								270						2007
