= Avgustovka, Samara Oblast =

Avgustovka Августовка
- Village
- Location within Samara Oblast Location within Russia
- Coordinates: 52°15′N 50°44′E
- Country: Russia
- Region: Samara Oblast
- District: Bolshechernigovsky District
- Time zone: UTC+4:00

Avgustovka (Russian: Августовка) is a rural locality (a selo) and the administrative center of Avgustovka Rural Settlement of Bolshechernigovsky District, Samara Oblast, Russia. The population was 2628 as of 2016. There are 37 streets.

== Geography ==
Avgustovka is located 21 km north of Bolshaya Chernigovka (the district's administrative centre) by road. Pekilyanka is the nearest rural locality.
