= East–West Pipeline =

East–West Pipeline or West–East Pipeline may refer to:

- The East–West Crude Oil Pipeline in Saudi Arabia
- The East–West Gas Pipeline in Turkmenistan
- The East West Gas Pipeline in India
- The West–East Gas Pipeline in China
