= Avgustovka, Saratov Oblast =

Avgustovka Августовка
- Village
- Location within Saratov Oblast Location within Russia
- Coordinates: 50°24′N 47°39′E
- Country: Russia
- Region: Saratov Oblast
- District: Novouzensky District
- Time zone: UTC+4:00

Avgustovka (Russian: Августовка) is a rural locality (a selo) in Radyschevskoye Rural Settlement of Novouzensky District, Saratov Oblast, Russia. The population was 67 as of 2010. There are 2 streets.

== Geography ==
The village is located on the left bank of the Maly Uzen River, 43 km west of Novouzensk (the district's administrative centre) by road. Maytubek is the nearest rural locality.
