= Khangiran gas refinery =

Gas refinery in northeastern Iran

Coordinates: 36°28′5″N 60°50′57″E

Hashemi-Nezhad Refinery, also known as Khangiran gas refinery, is a gas refinery in the northeast of Iran, 160 kilometers from Mashhad. It provides cooking and industrial gas for five provinces in the north and east of Iran, including Khorassan, Semnan, and parts of Golestan. The refinery produces 2,300 barrels of solvents, such as paint thinner, naphtha, kerosene, and diesel fuel daily. Additionally, 750 tons of sulfur are produced for industrial uses per day.

Khangiran refinery has a power station consisting of three gas turbines and two steam turbines, each of them having a capacity of 7.5 MW.

== See also ==
- Dauletabad–Sarakhs–Khangiran pipeline
- Khangiran Rural District
