= Batyr Amanov =

Turkmen politician

- Batyr Amanow

Deputy Chairman of the Cabinet of Ministers
- Incumbent
- Assumed office 13 May 2023
- President: Serdar Berdimuhamedow
- Preceded by: Ashyrguly Begliyev

Chairman of Türkmengaz
- In office 3 July 2020 – 13 May 2023
- Preceded by: Myrat Gurbandurdiyevich Archayev
- Succeeded by: Maksat Babayev

Personal details
- Born: Batyr Amangeldiyevich Amanov; 1978 (age 47–48) Ashkhabad, Turkmen SSR, USSR (now Ashgabat, Turkmenistan)
- Education: Turkmen Polytechnical Institute
- Occupation: Politician

Batyr Amangeldiyevich Amanov (Turkmen: Batyr Amangeldiýewiç Amanow, Cyrillic: Батыр Амангелдиевич Аманов; Russian: Батир Амангельдыевич Аманов, romanized: Batir Amangel'dyyevich Amanov; born 1978) is a Turkmen politician who as of May 2023 was serving as Deputy Chairman of the Cabinet of Ministers responsible for oil and gas. He previously served as the chairman of the Türkmengaz State Concern with rank of minister of state.

== Biography ==
Batyr Amanov was born in 1978 in Ashkhabad (now Ashgabat). From 1994 to 2000, Amanov worked in the Ashgabat printing house as a typographer and computer operator. He was graduated from the Turkmen Polytechnical Institute in 2009 as a geodesic engineer. From 2009 to 2012 Amanov worked at the Türkmenýöritenebitgazgurnama Trust of the Türkmennebitgazgurluşyk State Concern. From 2012 to 2013 Amanov worked in the Türkmengazakdyryş Amalgamate of Türkmengaz State Concern. From 2013 to 2017, he was chief specialist of the pipeline construction department of Türkmennebitgazgurluşyk, and was briefly acting department head. From 2017 to 2018 Amanov was acting deputy head of the Türkmengazakdyryş Amalgamate, and from 2018 to 2019 was appointed to that position. Amanov was apparently simultaneously appointed deputy chairman of Türkmengaz on 3 January 2018.

From 2 September 2019 until appointment as chairman of Türkmengaz on 3 July 2020, Amanov was general director of the Türkmenbaşy Petroleum Refining Complex. Amanov was relieved of the chairmanship of Turkmengas on 13 May 2023 and promoted to Deputy Chairman of the Cabinet of Ministers for oil and gas.

== Reprimands ==
- 2 February 2021 - "stern reprimand" for "some errors being committed" during "organization of work at enterprises"
- 5 November 2021 - "stern reprimand with final warning to correct in shortest order errors committed".
- 13 January 2023 - "stern reprimand with final warning...for inappropriate execution of responsibilities and serious deficiencies in work"

Preceded by Ashyrguly Begliyev	Vice President for Oil and Gas; 2021–2023	Incumbent
