= Hyundai Engineering =

Engineering company

Hyundai Engineering Co., Ltd.
- Company type: private company
- Industry: Engineering, Construction
- Founded: 1974
- Headquarters: Seoul, South Korea
- Area served: Worldwide
- Key people: Hyeon-Sung Hong, president
- Revenue: 7.36 (trillion Won, 2021) 5.51 (Billion Dollar, 2021)
- Net income: 2481 (billion Won, 2021) 181 (Million Dollar, 2021)
- Number of employees: 6,478 (2021)
- Website: http://www.hec.co.kr/en

- Hyundai Engineering
- Hangul: 현대엔지니어링
- RR: Hyeondae enjinieoring
- MR: Hyŏndae enjiniŏring

Hyundai Engineering Co., Ltd. or HEC is a company established in 1974. As a global engineering solutions firm that plays a leading role in the areas of plants, architecture, infrastructure and asset management, Hyundai Engineering is expanding into eco-friendly energy to build a sustainable future. In the area of plants, the company provides total solutions for front-end engineering design (FEED) as well as engineering, procurement and construction (EPC). In architecture, it handles business projects involving industrial facilities, ordinary architecture and housing. In infrastructure, it pursues projects involving smart cities and eco-friendly energy. Recently, it has been leading the way toward achieving carbon neutrality by aggressively researching and investing in technology for producing clean hydrogen and turning carbon dioxide into a resource.

== Business areas ==
- Chemical engineering factories, power and energy plants, green energy, construction, housing, infrastructure, asset management

== Major affiliates ==
- Hyundai Engineering & Construction
- Hyundai Motor Company
- Kia

== Overseas branches/offices ==
Asia

- Branches: Taiwan, Malaysia, Bangladesh, Vietnam, China, Indonesia, India, Singapore, Sri Lanka, Cambodia, Thailand, Philippines, Azerbaijan, Uzbekistan, Kazakhstan, Turkmenistan, UAE, Iran, Saudi Arabia, Oman, Iraq
- Offices: Kuwait

Africa

- Branches: Democratic Republic of the Congo, Libya, Algeria, Egypt, Kenya
- Offices: Equatorial Guinea

Europe, America, Oceania

- Branches: Russia, Poland, Hungary, Brazil, Ecuador, Colombia, Panama, Solomon Islands, Nicaragua
- Offices: Italy, U.S. (Houston)

== History ==
- December 1973 – Registered as a vendor at the Korean Ministry of Science and Technology (For plant engineering, specialty technology service)
- February 1974 – Established Hyundai Technology Development Co., Ltd.
- November 1980 – Merged with Halla Engineering Co., Ltd
- March 1982 – Changed the name to “Hyundai Engineering Co., Ltd”
- January 1985 – Performed overseas consulting projects as the first private company in Korea (i.e. 5th and 6th electricity projects in Nepal)
- April 1991 – Receive “”Iron tower order of industrial service” on the 24th World Science Day (한국어보고)
- May 1996 – Received award by the Minister of Government Administration and Home Affairs for “the second award for innovative Management for the private and public sectors” (Korea Chamber of Commerce & Industry, ministry of Government Administration and Home Affairs.
- September 1996 – Received award by the Prime Minister for “The environmental technology award” (Ministry of Government Administration and Home Affairs)
- May 1999 – Merging with Hyundai Engineering & Construction
- January 2001 – Separated from Hyundai Engineering & Construction
- June 2001 – Moved to the new office in Mok-dong
- November 2001 – Established the research institute
- December 2003 – Increased of capital to 18.9 billion Korean won (participation in the share of Korea Development Bank)
- June 2004 – Received an award from the Minister of Commerce, Industry and Energy for “The First National Environment – Friendly Management Award”
- December 2005 – Declared the new vision of the company “HEC 2010”
- January 2007 – Inauguration of the CEO, Joong Kyum KIM
- April 2007 – Hyundai Engineering was awarded the prize of “Civil Engineering Structure” of the year
- June 2007 – Hyundai Engineering was awarded for “2007 National Environmental Prize”
- July 2008 – Reorganization of Hyundai Engineering (HEC)
- February 2009 – 35th anniversary of Hyundai Engineering Co. Ltd & the pronouncement for the VISION 2015
- March 2009 – Inauguration of the new CEO Dong Wook KIM, won the first prize in Engineering Section at “2009 Overseas Construction”, Won the Golden Medal at this year’s “Top Civil Engineering Structure” with Ma-Chang Great Bridge
- October 2009 – Won the “10th Grand Prize of Korea Financial management” (Major Corporate Field) & Hyundai Engineering won the “Prize of Minister of the Environment” in the Merit Award Ceremony of Building Environment-Friendly Industry & Low Carbon- Green Growth
- December 2009 – Awarded a billion-dollar project in Turkmenistan “gas Desulfurization Plant”
- March 2010 – Hyundai Engineering, awarded for the “Tin Tower Order of Industrial Service Merit for the Tax Payer’s Day”
- August 2010 – Ranks 69th of the top 200 international design firms in the world
- April 2011 – Incorporated into Hyundai Motor Group
- June 2011 – Inauguration of the new CEO Wee Chul Kim (President & CEO)
- July 2011 – Ranks 54th of the top 200 international design firms in the world
- January 2012 – Ranks 1st on the Amount of global contract won among Korean construction firms in 2011
- July 2012 – Ranks 47th of the top 225 international design firms
- July 2013 – Ranks 36th of the top 225 international design firms
- December 2013 – Awarded Export Tower of 2 Billion Dollars on the 50th Day of Trade
- April 2014 – Merged with Hyundai Amco
- October 2014 – Credit ratings upgraded to 'AA−'
- August 2015 – Ranks 26th of the top 225 international design firms in the world
- November 2015 – Acquired ISO 27001 Certificates
- June 2016 – Awarded both ‘Golden Valve Award’ and ‘Platinum Pipe Award' at 2016 Intergraph Awards
- July 2016 – Ranks 21st of the top 225 international design firms in the world
- March 2016 – Awarded a 2.93 billion-dollar project in Kuwait "Al-Zour LNG Import Terminal”
- September 2016 – Successfully completed the KMM Complete-Auto Plant in Mexico
- July 2017 – Ranks 24th of the top 225 international design firms in the world
- February 2017 – Inauguration of the new CEO Sang Rok Sung (President & CEO)
- September 2017 – Turkmenistan TACE Site Achieves 60 Million Injury-Free Manhours
- November 2017 – HEC Uzbekistan office wins the Presidential Commendation for Global CSR in ‘The 5th Most Beloved Companies in Korea Awards’
- December 2017 – Receives Commendation Award from the President of the Republic of Korea during “The Korean Government’s Rewarding of Those Who Have Contributed to Creating Jobs”
- July 2018 – Ranks 29th of the top 225 international design firms in the world
- August 2018 Ranks sixth in the 2018 construction capability assessment, whose results were announced by the Ministry of Land, Infrastructure and Transport (MOLIT)

== See also ==
- Economy of South Korea
- List of South Korean companies
