= Shahym Abdrahmanov =

Turkmen politician and geologist (born 1963)

Shahym Abdrahamov (Turkmen: Şahym Abdrahmanow) is a Turkmen political figure and petroleum geologist.

Abdrahmanov was born in 1963 in Ýagtyýol, Garagum district, of Mary province of Turkmenistan. He graduated in 1986 from the Turkmen State Politechnical Institute, majoring in mining engineering and geology.

Abdrahmanov first worked as a geologist for the Türkmengeologiýa State Corporation. From 2005 to 2005 he was employed as chief geologist of the Ýaşyldepe oil and gas extraction directorate of the Türkmennebit State Concern, and from 2006 to 2014 he headed the Lebapnebitgazgözleg directorate of Türkmengeologiýa. From 2014 to 2017 Abdrahmanov headed the Marynebitgazgözleg directorate of Türkmengeologiýa, and from 2017 to 2020 he was chairman of the Türkmengeologiýa State Corporation.

In July 2020 Abdrahmanov was appointed rector of the International Oil and Gas University in Ashgabat. On 11 February 2021, Abdrahmanov was appointed deputy prime minister of Turkmenistan for oil and gas. He was removed from that position "in connection with reassignment to other work" on 10 February 2023.

== Awards ==
- «Türkmenistanyň Bitaraplygynyň 25 ýyllygyna» (25 Years of Turkmenistan's Neutrality)

== Reprimands ==
- 5 November 2021 - reprimand for "inappropriate discharge of responsibilities, weakening of control of activities of the sector".
- 8 April 2022 - stern reprimand for "inadequacies in the sector's work in the first quarter of the current year"
- 13 January 2023 - stern reprimand "with final warning to correct in short order inadequacies committed" for "inappropriate discharge of responsibilities, serious inadequacies committed in the work".

Preceded by Myratgeldi Meredov	Deputy Prime Minister for Oil and Gas; 2021–2023	Succeeded by Ashyrguly Begliyev
