= Emba (river) =

River in western Kazakhstan

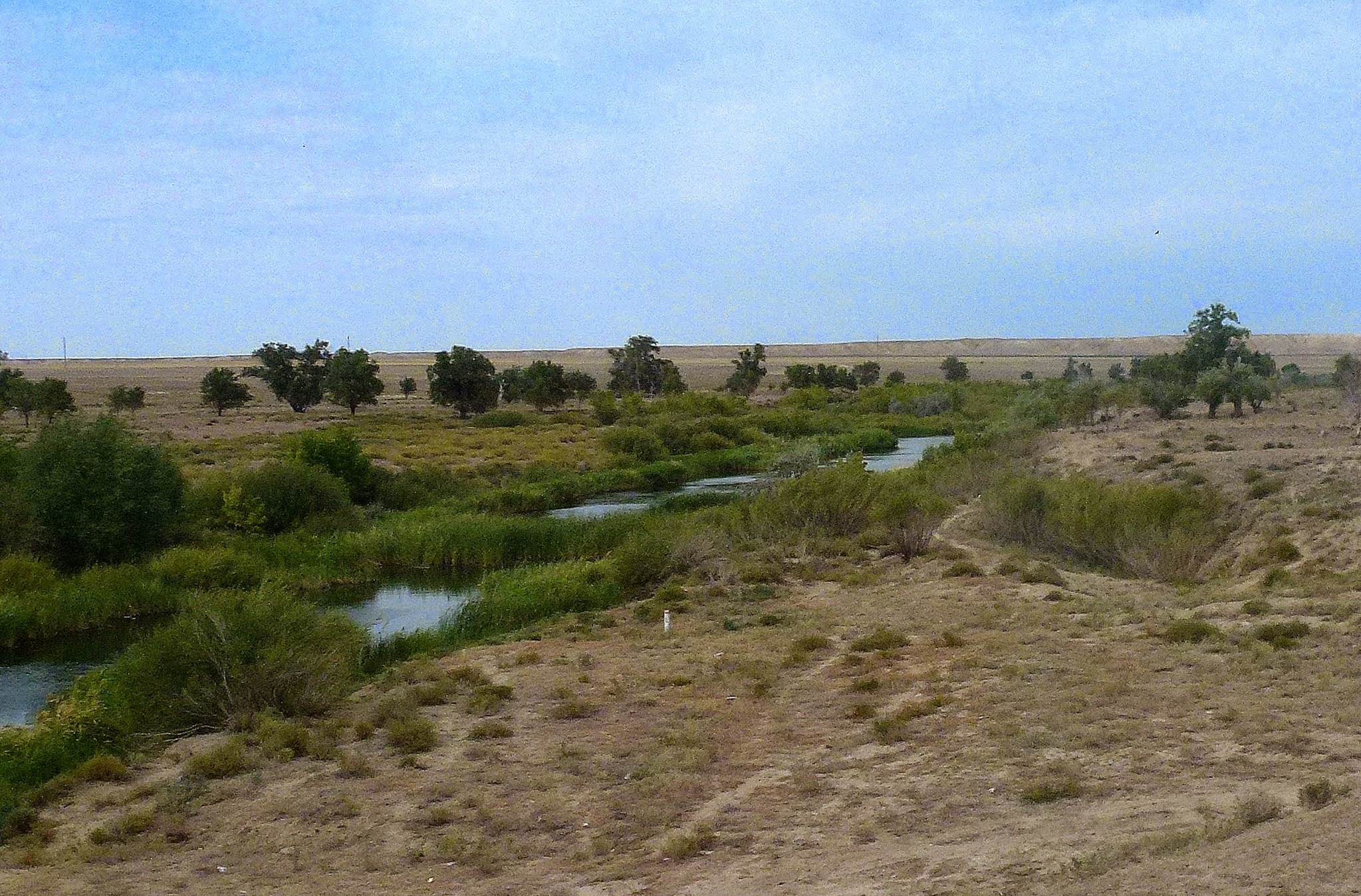

- Mouth location in Kazakhstan

Location
- Country: Kazakhstan

Physical characteristics
- Mouth: Caspian Sea
  - coordinates: 46°37′42″N 53°19′02″E
- Length: 712 km (442 mi)
- Basin size: 40,400 km^{2} (15,600 sq mi)

The Emba (Kazakh: Ембі Embı or Жем Jem, Russian: Эмба) in west Kazakhstan rises in the Mugodzhar Hills and flows across the Sub-Ural Plateau and Caspian Depression into the Caspian Sea. It is 712 kilometres (442 mi) long, and has a drainage basin of 40,400 square kilometres (15,600 sq mi). It flows through the north of the Ust-Urt plateau, and reaches the Caspian by a series of shallow lagoons, which were navigable in the 18th century. The lower course traverses an area of salt domes and the petroleum-rich Emba fields. It is sometimes regarded as a definition for the natural boundary between Europe and Asia.

In its upper course, the Emba is a small river, its valley barely over 2,000 metres (6,600 ft) wide. Lower down, after the waters of the Temir River flow into it, the Emba's valleys widen to almost 7 kilometres (4 mi). The Emba flows in a single channel, only breaking off into little arms in places. But around 100 kilometres (62 mi) before it enters the Caspian Sea, it breaks off in places to form several lakes, which are connected to each other through slender channels that only run during flooding. The Emba is a snow-fed river. It freezes over in winter, a process that begins in November and lasts until March.

== Oil basin ==
The oil basin of the Emba lies between the Mugodzhar Hills in the east and the Volga in the west. This area was known since olden days as Maily Kiyan, which means the land blessed with miracle oil. The British merchant Gok mentioned in the mid-17th century that during his travels he came to a spring near the Emba River that spouted oil instead of water. Between 1919 and 1921 the Bolsheviks tried to build the Algemba railway and pipeline from Alexandrov Gay, so as to provide a means of conveying the oil from the recently captured oil field to the centre of Russia. However, due to logistical problems, the project failed with substantial loss of life.

== Places on the banks of the Emba ==
- Embi (town)
- Zhem (town)
