= Dauletabad–Sarakhs–Khangiran pipeline =

Natural gas pipeline between Turkmenistan and Iran

Dauletabad–Salyp Yar pipeline

Location
- Country: Turkmenistan, Iran
- Direction: east–west
- Start: Dauletabad gas field, Central Asia – Center gas pipeline system, Turkmenistan
- Passes through: Serakhs
- To: Khangiran, Iran

General information
- Type: natural gas
- Operator: Türkmengaz
- Commissioned: 2010

Technical information
- Length: 182 km (113 mi)
- Maximum discharge: 12 billion cubic meters per year
- Diameter: 48 in (1,219 mm)

The Dauletabad–Sarakhs–Khangiran pipeline (also known as Dauletabad–Salyp Yar pipeline) is a natural gas pipeline from the Dauletabad gas field in Turkmenistan to Khangiran in Iran, where it is connected with the Iran Gas Trunkline system. It is significant as it allows the diversification of Turkmenistan's gas export routes, doubling the nation's export of gas to Iran. For Iran, the pipeline allows the country to deal with gas shortages in its northern regions, and to improve its reputation as a trade partner in the Caspian region. Gas began pumping on 3 January 2010, and the pipeline was inaugurated in a ceremony in Turkmenistan on 6 January 2010.

== History and inauguration ==
The decision to build the pipeline was made in July 2009. The pipeline was completed in October 2009, and was inaugurated on 6 January 2010, by presidents Mahmoud Ahmadinejad and Gurbanguly Berdimuhamedow at a ceremony held at the border village of Salyp Yar, Serakhs in Ahal Province, Turkmenistan. At the inauguration, Ahmadinejad said, "These two are not just economic projects, but are indications of the two nations' profound bonds and interest as well as the two countries' fair relations in the region ... This pipeline will be a good stimulus for energy co-operation between Turkmenistan and Iran, as well as for delivery of Turkmen gas to the Persian Gulf and the world market." The ceremony was also attended by Taner Yıldız, the minister of energy and natural resources of Turkey, and Ahmed Mohammed Ali Al-Madani, president of the Islamic Development Bank.

== Technical features ==
The total length of the pipeline is 182 kilometres (113 mi). The pipeline starts at the Dauletabad gas field where it branches off from the Dovletabad–Deryalyk pipeline (Central Asia – Center gas pipeline system). It runs 30.5 kilometres (19.0 mi) to Sarakhs, where it crosses the Iran–Turkmenistan border. From there, the 35-kilometre (22 mi) long section transports gas to the Shahid Hasheminejad (Khangiran) Gas Refinery in Khangiran, Khorasan province. Later the pipeline will be extended to Sangbast area.

The pipeline has an initial capacity of 6 billion cubic meters (bcm) of natural gas per year, which later will be increased up to 12 bcm. Combined with the other, smaller, Turkmenistan–Iran pipeline, the Korpezhe–Kurt Kui pipeline, Turkmenistan will have the capacity to transport up to 20 bcm of gas. The pipeline has a diameter of 48 inches (1,200 mm). Construction costs for the pipeline totaled US$180 million.

== See also ==
- Korpezhe–Kurt Kui pipeline
