= Bolshechernigovsky District =

Bolshechernigovsky District Большечерниговский район (Russian)
- District
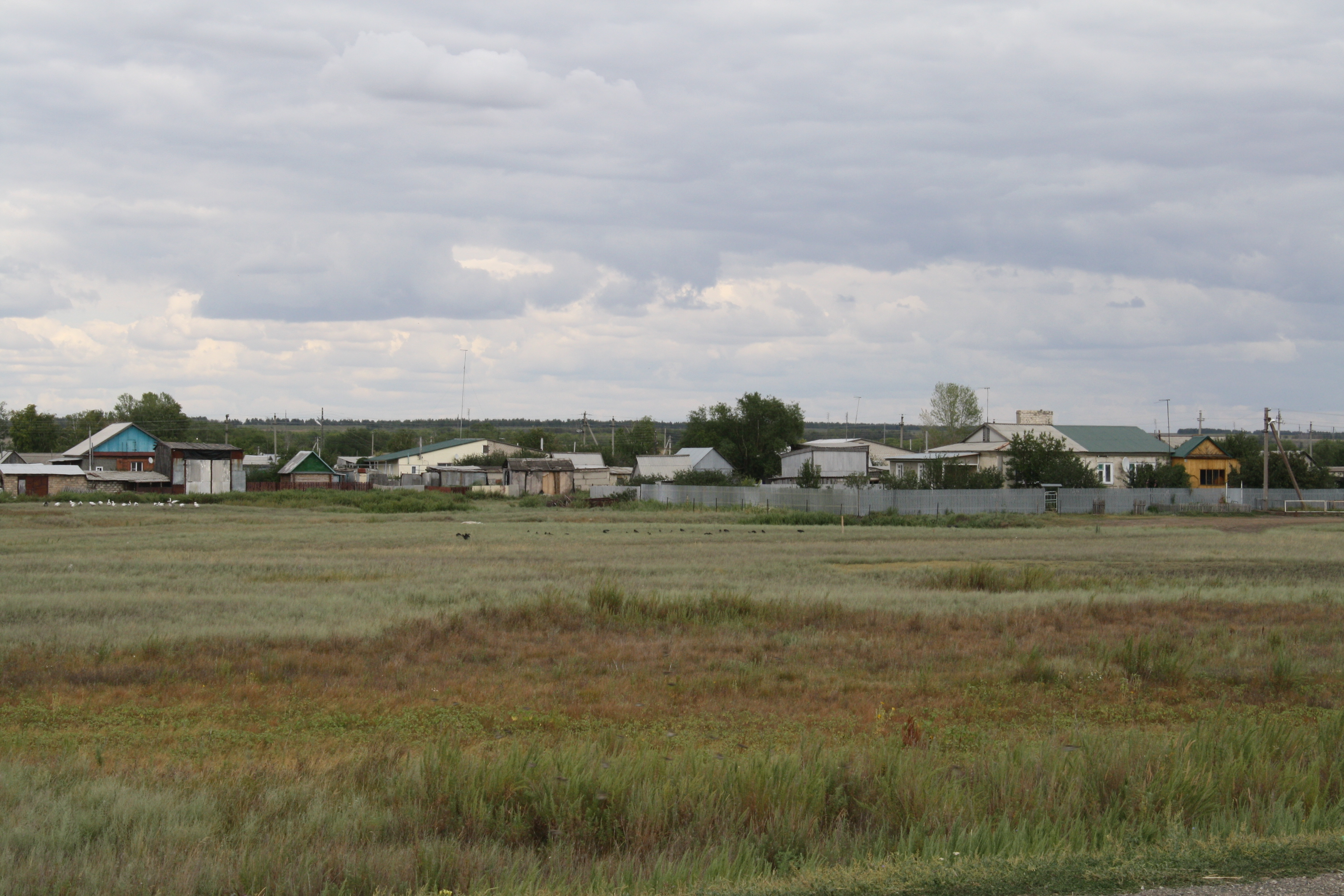
- In Bolshechernigovsky District

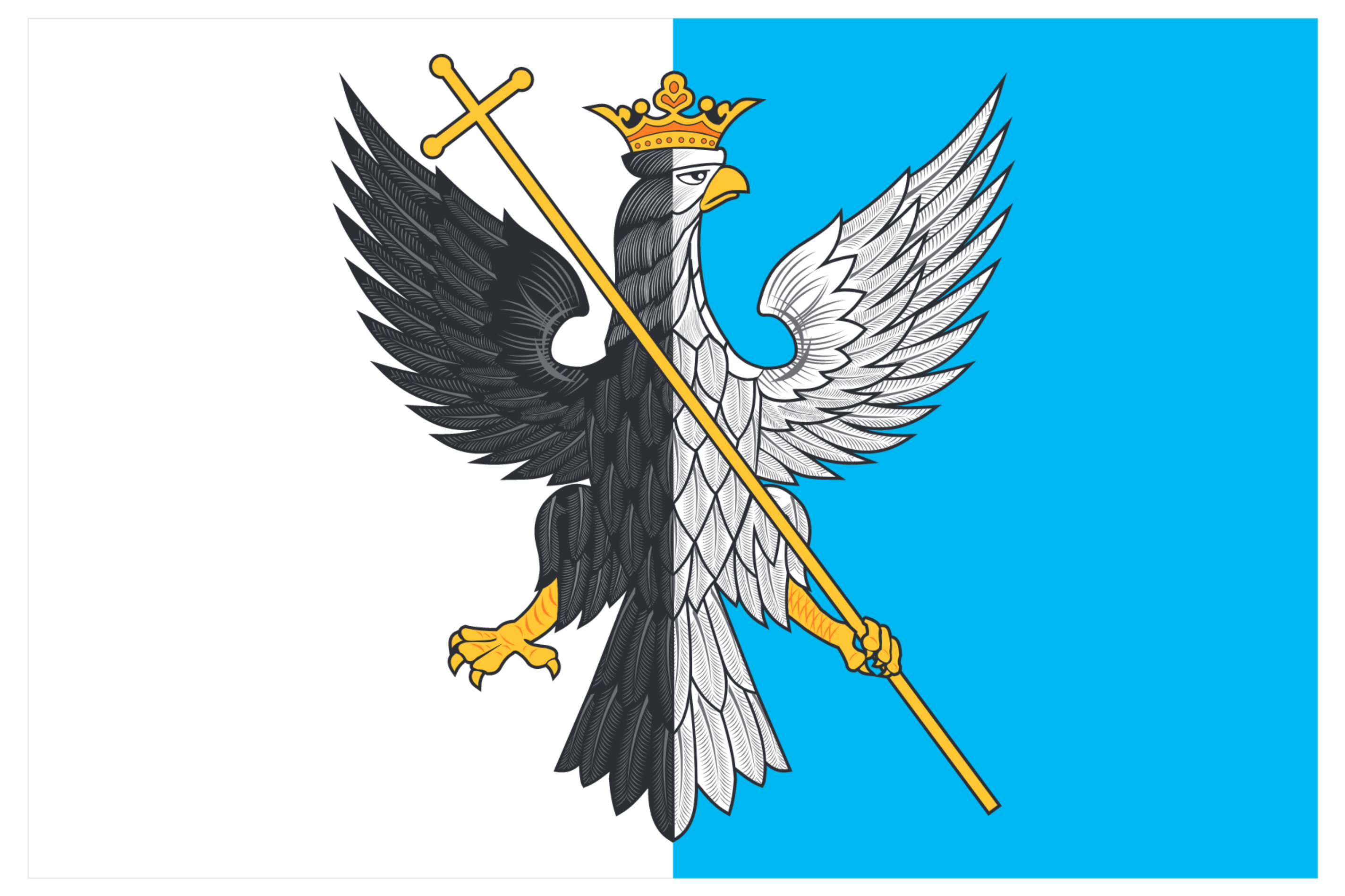
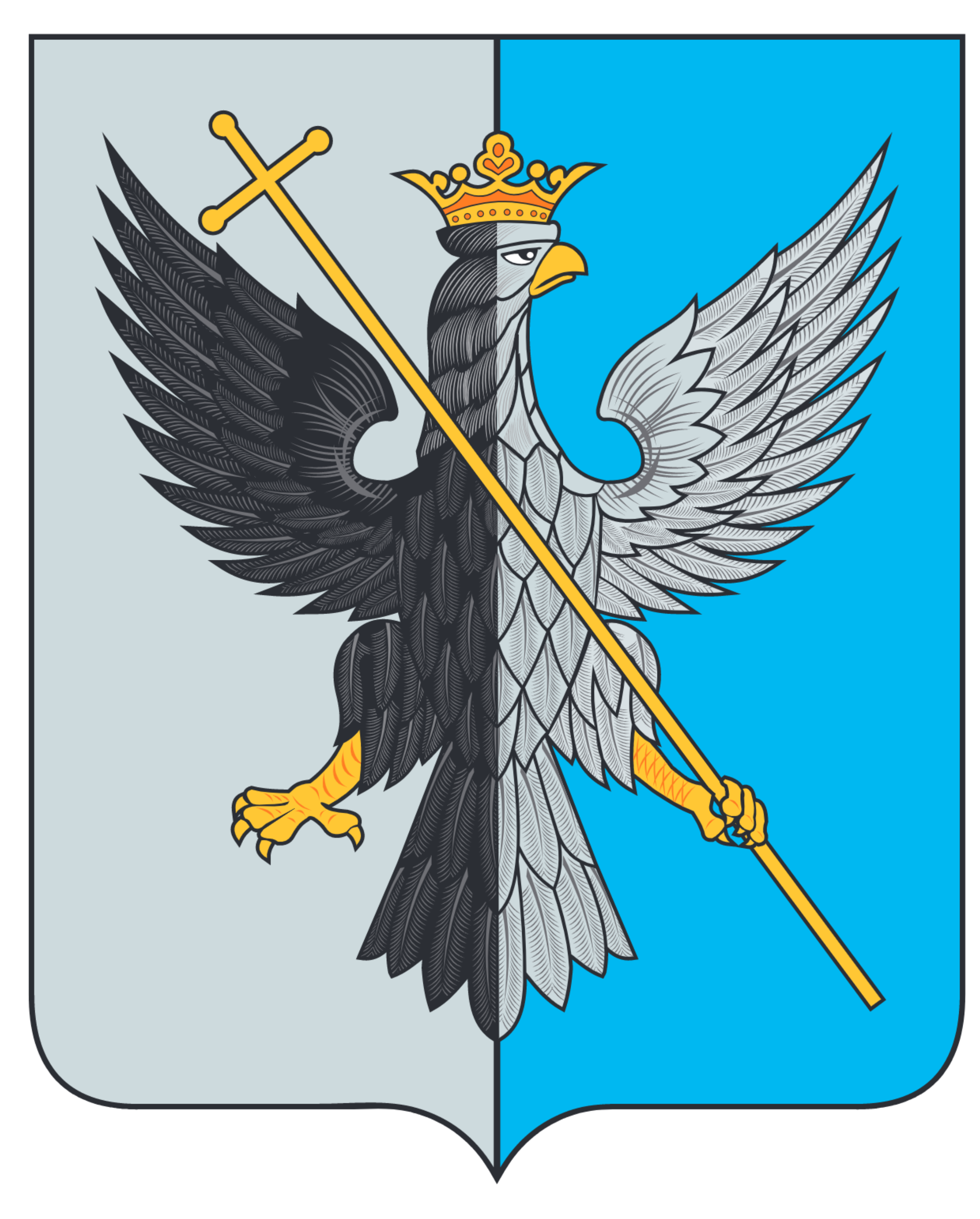
- Flag Coat of arms
- Location of Bolshechernigovsky District in Samara Oblast
- Coordinates: 52°06′N 50°52′E
- Country: Russia
- Federal subject: Samara Oblast
- Established: February 19, 1935
- Administrative center: Bolshaya Chernigovka

Area
  - Total: 2,805.9 km^{2} (1,083.4 sq mi)

Population (2010 Census)
  - Total: 19,153
  - Estimate (January 2016): 18,000
  - Density: 6.8260/km^{2} (17.679/sq mi)
  - Urban: 0%
  - Rural: 100%

Administrative structure
  - Inhabited localities: 34 rural localities

Municipal structure
  - Municipally incorporated as: Bolshechernigovsky Municipal District
  - Municipal divisions: 0 urban settlements, 9 rural settlements
- Time zone: UTC+4 (MSK+1)
- OKTMO ID: 36610000
- Website: http://chernig.samregion.ru

Population of Bolshechernigovsky District
- 2010 Census: 20,477
- 2002 Census: 20,766
- 1989 Census: 21,412
- 1979 Census: 19,954

Bolshechernigovsky District (Russian: Большечерни́говский райо́н) is an administrative and municipal district (raion), one of the twenty-seven in Samara Oblast, Russia. It is located in the south of the oblast. The area of the district is 2,805.9 square kilometers (1,083.4 sq mi). Its administrative center is the rural locality (a selo) of Bolshaya Chernigovka. As of the 2010 Census, the total population of the district was 20,477, with the population of Bolshaya Chernigovka accounting for 33.2% of that number.

== History ==
The district was established on February 19, 1935.

== Notable people ==
- Hadiya Davletshina, Bashkir poet, writer, and playwright
