= Bolshaya Chernigovka =

Rural locality in Samara Oblast, Russia

Coordinates: 52°05′39″N 50°52′04″E

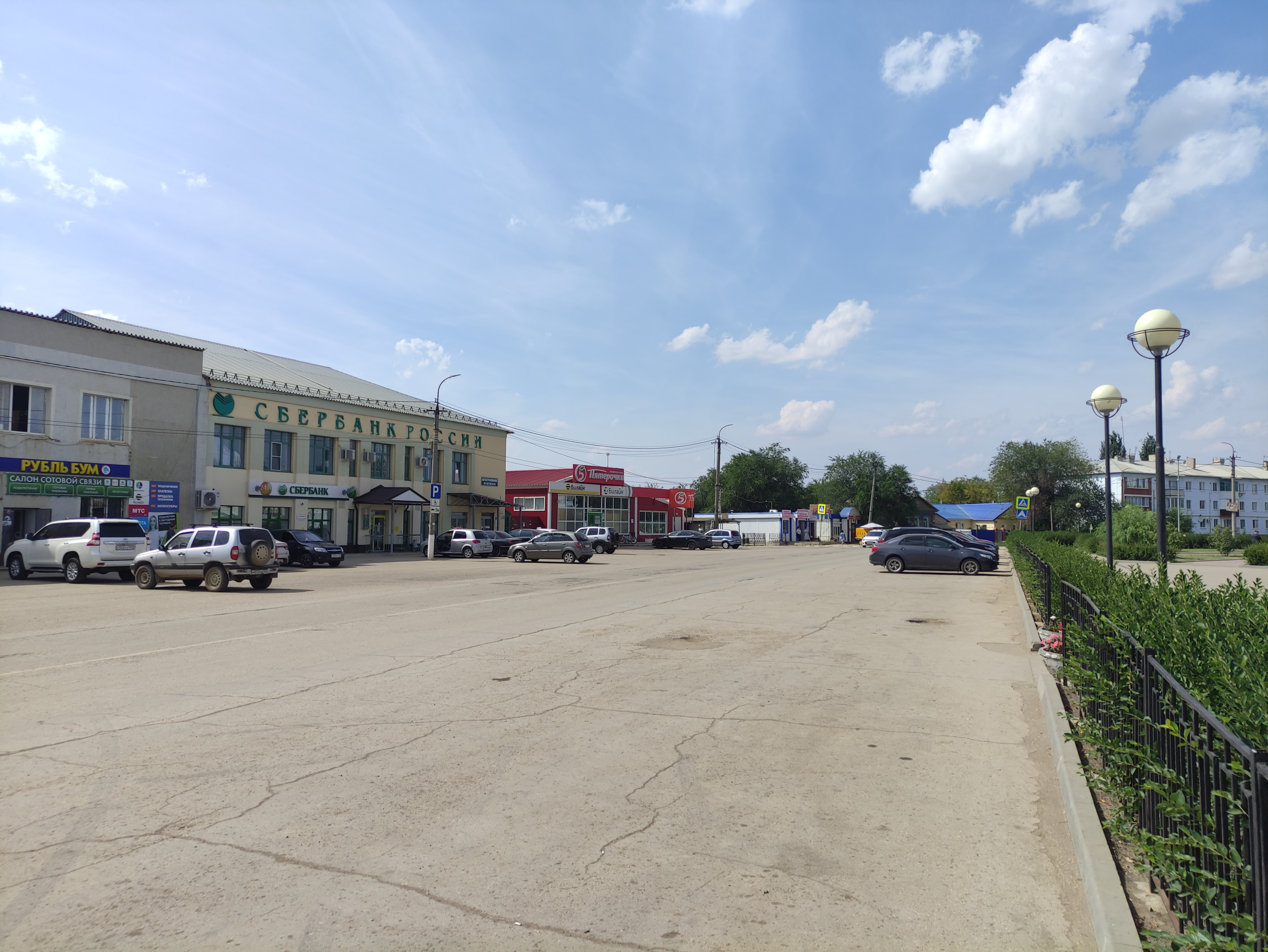
Bolshaya Chernigovka center

Bolshaya Chernigovka (Russian: Большая Черниговка) is a rural locality (a selo) and the administrative center of Bolshechernigovsky District, Samara Oblast, Russia. Population: 6,356 (2010 census); 6,318 (2002 census); 6,274 (1989 Soviet census). It takes its name from the Ukrainian city Chernihiv.
