= Hyundai Amco =

South Korean construction company

Hyundai Amco Co. Ltd. (Korean: 엠코건설), was a Korean construction company founded in October 2002 in Yangjae-dong Seocho-gu Seoul, South Korea. Currently, the company's CEO is Kim Chang Hee. AMCO is licensed by the Hyundai Motor Company, and its main line of business is construction products. The company researches new technologies such as the modularization method, and floating dock technology.

== Business products ==
- Construction
- Civil
- Overseas
- Housing
- Facility Management

== Projects ==
- 2002: Kia Motors Hwaseong plant construction.
- 2003: Hyundai Motor Company – Namyang Design Center construction, Jeju Haevichi Resort condominium construction, Hyundai Motor Company Jeonju plant full-construction.
- 2004: Kia Motors Hwaseong Plant inner gymnasium construction.
- 2005: Hyundai Kia Motors research center full-construction, and Namyang Rollinghills construction.
- 2006: Hyundai Motor Manufacturing Czech Plant, in Nosovice, Czech Republic.

== See also ==
- Hyundai Motor Company
- Hyundai Kia Automotive Group
