= Kulsary =

- Town
- Location in Kazakhstan
- Coordinates: 46°59′N 54°01′E
- Country: Kazakhstan
- Region: Atyrau Region
- District: Zhylyoi District

Government
  - Akim: Kadirzhan Adinov

Area
  - Total: 15 sq mi (40 km^{2})

Population (2009)
  - Total: 51,097
- Time zone: UTC+5 (Central Asia Time)

Kulsary (Kazakh: Құлсары, Qūlsary) is a town and the center of the Zhylyoi District in the Atyrau Region of western Kazakhstan. Population: 51,097 (2009 census results); 38,518 (1999 census results).

The city is located 11 kilometers from the Emba River, and 230 kilometers from the city of Atyrau, the center of the Atyrau Region. The railroad station is on the Makat-Beyneu line.

Kulsary was established in 1937 after the discovery of oil and natural gas in the area. It was granted the status of a work settlement in 1941 and became a district center in 1954.

== Climate ==
Kulsary has a cold desert climate (Köppen climate classification: BWk).

Climate data for Kulsary (1991–2020)
Month	Jan	Feb	Mar	Apr	May	Jun	Jul	Aug	Sep	Oct	Nov	Dec	Year
Mean daily maximum °C (°F)	−4.2 (24.4)	−2.6 (27.3)	6.5 (43.7)	18.5 (65.3)	26.5 (79.7)	32.6 (90.7)	34.8 (94.6)	33.4 (92.1)	25.8 (78.4)	16.7 (62.1)	5.3 (41.5)	−2.0 (28.4)	15.9 (60.6)
Daily mean °C (°F)	−7.9 (17.8)	−7.0 (19.4)	1.2 (34.2)	11.7 (53.1)	19.5 (67.1)	25.5 (77.9)	27.9 (82.2)	26.0 (78.8)	18.6 (65.5)	10.0 (50.0)	0.8 (33.4)	−5.6 (21.9)	10.1 (50.2)
Mean daily minimum °C (°F)	−10.9 (12.4)	−10.6 (12.9)	−2.7 (27.1)	6.4 (43.5)	13.7 (56.7)	19.2 (66.6)	21.6 (70.9)	19.5 (67.1)	12.5 (54.5)	4.7 (40.5)	−2.6 (27.3)	−8.6 (16.5)	5.2 (41.4)
Average precipitation mm (inches)	11.3 (0.44)	9.8 (0.39)	14.0 (0.55)	21.3 (0.84)	22.1 (0.87)	20.7 (0.81)	11.8 (0.46)	5.6 (0.22)	6.9 (0.27)	11.1 (0.44)	15.5 (0.61)	16.2 (0.64)	166.5 (6.56)
Average precipitation days (≥ 1.0 mm)	3.4	2.9	3.4	3.2	3.6	2.5	2.0	1.0	1.5	2.2	3.1	4.4	33.2
Source: NOAA

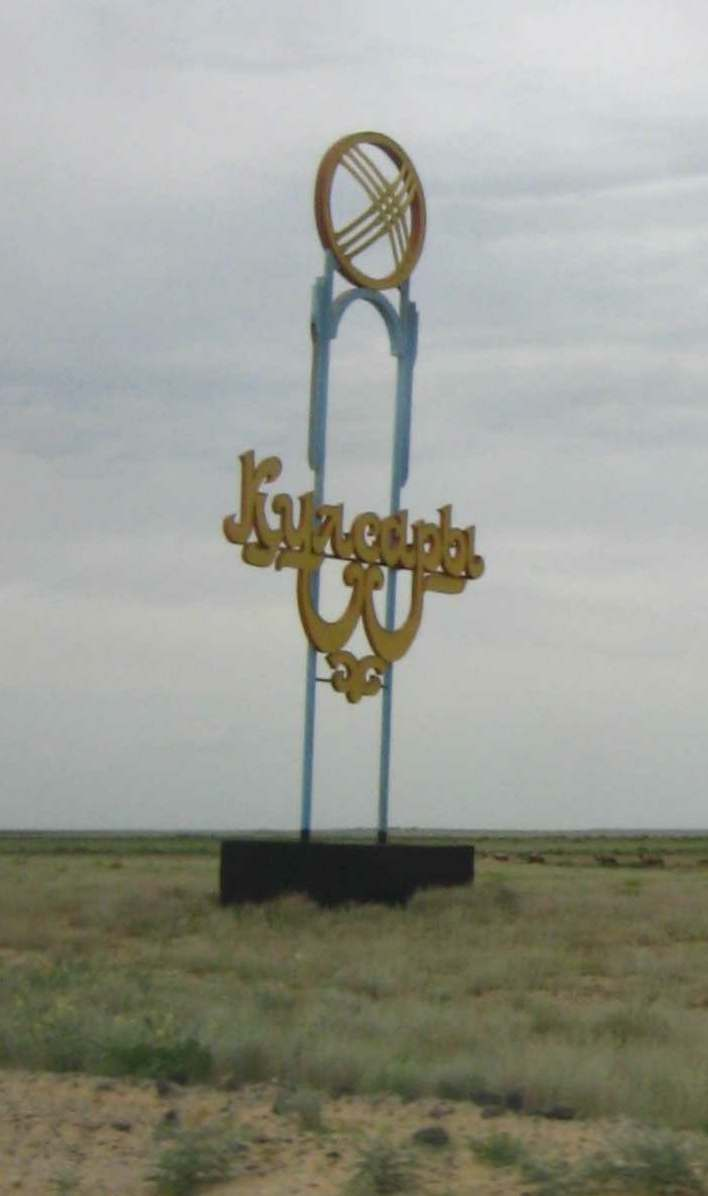
Kulsary

== Notable people ==
- Vadim Mișin (1945–2016), Moldovan politician
