= Uralsk electoral district =

Constituency created for 1917 Russian Constituent Assembly election

Uralsk
- Former Civilian constituency for the All-Russian Constituent Assembly
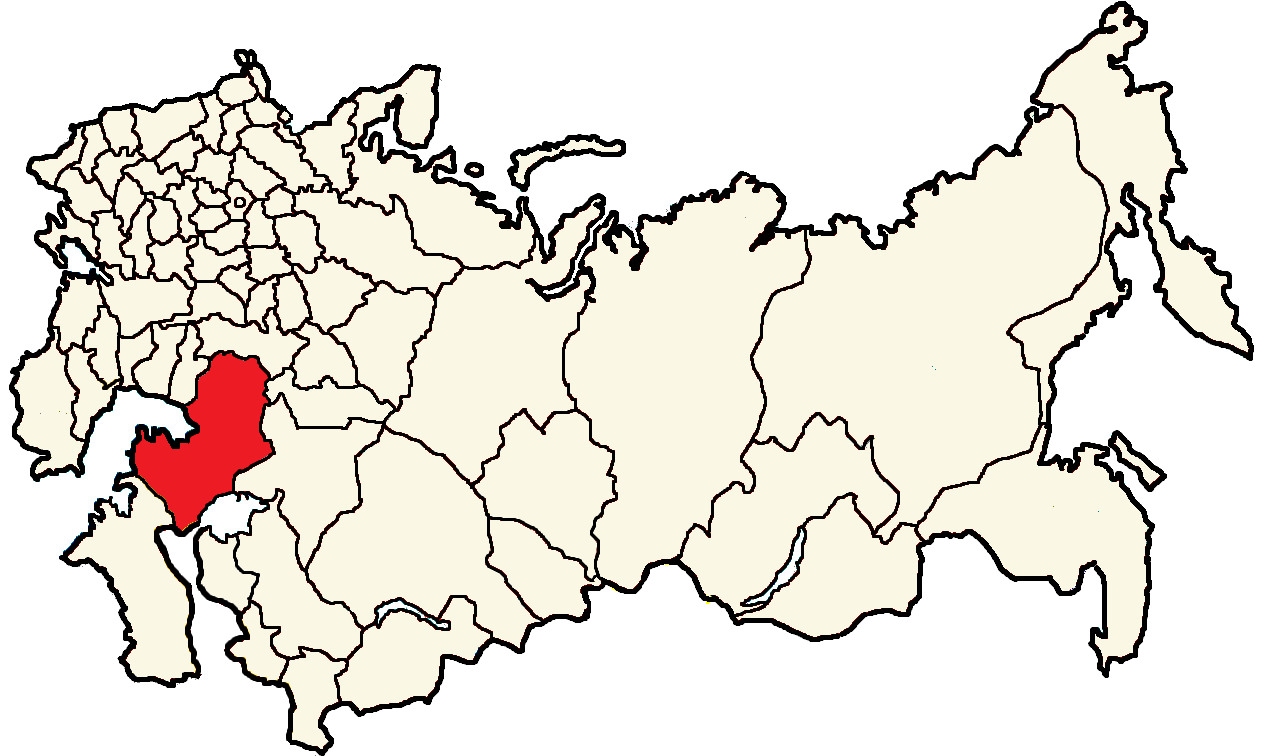

Former constituency
- Created: 1917
- Abolished: 1918
- Number of members: 6
- Number of Uyezd Electoral Commissions: 5
- Number of Urban Electoral Commissions: 1
- Number of Parishes: 122

The Uralsk electoral district (Russian: Уральский избирательный округ) was a constituency created for the 1917 Russian Constituent Assembly election. The electoral district covered the Ural Oblast as well as the Mangyshlak uezd of the Transcaspian Oblast (except for areas inhabited by Turkmens).

In Uralsk town 11,827 out of 25,163 eligible voters cast their ballots; the Cossack list got 7,248 votes, the Peasants' Deputies list 2,737 votes, the Kirghiz (Alash Party) list 976 votes and the SR list 866 votes. In Lbishchensky uezd the Alash list obtained 75,542 votes.

== Results ==
Uralsk
| Party | Vote | % |
|---|---|---|
| List 1 - Ural Regional Kirghiz Committee | 278,014 | 75.01 |
| List 3 - Military Committee of the Ural Cossack Host | 61,476 | 16.59 |
| List 4 - Soviet of Peasants and Non-Resident Deputies | 26,059 | 7.03 |
| List 2 - Socialist-Revolutionaries | 5,076 | 1.37 |
| Total: | 370,625 | |

Deputies Elected
| Alibekov | Ural Regional Kirghiz Committee |
| Dosmukhamedov, J. D. | Ural Regional Kirghiz Committee |
| Dosmukhamedov, K. D. | Ural Regional Kirghiz Committee |
| Ipmagambetov | Ural Regional Kirghiz Committee |
| Karatlev | Ural Regional Kirghiz Committee |
| Borodin | Cossack |
