= Dauletabad gas field =

Gas field in Turkmenistan

- Country: Turkmenistan
- Region: Amu-Darya Basin
- Location: Mary Province
- Offshore/onshore: onshore
- Operator: Türkmengaz

Field history
- Discovery: 1974
- Start of production: 1982

Production
- Recoverable gas: 25,000×10^{9} cu ft (710×10^{9} m^{3})
- Producing formations: Hauterivian stage Early Cretaceous red sandstone reservoir of the Shatlyk horizon

The Dauletabad Gas Field (also Döwletabat, Dauletabad-Donmez, and until 1991 known as Sovietabad) is a large natural gas field located in Mary, Mary province, Turkmenistan. It is located in the vicinity of the Turkmenistan–Iran border, and is named after the Dowlatabad settlement across the border in Iran. The field is a part of the Amu-Darya oil-gas province.

== History ==
The Dauletabad structural feature was detected during geological surveys in 1957–1960. The Dauletabad arch was confirmed by seismic surveys in 1968. The exploratory wells confirming existence of natural gas reserves were drilled in 1972–1974. Production started at the Dauletabad field in 1982.

After the independence of Turkmenistan, production declined significantly, but increased again after 1998. The gas is exported via the Central Asia-Center gas pipeline system. Starting from December 2009, gas is supplied also to Iran through the Dauletabad–Salyp Yar pipeline.

== Reserves ==
Before production started in 1982, recoverable reserves of natural gas were estimated about 60 trillion cubic feet (1.7×10^{12} m^{3}). In 1992, its estimated recoverable reserves were 48.7 trillion cubic feet (1.38×10^{12} m^{3}) of natural gas. In 1997, the United States independent consultancy DeGolyer and McNaughton certified recoverable reserves at about 25 trillion cubic feet (710×10^{9} m^{3}). In 2005, the Asian Development Bank estimated gross reserves 49.5 trillion cubic feet (1.40×10^{12} m^{3}).

It was considered to be the largest gas field in Turkmenistan until thorough evaluation of reserves at a newly discovered Yolotan field were made public.

The Dauletabad field has been cited as a possible supply source for the Trans-Afghanistan Pipeline, but according to the Asian Development Bank, the field's production forecasts are "lower than expected" and "production is predicted to decline."

== See also ==
- Dauletabad–Salyp Yar pipeline
- Turkmenistan-China gas pipeline
- Bagtyýarlyk contractual territory
- Ýolöten Gas Field
- Saman-Depe Gas Field
