= Zhylyoi District =

Coordinates: 47°00′00″N 53°58′48″E

Zhylyoi
- District
- Жылыой ауданы
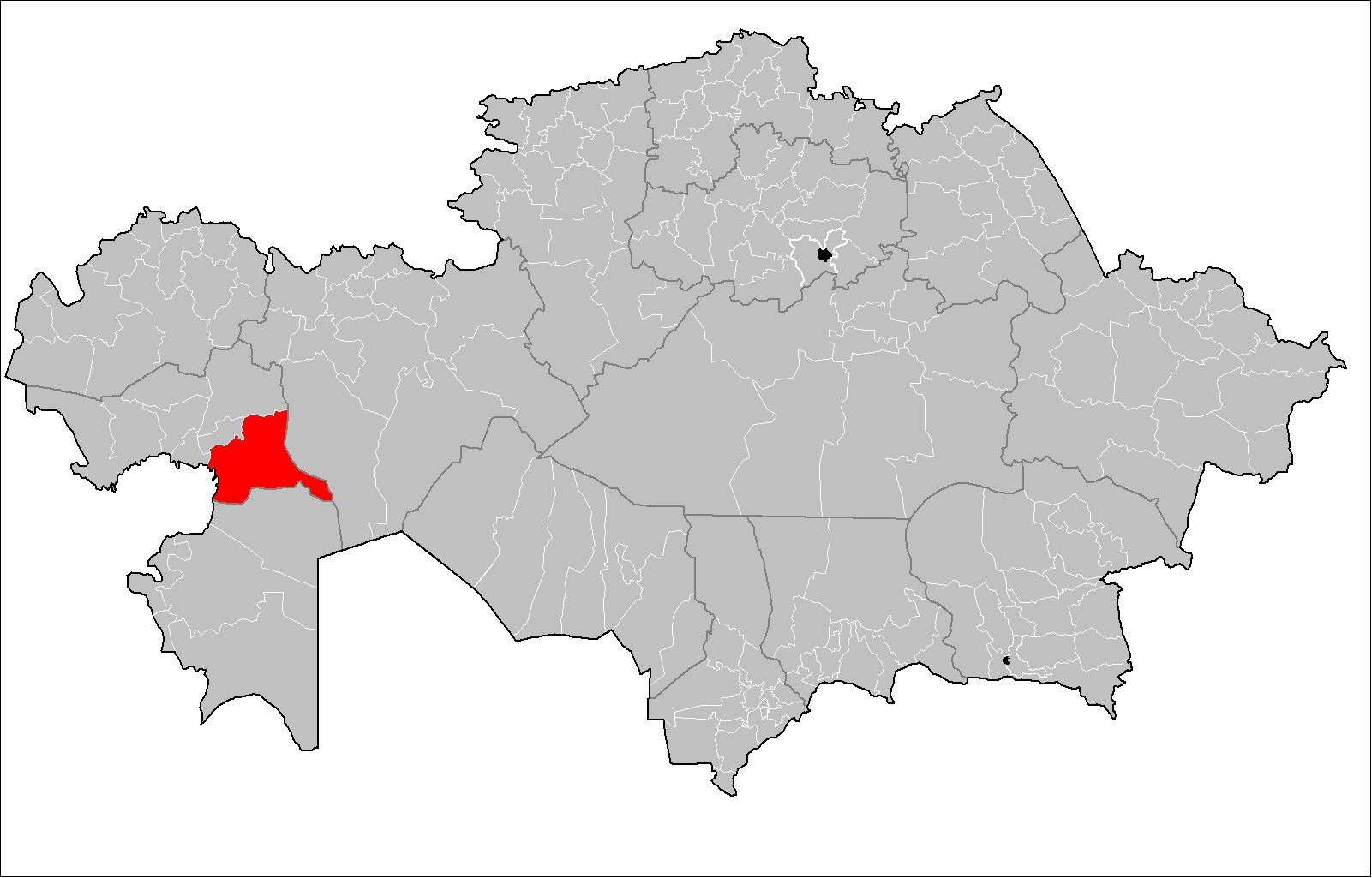
- Country: Kazakhstan
- Region: Atyrau Region
- Administrative center: Kulsary

Government
  - Akim: Karazhanov Zhumabek Barakbaevich

Area
  - Total: 11,400 sq mi (29,400 km^{2})

Population (2013)
  - Total: 75,377
- Time zone: UTC+5 (West)

Zhylyoi District (Kazakh: Жылыой ауданы, Jylyoi audany) is a district located in the south-eastern region of Atyrau Region in Kazakhstan. The administrative center of the district is the town of Kulsary. Population: 75,377 (2013 estimate); 70,156 (2009 census results); 57,052 (1999 census results).

== History ==
The district was formed in 1928 under the name Zhilokosinsky district. In 1963 it was renamed into Embinsky district. The current name is from October 7, 1993.
