= Korpeje–Kordkuy pipeline =

Turkmenistani–Iranian natural-gas route

Korpezhe–Kurt Kui pipeline

Location
- Country: Turkmenistan, Iran
- Direction: north-south
- Start: Korpeje field, Turkmenistan
- To: Kordkuy, Iran

General information
- Type: natural gas
- Partners: Türkmengaz, National Iranian Oil Company
- Commissioned: 1997

Technical information
- Length: 200 km (120 mi)
- Maximum discharge: 8 billion m^{3} per year

The Korpeje–Kordkuy pipeline is a 200-kilometre (120 mi) long natural gas pipeline from Korpeje field north of Okarem in western Turkmenistan to Kordkuy in Iran. 135 kilometres (84 mi) of pipeline run in Turkmenistan while 65 kilometres (40 mi) run in Iran.

In October 1995, National Iranian Oil Company decided to build the pipeline to supply the remote northern part of Iran. The pipeline was built in 1997 and it cost US$190 million. Iran financed 90% of construction costs, which was later paid back by gas deliveries. The capacity of pipeline is 8 billion cubic metres (280×10^{9} cu ft) per year. It has a diameter of 1,000 millimetres (39 in).

The pipeline was inaugurated on 29 December 1997 by presidents Saparmurat Niyazov and Mohammad Khatami.

== See also ==
- Dauletabad–Salyp Yar pipeline
