= Central Asia–Center gas pipeline system =

Gazprom pipeline in Turkmenistan, Uzbekistan, Kazakhstan and Russia

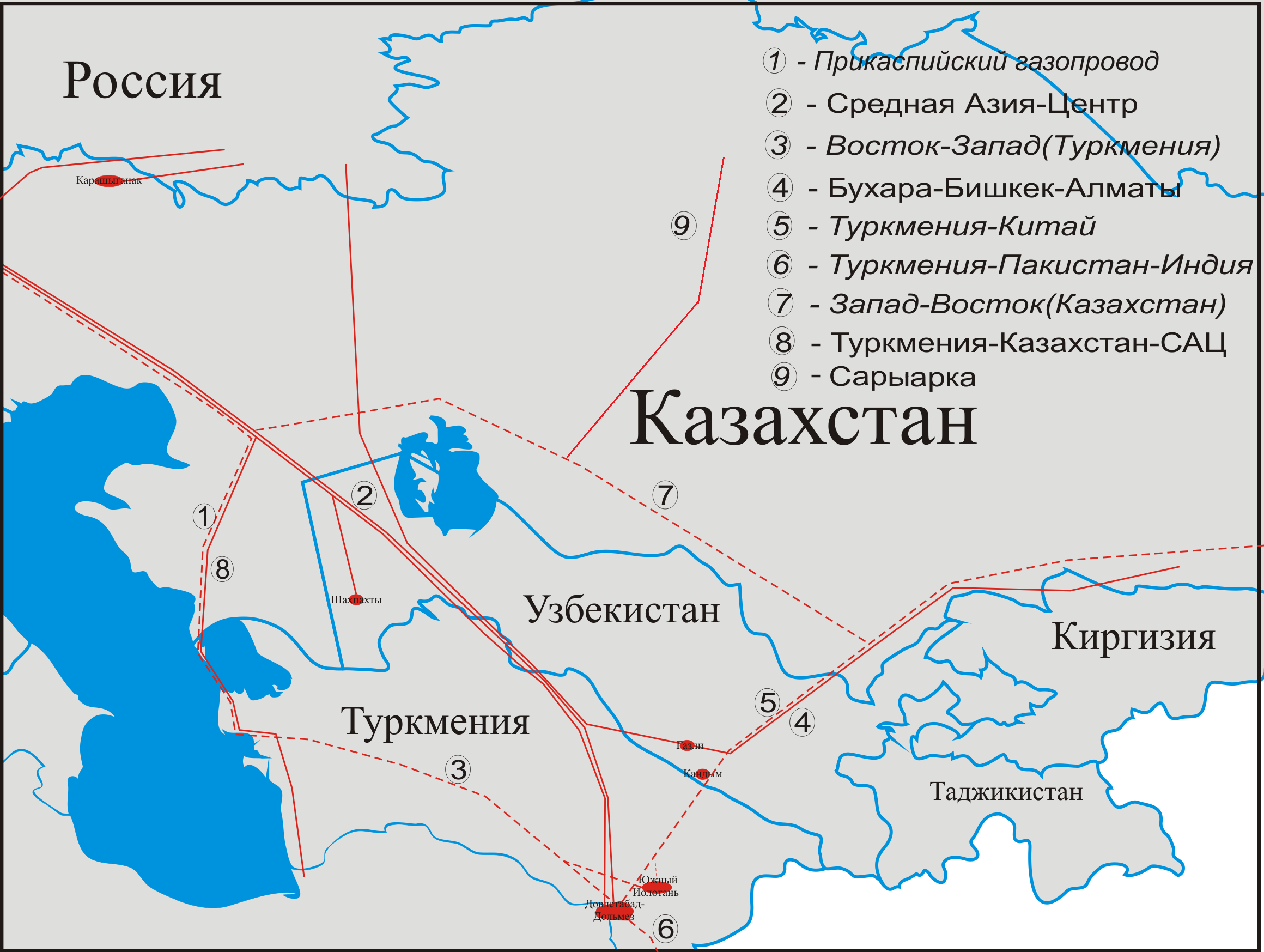
- Location of Central Asia–Center gas pipeline system

Location
- Country: Turkmenistan, Uzbekistan, Kazakhstan, Russia
- Direction: south–north-east
- Start: Dauletabad gas field and Okarem, Turkmenistan
- Passes through: Shatlyk gas field, Khiva, Kungrad, Cheleken, Beyneu
- To: Alexandrov Gay, Russia
- Runs alongside: Amu Darya

General information
- Type: natural gas
- Partners: Gazprom; Türkmengaz; Uzbekneftegas; KazMunayGas
- Commissioned: 1969

Technical information
- Length: 2,000 km (1,200 mi)
- Maximum discharge: 90 billion cubic meters

The Central Asia – Center gas pipeline system is a Gazprom controlled system of natural gas pipelines, which run from Turkmenistan via Uzbekistan and Kazakhstan to Russia. The eastern branch includes the Central Asia – Center (CAC) 1, 2, 4 and 5 pipelines, which start from the south-eastern gas fields of Turkmenistan. The western branch consists of the CAC-3 pipeline and a project to build a new parallel Caspian pipeline. The western branch runs from the Caspian Sea coast of Turkmenistan to north. The branches meet in western Kazakhstan. From there the pipelines run to north where they are connected to the Russian natural gas pipeline system.

== History ==
The system was built between 1960 and 1988. Construction began after discovery of Turkmenistan's Dzharkak field in the Amu Darya Basin, and the first section of the pipeline was completed in 1960. CAC-1 and 2 were commissioned in 1969 and CAC-4 was commissioned in 1973. In 1976, two parallel lines were laid between Shatlyk compressor station and Khiva. CAC-5 was commissioned in 1985 and in 1986-88 the Dauletabad–Khiva line was connected. The western branch (CAC-3) was constructed in 1972–1975.

In 2003, the President of Turkmenistan Saparmurat Niyazov proposed to renovate existing systems and construct a new parallel pipeline to the western branch. On 12 May 2007, presidents Vladimir Putin of Russia, Nursultan Nazarbayev of Kazakhstan and Gurbanguly Berdimuhamedow of Turkmenistan signed a memorandum for renovation and expansion of the western branch of the pipeline. On 20 December 2007, Russia, Turkmenistan and Kazakhstan finalized agreement on construction of the Caspian Coastal Pipeline parallel to the existing CAC-3 pipeline (known as Bekdash–Europe pipeline or Okarem–Beineu pipeline).

On 19 December 2025 there was reported failure of the pipeline localized in the Volgograd region of the Russian Federation. The official reason given was "ground subsidence" while Ukraine DIU (HUR) claimed act of sabotage.

== Technical features ==
Almost all Uzbek and Turkmen natural gas is delivered through the CAC pipeline system, mainly through the eastern branch due to location of production sites and poor technical condition of the western branch. CAC-1, 2, 4 and 5 pipelines are supplied from gas fields in the South-East of Turkmenistan, mainly from the Dauletabad gas field. The eastern branch starts from the Dauletabad field and continues through the Shatlyk gas field east of Tejen to Khiva, Uzbekistan. From there the pipeline system transports gas north-west along Amu Darya to the Kungrad compressor station in Uzbekistan. From Kungrad, most of the gas is carried via Kazakhstan to the Alexandrov Gay gas metering station in Russia. At Alexandrov Gay CAC pipelines meet with Soyuz and Orenburg–Novopskov pipelines. From there two lines run northwest to Moscow, and two others proceed across the Volga river to the North Caucasus-Moscow transmission system. The diameter of most pipelines varies from 1,020 to 1,420 millimetres (40 to 56 in). Current capacity of the system is 44 billion cubic meters (bcm) per year. An agreement is in place to increase capacity to 55 bcm per year by 2010 and through modernization there is potential to increase capacity to 90 bcm per year.

The western branch originates at Okarem near the Turkmenistan–Iran border and runs north. It is supplied by gas from fields scattered along the Caspian coast between Okarem and Balkanabat. It continues via Uzen in Kazakhstan to the Beyneu compressor station, where it meets the eastern branch of the CAC. South of Hazar, the western system consists of 710 millimetres (30 in) diameter pipeline, and between Hazar and Beyneu 1,220 millimetres (50 in) diameter pipeline.

== Caspian coastal pipeline ==
On 20 December 2007, Russia, Turkmenistan and Kazakhstan agreed to construct a new Caspian pipeline parallel to the existing CAC-3 pipeline. The pipeline is planned be built between Belek compressor station in Turkmenistan and Alexandrov Gay compressor station. Capacity of the new pipeline will be 20–30 bcm per year and it would be supplied from the planned East–West pipeline. Construction of the pipeline was to start in the second half of 2009. However, the project was mothballed.

== See also ==
- Central Asia–China gas pipeline
- Bukhara–Tashkent–Bishkek–Almaty pipeline
- Trans-Caspian Gas Pipeline
- Kazakhstan–China oil pipeline
