= Galkynyş Gas Field =

Large natural gas field near Ýolöten in Mary Province of Turkmenistan

- Location within Turkmenistan
- Country: Turkmenistan
- Region: Mary Province
- Offshore/onshore: Onshore
- Coordinates: 37.3014°N 62.3586°E
- Operator: Türkmengaz

Field history
- Discovery: 2006

Production
- Estimated gas in place: 14,000×10^{9} m^{3} (490×10^{12} cu ft)
- Recoverable gas: 2,800×10^{9} m^{3} (99×10^{12} cu ft)

The Galkynyş Gas Field, formerly known as Ýolöten gas field or South Ýolöten – Osman field, is a large natural gas field near Ýolöten, Mary Province, Turkmenistan. It is the world's second-largest gas field.

== History ==
The discovery of the gas field was announced on 2 November 2006. Late Turkmen president Saparmyrat Nyýazow invited Chinese CNPC and Turkish Çalik Enerji to participate in the exploration and development of the Ýolöten field. In 2008, the gas field was audited by Gaffney, Cline & Associates (GCA). According to GCA, Galkynyş is five times larger than the Döwletabat gas field and the fourth- or fifth-largest gas field in the world.

In December 2009, the contracts to develop the field were awarded to CNPC, Hyundai Engineering and Petrofac.

In November 2011, the field was renamed as Galkynyş. Production started in September 2013.

== Description ==
The gas field ranks among the world's five largest with estimated reserves of between 4 and 14 trillion cubic metres (140×10^{12} and 490×10^{12} cu ft) of natural gas and proven commercial reserves of 2.8 trillion cubic metres (99×10^{12} cu ft). It lies on 2,700 square kilometres (1,000 sq mi) zone of 90 kilometres (56 mi) in length and 30 kilometres (19 mi) in width at a depth of 3,900 to 5,100 metres (12,800 to 16,700 ft). Galkynyş consists of Ýolöten, Minara, Osman and Ýaşlar fields. Other nearby gas areas are Günorta Garaköl, Garaköl, Jürji, Gazanly, Gündogar Ýolöten and Günbatar Ýandakly.

Oil reserves are 300 million tons. The crude oil extracted at Galkynyş is transported to the Seýdi Oil Refinery.

== Development ==
The field is developed by Türkmengaz. CNPC, Hyundai Engineering and Petrofac built gas processing plants.
