= Novouzensky District =

Novouzensky District Новоузенский район (Russian)
- District
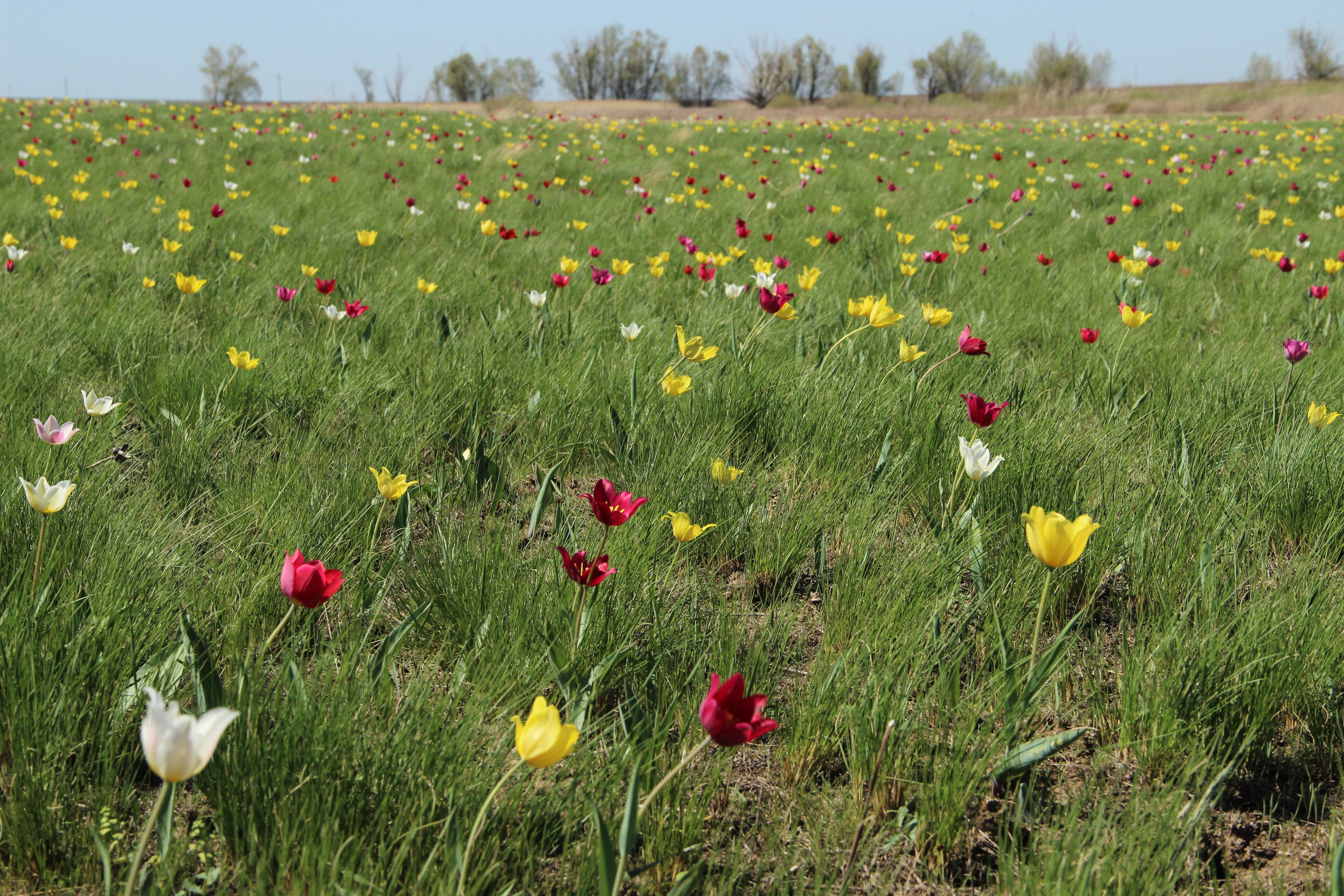
- Tulip steppe, Nuvouzensky District

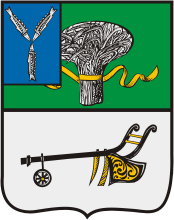
- Coat of arms
- Location of Novouzensky District in Saratov Oblast
- Coordinates: 50°27′N 48°09′E
- Country: Russia
- Federal subject: Saratov Oblast
- Established: 1928
- Administrative center: Novouzensk

Area
  - Total: 4,100 km^{2} (1,600 sq mi)

Population (2010 Census)
  - Total: 32,248
  - Density: 7.9/km^{2} (20/sq mi)
  - Urban: 52.8%
  - Rural: 47.2%

Administrative structure
  - Inhabited localities: 1 cities/towns, 81 rural localities

Municipal structure
  - Municipally incorporated as: Novouzensky Municipal District
  - Municipal divisions: 1 urban settlements, 10 rural settlements
- Time zone: UTC+4 (MSK+1)
- OKTMO ID: 63630000
- Website: http://www.novouzensk.ru

Population of Novouzensky District
- 2010 Census: 32,248
- 2002 Census: 33,960
- 1989 Census: 33,423
- 1979 Census: 31,102

Novouzensky District (Russian: Новоузе́нский райо́н) is an administrative and municipal district (raion), one of the thirty-eight in Saratov Oblast, Russia. It is located in the southeast of the oblast. The area of the district is 4,100 square kilometers (1,600 sq mi). Its administrative center is the town of Novouzensk. As of the 2010 Census, the total population of the district was 32,248, with the population of Novouzensk accounting for 52.8% of that number.

== History ==
The district was established in 1928 within Pugachyov Okrug of Lower Volga Krai. When okrugs were abolished in 1930, it was subordinated directly to Lower Volga Krai. In 1934, when Lower Volga Krai was split into Saratov and Stalingrad Krais, the district remained a part of the former. In 1936, Saratov Krai was transformed into modern Saratov Oblast, and the district has remained a part of it ever since.
