= Novouzensk =

Town in Saratov Oblast, Russia

Novouzensk Новоузенск
- Town
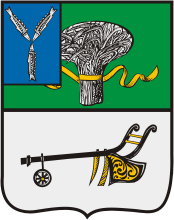
- Coat of arms
- Interactive map of Novouzensk
- Location of Novouzensk Novouzensk (Saratov Oblast)
- Coordinates: 50°28′N 48°08′E
- Country: Russia
- Federal subject: Saratov Oblast
- Administrative district: Novouzensky District
- Founded: 1760
- Town status since: 1835
- Elevation: 25 m (82 ft)

Population (2010 Census)
  - Total: 17,011
  - Estimate (2025): 14,813 (−12.9%)

Administrative status
  - Capital of: Novouzensky District

Municipal status
  - Municipal district: Novouzensky Municipal District
  - Urban settlement: Novouzensk Urban Settlement
  - Capital of: Novouzensky Municipal District, Novouzensk Urban Settlement
- Time zone: UTC+4 (MSK+1)
- Postal code: 413360–413362
- Dialing code: +7 84562
- OKTMO ID: 63630101001

Novouzensk (Russian: Новоузе́нск, IPA: [nəvəʊˈzʲensk]) is a town and the administrative center of Novouzensky District of Saratov Oblast, Russia, located on the left bank of the Bolshoy Uzen River at its confluence with the Chertanly River, 202 kilometers (126 mi) southeast of Saratov, the administrative center of the oblast. Population: 17,011 (2010 census); 16,881 (2002 census); 16,589 (1989 Soviet census).

== History ==
In 1760, the village of Chertanla (Чертанла) was founded by the Old Believers. It grew and was granted town status and renamed Novy Uzen (Новый Узень) in 1835. It was later renamed Novouzensk.

== Administrative and municipal status ==
Within the framework of administrative divisions, Novouzensk serves as the administrative center of Novouzensky District, to which it is directly subordinated. As a municipal division, the town of Novouzensk, together with seven rural localities, is incorporated within Novouzensky Municipal District as Novouzensk Urban Settlement.

== Economy ==
Novouzensk is a center of a grain-producing region.

== Attractions ==
A branch of the Saratov Museum of Local Lore operates in Novouzensk.

In Novouzensk, on June 8, 1910, Doctor of Veterinary Sciences, Professor Nikolai Mikhailovich Komarov, who graduated from the Saratov Veterinary Institute, was born. The author, the developer of the “mobile disinfection unit”, later called the Komarov Disinfection Unit, copyright certificate No. 68359, 1947. It has been produced since 1950 to the present and is known to all veterinarians under the abbreviation DUK. Komarov N. M. dealt with the problems of air ionization in agriculture, developing the ideas of Chizhevsky A. L. Under his leadership, the first All-Union Conference on artificial air ionization in animal husbandry was held. He worked on the problems of ventilation in livestock buildings, published the monograph "Ventilation in livestock buildings." One of the authors of the air ion ventilation unit. Under his leadership, 22 candidate and 3 doctoral dissertations were defended. He was Vice President of the International Society of Animal Hygienists. He has published more than 200 works on zoohygiene.
