= Alexandrov Gay =

Alexandrov Gai Александров Гай
- Selo
- Interactive map of Alexandrov Gai
- Location of Alexandrov Gai Alexandrov Gai (Saratov Oblast)
- Coordinates: 50°08′N 48°33′E
- Country: Russia
- Federal subject: Saratov Oblast
- Administrative district: Alexandrovo-Gaysky District
- Founded: 1762
- Elevation: 21 m (69 ft)

Population (2010 Census)
  - Total: 9,728
  - Estimate (2021): 8,772 (−9.8%)

Administrative status
  - Capital of: Alexandrovo-Gaysky District
- Time zone: UTC+4 (MSK+1)
- Postal code: 413370—413372
- OKTMO ID: 63602401101

Alexandrov Gay (Russian: Алекса́ндров Гай; Kazakh: Алғай, Alğai) is a rural locality (a selo) and the administrative center of Alexandrovo-Gaysky District of Saratov Oblast, Russia, located near the Russo-Kazakh border. Its population was 9,728 (2010 census); 9,993 (2002 census); 9,611 (1989 Soviet census).

== History ==
It was founded in 1762.

== Economy ==
Alexandrov Gay is an entry point to Russia for natural gas trunklines from Central Asia (Central Asia-Center gas pipeline system) as also for the Russian natural gas export lines Soyuz and Orenburg–Novopskov.

== Climate ==
Alexandrov Gay experiences cold semi-arid climate (Köppen climate classification: BSk) with cold winters and hot summers. Precipitation is low throughout a year.

Climate data for Alexandrov Gay (1991–2020, extremes 1929–present)
Month	Jan	Feb	Mar	Apr	May	Jun	Jul	Aug	Sep	Oct	Nov	Dec	Year
Record high °C (°F)	9.1 (48.4)	11.2 (52.2)	21.9 (71.4)	33.0 (91.4)	38.4 (101.1)	43.7 (110.7)	43.5 (110.3)	43.8 (110.8)	38.4 (101.1)	31.3 (88.3)	20.1 (68.2)	10.0 (50.0)	43.8 (110.8)
Mean daily maximum °C (°F)	−5.3 (22.5)	−4.4 (24.1)	3.2 (37.8)	15.8 (60.4)	24.2 (75.6)	29.6 (85.3)	31.8 (89.2)	30.5 (86.9)	23.0 (73.4)	13.6 (56.5)	3.2 (37.8)	−3.4 (25.9)	13.5 (56.3)
Daily mean °C (°F)	−8.8 (16.2)	−8.7 (16.3)	−1.5 (29.3)	9.3 (48.7)	17.0 (62.6)	22.4 (72.3)	24.6 (76.3)	22.9 (73.2)	15.7 (60.3)	7.7 (45.9)	−0.7 (30.7)	−6.8 (19.8)	7.8 (46.0)
Mean daily minimum °C (°F)	−12.1 (10.2)	−12.3 (9.9)	−5.4 (22.3)	3.6 (38.5)	10.3 (50.5)	15.3 (59.5)	17.5 (63.5)	15.7 (60.3)	9.1 (48.4)	2.9 (37.2)	−3.8 (25.2)	−10 (14)	2.6 (36.7)
Record low °C (°F)	−39.9 (−39.8)	−39.4 (−38.9)	−33.5 (−28.3)	−17.6 (0.3)	−4.4 (24.1)	−0.9 (30.4)	5.3 (41.5)	3.6 (38.5)	−5.2 (22.6)	−15.2 (4.6)	−32.4 (−26.3)	−33.1 (−27.6)	−39.9 (−39.8)
Average precipitation mm (inches)	29 (1.1)	22 (0.9)	25 (1.0)	26 (1.0)	26 (1.0)	29 (1.1)	24 (0.9)	20 (0.8)	25 (1.0)	33 (1.3)	21 (0.8)	30 (1.2)	310 (12.2)
Average extreme snow depth cm (inches)	8 (3.1)	12 (4.7)	8 (3.1)	0 (0)	0 (0)	0 (0)	0 (0)	0 (0)	0 (0)	0 (0)	1 (0.4)	4 (1.6)	12 (4.7)
Average rainy days	4	3	5	9	9	9	7	7	8	9	8	5	84
Average snowy days	15	11	8	2	0	0	0	0	0	0	8	13	59
Average relative humidity (%)	86	84	83	66	56	52	52	52	59	73	86	87	70
Mean monthly sunshine hours	58	99	128	187	242	255	265	217	167	114	63	50	1,845
Source 1: Pogoda.ru.net
Source 2: NOAA (sun, 1961–1990)
