= Türkmengaz =

Turkmen national gas company

Türkmengaz State Concern
- Native name: "Türkmengaz" Döwlet Konserni
- Company type: State-owned
- Industry: Natural gas
- Founded: 1 July 1996
- Headquarters: Ashgabat, Turkmenistan
- Key people: Batyr Amanov (Chairman)
- Products: Natural gas
- Revenue: US$ 4.13 billion (Jan–Nov 2020)
- Number of employees: ≈20,000 (2020)
- Website: turkmengaz.gov.tm

Türkmengaz is the national gas company of Turkmenistan. It was established by a presidential decree reorganising parts of the former Ministry of Oil and Gas in July 1996. From January to November 2020, Türkmengaz had US$4.13bn in revenue. It is the largest gas company in Central Asia. The chairman of the company, with rank of minister of state, is Batyr Amangeldiýewiç Amanow.

In 2018, Türkmengaz opened the Kiyanly (Turkmen: Gyýanly) petrochemical complex for production of polymers. It has the capacity to produce 381,000 tonnes of polyethylene and 81,000 tonnes of polypropylene per year.

== See also ==
- Economy of Turkmenistan § Natural gas
- Malai Gas Field
- Türkmennebit

== Links ==
- Official web-site
