= George M. Keller =

American energy executive

- Born: George Matthew Keller; December 3, 1923; Kansas City, Missouri, U.S.
- Died: October 17, 2008 (aged 84); Palo Alto, California, U.S.
- Education: Massachusetts Institute of Technology
- Occupation: Business executive
- Known for: CEO of Chevron Corporation, 1981–1989
- Spouse: Ann Keller
- Children: 3

George Matthew Keller (December 3, 1923 – October 17, 2008) was an American business executive who led Chevron from 1981 to 1989. He is best known for orchestrating Chevron’s $13.2 billion acquisition of Gulf Oil in 1984, which at the time was the largest corporate merger in U.S. history.

== Early life and education ==
Keller was born in Kansas City, Missouri, and raised in Chicago by his aunt after his mother's early death. He became interested in science after visiting the 1933 Chicago World’s Fair. He served in the United States Army Air Corps during World War II (1943–1946), then earned a Bachelor of Science in chemical engineering from Massachusetts Institute of Technology in 1948.

== Career at Standard Oil / Chevron ==
Keller joined Standard Oil of California (SoCal) in 1948 as a refinery design engineer. He rose through various senior roles, becoming vice chairman in 1974 and CEO in 1981.

In 1984, Keller led SoCal's acquisition of Gulf Oil after a bidding war with financier T. Boone Pickens. The $13.2 billion deal significantly expanded Chevron’s oil reserves and global reach, and SoCal rebranded itself as Chevron. The merger established Chevron as one of the world’s leading oil companies.

Keller promoted decentralised management, encouraged innovation, and introduced one of the industry’s first in-house environmental departments. He reversed the company’s previous “no comment” media policy and emphasised transparent corporate communication.

== Controversies ==
=== Gulf Oil merger opposition ===
The Gulf acquisition drew scrutiny from Congress and the public over antitrust concerns. U.S. senators and state regulators debated its implications, though the deal eventually received Justice Department approval.

=== Environmental and safety issues ===
Chevron was seen as progressive under Keller in creating environmental initiatives, but internal reviews in the wake of the 1989 Exxon Valdez spill found the company lagged behind peers on certain safety investments.

== Retirement and philanthropy ==
Keller retired in January 1989 at the mandatory retirement age and was succeeded by Kenneth T. Derr. He later served on the boards of the Stanford Institute for Economic Policy Research, Notre Dame de Namur University, the American Petroleum Institute, and the Bay Area Council. He also co-founded the George M. and Adelaide M. Keller Foundation in 1990.

== Personal life ==
He was married to Ann Keller and had three children, including Pulitzer Prize-winning journalist Bill Keller. He enjoyed golf, family travel, and civic engagement.

== Death ==
Keller died on October 17, 2008, from complications following orthopedic surgery. Chevron praised him as “a true leader and visionary.”

== See also ==
- Chevron Corporation
- Gulf Oil
- Kenneth T. Derr
