= ExtraMile Convenience Stores =

American convenience store franchise

ExtraMile Current Logo
- ExtraMile's most recent logo with their rebranding
- Type: Logo

ExtraMile Convenience Stores LLC
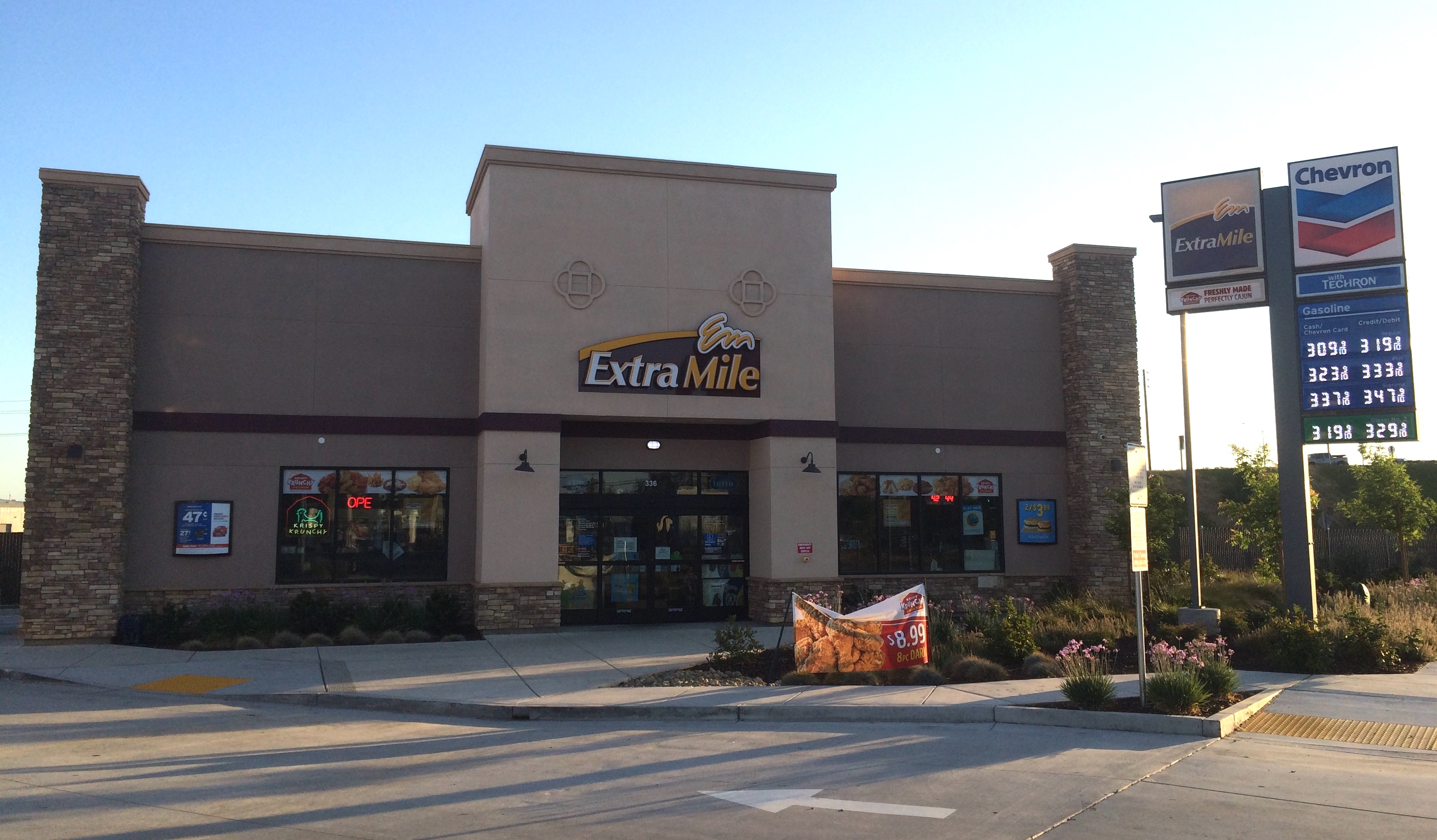
- ExtraMile in Ripon, California
- Type: Subsidiary
- Founded: February 1, 2018
- Number of locations: 1,100+ stores (2025)
- Area served: American West and Southwest
- Key people: Brian Sardelich (President)
- Services: Fuel and convenience retail

ExtraMile Convenience Stores LLC (ExtraMile) is an American convenience-store franchise. The company is jointly operated by Chevron U.S.A. Inc. and Jacksons Food Stores and operates primarily as a franchise brand at fuel-retail sites. ExtraMile locations are typically co-located with Chevron and Texaco service stations.

As of 2024, the company operated more than 1,000 locations across the west and southwest regions of the United States.

== History ==
ExtraMile was established on February 1, 2018, when Chevron U.S.A. and Jacksons Food Stores formed a joint venture to grow the ExtraMile brand across fuel-station convenience locations. Prior to the joint venture, the ExtraMile brand had been used in Chevron-and Texaco-branded fuel locations, primarily in California, Oregon and Washington. The company operates as a franchisor, with locations owned and operated by Chevron, Jacksons, and independent franchisees.

=== Location expansions ===
The company expanded through a combination of developing new stores and converting existing locations, with a goal of doubling locations by 2027. By 2021, the company reached 1,000 locations. The brand initially operated in the western United States before expanding into the southeast in 2021. The expansion goal was updated in June 2024, with the intended number of locations increasing from 1,100 to 2,000 by 2029.

=== Rebranding efforts ===
In 2019, ExtraMile went under rebranding efforts that refreshed the interior design of their store locations. The rebrand also introduced in-house branding for merchandise and a greater emphasis on food service. The same year, ExtraMile introduced a loyalty rewards program and delivery service.

By 2025, the company again refreshed their stores, modernizing both exterior storefronts and general brand imaging.

=== ExtraMile Arena and LAFC deal ===
In 2019, ExtraMile entered into an agreement with Boise State University to naming rights over the campus' indoor-arena. The deal was signed for 15 years, effectively renaming Taco Bell Arena to ExtraMile Arena.

In September 2020, ExtraMile partnered with the Los Angeles Football Club to become the "Official Convenience Store of LAFC."

== Community engagement ==
ExtraMile contributes to local communities through individual store-owned initiatives, regular charitable donations, and sponsorships for new stores. In July 2020, ExtraMile participated in 24/7 Day, an event hosted by the NACS Foundation to raise funds for and honor first responders and medical workers.

In 2021, ExtraMile celebrated the opening of their 1,000th location by donating $2,500 to the Vernon, Alabama high school band, cheerleading team, and other sports teams.
