= John S. Watson (Chevron CEO) =

American businessman (born 1956)

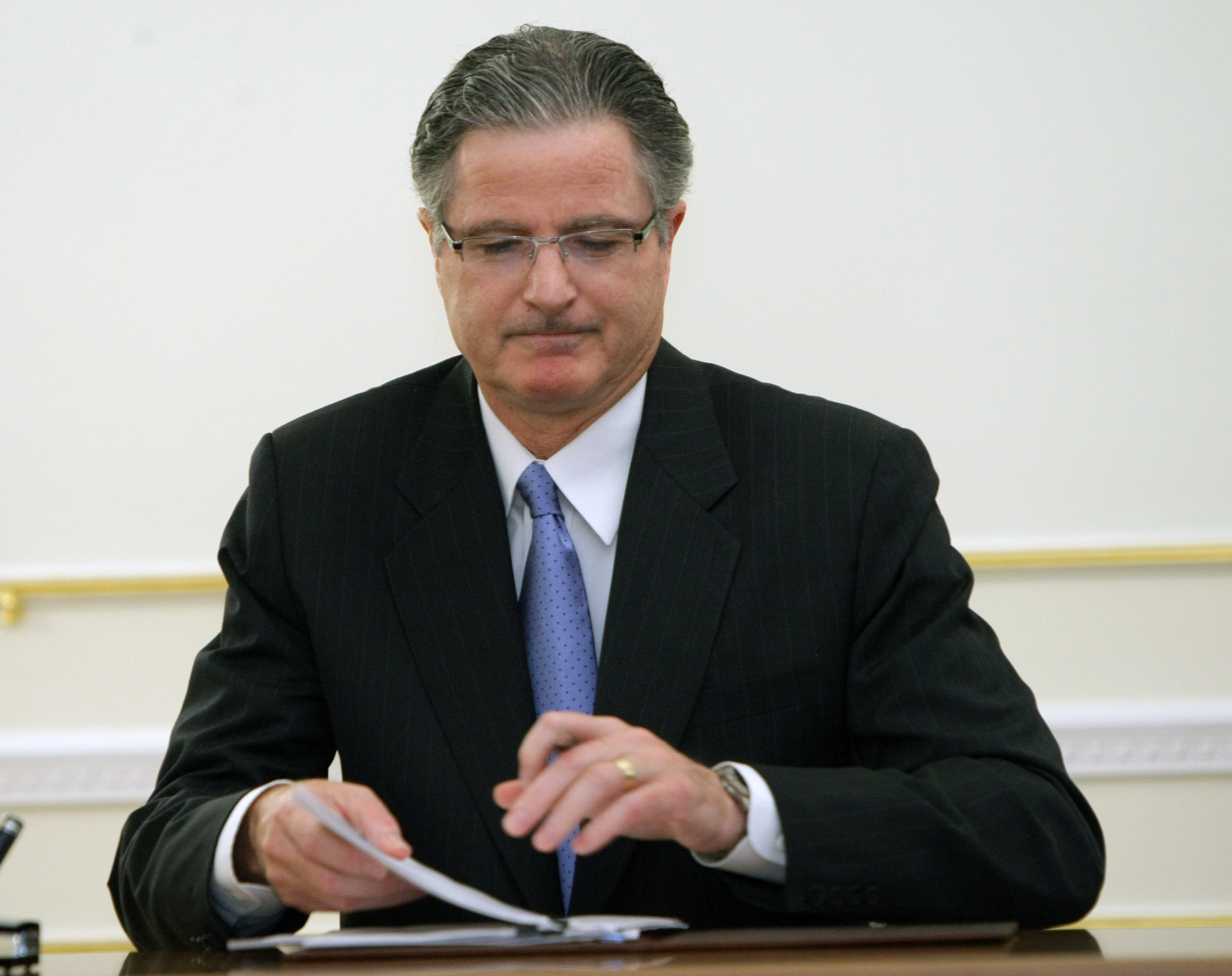
- Watson in June 2010
- Born: October 1956 (age 69–70)
- Education: University of California, Davis (BA); University of Chicago (MBA)
- Occupations: Former chairman and CEO of Chevron
- Predecessor: David J. O'Reilly
- Successor: Mike Wirth

John S. Watson (born October 1956) is an American businessman. He was the chief executive officer and chairman of the board of the Chevron Corporation from January 2010 to January 2018.

== Biography ==
John S. Watson was born in California in 1956. In 1978, he graduated with a B.A. in Agricultural Economics from the University of California, Davis, and in 1980 he received an MBA from the University of Chicago Booth School of Business.

In 1980, he joined the Chevron Corporation. He was its chief financial officer from 2001 to 2005. From 2009 to 2010, he was Vice-chairman of the board. From 2010 to 2018, he was chairman and CEO.

He also is chairman of the board of the American Petroleum Institute, on the board of directors of Caltex, Dynegy (2001–2004), the National Petroleum Council, the Business Council, the Business Roundtable, JPMorgan International Council, the American Society of Corporate Executives, and the Animal Rescue Foundation.
