= National Petroleum Council (US) =

American oil and gas advisory committee

National Petroleum Council (NPC)
- Formation: 1946
- Headquarters: Washington, D.C.
- Members: About 200
- Chair: Ryan Lance (ConocoPhillips)
- Vice Chair: Mike Wirth (Chevron Corporation)
- Executive Director: John Dabbar (ConocoPhillips)
- Website: npc.gov

The National Petroleum Council (NPC) is an American advisory committee representing oil and natural gas industry views to the United States Secretary of Energy.

== Purpose ==
According to its own statements, the NPC formulates recommendations for the U.S. Secretary of Energy, conducts in-depth studies on key energy policy issues, and brings together a cross-section of the energy community—voices from industry, academia, environmental protection, indigenous communities, and the public interest.

=== NPC Reports ===
The NPC prepares publicly available reports which are the result of studies conducted at the bequest of the Secretary of Energy by subject matter experts. Since its inception in 1946, the Council has prepared over 200 reports.

== History ==
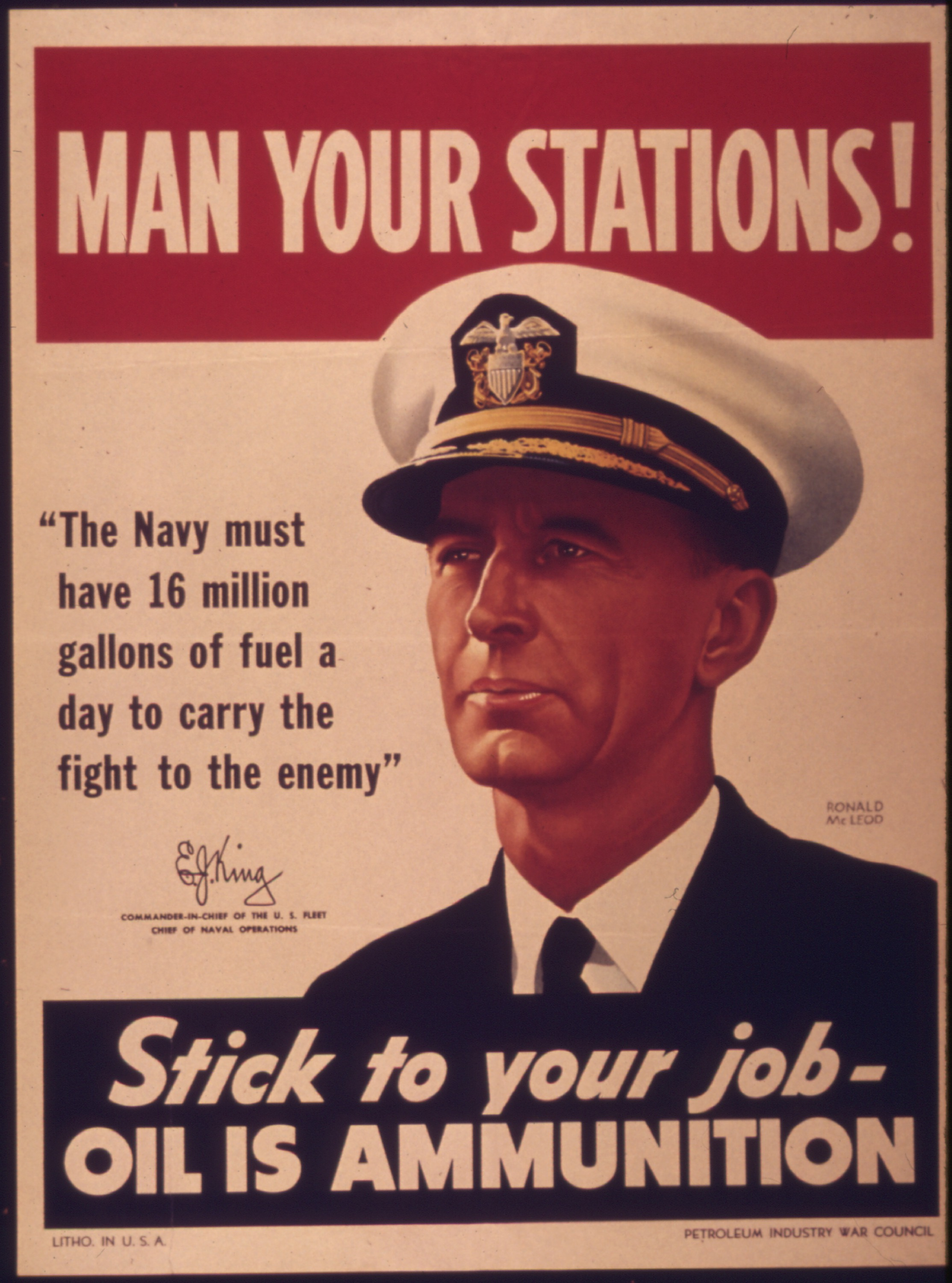
The message of this advertisement, which features Ernest J. King, is clear: oil is important. The ad's title is "Man your stations!" The National Petroleum Council (NPC) followed the wartime efforts of the U.S. industry and government. (1941 and 1945)

The councils origins date back to the collaboration between the U.S. government and U.S. industry during World War II. President Franklin D. Roosevelt appointed Harold L. Ickes as "Petroleum Coordinator for Defense," charging him with coordinating the supply of petroleum—specifically military fuels—which was of vital importance to the war effort. Ickes recognized the critical significance of petroleum and established the "Petroleum Industry War Council" with the following mandate:

...mobilize most effectively all resources and abilities of the petroleum industry to deal with the emergency conditions under which the industry must operate, and to provide a competent, responsible and representative body.

— Harold L. Ickes

Roosevelt's successor praised and acknowledged the close cooperation between government and industry after the end of World War II. Truman thus transformed the Petroleum Administration for War, no longer needed after the war, into a new organization with new responsibilities:

...steps should now be taken to assure coordination in peacetime of the Federal Government's many interests in petroleum, petroleum products, and associated hydrocarbons.

— Harry S. Truman, 1946

Thus, the council was established in 1946 at the request of President Harry S. Truman.

In 1977, its role was transferred to the (then) new Department of Energy (DOE), and the council is now formally chartered as Federal Advisory Committee with private funding.

== Committee ==
The NPC consists of about 200 members, organized and appointed by the Secretary of Energy. Individual members serve without compensation as representatives of their industry as a whole, not as lobbyists for specific companies. The committee is organized to reflect the geographic extent of the oil and gas industry while also covering all industry sectors and representing both large and small companies.

2018-2019 NPC members by company category
Category	No. of members
Integrated, Refining and Oil & Gas Production Companies: Integrated Companies and Independent Refiners (16); Larger Independent Producers (29); Smaller Independent Producers (25)	70
Midstream and Retail Oil & Gas Companies	32
Support Service Companies: Construction, Drilling, and Oilfield Services (24); Financial and Consultant Services (30)	54
Electric Companies and Other Large Consumers	13
Non-industry and Not-for-profit Members	34
Total	203

== Bibliography ==
- John W. Frey, H. Chandler Ide (1974), A History of the Petroleum Administration for War 1941-1945, Washington, D. C.: Government Printing Office
- Joseph A. Pratt, William H. Becker, William M. McClenahan, ed. (2002), Voice of the Marketplace: A History of the National Petroleum Council, Kenneth E. Montague Series in Oil and Business History, 13, College Station, TX: Texas A&M University Press, ISBN 978-1-58544-185-3

== See also ==
- Interstate Oil and Gas Compact Commission (IOGCC)
