= Ronald Sugar =

American business executive (born 1948)

Ronald D. Sugar
- Born: July 30, 1948 (age 78); Toronto, Ontario, Canada
- Education: University of California, Los Angeles (BSE, PhD)
- Occupations: Businessman; Chair & CEO at Northrop Grumman (2003–10)
- Predecessor: Kent Kresa
- Political party: Republican
- Board member of: Chevron Corp. (2005–); Apple Inc. (2010–); Uber Technologies Inc. (2018–); Ursa Major Technologies (2025–)

Ronald D. Sugar (born July 30, 1948) is a Canadian-American business executive. He was the chairman of the board and chief executive officer of Northrop Grumman Corporation from 2003 to 2009. In August 2018 he was elected as chairman of Uber.

== Early life ==
Ronald D. Sugar was born on July 30, 1948. He received a PhD in electrical engineering from UCLA in 1971 after he graduated summa cum laude in engineering from the University of California, Los Angeles, in 1968.

== Career ==
Sugar was the president and chief operating officer of TRW Aerospace and Information Systems. From 2000 to 2001, he was the president and chief operating officer of Litton Industries. He then was the president and chief operating officer of Northrop Grumman Corporation from 2001 to 2003, and chairman and CEO from 2003 to 2009. He was succeeded by Wesley G. Bush.

Sugar has been a director of Chevron Corporation since 2005 and Apple Inc. since 2010.

== Awards and honors ==
Sugar was elected a member of the National Academy of Engineering "for major contributions to advanced space communication systems and leadership in innovative aerospace programs".

== Philanthropy ==
He is a member of the board of trustees of the University of Southern California. Sugar has served on the President's Advisory Council of Break Through Cancer since 2024.
