= Chevron Lubricants Lanka =

Sri Lanka-based subsidiary of Chevron

Chevron Lubricants Lanka PLC
- Formerly: Lanka Lubricants; Caltex Lanka Lubricants
- Company type: Public
- Traded as: CSE: LLUB.N0000; S&P Sri Lanka 20 Index component
- ISIN: LK0290N00003
- Industry: Materials
- Founded: 1992; 33 years ago
- Headquarters: Colombo, Sri Lanka
- Key people: N. M. Shamsuddin (Chairman); Bertram Paul (CEO)
- Revenue: ▲LKR24.575 billion (2022)
- Operating income: ▲LKR7.496 billion (2022)
- Net income: ▼LKR3.666 billion (2022)
- Total assets: ▲LKR13.037 billion (2022)
- Total equity: ▲LKR6.159 billion (2022)
- Owner: Chevron Ceylon Limited (51.00%)
- Number of employees: 73 (2022)
- Website: chevron.lk

Chevron Lubricants Lanka PLC is a manufacturer, distributor, and marketer of Petroleum-based lubricants in Sri Lanka. The company is one of the constituents of the S&P Sri Lanka 20 Index and the Chevron Corporation holds a controlling stake (51.00%) of the company's stocks. The company offers engine oils, gear oils, transmission oils under the brand name Havoline while offering diesel vehicle engine oils, industrial lubricants, coolants, brake fluids under the brand name Delo. For the financial year 2019/20, Chevron Lubricants Lanka was ranked 67th in LMD 100, a list of listed companies by revenue in Sri Lanka.

== History ==
The company was incorporated as Lanka Lubricants on 1 December 1992 as a subsidiary of Ceylon Petroleum Corporation. In July 1994, Ceylon Petroleum Corporation, the Government of Sri Lanka and Caltex Petroleum Corporation signed a memorandum of understanding to transfer a controlling stake to Caltex. In 1996, the company was listed on the Colombo Stock Exchange. In 2007, the company was renamed Chevron Lubricants Lanka Ltd from Caltex Lubricants Lanka. The renaming was done in connection with the global branding and to clarify the organisation's identity.

== Operations ==
Muhammad Najam Shamsuddin was appointed as the new managing director/CEO of the company in September 2020 after Patrick McCloud resigned from the position. Kishu Gomes is the former managing director/CEO of the company and after 22 years of service quit the post in 2018. In the third quarter of 2020, despite the effects of the COVID-19 pandemic sales of the company rose compared to the second of the year and the third quarter of 2019. Chevron Lubricants Lanka operates a blending plant in Sapugaskanda. Brand Finance ranked Caltex 72nd in the 100 most valuable brands in Sri Lanka. During the prevalent economic crisis, Sri Lanka's lubricant market shrunk by 47% year-on-year basis in 2023. However, Chevron Lubricants retained the market leader position.

== See also ==
- List of companies listed on the Colombo Stock Exchange
- List of Sri Lankan public corporations by market capitalisation
