= Chevron Solarmine =

Solar photovoltaic power system in California, U.S.

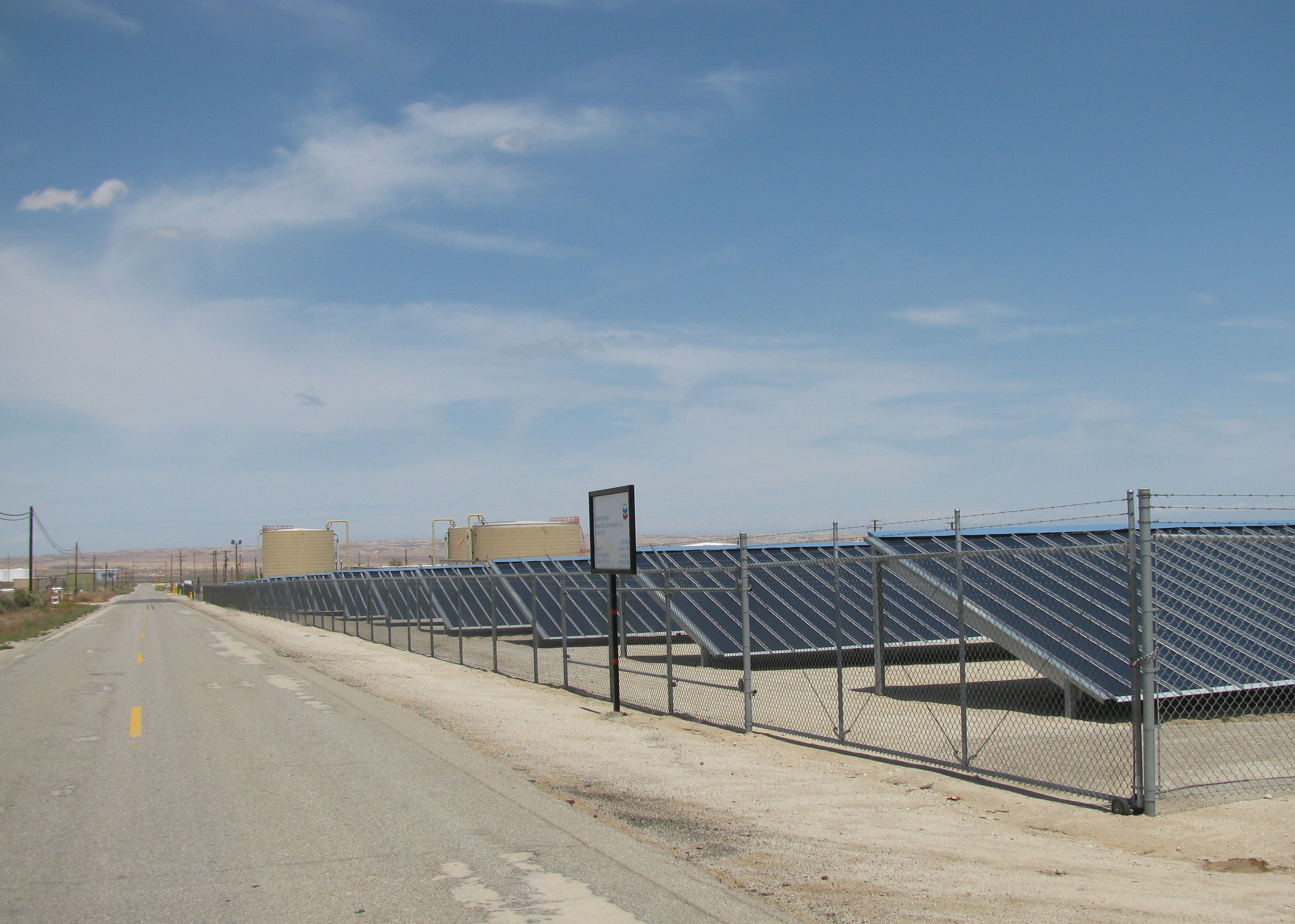
- Chevron Solarmine System
- Country: United States
- Location: Fellows, California
- Coordinates: 35°11′1.6″N 119°32′22.4″W
- Status: Operating
- Owner: Chevron Corporation
- Operator: Chevron Corporation

Solar farm
- Type: Flat-panel PV
- Site area: 6 acres

Power generation
- Units operational: 500 kW
- Nameplate capacity: 500 kW AC
- Annual net output: 900,000 kWh AC

At the time of commissioning in 2003, the 500 kW Chevron Solarmine solar photovoltaic (PV) system was the world's largest thin-film amorphous silicon solar PV system and one of the largest solar PV systems in the United States. Located at the Midway-Sunset Oil Field, Solarmine was the first solar PV system in California to power oil field operations.

== System ==
ChevronTexaco and United Solar Systems Corporation (Uni-Solar) collaborated on the design and installation of Solarmine. At the time of commissioning in 2003, the 500 kW Chevron Solarmine solar photovoltaic (PV) system was the world's largest thin-film amorphous silicon solar PV system and one of the largest solar PV systems in the United States. Located at the Midway-Sunset Oil Field, Solarmine was the first solar PV system in California to power oil field operations.

The building block for the solar PV system is a Uni-Solar PV Laminate (Model PVL-128) that is about 1.3 feet wide by 18 feet long, providing 128 Watts DC. The PV laminates have good performance in cloudy weather because they are designed to be less dependent on infrared light. In addition, the PV laminates have increased tolerance to higher temperatures, shadows, and soiling.

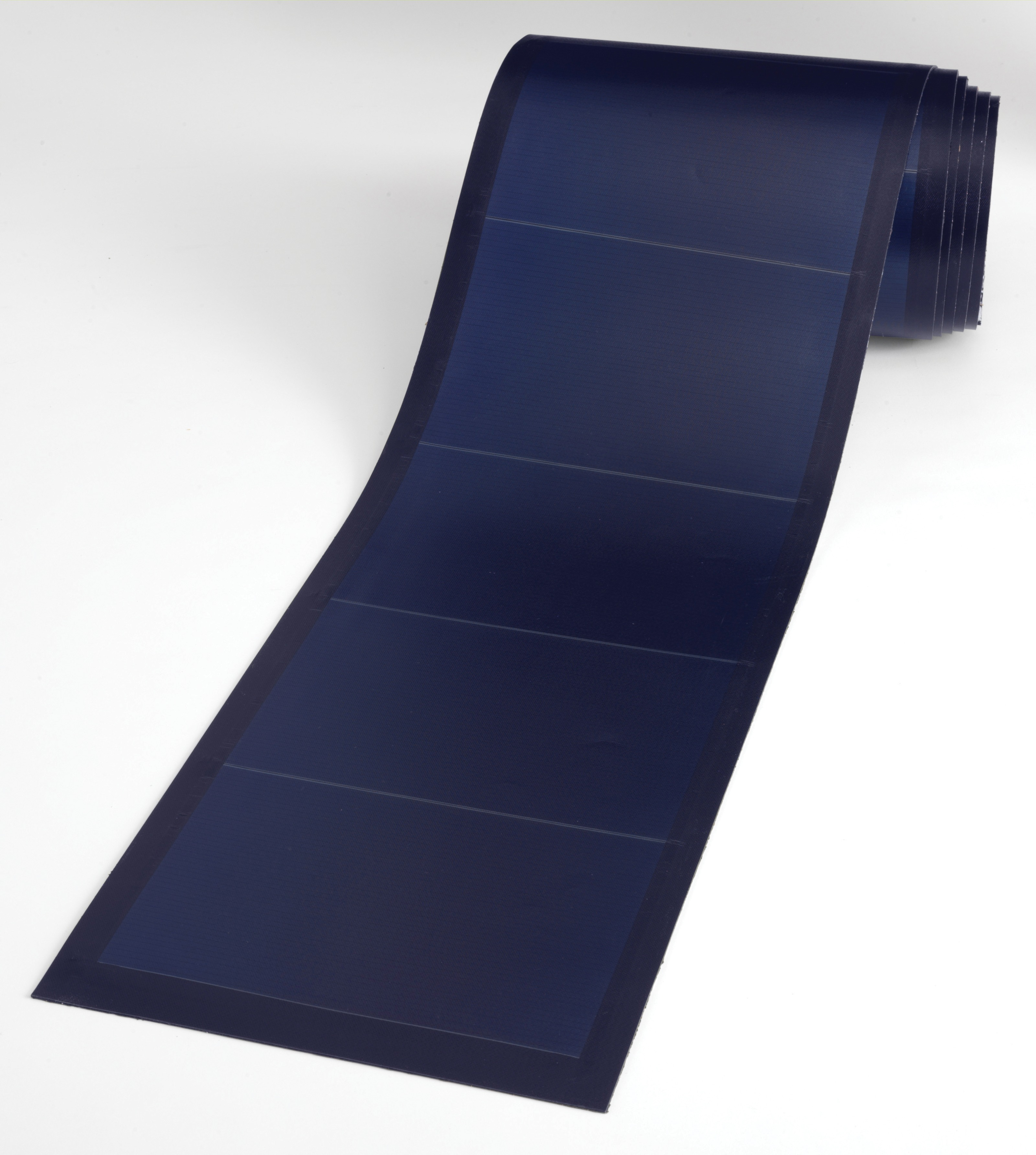
Solar PV Laminate Manufactured by United Solar Ovonic

The PV laminates are adhered to standing seam metal roof panels which are then attached to ground-mounted metal racks at 20 degree angles. The PV laminates are electrically wired in series so that there are twelve 128 Watt PV laminates per string and the overall system has 400 strings, composed of 4,800 PV laminates, for a total of 614 kW DC. The DC power output from the PV laminates is fed into combiner boxes and then two grid-tied inverters, one at 225 kW and the other at 300 kW. The inverter output is fed into three-phase isolation transformers. The system is connected to the local distribution grid.

== Technology ==
The PV laminates were manufactured using a roll-to-roll vapor deposition process that used less than 1/300th the amount of silicon material normally used in standard crystalline silicon solar cells. There were three semiconductor layers deposited onto a 5-mil thick sheet of stainless steel. The PV laminates are capable of capturing a greater percentage of incident light, which provides higher efficiencies and higher energy outputs, especially at lower irradiation levels and at low light. In order to maintain the series circuit when the PV laminates are shaded or covered by dirt or dust, bypass diodes are installed across each solar PV cell. The degradation of amorphous silicon PV panels have been evaluated at test labs globally and the annual degradation rate is approximately 0.87% power degradation.

== Operations ==
Solarmine generates about 900,000 kWh AC of electrical energy annually and is used for oilfield operations. The operation of the system provided some important insights regarding system design, especially the assumptions used for estimating the system and conversion losses in going from DC to AC, including the losses due to interconnection, string mismatch, inverter, soiling, and thermal. The original expected power was 490 kW AC, but due to the lower than expected losses, the system can provide regular output in excess of 500 kW AC. After the first two years of operation, the system was determined to be able to deliver and exceed the annual energy production needed in order to provide required rate of return for the project economics.

A data acquisition system has been collecting data from the site since July 2003 and data analysis has provided quantifications of system performance, as well as the effects of inverter breakdowns and soiling due to the dusty environment.

Data analysis for 2008 system operations showed that the annual energy yield was 1653 kWh/kWp, which was aligned with predicted performance using the available solar calculators at the time for thin-film solar PV products.

In 2009, the Milken Institute completed an analysis about the impact of Chevron on the California economy and Solarmine was mentioned as the first solar PV system in California to power oil field operations.

At the 21st Joint Global Climate Change-Japan Environment Symposium in 2013, Solarmine was featured as a renewable energy system used in the petroleum industry since 2003.

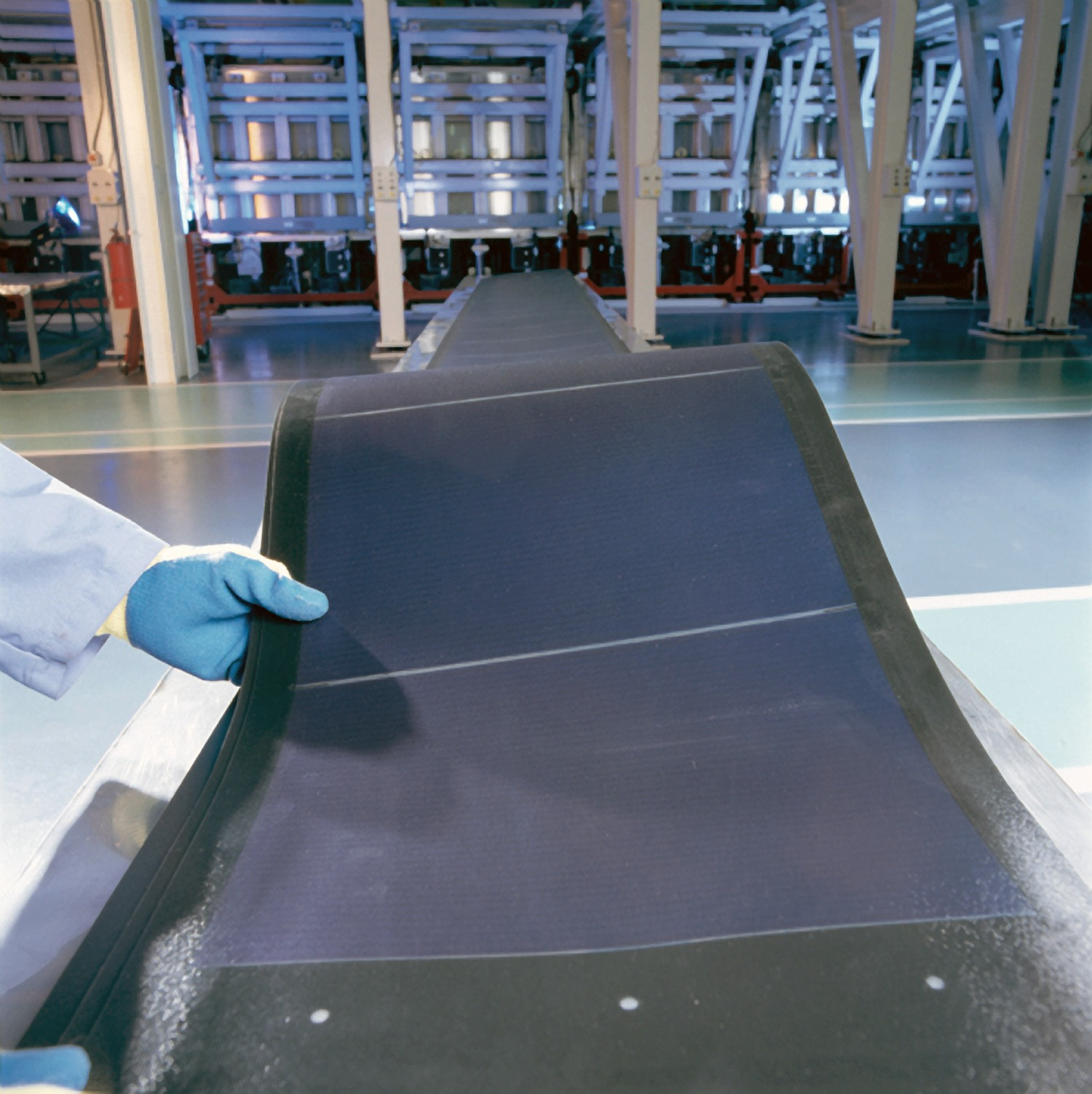
Thin-film PV laminate product

Monthly Energy Yields (kWh/kWp) for 2008
Month	Energy Yield (kWh/kWp)
January	71.3
February	109.5
March	153.0
April	176.4
May	174.5
June	188.9
July	183.9
August	179.7
September	153.6
October	123.6
November	87.8
December	51.0
Annual Total	1653
