= Inter-Con Security =

American security services firm

Inter-Con Security Systems, Inc.
- Type: Private Company
- Industry: Security services Consulting; Professional Services
- Founded: Alhambra, California (1973)
- Headquarters: Pasadena, California
- Area served: Worldwide
- Key people: Enrique Hernandez (Founder) Enrique Hernandez Jr. (Executive Chairman) Henry Hernandez (President & CEO)
- Services: Security guards and account management, executive protection programs, risk assessments, fire life safety and emergency response, screening and access control, and classified information safeguarding and investigations.
- Number of employees: more than 40,000
- Website: http://www.icsecurity.com/

Inter-Con Security Systems, Inc. is an American multinational security services company headquartered in Pasadena, California. Inter-Con is one of the largest private security companies in the world with over 40,000 employees across North America, South America and Africa. The company offers security personnel and management, executive protection programs, risk assessments, tactical exercise plans and programs, emergency medical services, classified information safeguarding and investigations.

== History ==
Inter-Con Security Systems, Inc. was founded in 1973 with the goal of developing and implementing comprehensive security programs custom tailored to its clients' needs. Retired Los Angeles Police Department (LAPD) Detective Enrique "Hank" Hernandez and his wife Bertha Hernandez founded Inter-Con in Alhambra, California in 1973. Since 1986, his son, Enrique Hernandez, Jr., has been president and Chief Executive Officer. It remains a privately owned company.

The company's first customer was the U.S. National Aeronautics and Space Administration (NASA) to implement a security program incorporating a variety of security disciplines in a classified environment.

In March 2025, the United States Institute of Peace (USIP) cancelled a contract with Inter-Con amidst a dispute with the Department of Government Efficiency (DOGE). USIP was concerned that Inter-Con would allow DOGE members access to the USIP headquarters, as Inter-Con's federal contracts could be leveraged to force their cooperation with DOGE. After the contract was cancelled, Inter-Con staff used a physical key that had been issued and not returned to assist DOGE personnel in entering the building and seizing USIP security personnel and weapons. According to sworn testimony from USIP head of security Colin O'Brien, "DOGE threatened to cancel every federal contract Inter-Con held" if they did not assist DOGE in accessing their former client's premises.

== Operations ==
Inter-Con's security services include physical security, program management, electronic security, security consulting and training, specialized services, active shooter response, and executive protection. The company's client list includes federal, state and local governments, multinational corporations, non-governmental organizations, public utilities, private businesses, hospitals, sports arenas, and high net worth individuals, among others. Internationally, Inter-Con is a provider of diplomatic security services, safeguarding United States Embassies, as well as other embassy locations around the world.

Key sectors served by Inter-Con include aerospace & defense, consumer goods & services, education, energy & utilities, financial, government & diplomatic, healthcare, manufacturing, natural materials & resources, and non-governmental organizations.

As of 2026, notable Inter-Con clients include the U.S. government, General Motors, Ford Motor Company, and Cargill.
