= Enrique Hernandez Jr. =

American lawyer and business executive (born 1955)

Enrique Hernandez
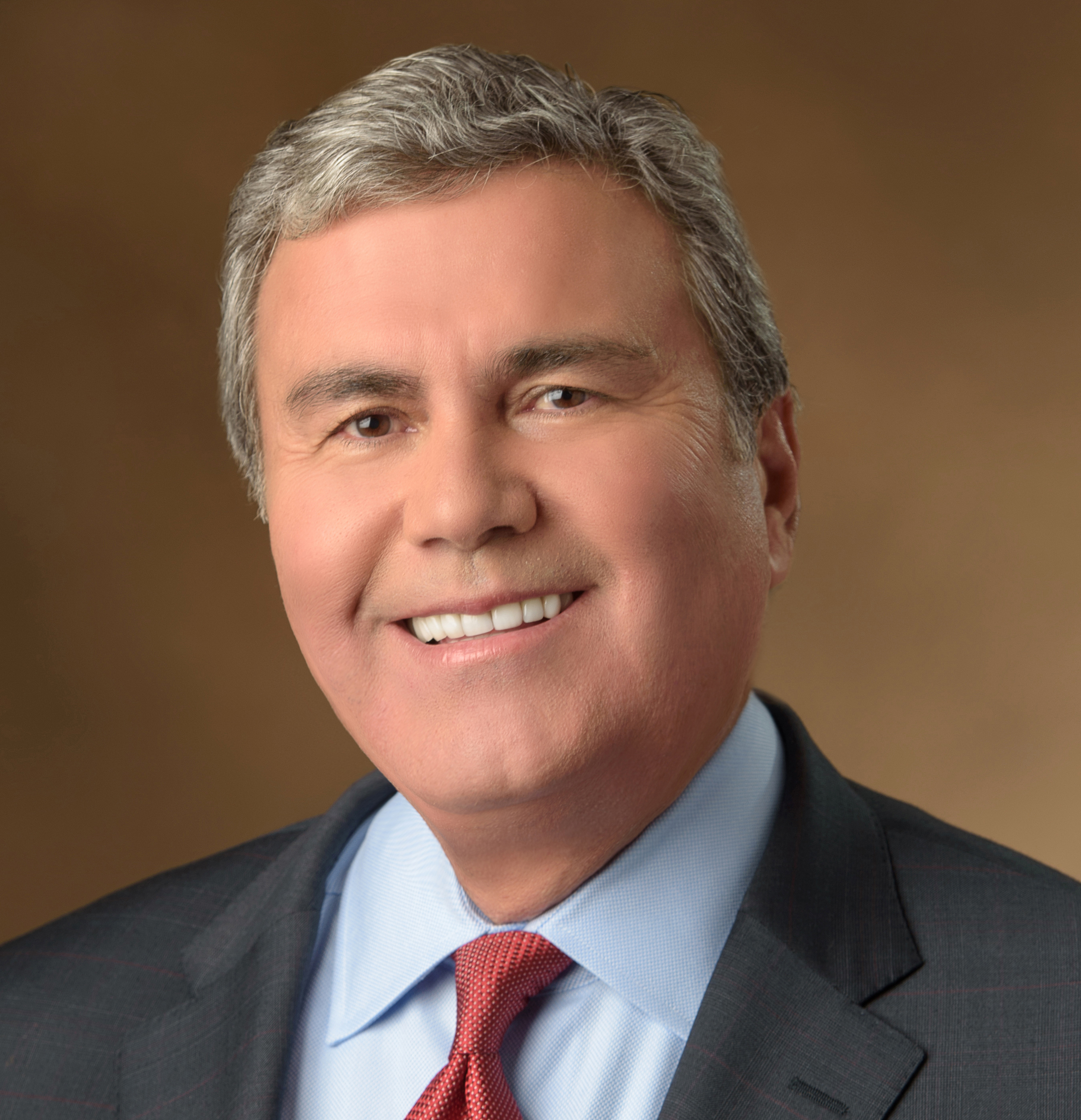
- Born: November 2, 1955 (age 69); Los Angeles, California, U.S.
- Education: Harvard University (BA, JD)
- Occupation: Businessman
- Spouse: Megan McLeod (m. 1982)
- Children: 5

Enrique Hernandez Jr. (born November 2, 1955) is an American lawyer and business executive. He is chief executive officer (CEO) of Inter-Con Security Systems, Inc., and a director of Wells Fargo & Company. He was the non-executive chairman of McDonald's from May 2016 to May 2024, and a director from 1996 to 2024.

== Early life and education ==
A native of Los Angeles, Hernandez graduated from Loyola High School in 1973. He received his BA degree in government and economics from Harvard University in 1977 and was recognized as a Harvard National Scholar. He received his JD degree from Harvard Law School in 1980.

== Career ==
He began to practice law with Brobeck, Pfleger and Harrison in Los Angeles in 1980.

Hernandez left Brobeck, Pfleger, and Harrison in 1984 to join his father at Inter-Con, which the elder Hernandez had founded after a career as Chief of the Los Angeles Police Department. His first position with Inter-Con, in 1984, was in the capacity of executive vice president and assistant general counsel. In 1986 he was elected president and chief executive officer. Under his leadership, Inter-Con has grown to be one of the largest security system providers worldwide, with 25,000 employees in North and South America, Europe, and Africa.

In 1993, Mayor Richard Riordan appointed Hernandez to the Los Angeles Police Commission, where he served as president through 1995.

He was elected a director of McDonald's Corporation in 1996, Nordstrom, Inc., in 1997, and Wells Fargo & Company in 2003. Hernandez was also a director of the Tribune Company from 2001 to 2007. He was elected chairman of Nordstrom in 2006. He is also chairman of the board of regents of Loyola High School, vice chairman of the Los Angeles County Museum of Art, vice chairman of the Children's Hospital Los Angeles Board of Trustees, a director of the California Health Care Foundation, a trustee of the University of Notre Dame and of Pomona College, and a member of the National Infrastructure Advisory Council, Harvard College Visiting Committee, and the Harvard University Resources Committee.

Hernandez retired as non-executive chairman of McDonald's in May 2024, with president and CEO Chris Kempczinski assuming the role.

== Personal life ==
On June 12, 1982, he married Megan Beth McLeod. The couple are the parents of five children. He is of Mexican-American descent.

In the political realm, he supported Richard Riordan's bid to become Governor of the State of California in 2002.
