= Climate appraisal =

A climate appraisal is a unique, location-based report for a specific property on climate change (from global warming) and other environmental risks. Information in a climate appraisal report enables property owners and/or buyers to assess for themselves how climate change risks could impact a specific property address in the future, probably by utilizing both historical and projected data from scientific modeling to display those potential risks.

A climate appraisal report may include historical and projected information in the following categories: shoreline reduction from sea level rise, risk from hurricanes, tornadoes, earthquakes, volcanoes, droughts, wildfires, floods, diseases, and industrial pollution. A report may integrate a wide range of environmental risk information after geocoding a location.

== Report providers ==
Climate Appraisal Services, LLC was launched in November 2006 in a partnership with University of Arizona scientists, with a mission to provide address-based climate reporting to property owners to enable a new channel of climate change communication. Climate Appraisal Services was reviewed in 2007 by USA Today in an article entitled "Website checks your home's climate change risk", as well as other media in 2007 including the journal Nature. Climate Appraisal Services, LLC ceased operations in October 2010 due to insufficient public interest in its reports to sustain continuing operations.
