= Mike Wirth =

American businessperson and CEO of Chevron (born 1960)

Michael Wirth
- Born: October 15, 1960 (age 65)
- Education: University of Colorado, Boulder (BS)
- Occupations: CEO, Chevron Corporation
- Predecessor: John S. Watson (Chevron CEO)

Michael K. Wirth (born October 15, 1960) is an American businessman who has been the chairman and CEO of Chevron Corporation since 2018. Previously, he was the vice chairman of the company.

== Early life ==
After graduating from high school, Wirth attended the University of Colorado, where he earned a bachelor's degree in chemical engineering in 1982. Wirth played football and basketball at school.

== Career ==
Wirth joined Chevron as a design engineer in 1982. He worked in multiple sectors including engineering, construction, and operations.In 2001 he became president of marketing for Chevron's Asia, Africa and Middle East region.

He has been on the board of directors for Caltex Australia and GS Caltex.

=== Chevron ===
In 2018, Wirth was widely speculated and eventually confirmed to succeed John S. Watson as CEO of Chevron. Wirth is a member of the board of the American Petroleum Institute, a trade group in the oil industry.

Wirth's company, Chevron, is responsible for one of the highest total carbon sequestration of any private company worldwide. Despite these practices, Wirth's company has been involved in several greenwashing tactics, and was found by a Federal Trade Commission to be misleading its customers on its efforts to reduce greenhouse gas emissions. In response to CNBC host Jim Cramer asking if Chevron had considered calls to invest in alternative energy, Wirth responded that Chevron would rather the money “go back to our shareholders and let them plant trees, go invest in a wind and solar developer and have the right to do that with a growing dividend that comes out of our company.”

In November 2025, Wirth attended a red carpet dinner at the White House for Saudi Crown Prince Mohammed bin Salman. Bin Salman, invited by President Donald Trump, was making his first visit to the United States since 2018.

== Personal life ==
Wirth and his wife have four adult children.

Wirth moved to Houston, Texas in 2024 as part of Chevron's corporate headquarters relocating to avoid high labor costs and other staffing issues in California.

Wirth typically is asleep by 10pm and wakes at 3.45am, when he does a 90 minute gym session.
