= Kenneth T. Derr =

American businessman (1936–2024)

- Born: Kenneth Tindall Derr; August 4, 1936; Wilkes-Barre, Pennsylvania, U.S.
- Died: July 12, 2024 (aged 87); Orinda, California, U.S.
- Education: Cornell University (BS, MBA)
- Occupation: Business executive
- Known for: CEO of Chevron Corporation
- Spouse: Donna Mettler (m. 1959)
- Children: 3

Kenneth Tindall Derr (August 4, 1936 – July 12, 2024) was an American business executive who served as chairman and chief executive officer (CEO) of Chevron Corporation from 1989 to 1999. He was known for leading Chevron’s global expansion in the Middle East with the merger of Gulf Corp.

== Early life and education ==
Derr was born in Wilkes-Barre, Pennsylvania. He earned a Bachelor of Science in mechanical engineering in 1959 and a Master of Business Administration in 1960, both from Cornell University.

== Career ==
=== Chevron Corporation ===
Derr joined Standard Oil of California (later Chevron) in 1960. He became its youngest ever vice president in 1972, president of Chevron U.S.A. in 1979, and a member of the board of directors in 1981. In 1985, he was appointed vice chairman and after managing Chevron's huge merger in the Middle East, became president of Chevron, succeeding, Donald L. Bower, in October 1 1979.

== Board memberships and affiliations ==
Derr served on the boards of Citigroup, AT&T, and Potlatch Corporation. He was chairman of the American Petroleum Institute and a trustee emeritus of Cornell University. He was a member of the Council on Foreign Relations and The Business Council.

== Personal life ==
Derr married Donna Mettler in 1959. The couple had three children, seven grandchildren, and two great-grandchildren. He lived in Orinda, California, and was a member of the San Francisco Golf Club and the Pacific-Union Club.

== Recognition ==
In 2019, Derr was awarded the Samuel C. Johnson Distinguished Service Award by Cornell University's Johnson School.

== Death ==
Kenneth T. Derr died at his home on July 12, 2024, at the age of 87.
