= Antonia Juhasz =

American journalist

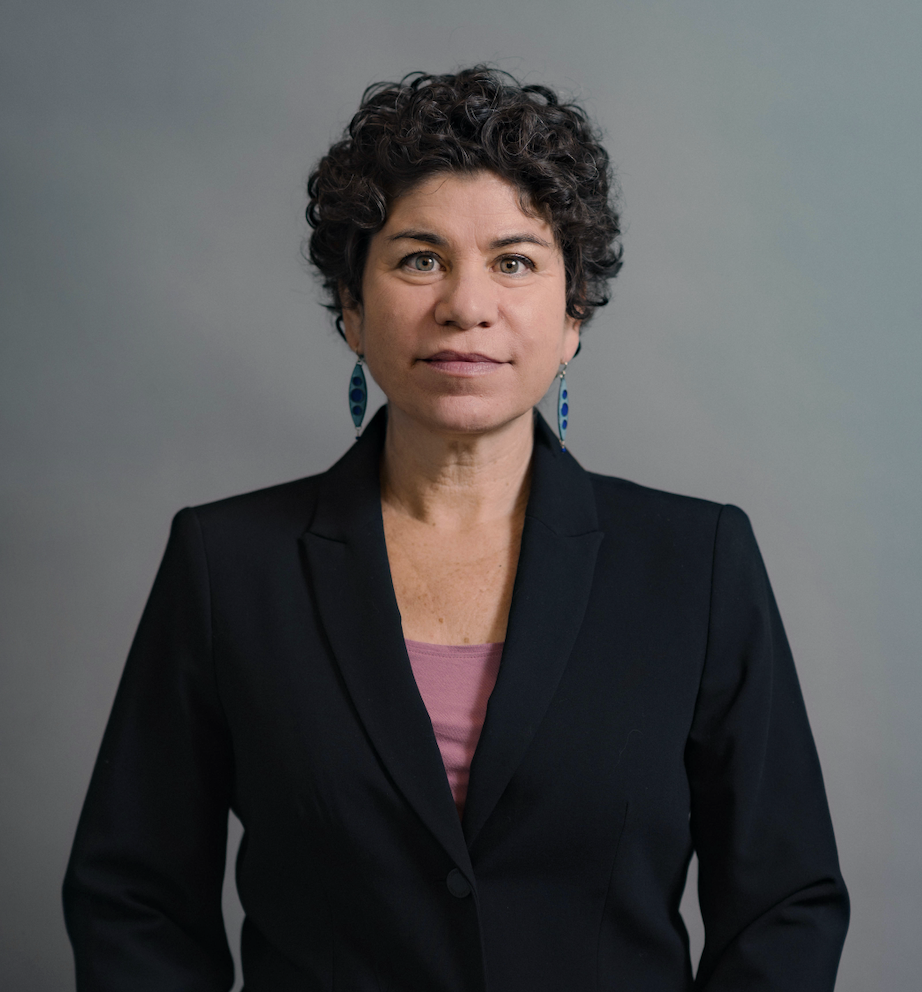
- Born: 1970 (age 55–56); Pennsylvania
- Occupations: Investigative journalist, lecturer and author
- Known for: Investigative journalism
- Website: http://www.antoniajuhasz.net/

Antonia Juhasz is an American investigative journalist, lecturer and author focusing on climate, energy, environmental justice, and fossil fuels. She is a longtime contributor to Rolling Stone, and her work has appeared in many other publications including the New York Times, National Geographic and Wired.

== Education ==
Juhasz earned an undergraduate degree in public policy at Brown University, and an M.A. in public policy from Georgetown University.

== Career ==
Juhasz was a 2012-2013 fellow at the Investigative Reporting Program, a working newsroom at the Graduate School of Journalism at the University of California, Berkeley, for which she traveled across northern Afghanistan investigating the role of oil and natural gas in the Afghanistan war. She was a Yale University Poynter fellow in journalism in 2017, a Ted Scripps fellow in environmental journalism at the University of Colorado Boulder in 2020, and a Bertha Challenge fellow in investigative journalism from the Bertha Foundation in 2021. She has been awarded numerous reporting grants such as a 2025 grant with the Fund for Investigative Journalism, to explore fossil fuel lobbying related to actions by the Trump administration, and a 2020 grant from the Society of Environmental Journalists' Fund for Environmental Journalism, to establish a radio series on the oil industry. Between 2022 and 2024 she was a senior researcher on fossil fuels, environment and human rights at Human Rights Watch in Washington, DC.

She has worked as a radio and podcast host for KGNU Radio in Boulder, Colorado, and KPFA Radio in Berkeley, California. She has lectured at the New York Museum of Modern Art, the Global Investigative Journalism Network, and Google among others. Her many media appearances include KQED's Forum, the Smithsonian documentary "Ten Steps to Disaster: Deepwater Horizon," Fresh Air with Terry Gross, the podcast Here's The Thing with Alec Baldwin, and Democracy Now! with Amy Goodman.

Juhasz was an adjunct lecturer at Tulane University in New Orleans, which also awarded her its Monroe Fellowship. She is a judge and mentor for various journalism organizations including the National Press Foundation and Report for America.

Juhasz worked as a legislative assistant in Washington, DC, for two U.S. members of Congress: John Conyers, Jr. (D-MI) and Elijah E. Cummings (D-MD).

== Writing ==
In addition to being a regular contributor to Rolling Stone for more than a decade, Juhasz has written for publications including National Geographic, Wired, CNN, Mother Jones, Harper’s Magazine, Newsweek, Los Angeles Times, Ms Magazine, The Nation, The Atlantic, The Guardian, Sierra Magazine, The New York Times and others.

She is the author of three books. Black Tide: The Devastating Impact of the Gulf Oil Spill (2011) examined the human impact of the Deepwater Horizon oil spill. The Tyranny of Oil: The World's Most Powerful Industry and What We Must Do To Stop It (2008) received the 2009 San Francisco Library Laureate Award. The Bush Agenda: Invading the World One Economy at a Time (2006) explored the development and application of the Bush administration's international economic agenda, with a focus on the oil industry and the role of oil in the Iraq War.

Juhasz has contributed chapters or essays to numerous other books, including the Harper's essay "Thirty Million Gallons Under the Sea," which appeared in The Gulf South: An Anthology of Environmental Writing (2021) and was featured in 2016's edition of The Best American Science and Nature Writing. Other contributions include "Defeating the Fossil Fuel Industry" in Not Too Late: Changing the Climate Story from Despair to Possibility (2023), and "Spill" in Fueling Culture: Energy, History, Politics (2017).
