= Jacksons Food Stores =

American chain of gas stations

- Type: Private
- Industry: Convenience stores
- Founded: 1975
- Founder: John D. Jackson
- Headquarters: Meridian, Idaho, U.S.
- Number of locations: 340
- Key people: Cory Jackson
- Products: Snacks, candy, soda/pop, beer, wine, spirits, fuel
- Website: www.jacksons.com

Jacksons Food Stores, commonly shortened to Jacksons, is an American chain of gas stations and convenience stores. There are approximately 340 stores located in the U.S. states of Washington, Oregon, Idaho, California, Nevada, Utah, Montana, and Arizona. Most locations are tied with Shell, Chevron, and other gas brands (Sinclair, Conoco), although some are standalone stores, and the Arizona market has some that are located in various car washes in the Arizona area.

== History ==
Jacksons was founded in 1975 by John D. Jackson in Caldwell, Idaho with one location in a Texaco. the stores quickly began expanding across states on the West Coast of the United States.

In 2021, they purchased some 7-Eleven stores for further expansion. In 2022, they partnered up with CordovaCann to open Cannabis dispensaries within some Jacksons locations.

In 2022, Jacksons partnered with Boise State University on ONIT athlete to create the first ever college football trading cards. The pack featured the entire Boise State University Football team and was exclusively sold in the Treasure Valley locations

In 2023, they introduced facial recognition technology on their in-store cameras at their locations. Later 80 bitcoin ATMs were introduced to some locations, and customers use their wallets through the company's website or mobile app.

== Philanthropy ==
They participated in Give the Gift of Peace in 2016 with the Washington State Collation to raise domestic violence awareness. They raised $161,369 from customers in 2014 and later were featured at a conference with the Coalitions Against Domestic Violence.

== Controversies ==
=== Disability Discrimination Cases ===
Jacksons was sued by EEOC for refusing to interview a Deaf Person Named Nathaniel Prugh. He was chosen to be interviewed at Sammamish, Wa. When he asked for sign language interpreter as required by American Disability act of 1992 and 2008 and they withdrew the interview.

Jacksons was sued by EEOC for refusing to accommodate a female worker, Penny Wightman, who was recovering from wrist surgery, to go home or have paid leave. Eventually she was fired from her job because of her disability.

Jacksons Settles EEOC Disability Discrimination Lawsuit for $88,000 in the EEOC lawsuit for refusing to interview Nathaniel Prugh when he asked for interpreter for the interview as required by law, American Disability Act 1992 and 2008. Also part of the settlement, Jacksons hired him to work at their store in Seattle, WA.

Jacksons paid $158,000 to settle second EEOC disability discrimination lawsuit to Penny Wightman for refusing accommodate an employee recovering from wrist surgery and fired her because of her disability.

=== Privacy Concerns ===
Some Portland locations installed facial recognition technologies, and two customers sued over their potentially unethical nature and privacy concerns. Facial recognition technology is unlawful for business use in the city. The lawsuit was indefinitely cancelled.

=== Racial Discrimination Case ===
A Portland woman, Rose Wakefield, was denied service by employee Nigel Powers at a Beaverton location and was allegedly told, "I don't serve black people." Cory Jackson, president of the company, had expressed his concern about the employee's behavior but did not choose to pursue the case. Later, she sued Jacksons and won $1 million. Nigel was fired afterward, but not based on the case itself.
