= China–Central Asia Summit =

Diplomatic conference between China and five Central Asian countries

Inaugural China–Central Asia Summit 中国—中亚峰会 Саммит «Китай – Центральная Азия»
- Host country: China; Kazakhstan
- Date: 18–19 May 2023; 16–18 June 2025
- Cities: Xi'an; Astana
- Venues: Xi'an International Conference Center; Palace of Independence
- Participants: China; Kazakhstan; Kyrgyzstan; Tajikistan; Turkmenistan; Uzbekistan
- Chair: Xi Jinping; Kassym-Jomart Tokayev
- Website: www.news.cn/world/zt/zgzywgysfh2023/index.htm

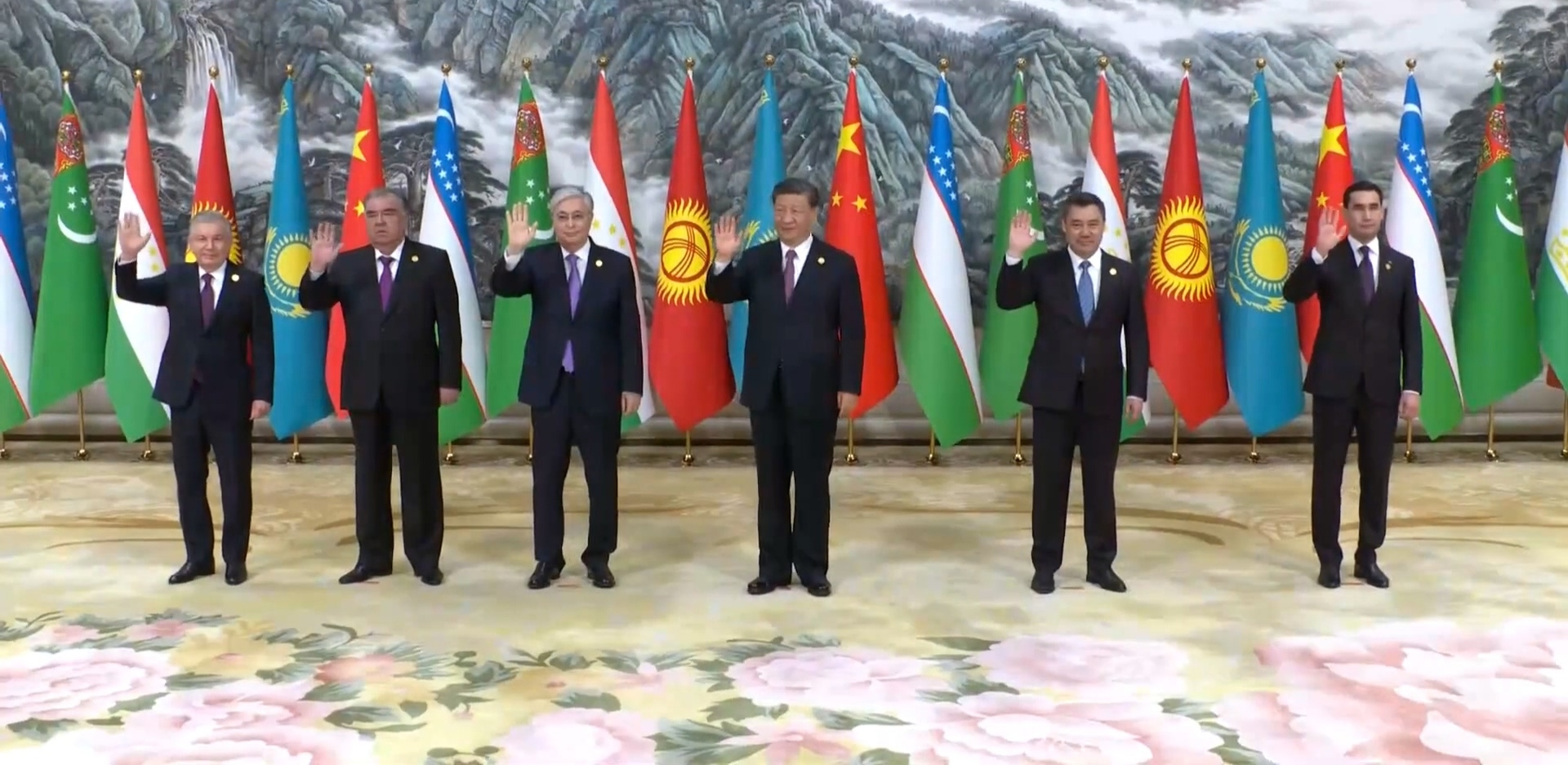
The China–Central Asia Summit on 19 May 2023

China–Central Asia Summit Logo

The China–Central Asia Summit (Chinese: 中国—中亚峰会; Russian: Саммит «Китай – Центральная Азия») is a diplomatic summit held by the leaders of China, Kazakhstan, Kyrgyzstan, Tajikistan, Turkmenistan, and Uzbekistan. The first China–Central Asia Summit was held at the Xi'an International Conference Center in Xi'an, Shaanxi, from May 18 to 19, 2023. Xi Jinping, General Secretary of the Chinese Communist Party, presided over the summit, and the heads of state of the five Central Asian countries attended the summit.

== Preparation ==
On May 8, 2023, Chinese Foreign Ministry spokesperson Hua Chunying announced that CCP general secretary Xi Jinping will host the China–Central Asia Summit on May 18 and 19 in Xi'an, Shaanxi Province. Meanwhile, while four Central Asian leaders will be invited to visit China from the 16th to the 20th, including President Kassym-Jomart Tokayev of Kazakhstan, President Sadyr Japarov of Kyrgyzstan, President Emomali Rahmon of Tajikistan, and President Mirziyoyev of Shavkat Mirziyoyev. The four will join Turkmenistan's President Serdar Berdimuhamedow on the 18th to attend the China–Central Asia Summit on that day.

== Leaders of participating countries ==
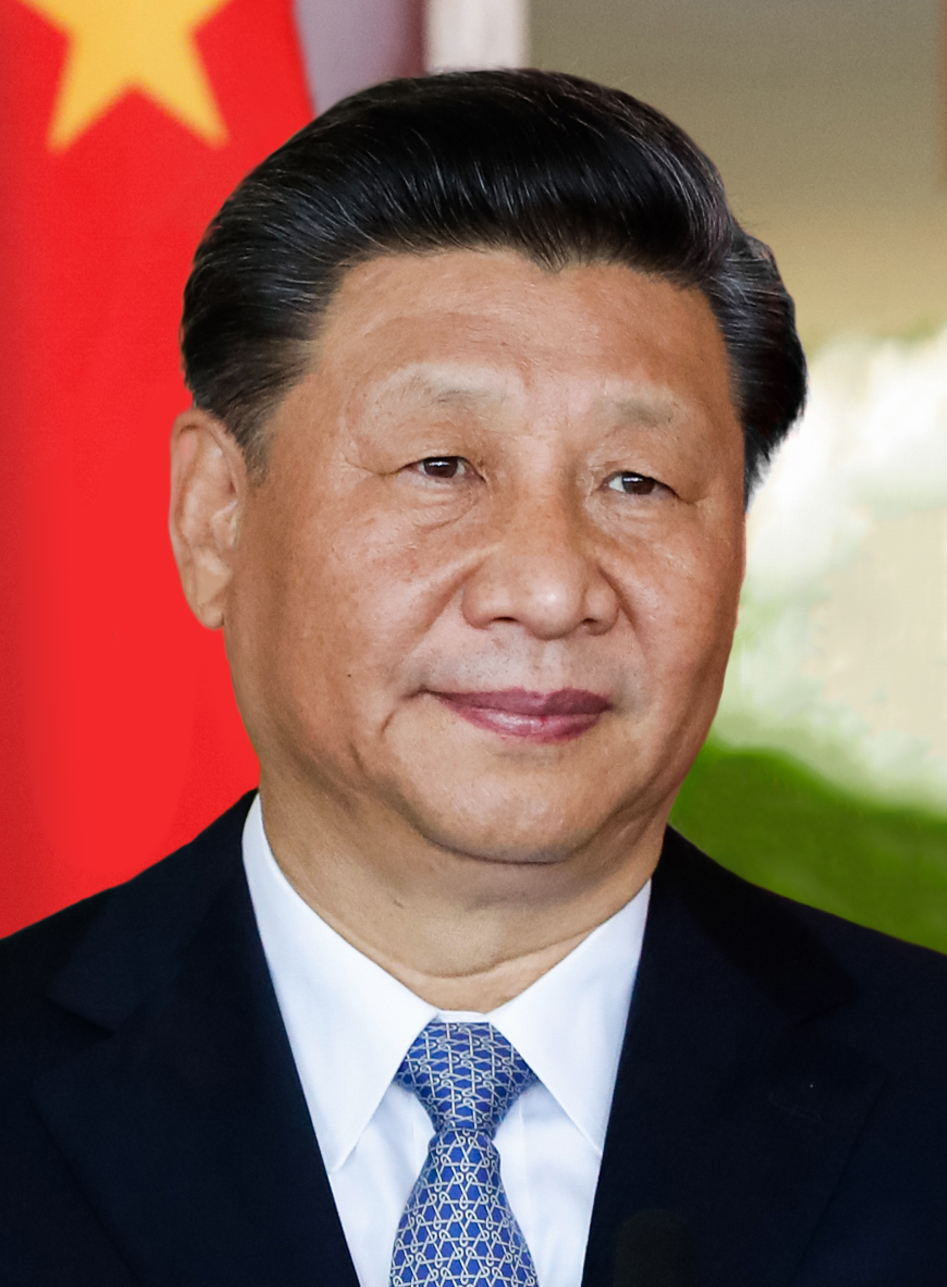
China
CCP General Secretary and President Xi Jinping (Note: The president of China is legally a ceremonial state representative and has no real power in China's political system, but the general secretary of the Chinese Communist Party (de facto top leader in a one-party communist state) has always held this office since 1993 except for the months of transition.)

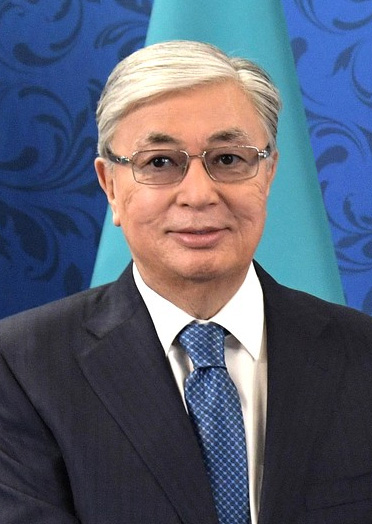
(Kazakhstan) Kazakhstan
President Kassym-Jomart Tokayev

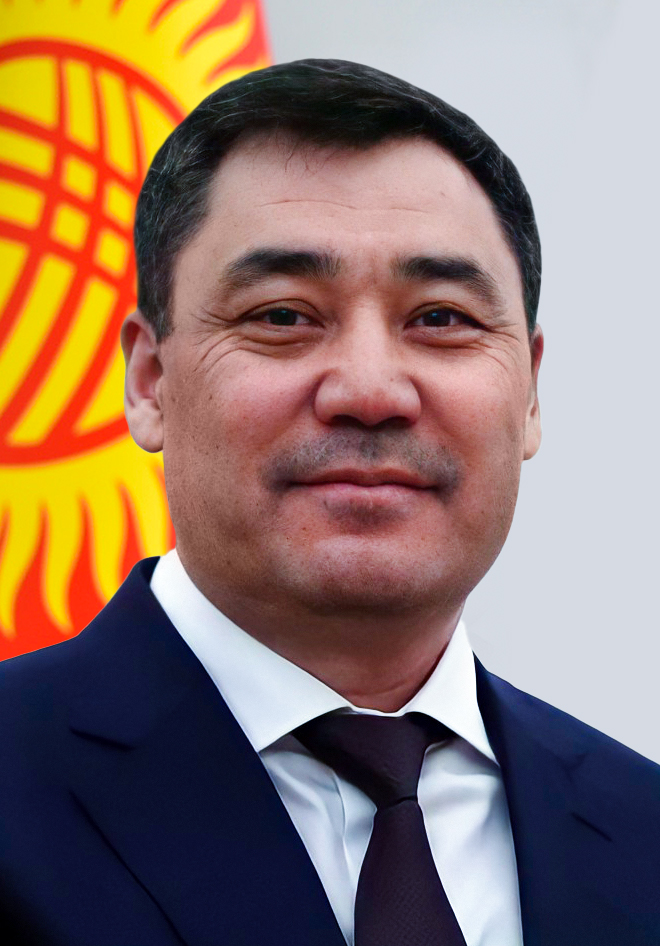
(Kyrgyzstan) Kyrgyzstan
President of Sadyr Japarov

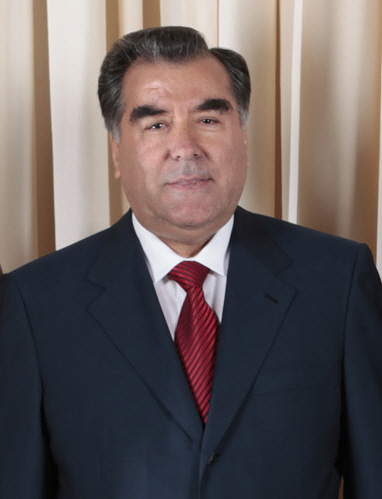
(Tajikistan) Tajikistan
President Emomali Rahmon

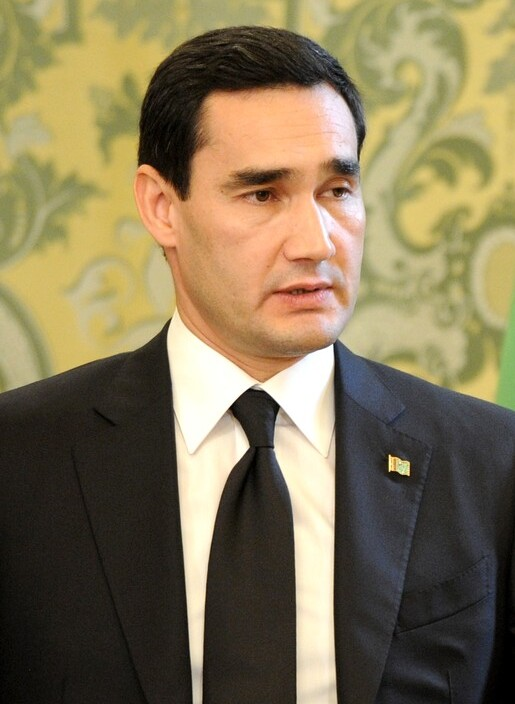
(Turkmenistan) Turkmenistan
President Serdar Berdimuhamedow

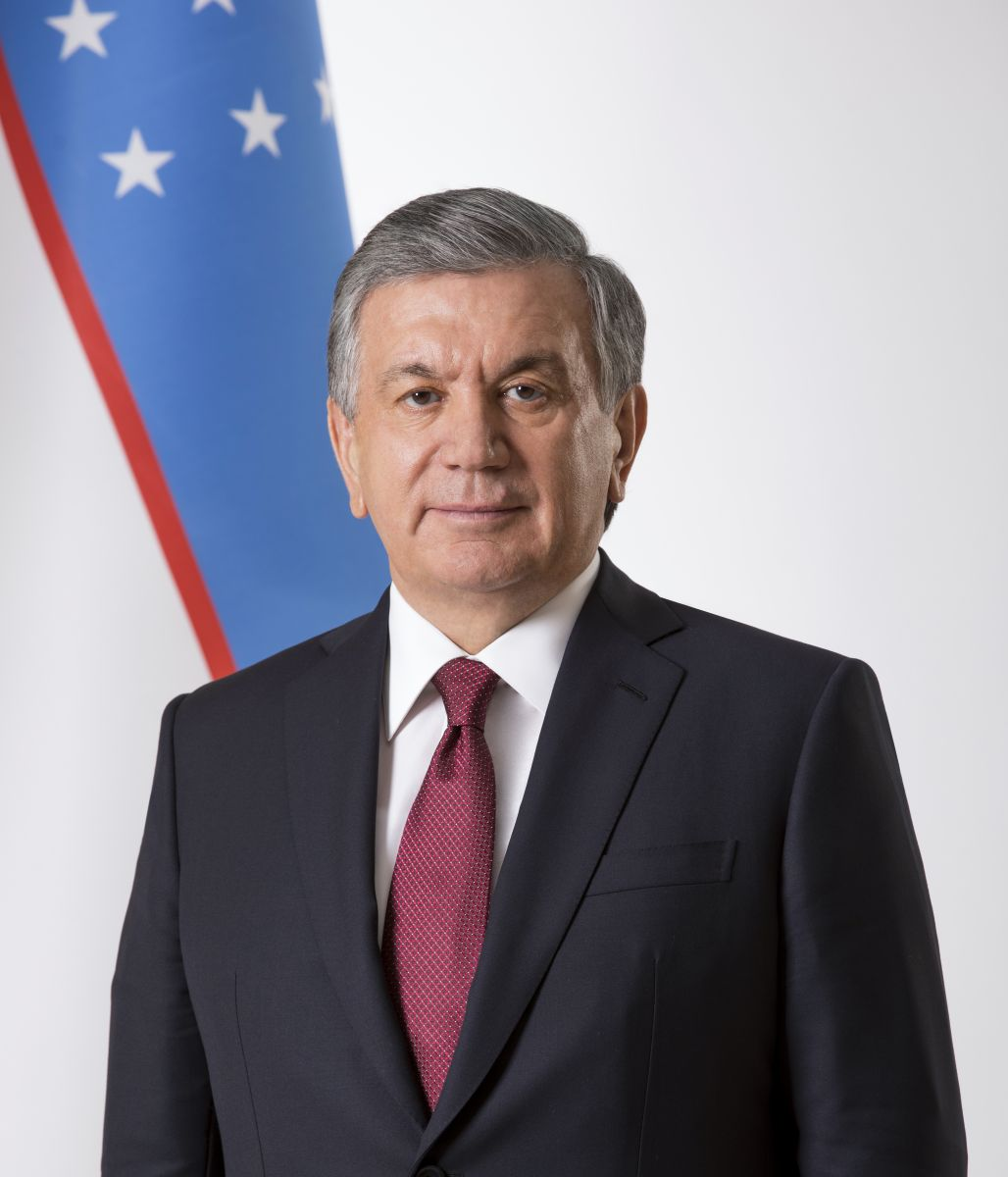
(Uzbekistan) Uzbekistan
President Shavkat Mirziyoyev

== Meeting ==
On the evening of May 18, CCP general secretary Xi Jinping and his wife Peng Liyuan held a welcome banquet for Central Asian Heads of State and their couples attending the China–Central Asia Summit at the Tang Paradise in Xi'an, Shaanxi.

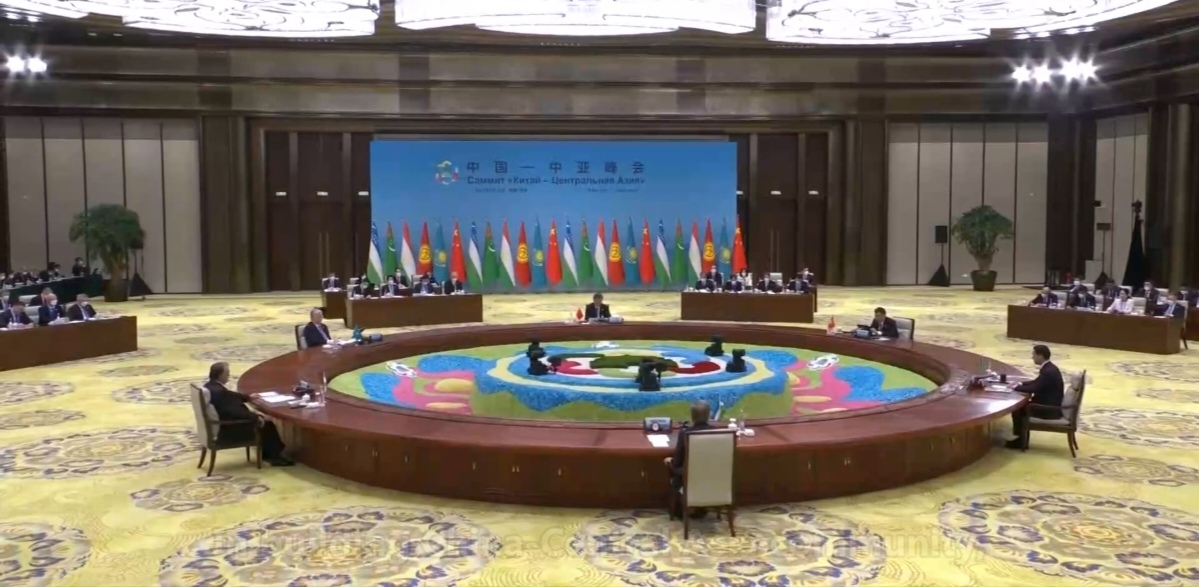
2023 China–Central Asia Summit meeting on May 19, 2023

On the morning of May 19, 2023, the six parties held talks in which China announced that it would provide Central Asian countries with a total of 26 billion Yuan in financing support and non-reimbursable assistance, introduce more trade facilitation initiatives and upgrade bilateral investment agreements, and accelerate the construction of the D-line of the China–Central Asia gas pipeline.

After the meeting, the six leaders attended the signing ceremony of the China–Central Asia Summit and met with journalists. In the afternoon, the six heads of state jointly planted six pomegranate trees.

The summit reached 54 points of major cooperation consensus and initiatives, including the establishment of 19 multilateral cooperation platforms and the conclusion of nine multilateral cooperation documents within the framework of the summit.

The heads agreed to use the organization of the summit as an opportunity to formally establish a mechanism for China–Central Asia Heads of State meetings, which will be held every two years, alternating between China and Central Asian countries. The next summit will be held in Kazakhstan in 2025. The heads of State agreed to establish a permanent secretariat of the China–Central Asia mechanism in China.

== List of summits ==
| # | Date | Host | Host leader | Location held |
|---|---|---|---|---|
| 1st | May 18–19, 2023 | China | Xi Jinping, CCP General Secretary and President of China | Xi'an International Conference Center, Xi'an City, Shaanxi Province |
| 2nd | June 16–18, 2025 | Kazakhstan | Kassym-Jomart Tokayev, President of Kazakhstan | Akorda Residence, Palace of Independence, Astana |

== See also ==
- 2025 China–Central Asia Summit
- China–Kazakhstan relations
  - Central Asia–China gas pipeline
  - Kazakhstan–China oil pipeline
- China–Kyrgyzstan relations
- China–Turkmenistan relations
- China–Tajikistan relations
- China–Uzbekistan relations
