= Central Asian pipeline =

Central Asian pipeline may refer to:

- Central Asia–Center gas pipeline system
- Central Asia–China gas pipeline
- Bukhara–Tashkent–Bishkek–Almaty pipeline
- Kazakhstan–China oil pipeline
