= Energy security of China =

Energy security of the People's Republic of China concerns the need for the People's Republic of China to guarantee itself and its industries long- term access to sufficient energy and raw materials. China has been endeavoring to sign international agreements and secure such supplies; its energy security involves the internal and foreign energy policy of China. Currently, China's energy portfolio consists mainly of domestic coal, oil and gas from domestic and foreign sources, and small quantities of uranium. China has also created a strategic petroleum reserve, to secure emergency supplies of oil for temporary price and supply disruptions. Chinese policy focuses on diversification to reduce oil imports, which used to rely almost exclusively on producers in the Middle East.

Coal supplied most (about 58%) of China's total energy consumption in 2019, down from 59% in 2018. The second-largest fuel source was petroleum and other liquids, accounting for 20% of the country's total energy consumption in 2019. Although China has diversified its energy supplies and cleaner burning fuels have replaced some coal and oil use in recent years, hydroelectric sources (8%), natural gas (8%), nuclear power (2%), and other renewables (nearly 5%) accounted for relatively small but growing shares of China's energy consumption. 4 The Chinese government intends to cap coal use to less than 58% of total primary energy consumption by 2020 in an effort to curtail heavy air pollution that has affected certain areas of the country in recent years. According to China's estimates, coal accounted for a little less than 58% in 2019, which places the government within its goal. 5 Natural gas, nuclear power, and renewable energy consumption have increased during the past few years to offset the drop in coal use.

According to Professor Zha Daojiong, China's dependence on foreign sources of energy is not a threat to China's energy security, since the world energy market is not opposed to China's pursuit of growth and prosperity. The key issue is actually internal: growing internal consumption without energy efficiency threatens both China's growth and world oil markets. Chinese imports are a new determinant encouraging oil price rises on the world market, a concern to developed countries. The international community advocates a move toward energy efficiency and more transparency in China's quest for energy worldwide, to confirm China's responsibility as a member of the international community. Energy efficiency is the only way to avoid excessive Chinese demands on oil at the expense of industrialized and industrializing countries. International projects and technology transfers are ongoing, improving China's energy consumption and benefit the whole energy-importing world; this will also calm Western-Chinese diplomatic tensions. China is trying to establish long-term energy security by investment in oil and gas fields abroad and by diversifying its providers.

== Background ==
Chinese oil reserves

Thanks to the transfer of Soviet oil extraction technologies prior to July 1960 and domestic reserves such as the Daqing oil field, the PRC became oil self-sufficient in 1963. A US-led embargo isolated the Chinese oil industry from 1950 to 1970, preventing it from selling on the world oil market. After the embargo was lifted, China reactivated its links with Japan and other industrialized nations thanks to its oil exports, which helped bring in foreign currencies and fund key industrial plants and technologies for developing its own export-oriented economy. Chinese oil exports peaked in 1985 at 30 million tons. Rapid reforms, in turn, increased domestic oil demand and led China to become a net oil importer in 1993, and net crude oil importer in 1996.

Since 1996 Chinese oil production has slowly and continuously decreased, while demand and imports have steadily increased. Future Chinese oil reserves (such as the Tarim Basin) are difficult to extract, requiring specific technologies as well as the construction of pipelines thousands of kilometers long. As a result, such reserves would be very difficult to develop and not cost-effective, given current market prices.

== Issues that China faces ==
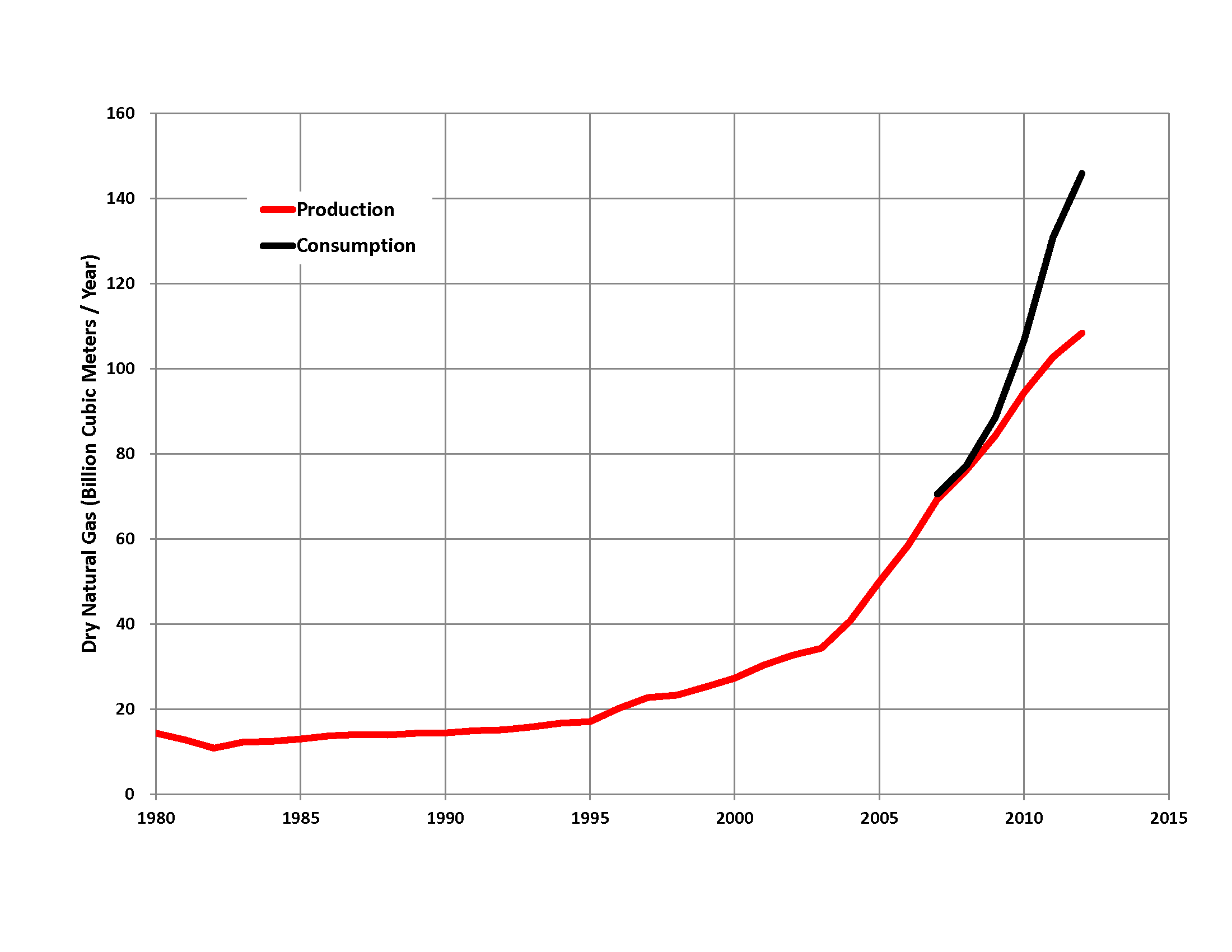
Natural gas production in China (red) has not kept up with consumption (black), requiring increased imports of gas.

=== China's demand for oil ===
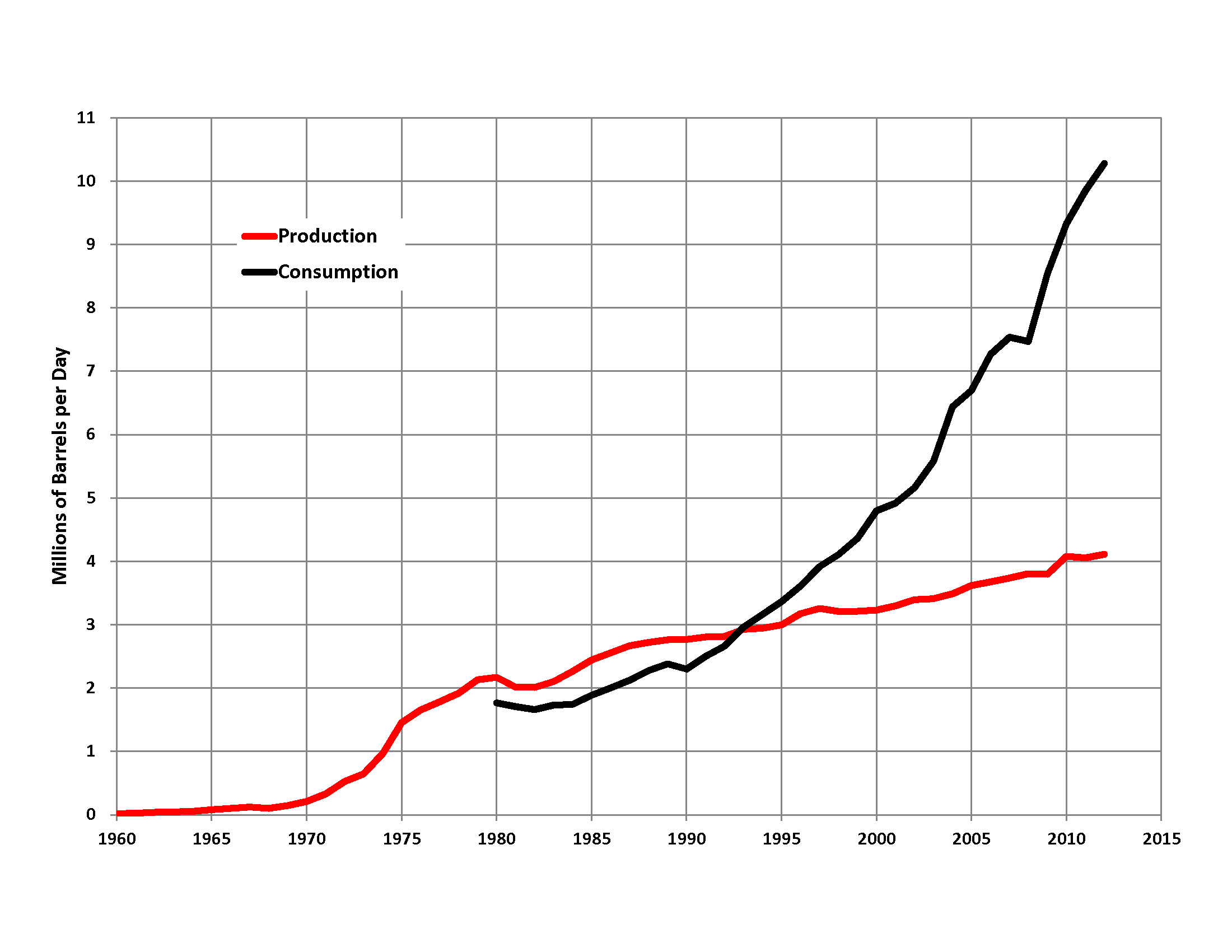
Oil production in China (red) has not kept up with rapidly increasing demand (black).

China is the world's largest crude oil importer and the second-largest crude oil consumer. According to U.S. Energy Information Administration data, China's crude oil imports in 2019 increased to an average of 10.1 million barrels per day (b/d), an increase of 0.9 million b/d from the 2018 average.

China's top five crude suppliers, Saudi Arabia, Russia, Iraq, Angola, and Brazil, generated nearly 60% of Chinese crude oil imports for 2019.

China accounts for 40% of the 2004 oil-consumption increase, and thus is a key part of the cycle which had led to the oil price increase worldwide. China's import dependence remains at 60% as of 2014. In 2005, a campaign to increase energy efficiency was launched without official Ministry of Energy approval; since the campaign was sporadic, this objective seems hard to meet. Zha Daojiong encouraged increased management of oil and energy in China, noting that "It is fair to say that the threat from ineffective energy industry governance is probably as great as that from the international energy market.". A projection that China would reach South Korean levels of per-capita oil consumption in 30 years, combined with the current average global decline in production, could mean that up to 44 Mbbl/d (7,000,000 m^{3}/d) (barrels per day) in production would have to be found in the next decade to keep up with increased demand and production declines. That would be the equivalent of roughly five times Saudi Arabia's production. Superimpose a production plateau of 100 Mbbl/d (16,000,000 m^{3}/d), and significant real-price increases would be necessary to balance supply and demand. Such increases might have severe effects on the growth of emerging market economies such as China's.

=== Nuclear and coal ===
Nuclear power in China accounts for approximately 4.9% of China's electricity, this compares to about 20% in the United States. China still mainly relies on coal for electricity. China is first in the world in both coal production and consumption, which has sparked environmental concerns. In order to achieve environmental targets in combating pollution and global warming, China must ultimately improve its coal efficiency and switch to alternative energy sources.

== Limitations of pipelines and stocks ==
China's natural gas consumption rose by 9% in 2019 to 10.8 trillion cubic feet (Tcf) per year from 9.9 Tcf in 2018. China's NOCs produced an estimated 6.3 cf of natural gas in 2019, 8% higher than in 2018

Three gas lines from Turkmenistan were completed in 2009, 2010 and 2014 respectively, bringing 1.9 Tcf a year China.

The Power of Siberia pipeline started delivering gas in Dec 2020. By 2025 it should deliver 2.1 Tcf a year to China.

China became the largest importer of LNG at the end of 2021. The U.S. Energy Information Administration (EIA) said China's LNG imports averaged 10.3 Bcf/d between January and October – a 24% increase over the same period last year. China's U.S. LNG imports increased by 0.9 Bcf/d from January to October to about 1.1 Bcf/d, ranking the U.S. second behind Australia, which provided 40% of China's LNG imports during the period at an average of 4.1 Bcf/d. Qatar and Malaysia supplied China with amounts similar to those of the United States. All three countries provided about 11% of China's total LNG imports through October. Another 19 countries rounded out China's LNG supplies.

China's eastern and southern regions have chronic energy shortages, causing blackouts and limiting economic growth. For supplying these regions, liquefied natural gas from Australia and Indonesia is more feasible and cheaper to import than the Tarim Basin pipeline. However, the first West–East Gas Pipeline from Xinjiang to Shanghai was commissioned in 2004, and construction of the second pipeline from Xinjiang to Guangzhou in Guangdong began in 2008.

Sinopec accounts for 80% of Chinese oil imports. Refinery capacity is continuously strained, and perennially lags behind fast domestic-demand growth. China has had to rely on entrepôt refineries located in Singapore, Japan and Korea. Oil and gas exploration in the Tarim Basin is ongoing. However, developing this potential reserve is currently not cost-effective due to technological limitations coupled with fluctuations in world oil prices. Therefore, this is considered by some as a last-resort option.

In China, the gas price is not market-driven, which causes uncertainty in the production process.

=== Energy efficiency ===
A key point for China's energy-security goal of reducing oil imports is to improve the efficiency of its domestic energy markets by accelerating pricing, regulatory and other reforms. China is actively looking for smart-energy technology.

== Foreign relations ==
Chinese oil imports by region of origin
	1990	2000	2004	2019
Mdl East	39.4%	53.5%	45.4%	44%
Africa	0%	23%	28.7%	19%
Asia Pacific	60.6%	15.1%	4.5%	3%
Russia	NA	NA	7%	15%
Western Hemisphere	0%	7.2%	14.3%	15%
Sources: CQE, p12-15; CES, p49. EIA

=== Middle East ===
On the issue of energy security, China relies mainly on Persian Gulf exports. In contrast with the US, China is not associated with the Arab–Israeli conflicts and may focus simply on oil supply from an economic standpoint. The increase in Chinese dependence on Persian Gulf oil also means an associated increasing economic dependence on Arabian exporters, who will probably not join hands to block exports to China.

Chinese dependence on the Middle East is also a cause of concern for the US. In 2004, when the Bush administration actively discouraged oil companies from investing in Iran, the Chinese company Sinopec did not comply with its call.

Recently, China has changed its anti-Western diplomatic stance to a softer, global, more efficient diplomacy with a focus on energy and raw-materials security. In post-2003 Iraq, China does its best to comply with UN sanctions.

=== Japan and Korea ===
When China became an oil importer during the 1990s, its relations with neighboring countries (as exporter to East Asia and importer of Korean and Japanese oil) changed. Its main oil provider changed in a few years from domestic production, to East Asian production, and then to Mideast production. On the other hand, despite insufficient domestic oil output China does its best to stabilize exports to Japan and Korea. China endeavors to continue energy relationships it has created with developed nations, since they contribute to China's energy security with investment and technology. More Chinese oil output is in Japanese, Korean, Chinese, and world interests. Since China lacks strategic entrepôt refineries, it relies heavily on refineries in Singapore, Japan, and Korea.

=== Taiwan ===
China's dependence on foreign oil weakens its ability to pressure Taiwan, since a conflict may trigger a US oil embargo as a consequence. Since Sudan is pro-Chinese and Chad was pro-Taiwan (and an oil producer since 2003), China had an interest in replacing Chad's president Idriss Déby with a pro-Chinese leader. The FUC Chad rebellion, based in Sudan and aiming to overthrow the pro-Taiwanese Déby, seems to have received Chinese diplomatic support as well as weapons and Sudanese oil. The 2006 Chadian coup d'état attempt failed after French Air Force intervention, but Déby then switched his friendship to Beijing; the field defeat became a Chinese strategic victory.

=== Russia ===
In February 2009, Russia and China signed an agreement in which a spur of the Eastern Siberia–Pacific Ocean oil pipeline to China would be built and Russia would supply China with 15 million tonnes of oil (300,000 barrels (48,000 m^{3}) per day) each year for 20 years, in exchange for a loan worth US$25 billion to Russian companies Transneft and Rosneft for pipeline and oilfield development.

=== Australia ===
On August 19, 2009, Chinese petroleum company PetroChina signed an A$50 billion deal with American multinational petroleum company ExxonMobil to purchase liquefied natural gas from the Gorgon field in Western Australia; this was believed to be the largest contract ever signed between China and America – ensuring China a steady supply of LPG fuel for 20 years. This agreement has been formalised despite relations between Australia and China being at their lowest point in years following the Rio Tinto espionage case and the granting of a visa to Rebiya Kadeer to visit Australia.

=== Central Asia ===
China has constructed an oil pipeline from Kazakhstan and started construction of a Central Asia–China gas pipeline.

=== Sea lanes ===
Ratification of the Law of the Sea Treaty is linked to China's need to secure its oil and raw materials shipping from the Middle East, Africa, and Europe, since those materials have to pass through the Strait of Malacca and the Red Sea.

=== Oil diplomacy ===
The appearance of China on the world energy scene is somewhat disturbing for developed nations. China's relative energy inexperience also raises diplomatic difficulties. Strengthening ties with oil producers such as Iran, Sudan, Uzbekistan, Angola and Venezuela also raised concerns for U.S. and other Western diplomacy, since several of these countries are known to be anti-American and/or known for human rights abuses, political censorship, and widespread corruption. These moves seem to challenge Western powers, by strengthening anti-Western countries. But this is unlikely; as a developing consumer economy, China does not have much of a choice in its sources of supply.

=== Poor communication ===
It is claimed that Chinese oil companies are unaccustomed to political risks and avoiding diplomatic conflict. In any case, the Chinese government will still be seen as ultimately responsible for conflict resolution. Communication has also been a weak point for Chinese companies. Lack of transparency in cases such as Chinese involvement in Sudan have raised concern in the US, until it was revealed that most of the oil produced was sold on international markets. Lack of cooperation with other major oil companies has led to business clashes, spilling into the diplomatic arena when both sides call their respective governments to support their interests (CNOOC versus Chevron-Texaco for Unocal, for example).

== See also ==
- Energy diplomacy
- Energy policy of China
- Renewable energy in China
- Energy security
- African oil and China

== Sources ==
- CES: Zha Daojiong (查道炯) (November 2005). China's Energy Security and Its International Relations (PDF). Vol. 3. The China and Eurasia Forum Quarterly. pp. 39–54. Archived from the original (PDF) on 2012-02-14.
- CQE: Ingolf Kiesow (Nov 2004). "China's Quest for Energy:Impact upon Foreign and Security Policy" (PDF). Proceedings of the ... Swedish American Workshop on Modeling and Simulation: Sawmas. Stockholm: Swedish Defence Research Agency: 61. ISSN 1650-1942. Archived from the original (PDF) on 2012-02-24.
- IEA: Robert Priddle (ex. dir.) (2000). China's Worldwide Quest for Energy Security (PDF). The International Energy Agency (IEA). p. 80. Archived from the original (PDF) on 2009-06-17.
