= Petroleum politics =

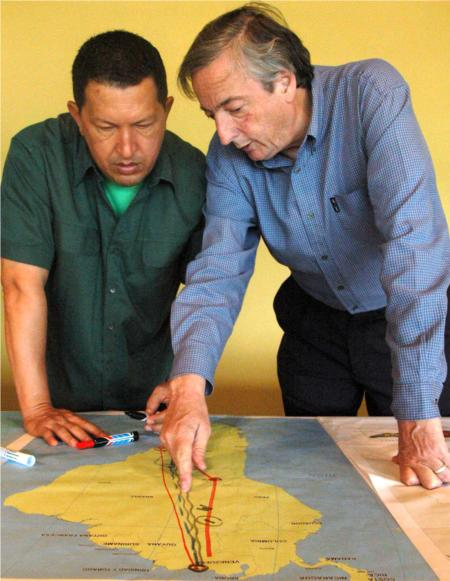
Argentine president Néstor Kirchner and Venezuelan President Hugo Chávez discuss the Gran Gasoducto del Sur, an energy and trade integration project for South America. They met on 21 November 2005, in Venezuela.

Petroleum politics have been an increasingly important aspect of diplomacy since the rise of the petroleum industry in the Middle East in the early 20th century. As competition continues for a vital resource, the strategic calculations of major and minor countries alike place prominent emphasis on the pumping, refining, transport, sale and use of petroleum products.

== Quota agreements ==
The Achnacarry Agreement or "As-Is Agreement" was an early attempt to restrict petroleum production, signed in Scotland on 17 September 1928. The discovery of the East Texas Oil Field in the 1930s led to a boom in production that caused prices to fall, leading the Railroad Commission of Texas to control production. The Commission retained de facto control of the market until the rise of OPEC in the 1970s.

The Anglo-American Petroleum Agreement of 1944 tried to extend these restrictions internationally but was opposed by the industry in the United States and so Franklin Roosevelt withdrew from the deal.

Venezuela was the first country to move towards the establishment of OPEC by approaching Iran, Gabon, Libya, Kuwait and Saudi Arabia in 1949, but OPEC was not set up until 1960, when the United States forced import quotas on Venezuelan and Persian Gulf oil in order to support the Canadian and Mexican oil industries. OPEC first wielded its power with the 1973 oil embargo against the United States and Western Europe.

== Oil and international conflict ==
The term "petro-aggression" has been used to describe the tendency of oil-rich states to instigate international conflicts. There are many examples including: Iraq's invasion of Iran and Kuwait; Libya's repeated incursions into Chad in the 1970s and 1980s; Iran's long-standing suspicion of Western powers. Some scholars have also suggested that oil-rich states are frequently the targets of "resource wars."

Cullen Hendrix, author of the academic article "Oil Prices and Interstate Conflict", focuses on creating a more sound measurement of an index, building off of Colgan and Weeks indices respectfully. Hendrix findings are such that as the price in oil goes up the more confrontational a petro-state becomes. This may be due to the fact that these countries can now invest more heavily in their military. When people feel secure, they tend to give a higher approval rating to the leader. A petro-state GDP will grow, offering the opportunity for a more diverse industry, which in turn gives more bargaining chips in terms of global negotiations.

Research by Emily Meierding has characterized oil wars as largely a myth. She argues that proponents of oil wars underestimate the ability to seize and exploit foreign oil fields, and thus exaggerate the value of oil wars. She has examined four cases commonly described as oil wars (Japan's attack on the Dutch East Indies in World War II, Iraq's invasion of Kuwait, the Iran-Iraq War, and the Chaco War between Bolivia and Paraguay), finding that control of additional oil resources was not the main cause of aggression in the conflicts.

A 2024 study found that the presence of oil in contested territory can make states less likely to seek to acquire the territory.

== Peak oil ==
In 1956, a Shell geophysicist named M. King Hubbert accurately predicted that U.S. oil production would peak in 1970.

In 1970, production effectively peaked in the United States.

In June 2006, former U.S. president Bill Clinton said in a speech,

"We may be at a point of peak oil production. You may see $100 a barrel oil in the next two or three years, but what still is driving this globalization is the idea that is you cannot possibly get rich, stay rich and get richer if you don't release more greenhouse gases into the atmosphere. That was true in the industrial era; it is simply factually not true. What is true is that the old energy economy is well organized, financed and connected politically."

In a 1999 speech, Dick Cheney, the US vice president and former CEO of Halliburton (one of the world's largest energy services corporations), said,

"By some estimates there will be an average of two per cent annual growth in global oil demand over the years ahead along with conservatively a three per cent natural decline in production from existing reserves. That means by 2010 we will need on the order of an additional fifty million barrels a day. So where is the oil going to come from?....While many regions of the world offer great oil opportunities, the Middle East with two thirds of the world's oil and the lowest cost, is still where the prize ultimately lies, even though companies are anxious for greater access there, progress continues to be slow."

Cheney went on to argue that the oil industry should become more active in politics:

"Oil is the only large industry whose leverage has not been all that effective in the political arena. Textiles, electronics, agriculture all seem often to be more influential. Our constituency is not only oilmen from Louisiana and Texas, but software writers in Massachusetts and specialty steel producers in Pennsylvania. I am struck that this industry is so strong technically and financially yet not as politically successful or influential as are often smaller industries. We need to earn credibility to have our views heard."

== Pipeline diplomacy in the Caspian Sea area ==
Location of Baku–Tbilisi–Ceyhan pipeline

The Baku–Tbilisi–Ceyhan pipeline was built to transport crude oil and the Baku-Tbilisi-Erzurum pipeline was built to transport natural gas from the western side (Azerbaijani sector) of the Caspian Sea to the Mediterranean Sea bypassing Russian pipelines and thus Russian control. Following the construction of the pipelines, the United States and the European Union proposed extending them by means of the proposed Trans-Caspian Oil Pipeline and the Trans-Caspian Gas Pipeline under the Caspian Sea to oil and gas fields on the eastern side (Kazakhstan and Turkmenistan sectors) of the Caspian Sea. In 2007, Russia signed agreements with Turkmenistan and Kazakhstan to connect their oil and gas fields to the Russian pipeline system effectively killing the undersea route.

China has completed the Kazakhstan–China oil pipeline from the Kazakhstan oil fields to the Chinese Alashankou-Dushanzi Crude Oil Pipeline in China. China is also working on the Kazakhstan-China gas pipeline from the Kazakhstan gas fields to the Chinese West-East Gas Pipeline in China.

== Politics of oil nationalization ==
Several countries have nationalised foreign-run oil businesses, often failing to compensate investors. Enrique Mosconi, the director of the Argentine state owned oil company Yacimientos Petrolíferos Fiscales (YPF, which was the first state owned oil company in the world, preceding the French Compagnie française des pétroles (CFP, French Company of Petroleums, today TotalEnergies), created in 1924 by the conservative Raymond Poincaré), advocated oil nationalization in the late 1920s among Latin American countries. The latter was achieved in Mexico during Lázaro Cárdenas's rule, with the Expropiación petrolera.

Similarly Venezuela nationalized its oil industry in 1976.

== Politics of alternative fuels ==
Vinod Khosla (a well known investor in IT firms and alternative energy) has argued that the political interests of environmental advocates, agricultural businesses, energy security advocates (such as ex-CIA director James Woolsey) and automakers, are all aligned for the increased production of ethanol. He pointed out that from 2003 to 2006, ethanol fuel in Brazil replaced 40% of its gasoline consumption while flex fuel vehicles went from 3% of car sales to 70%. Brazilian ethanol, which is produced using sugarcane, reduces greenhouse gases by 60-80% (20% for corn-produced ethanol). Khosla also said that ethanol was about 10% cheaper per given distance. There are currently ethanol subsidies in the United States but they are all blender's credits, meaning the oil refineries receive the subsidies rather than the farmers. There are indirect subsidies due to subsidising farmers to produce corn. Vinod says after one of his presentations in Davos, a senior Saudi oil official came up to him and threatened: "If biofuels start to take off, we will drop the price of oil." Since then, Vinod has come up with a new recommendation that oil should be taxed if it drops below $40.00/barrel in order to counter price manipulation.

Ex-CIA director James Woolsey and U.S. Senator Richard Lugar are also vocal proponents of ethanol.

It is argued that international climate policy and unconventional oil and gas developments may change the balance of power between petroleum exporting and importing countries with major negative implications expected for the exporting states. From around 2015 onwards, there was increasing discussion about whether the geopolitics of oil and gas would be replaced by the geopolitics of renewable energy resources and critical materials for renewable energy technologies.

Some authors argue that compared to the geopolitics of fossil fuels, renewable energy may cause more small-scale conflicts but reduce the risk of large inter-state conflicts.

The anti-nuclear movement received some funding early on from fossil fuel companies, including petroleum interests. Even in the 21st century there are continuing efforts by fossil fuel companies to paint nuclear energy in a negative light and to position fossil gas and oil as a "perfect partner for renewables".

== Key oil producing countries ==
=== Canada ===
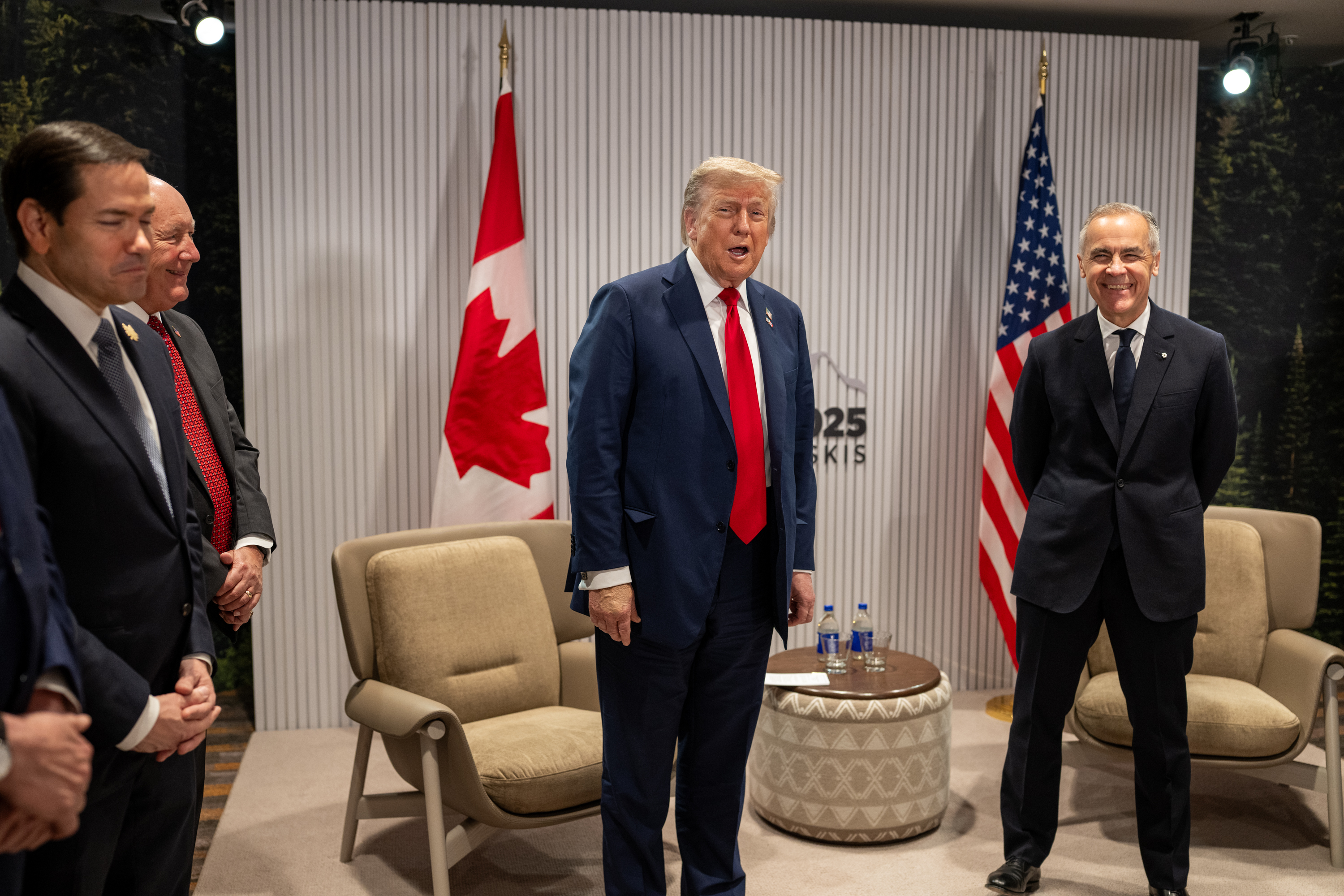
Canadian Prime Minister Mark Carney and U.S. President Donald Trump at the 51st G7 summit in May 2025

As development in the Alberta oil sands, deep sea drilling in the North Atlantic and the prospects of arctic oil continue to grow Canada increasingly grows as a global oil exporter. There are currently three major pipelines under proposal that would ship oil to the pacific, atlantic and gulf ports. These projects have stirred internal controversy, receiving fierce opposition from First Nations groups and environmentalists.

In June 2025, after becoming prime minister, Mark Carney voiced support for a new oil pipeline to the West Coast and a proposed $16.5 billion carbon capture system for the Athabasca oil sands. A deal was reached for the pipeline and carbon capture system in November 2025. The One Canadian Economy Act speeds up approval of projects deemed of national interest, potentially including mines and oil pipelines, and eliminates some trade barriers between provinces.

=== Iran ===
Discovery of oil in 1908 at Masjed Soleiman in Iran initiated the quest for oil in the Middle East. The Anglo-Iranian Oil Company (AIOC) was founded in 1909. In 1951, Iran nationalized its oil fields, initiating the Abadan Crisis. The Central Intelligence Agency and MI6 responded by supporting a coup against its democratically elected prime minister, Mosaddeq, and brought the former Shah's son to power in 1953. During the coup, Western-back Iranian rebels arrested Mosaddeq and kept him under house arrest. Iran exports oil to China and Russia.

=== Iraq ===
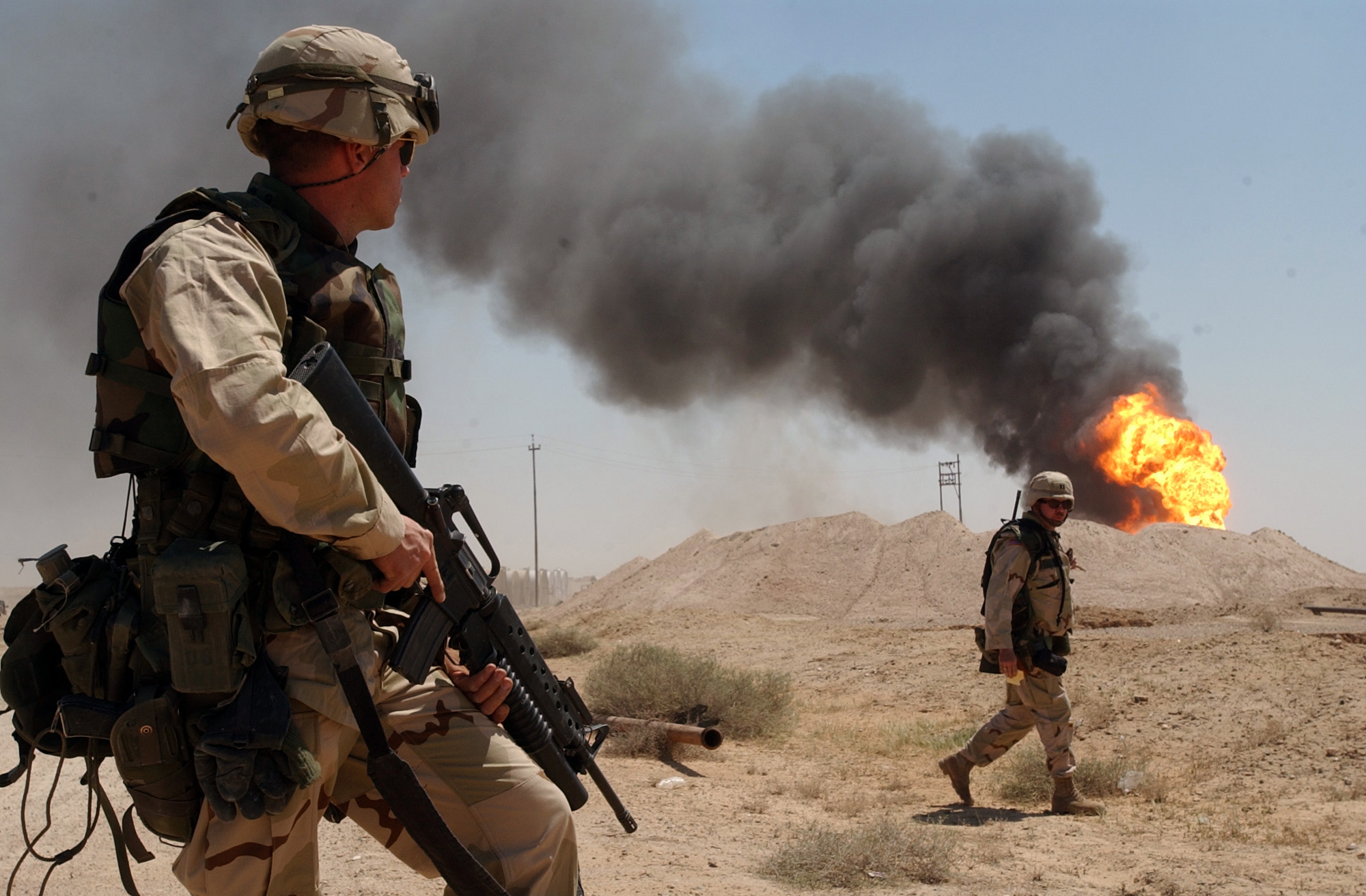
A U.S. soldier stands guard duty near a burning oil well in the Rumaila oil field, Iraq, April 2003.

Iraq holds the world's second-largest proven oil reserves, with increasing exploration expected to enlarge them beyond 200 billion barrels (3.2×10^{10} m^{3}) of "high-grade crude, extraordinarily cheap to produce." Organizations such as the Global Policy Forum (GPF) have asserted that Iraq's oil is "the central feature of the political landscape" there, and that as a result of the 2003 invasion,"'friendly' companies expect to gain most of the lucrative oil deals that will be worth hundreds of billions of dollars in profits in the coming decades." According to GPF, U.S. influence over the 2005 Constitution of Iraq has made sure it "contains language that guarantees a major role for foreign companies."

=== Mexico ===
Mexico has a largely oil-based economy, being the seventh largest producer of petroleum. Though Mexico has gradually explored different types of electricity, oil is still crucial, recently generating 10% of revenue.

Before 1938, all petroleum companies in Mexico were foreign based, often from the United States or Europe. The petroleum industry was nationalized in the late 1930s to early 1940s by then-president Lázaro Cárdenas, creating PEMEX. Mexico's oil industry still remains heavily nationalized. Though oil production has fallen in recent years, Mexico still remains in seventh place.

=== Norway ===
Although Norway relies heavily on natural gas and oil for export income, the country consumes almost none of the petroleum resources that they produce. In 2017, Norway was ranked 3rd behind Russia and Qatar as the world's largest natural gas exporter. Norway was also the 8th largest exporter of crude oil in the world. These industries are a vital part of Norway's economy, making up nearly 50% of the country's total export value and accounts for 17% of its GDP.

Norway however, runs on 98% renewable energy with a heavy emphasis on hydroelectric power. Their development of renewable energy allows Norway to export their non-renewable energy to turn a profit. "Nearly all oil and gas produced on the Norwegian shelf is exported, and combined, oil and gas equals about half of the total value of Norwegian exports of goods. This makes oil and gas the most important export commodities in the Norwegian economy." This has positioned Norway in a conflicting position, as they aspire to be the world's leading climate change combatant while still drilling/fracking in the North Sea, Norwegian Sea, and the Barents Sea.

Several Norwegian environmental groups, such as Greenpeace Norway and Young Friends of the Earth Norway, have sued the Norwegian government for the opening of new oil and natural gas plants in the Arctic. As Norway continues to pursue a green future, the Norwegian government pursues different avenues of justifying that petroleum has a place in a low-carbon future. Norway's government is continuing to pass measures to bolster their oil and natural gas sectors, while simultaneously passing legislation to further their environmental agenda. Continued dependence on oil production has strong support in the government: "...the petroleum policy in Norway has been supported by the largest political parties across the left-right cleavage in Norwegian politics. Although there have been tensions on certain issues, the Labour Party, the Conservative Party, and the Progress Party make up the majority of support for the current petroleum policy in Parliament."

Norway has avoided the "oil curse" or "dutch disease" Dutch disease that many oil producing countries have experienced, in part because it began to harvest petroleum resources at a time when the government regulation was well developed and already in an economically strong position: "Norway had the advantage of entering its oil era with a mature, open democracy as well as bureaucratic institutions with experience regulating other natural resource industries (hydropower generation, fishing, and mining for example)".

As Norway began to exploit their petroleum resources, the government took steps to ensure that the natural resource industry did not deplete other industries in Norway by funneling profits from the state owned operations into a pension fund known as the Government Pension Fund Global (GPFG). The GPFG is the world's largest sovereign wealth fund and was established for the purpose of investing in the surplus revenues of the petroleum sector in Norway. "The Norwegian government receives these funds from their market shares within oil industries, such as their two-thirds share of Statoil, and allocates it through their government-controlled domestic economy."

=== Nigeria ===
Petroleum in Nigeria was discovered in 1955 at Oloibiri in the Niger Delta. High oil prices were the driving force behind Nigeria's economic growth. This has made the Nigerian economy to become the largest in Africa surpassing both Egypt and South Africa, also making it the 24th largest in the world. The Nigerian economy is heavily dependent on the oil sector, which accounts for 98% percent of export earnings and 83% of federal government revenues as well as generating 14% of its GDP.

Even with the substantial oil wealth, Nigeria ranks as one of the poorest countries in the world, with a $1,000 per capita income and more than 70 percent of the population living in poverty. In October 2005, the 15-member Paris Club announced that it would cancel 60 percent of the debt owed by Nigeria. However, Nigeria must still pay $12.4 billion in arrears amongst meeting other conditions. In March 2006, phase two of the Paris Club agreement will include an additional 34 percent debt cancellation, while Nigeria will be responsible for paying back any remaining eligible debts to the lending nations. The International Monetary Fund (IMF), which recently praised the Nigerian government for adopting tighter fiscal policies, will be allowed to monitor Nigeria without having to disburse loans to the country.

=== Russia ===
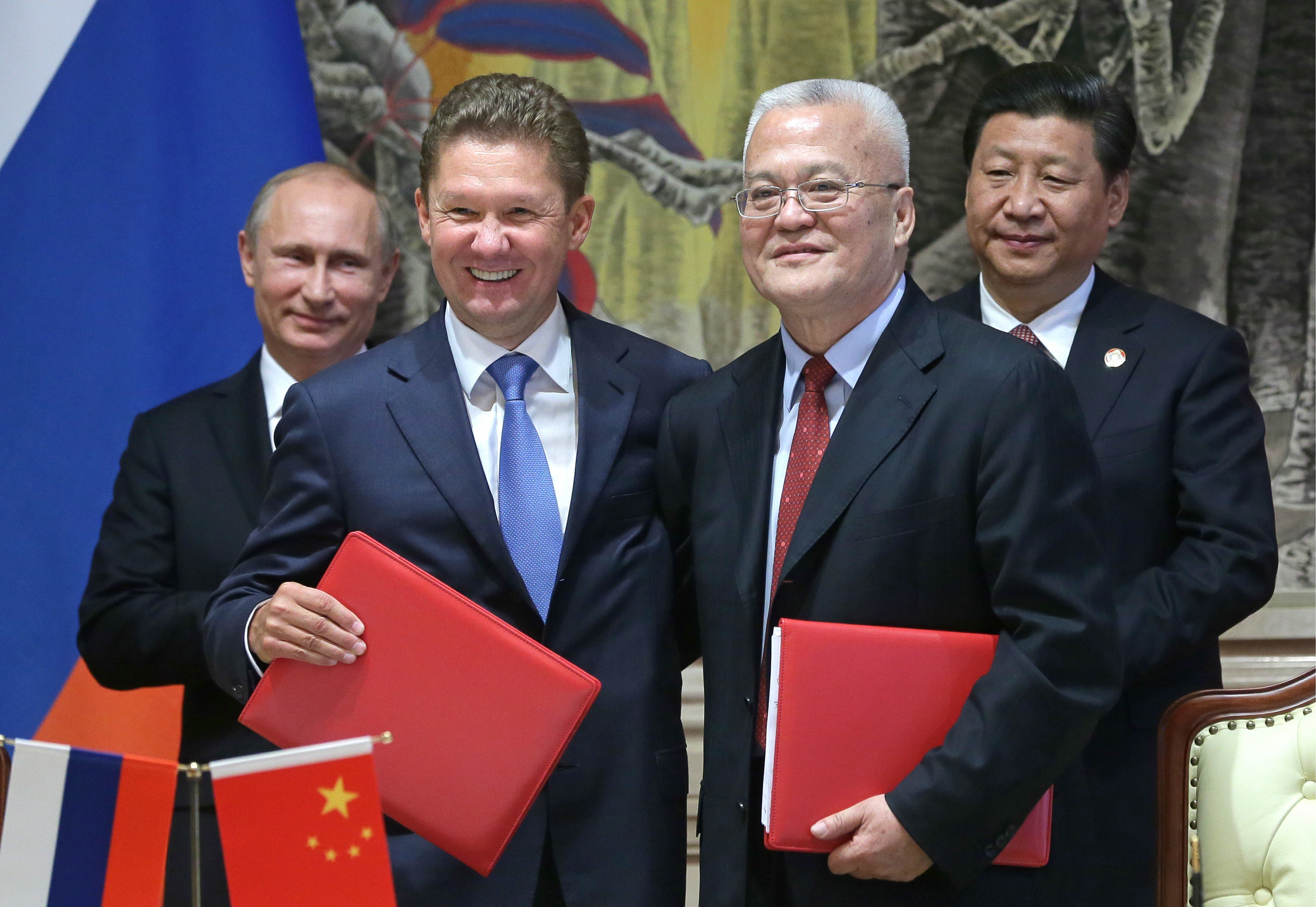
On 21 May 2014, Russia and China signed a $400 billion gas deal for natural gas supplies via the Eastern Route.

High-priced oil allowed the Soviet Union to subsidize the struggling economies of the Soviet bloc for a time, and the loss of petrodollar income during the 1980s oil glut contributed to the bloc's collapse in 1989.

On 22 October 2025, the United States imposed sanctions against Russia's largest oil companies Rosneft and Lukoil. The U.S. also threatened secondary sanctions against foreign financial institutions and companies that continue to do business with Rosneft and Lukoil, which would affect their customers in China, India and Turkey.

=== Saudi Arabia ===
In 1973, Saudi Arabia and other Arab nations imposed an oil embargo against the United States, United Kingdom, Japan and other Western nations which supported Israel in the Yom Kippur War of October 1973. The embargo caused an oil crisis with many short- and long-term effects on global politics and the global economy.

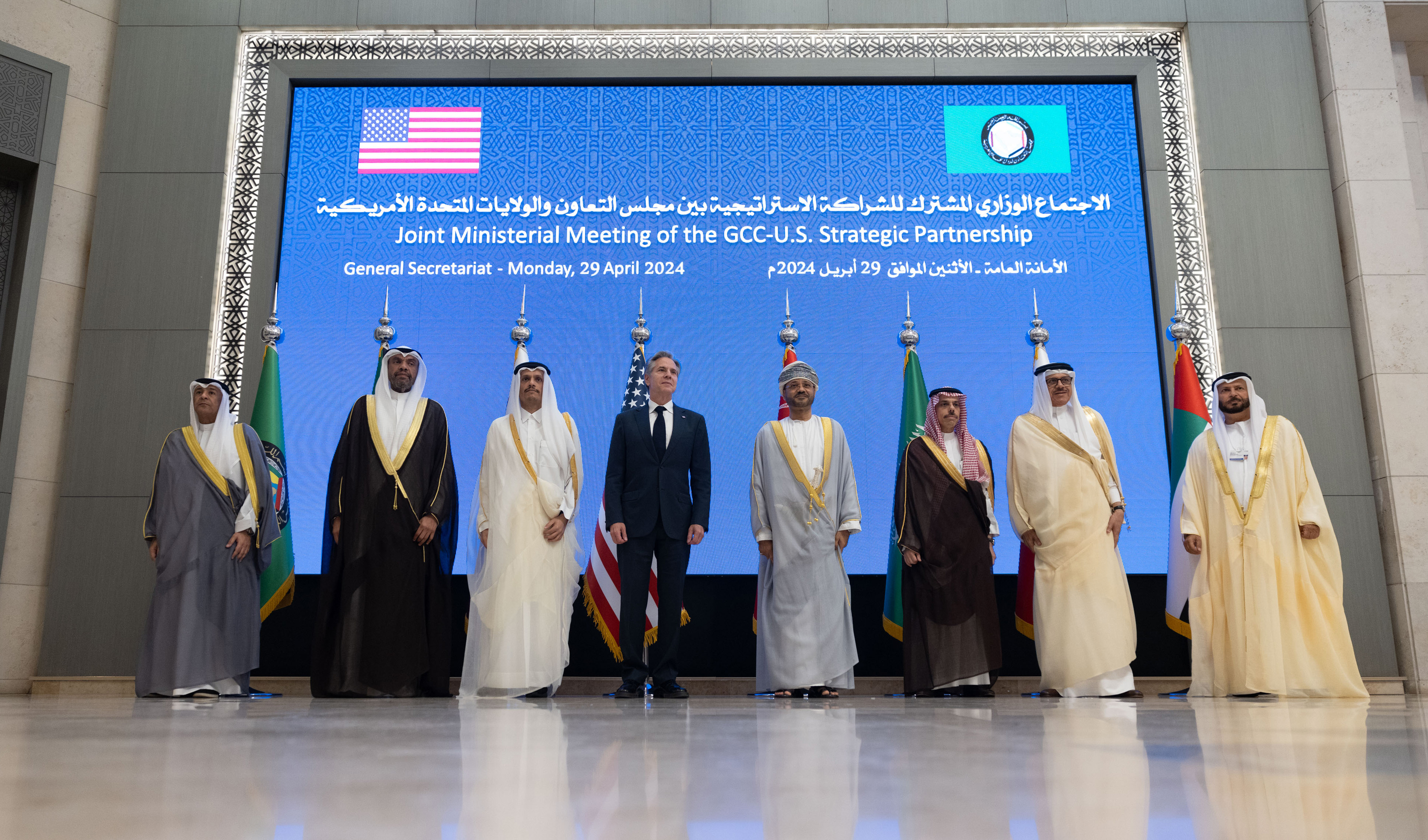
US Secretary of State Antony Blinken and foreign ministers of the Gulf Cooperation Council member states in Riyadh, Saudi Arabia, 19 April 2024

Saudi Arabia is an oil-based economy with strong government controls over major economic activities. It possesses both the world's largest known oil reserves, which are 25% of the world's proven reserves, and produces the largest amount of the world's oil. As of 2005, Ghawar field accounts for about half of Saudi Arabia's total oil production capacity.

Saudi Arabia ranks as the largest exporter of petroleum, and plays a leading role in OPEC, its decisions to raise or cut production almost immediately impact world oil prices. It is perhaps the best example of a contemporary energy superpower, in terms of having power and influence on the global stage (due to its energy reserves and production of not just oil, but natural gas as well). Saudi Arabia is often referred to as the world's only "oil superpower".

It has been suggested that the Iran–Saudi Arabia proxy conflict was a powerful influence in the Saudi decision to launch the price war in 2014, as was Cold War rivalry between the United States and Russia. Larry Elliott argued that "with the help of its Saudi ally, Washington is trying to drive down the oil price by flooding an already weak market with crude. As the Russians and the Iranians are heavily dependent on oil exports, the assumption is that they will become easier to deal with." Vice President of Russia's largest oil company, Rosneft, accused Saudi Arabia of conspiring against Russia. After Russia invaded Ukraine in 2022, Saudi Arabia declined US requests to increase oil production and thus undercut Russia's war finances. In April 2022, CIA director William Burns traveled to Saudi Arabia to meet with Saudi Crown Prince Mohammed bin Salman, asking him to increase the country's oil production. The Saudi government also declined a US request to postpone an OPEC decision until after the 2022 United States elections, leading President Joe Biden to threaten "consequences" against Saudi Arabia.

=== United States ===
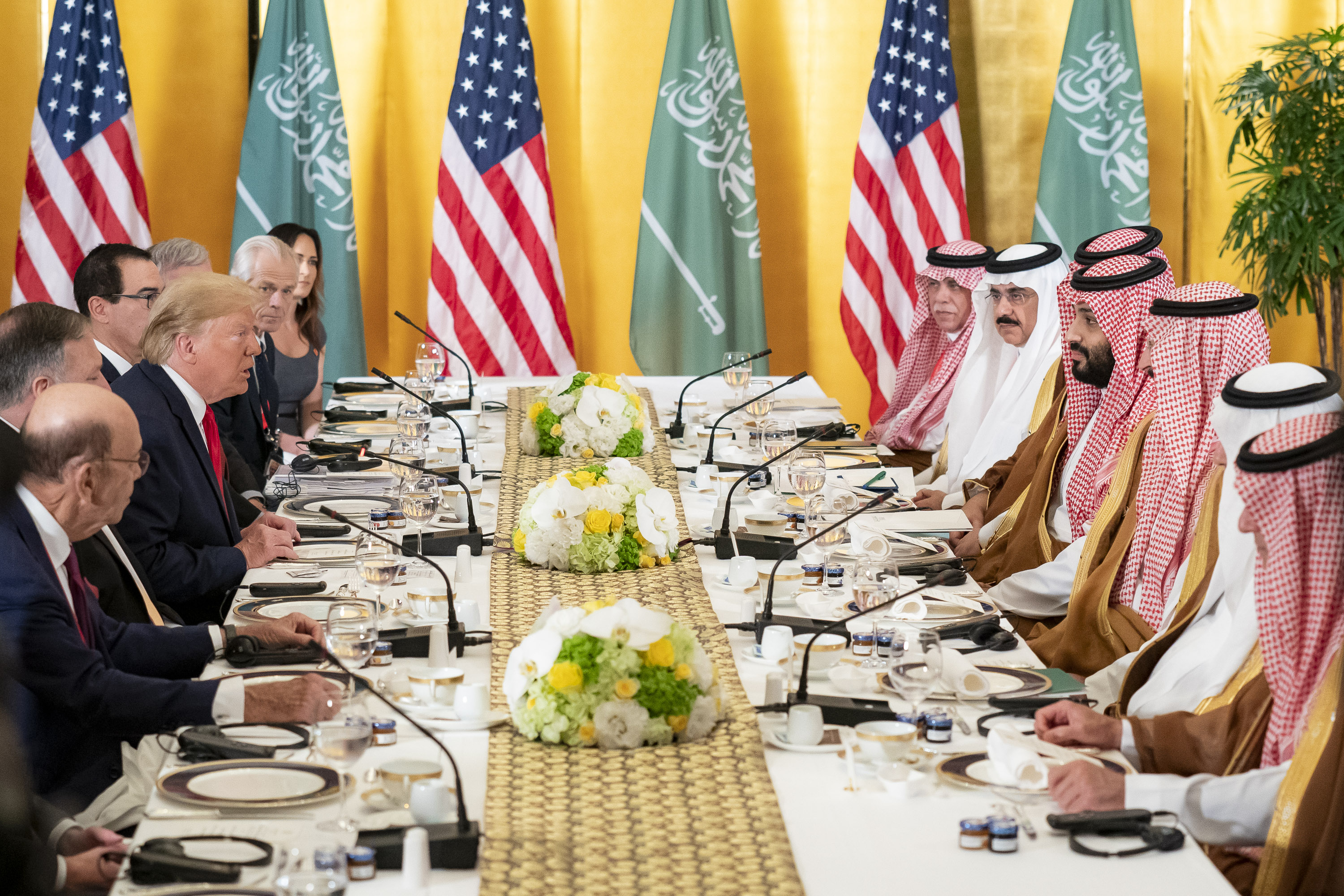
U.S. President Donald Trump with Saudi Crown Prince Mohammad bin Salman in June 2019

President Richard Nixon cancelled the fixed-rate convertibility of US dollars to gold in 1971. Nixon and his Secretary of State, Henry Kissinger, feared that the abandonment of the international gold standard under the Bretton Woods arrangement (combined with a growing U.S. trade deficit, and massive debt associated with the ongoing Vietnam War) would cause a decline in the relative global demand for the U.S. dollar. In a series of meetings, the United States and the Saudi royal family made an agreement. The United States would offer military protection for Saudi Arabia's oil fields, and in return the Saudi's would price their oil sales exclusively in United States dollars (in other words, the Saudis were to refuse all other currencies, except the U.S. dollar, as payment for their oil exports).

In 1998, about 40% of the energy consumed by the United States came from oil. The United States is responsible for 25% of the world's oil consumption, while having only 3% of the world's proven oil reserves and less than 5% of the world's population. In January 1980, President Jimmy Carter explicitly declared: "An attempt by any outside force to gain control of the Persian Gulf region will be regarded as an assault on the vital interests of the United States."

=== Venezuela ===
According to the Oil and Gas Journal (OGJ), Venezuela has 77.2 billion barrels (1.227×10^{10} m^{3}) of proven conventional oil reserves, the largest of any country in the Western Hemisphere. In addition it has non-conventional oil deposits similar in size to Canada's - at 1,200 billion barrels (1.9×10^{11} m^{3}) approximately equal to the world's reserves of conventional oil. About 267 billion barrels (4.24×10^{10} m^{3}) of this may be producible at current prices using current technology. Venezuela's Orinoco tar sands are less viscous than Canada's Athabasca oil sands – meaning they can be produced by more conventional means, but are buried deeper – meaning they cannot be extracted by surface mining. In an attempt to have these extra heavy oil reserves recognized by the international community, Venezuela has moved to add them to its conventional reserves to give nearly 350 billion barrels (5.6×10^{10} m^{3}) of total oil reserves. This would give it the largest oil reserves in the world, even ahead of Saudi Arabia.

Venezuela nationalized its oil industry in 1975–1976, creating Petróleos de Venezuela S.A. (PdVSA), the country's state-run oil and natural gas company. Along with being Venezuela's largest employer, PdVSA accounts for about one-third of the country's GDP, 50 percent of the government's revenue and 80 percent of Venezuela's exports earnings. In recent years, under the influence of President Chavez, the Venezuelan government has reduced PdVSA's previous autonomy and amended the rules regulating the country's hydrocarbons sector.

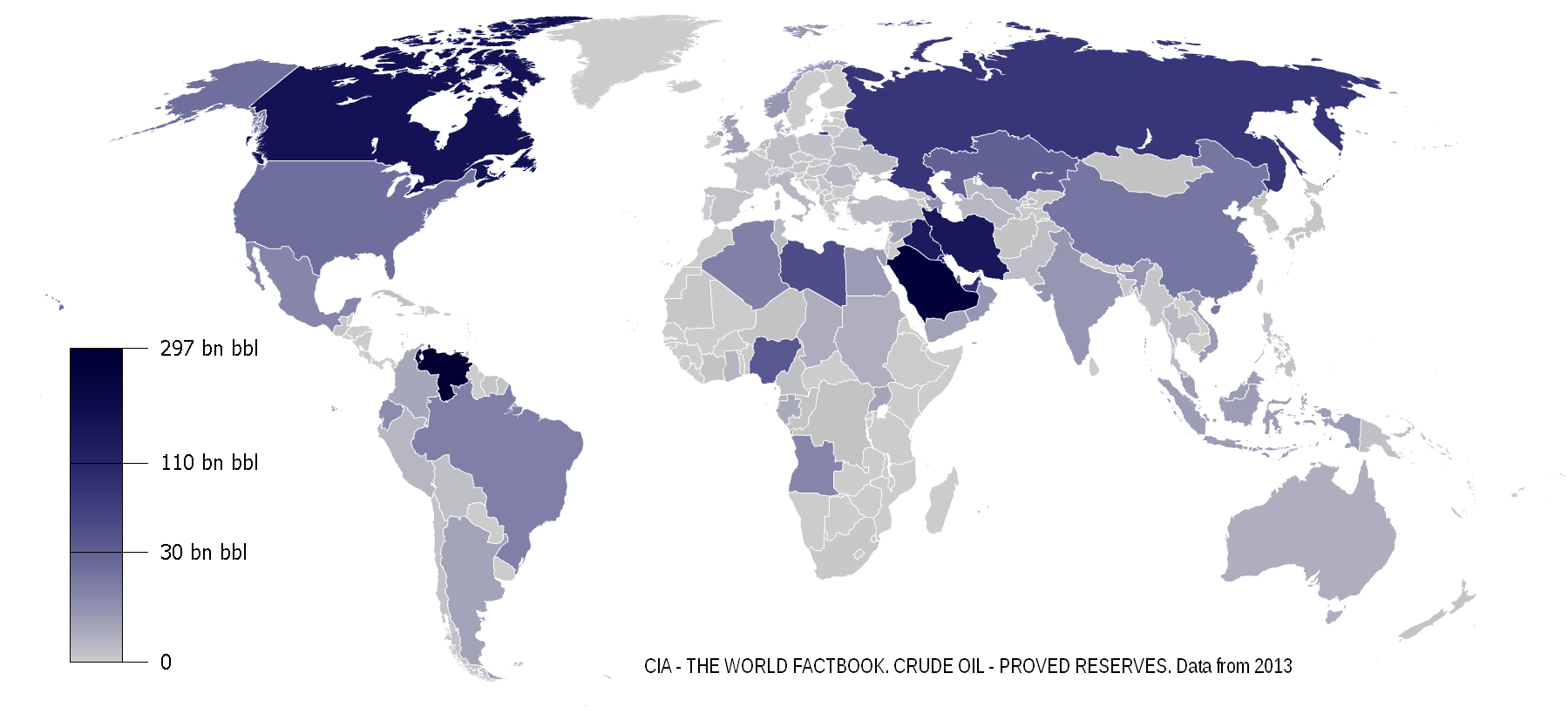
Proven world oil reserves, 2013

In the 1990s, Venezuela opened its upstream oil sector to private investment. This collection of policies, called apertura, facilitated the creation of 32 operating service agreements (OSA) with 22 separate foreign oil companies, including international oil majors like Chevron, BP, Total, and Repsol-YPF. Hugo Chávez, the President of Venezuela sharply diverged from previous administrations' economic policies. PDVSA is now used as a cash-cow and as an employer-of-last-resort; foreign oil businesses were nationalised and the government refused to pay compensation.

Estimates of Venezuelan oil production vary. Venezuela claims its oil production is over 3 million barrels per day (480,000 m^{3}/d), but oil industry analysts and the U.S. Energy Information Administration believe it to be much lower. In addition to other reporting irregularities, much of its production is extra-heavy oil, which may or may not be included with conventional oil in the various production estimates. The U.S. Energy Information Agency estimated Venezuela's oil production in December 2006 was only 2.5 million barrels per day (400,000 m^{3}/d), a 24% decline from its peak of 3.3 million in 1997.

Recently, Venezuela has pushed the creation of regional oil initiatives for the Caribbean (Petrocaribe), the Andean region (Petroandino), and South America (Petrosur), and Latin America (Petroamerica). The initiatives include assistance for oil developments, investments in refining capacity, and preferential oil pricing. The most developed of these three is the Petrocaribe initiative, with 13 nations signing a preliminary agreement in 2005. Under Petrocaribe, Venezuela will offer crude oil and petroleum products to Caribbean nations under preferential terms and prices, with Jamaica as the first nation to sign on in August 2005.

== See also ==
- Chronology of world oil market events
- Energy politics
- Energy superpower
- Fossil fuels lobby
- Geostrategy in Central Asia
- Antonia Juhasz
- The New Great Game
- Oil reserves
- Oil Shockwave
- Petrodollar recycling
- Shanghai Cooperation Organisation
- Society of Petroleum Engineers
