= Independent Power Corporation =

Independent Power Corporation PLC
- Company type: Public Limited Company
- Industry: Electricity and Natural Gas Utility
- Founded: 1995
- Headquarters: London, U.K.
- Key people: Peter Earl, CEO

Independent Power Corporation PLC (IPC) is a low carbon independent power producer (IPP) based in Millbank Tower.

It develops, owns, and operates thermal and hydropower generation facilities in Latin America, North America, Middle East, South Africa, Asia, and Europe. In recent years the company has been pursuing hybrid solar and wind projects.

The company also provides operations and maintenance services for generation and distribution assets, acting as technical operator for power plants worldwide.

Its projects include Hybrid solar and wind, coal-fired, gas-fired, diesel-fired, and hydroelectric power plants.

== History ==
IPC was founded in 1995 by Peter Earl and Lord Colin Moynihan, former energy secretary under Margaret Thatcher. The company's aim was to act as principal in the privatisation of energy companies in emerging markets.

In June 1996, the Company entered into a partnership with Public Service Company of Colorado (now part of Xcel Energy) to act as the international development arm of its then parent company, New Century Energies (“NCE”). An additional partner, Florida Progress Corporation, Inc. joined the partnership in 1997. At the same time, IPC also formed a partnership with Phillips Petroleum, Inc. for LNG based power projects in China and Brazil as Phillips considered the possible expansion into power developments. This involved developing new, greenfield power plants and so from 1998, IPC became a developer of new-build power plants.

In 2001, IPC came back under 100% British ownership, completely independent of US energy companies following the management buy-out of Xcel Energy’s 49 per cent stake in the company. IPC also incorporated its O&M subsidiary, Independent Power Operations Limited.

In the first eight years, IPC developed, or acquired, power assets for re-sale to third parties, focusing on Central Asia, Latin America and North America. After 2004 IPC spun off two regional power companies which were floated on the AIM Market of the London Stock Exchange: Rurelec PLC, specialising in Latin American power projects, floated in 2004, and IPSA Group PLC, which focused on power development in Southern Africa, floated in 2005.

IPC also worked with Rolls-Royce and the United Kingdom’s Department of Trade and Industry (DTI) from 2004 on power plant feasibility studies in territories of importance to the British Government including Belize, Kazakhstan, South Africa and Uruguay.

=== Latin America ===
By 2007 IPC was involved with 2,500 megawatts of gas-fired development projects, 400 megawatts of coal-fired combined heat and power projects, and 150 megawatts of ‘combined cycle’ upgrade projects and managing a gas-powered plant on behalf of BP in Latin America.

In 2010 the British private investment company Sterling Trust Limited acquired IPC together with its shares in Rurelec and IPSA Group.

In 2013 IPC was incorporated into Rurelec to undertake early stage development work on projects in Chile, Argentina, Bolivia and Peru, including a hydroelectric power project, Canchayllo as part of IPC's move into developing renewable energy generation. IPC and Rurelec acquired 50% of Central Illapa, a 250MW power plant in Chile.

In July 2015 IPC was re-acquired by Peter Earl and was no longer a subsidiary of Rurelec PLC.

=== Africa ===
Also in 2009, IPC began its work in Ras Al Khaimah, operating a 45 megawatt open cycle gas power plant, Al Hamra 1

It undertook other projects in Western and Northern Africa, providing development and financial modelling services to power generation groups. It qualified with the government of Egypt as a recognised EPC contractor and provider of power plant engineering services and was deemed eligible to participate in Egypt’s gas fired power plant programme. Two projects in Ghana, Takoradi in the west and PramPram in the east, were also started.

In 2017, IPC signed an agreement with Australian Tlou Energy to develop a 100 megawatt power plant for the Lesedi coal bed methane project. In April 2017, QG Power Africa was established as a joint venture between IPC, QG Africa Mezzanine LP and Tomé International AG to develop power assets across sub-Saharan Africa.

=== Asia ===
In 2002, IPC bought the company Karaganda Regional Electricity, as a subsidiary to operate in Kazakhstan.

In November 2015 IPC announced a memorandum of understanding with a state Kazakh firm, KazTransGas, on $3 billion USD worth of gas pipeline and power plant projects to allow the gas to trade in Chinese and Mongolian markets, as well as provide gas for Kazakh industrial centres.

== Directors ==
Chief Executive Officer: Peter Earl

Directors: Yuri Goligorsky, Peter Earl
