= Uzen oil field =

Oil field in Mangystau Province, Kazakhstan

Uzen Oil Field
- Country: Kazakhstan
- Region: Mangystau Province
- Offshore/onshore: Onshore
- Coordinates: 43.6886°N 51.3048°E
- Operator: KazMunayGas

Field history
- Discovery: 1961
- Start of development: 1961
- Start of production: 1965

Production
- Current production of oil: 100,000 barrels per day (~5.0×10^{6} t/a)
- Estimated oil in place: 201 million tonnes (~ 240×10^{6} m^{3} or 1500 million bbl)

The Uzen Oil Field is an oil field located in Mangystau Region, Kazakhstan. It was discovered in 1961 and developed by KazMunayGas. The oil field is operated and owned by KazMunayGas. The total proven reserves of the Uzen oil field are around 1,500,000,000 barrels (240,000,000 m^{3}) (201 million tonnes), and production is centered on 100,000 barrels per day (16,000 m^{3}/d).
