= Amangel'dy gas field =

Gas field in Almaty Province, Kazakhstan

- Country: Kazakhstan
- Region: Almaty Province
- Offshore/onshore: onshore
- Coordinates: 44°20′12″N 71°5′17″E
- Operator: KazMunayGas

Field history
- Discovery: 2000
- Start of development: 2001
- Start of production: 2003

Production
- Current production of gas: 1.9×10^{6} m^{3}/d 66.5×10^{6} cu ft/d 0.7×10^{9} m^{3}/a (25×10^{9} cu ft/a)
- Estimated gas in place: 50×10^{9} m^{3} 1.783×10^{12} cu ft

The Amangel'dy gas field is a natural gas field located in Almaty Province. It was discovered in 2000 and developed by KazMunayGas. The total proven reserves of the Amangel'dy gas field are around 1.78 trillion cubic feet (50 billion m^{3}), and production is centered on 66.5 million cubic feet/day (1.9 million m^{3}).
