= China–Turkmenistan relations =

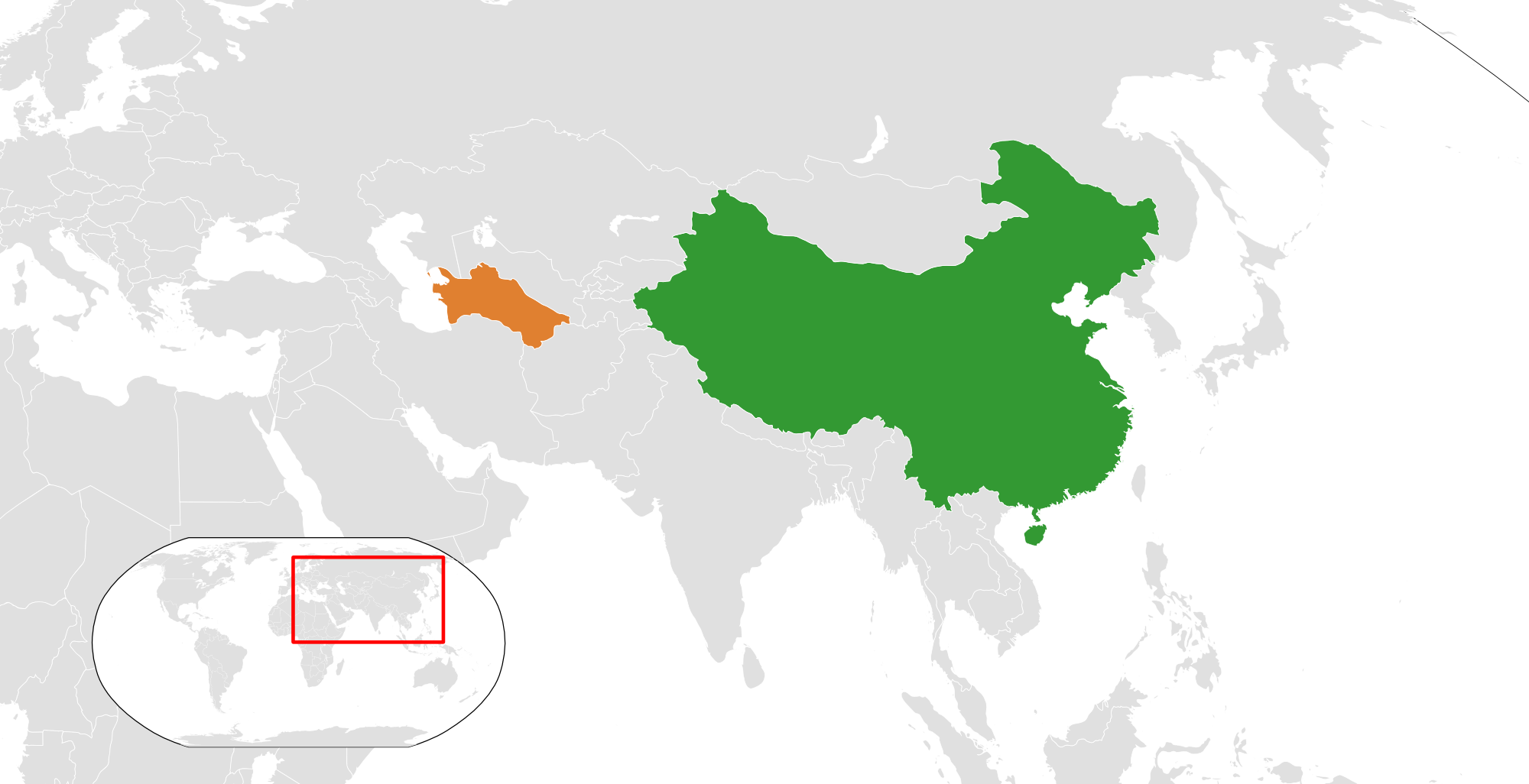
- China: Turkmenistan

China–Turkmenistan relations are the bilateral relationship between China and Turkmenistan. An official diplomatic relationship was established between the countries on January 6, 1992. China has an embassy in Ashgabat and Turkmenistan has an embassy in Beijing.

== Historical context ==
Chinese relations with Central Asia dates back to the Silk Road, a network of trade routes starting in the second century BCE.

In October 1991, Turkmenistan declared independence following the dissolution of the Soviet Union. Under the presidency of Saparmurat Niyazov, Turkmenistan's foreign policy remained neutral. Turkmenistan's president Gurbanguly Berdimuhamedov maintained authoritarian control on rights concerning speech, religious expression, and foreign tourism. Post-Soviet Central Asian countries, including Turkmenistan, are incentivized to pursue diplomatic and economic relations with China due to the opportunity of investment and exports, and China stands to gain access to raw materials, which Turkmenistan is able to produce in abundance. China and Central Asia broadly both have moved to contain Islamic and democratic sentiments. Such intersecting economic needs and political interests suggest that maintaining strong political and economic ties are of substantial importance to both China and Turkmenistan.

== Political relations ==
Turkmenistan follows the one China principle, and recognizes government of the People's Republic of China as the sole legal government representing the whole of China and Taiwan as "an inalienable part" of China. Turkmenistan also supports all efforts by the PRC to "achieve national reunification" and opposes Taiwan independence.

=== Instances of diplomacy ===
On August 31, 1998, Turkmenistan President Niyazov visited China for a meeting with Chinese President Jiang Zemin. During this meeting, the Chinese government expressed gratitude towards Turkmenistan for vocalizing support for China in regards to Taiwan, and praised their economic and political stability.

In April 2006, President Niyazov held and Chinese President Hu Jintao held talks in Beijing, during which they expressed satisfaction over beneficial cooperation in the areas of trade, transportation, energy, and culture. Both parties expressed desires for further cooperative development in chemical, textile, and telecommunication industries, as well as in culture, education, and tourism. Niyazov expressed support for the one-China policy, while Hu reified China's support for Turkmenistan's foreign neutrality policy. Both parties also acknowledged vested interest in combatting terrorism, separatism, and extremism. This meeting marked the beginning of an intense cooperative relationship between the two countries, in which both countries establish agreement on not only cultural and humanitarian ends, but economic pursuits as well.

Both countries would continue to engage in trade and diplomacy, notably in May 2010, the People's Republic of China sent a delegation of Chinese officials to Ashgabat. During the meeting, officials emphasized interest in pursuing Sino-Turkmen cooperation in the fields of culture and education.

In November 2013, Chinese and Turkmen officials met in Beijing to discuss increased cooperation between the two countries on the issues of regional stability and development, following the signing of an agreement a few months prior. During this meeting, Turkmen Defense Minister Begenc Gundogdiyev expressed interest in military cooperation with China in terms of military technology and personnel training.

In June 2016, Turkmenistan's Foreign Ministry, and an envoy on behalf of China's Foreign Ministry on Afghan affairs, Deng Xijun, attended a meeting in Ashgabat in which the parties established aligning agendas in terms of regional peace, security, and development. Both parties emphasized the importance of establishing regular communication between each country's respective foreign ministry in order to further develop joint efforts on shared political agendas within the region, as well as economic collaboration.

In July 2019, UN ambassadors of 37 countries, including Turkmenistan, signed a joint letter to the United Nations Human Rights Council defending China's persecution of Uyghurs. Turkmenistan was one of 16 countries that defended China in 2019 but did not do so in 2020.

In July 2022, Turkmenistan and Chinese officials conducted a video conference for the purpose of discussing further cooperation on security in Afghanistan. During the meeting, officials on behalf of both sides reviewed the progress made by the Turkmen-Chinese Committee on Cooperation, and emphasized the importance of ensuring peace and development in Afghanistan as part of a larger effort of securing economic, social, and humanitarian international interests.

In November 2023, the China-Turkmenistan Cooperation Committee held the first meeting for their Science and Technology Cooperation sub-committee. At this meeting China, and Turkmenistan announced their intentions to further cooperative efforts on the frontiers of science and technology by promoting integration between their respective research institutions and enterprises. The specific fields of interests at the center of such efforts are nanotechnology, the development of new materials, the processing of natural resources, biomedicine, seismology, the development of information and communications technology, and social sciences.

As an extension of joint humanitarian work, In May 2024 a meeting was held between Dunyagozel Gulmanova, Speaker of Parliament of Turkmenistan, and Shen Yueyue, Vice Chairperson of The National Committee of the Chinese People's Political Consultative Conference in Ashgabat. During this meeting, officials held discussions on the legislative reforms underway, and the importance of parliamentary negotiations as a means of integrating consideration to Turkmen-Chinese cooperation on a legislative level. Both countries established dialogue on key reformist issues, specifically women's rights.

In January 2025, an Assistant Foreign Minister of China, Liu Bin, attended a meeting with the Foreign Affairs Minister of Turkmenistan Rashid Meredov, in which both parties reaffirmed intentions for enduring and extensive collaboration in several fields of interest: energy, transportation, communication, culture, and humanitarianism.

== Economic relations ==
China is by far Turkmenistan's largest trading partner. In 2020, the China exports to Turkmenistan were valued at $445 US million and Turkmenistan exports to China were valued at $5.3 US billion. In 2022, China accounted for 65% of Turkmenistan's total trade.

=== Energy ===
Turkmenistan exports significant amounts of natural gas to China, with more than half of these exports going through the Central Asia–China gas pipeline. The pipeline project allowed Turkmenistan to significantly decrease its previous dependence on Russia; previously, nearly 70% of Turkmenistan's gas exports transited through Russian pipelines.

On 3 April 2006, China and Turkmenistan signed a framework agreement on a potential pipeline construction and long-term gas supply. In June 2007, during his visit to China, Turkmeni President Gurbanguly Berdimuhamedow signed an accord to speed up implementation of the Turkmeni-Chinese gas pipeline project. In July 2007, it was formally announced that Turkmenistan will join the original Kazakhstan–China oil pipeline project. The whole pipeline was inaugurated on 14 December 2009.

==== Energy diplomacy ====
During a meeting in Ashgabat in November 2011, Turkmen President Berdimuhammadov expressed that Turkmenistan was working on increasing output of gas to China.

In September 2013, China and Turkmenistan signed a joint agreement pledging their commitment as long-term partners in energy. The agreement included a guarantee of the annual transportation of 65 billion cubic meters of gas to China by 2016 through the Turkmeni-Chinese gas pipeline.

In January 2019, China refused to continue export of military arms to Turkmenistan in response to a substantial decrease in imports of gas.

In October 2024, Turkmenistan and China held a meeting in which they discussed furthering investment efforts between each other in the general fields of energy, infrastructure, and the innovation of green energy and minerals. China was also updated on Turkmen progress in the industries of oil, gas, transportation, and chemicals.

== Public opinion ==
As of 2026, public opinion of China in Turkmenistan has trended favorably, with surveys showing high support for Chinese investment, infrastructure projects, and technology. Support for Chinese energy and infrastructure exceeds 90%. Younger people in Turkmenistan tend to have more favorable views of China than people in older age cohorts.

== Resident diplomatic missions ==
- China has an embassy in Ashgabat.
- Turkmenistan has an embassy in Beijing.

== See also ==
- Foreign relations of China
- Foreign relations of Turkmenistan
