= Kumkol oil field =

Oil field in Kyzylorda, Kazakhstan

Coordinates: 46°13′47″N 65°17′15″E

Kumkol Oil Field
- Kazakhstan's stamp "25 years of the Kumkol deposit"
- Country: Kazakhstan
- Region: Kyzylorda Province
- Offshore/onshore: onshore
- Operator: PetroKazakhstan

Field history
- Discovery: 2008
- Start of development: 2008
- Start of production: 2009

Production
- Current production of oil: 78,000 barrels per day (~3.9×10^{6} t/a)
- Estimated oil in place: 41 million tonnes (~ 50×10^{6} m^{3} or 300 million bbl)

Kumkol Oil Field is an oil field located in Kyzylorda Province, 200 kilometers from the town of Kyzylorda. It was discovered in 2008 and developed by PetroKazakhstan, which owns and operates the oil field. The total proven reserves of the Kumkol oil field are around 300 million barrels (41 million tonnes), and production is centered on 78,000 barrels per day (12,400 m^{3}/d).
