= KazTransGas =

Kazakhstani state-owned gas transportation company

- Company type: State-owned enterprise
- Industry: Natural gas transportation
- Founded: 2000
- Headquarters: Astana, Kazakhstan
- Area served: Kazakhstan, Russia, China, Central Asia
- Key people: Kairat Sharipbaev (Chairman)
- Products: Natural gas
- Services: Gas transportation, gas distribution
- Owner: KazMunayGas
- Parent: KazMunayGas

KazTransGas is a Kazakhstani state-owned natural gas transportation company headquartered in Astana. It is a subsidiary of the national oil and gas company KazMunayGas. It is the largest gas supply company in Kazakhstan, representing the state's interests in both the domestic and international gas markets.

== History ==
KazTransGas was founded in 2000 as a subsidiary of KazMunayGas to manage Kazakhstan's natural gas pipeline infrastructure. The company is responsible for the operation and development of the country's gas pipeline network, which transports natural gas from production fields to domestic consumers and for export.

In 2006, KazTransGas acquired Tbilisi, a gas distributor. However, in 2009, the management rights of the company were transferred away by the Georgian Government. In March 2018, Georgian Industrial Group announced its acquisition of KazTransGas Tbilisi, a subsidiary company of KazTransGas, for $40 million. In December 1, 2015, it launched the third branch of the Kazakhstan-China gas pipeline, completing the project and reaching its full capacity of 55 billion cubic meters per year.

On May 12, 2023, KazTransGas Aimak launched a 60-kilometer underground high-pressure gas pipeline in the Mangystau Region, connecting Kuryk village with Sarsha and the Warm Beach resort near Aktau to support resort development and address regional water scarcity.

== Operations ==
KazTransGas operates a vast network of natural gas pipelines throughout Kazakhstan, including major transmission pipelines and distribution networks. It is the sole operator of the country's gas transportation system and facilitates the transit of natural gas to neighbouring countries such as Russia, China, and Central Asia.

The Kazakhstan section of Bukhara–Tashkent–Bishkek–Almaty pipeline is operated by KazTransGas.

In December 2015, KazTransGas completed the third branch (C branch) of the Kazakhstan-China gas pipeline, adding to a total capacity of 55 billion cubic meters per year. The 1,303-kilometer pipeline project employed over 4,000 specialists and received $1.2 billion in state funding from 2008 to 2015. It forms part of the larger 7,500-kilometer Turkmenistan-Uzbekistan-Kazakhstan-China pipeline, traversing South Kazakhstan, Zhambyl, and Almaty regions.

== Allegations ==
In December 2020, following the appointment of Kairat Sharipbaev as chairman of KazTransGas, Sharipbaev faced allegations of potential Conflict of interest. An investigation by Radio Free Europe/Radio Liberty (RFE/RL) reported on indirect ties between Sharipbaev and companies that subsequently received major contracts from KazTransGas and the Government of Kazakhstan. A key point of contention was the awarding of an $860 million contract to construct a gas processing plant to GPC Investment, a firm with reported links to a business associate of Sharipbaev. The report further raised concerns about the selection process, which favored GPC Investment over established international energy companies.
