= PetroKazakhstan =

Canadian oil company

PetroKazakhstan is a Canadian oil company, based in Calgary, Alberta, that has all of its business focused on Kazakhstan where it had some 550 million barrels (87,000,000 m^{3}) of oil and 25 billion cubic feet (710,000,000 m^{3}) of natural gas reserves (January 2005 estimate) in the Turgai basin region. These are the second largest Kazakhstani proven reserves after ChevronTexaco's TengizChevroil. Estimated production is 165,000 barrels (26,200 m^{3}) of oil per day. In 2005, PetroKazakhstan was acquired by China National Petroleum Corporation and then in 2006 transferred to PetroChina.

== Origins - Hurricane ==
Formerly known as Hurricane Hydrocarbons Ltd. the company was founded in 1981 and initially operated in Western Canada. It changed to a more international focus and grew after making several major oil and gas finds in Southern Kazakhstan, in 1991 becoming a partner in a JV to develop the Kyzylkiya, Aryskum, Maibulak and South Kumkol fields.

In 1996, it purchased Yuzhneftegaz from the Kazakh government, making it one of the largest players in the country.

However, the company ran into severe problems in the late 1990s. All the company's oil went through refineries owned by Central Asian Industrial Holdings N.V. (CAIH), a Dutch-registered offshore affiliate of Kazkommertsbank (KKB) Kazakhstan's leading banking group, which used their monopoly to charge high prices. At the same time, oil prices plunged. In 1999 the company was granted creditor protection under the Companies Creditors Arrangement Act by order of the Court of Queen's Bench in Calgary and its finances were eventually restructured such that its business operations continued.

The company was saved by Bernard Isautier, a board member who had long been involved in the Canadian oil industry and in Central Asia. He became CEO and negotiated a merger with Central Asian Industrial Holdings N.V. From mid-October 1999 to 2000 Hurricane acquired 88.4% of OJSC Shymkentnefteorgsintez (now PetroKazakhstan Oil Products LLP) which owns the 160,000 bpd Shymkent Oil Refinery, the most modern of the country's three refineries (commissioned 1985). In doing so, Isautier put 30% of Hurricane's stock in CAIH's hands. This eventually made the investors in both companies very wealthy, especially Isautier who had demanded no salary and was at first only paid in stock options. The rapid increase in the stock's value made Isautier by far the most generously compensated executive in Canada in 2004.

== Renamed PetroKazakhstan ==
In 2003 Hurricane was renamed PetroKazakhstan to reflect that its entire operations are in that country.

In the following years Hurricane/PetroKazakhstan saw considerable conflict with the government of Kazakhstan, including a fine for anti-competitive behaviour and protests of its environmental and labour record reportedly organized by government agents. In June 2005 PetroKazakhstan announced that it had been approached for a possible takeover or merger, sending stock prices up significantly. The most frequently mentioned possible suitor was a branch of India's ONGC. The stock quickly fell back down when the government of Kazakhstan announced that it would demand the right to acquire PetroKazakhstan prior to any merger, in part because India would have to export their oil through Russia, thus increasing Kazakhstan’s dependence on Russia.

== CNPC and PetroChina ==
On 21 August 2005 China National Petroleum Corporation (CNPC), agreed to buy the company for US$4.18 billion via CNPC International Ltd. (CNPCI), a 100% subsidiary of China National Oil & Gas Exploration and Development Corp. (CNODC). This made the PetroKazakhstan deal the largest overseas acquisition by a Chinese company. PetroKazakhstan was delisted in Kazakhstan, Toronto, New York, London and Frankfurt Stock Exchanges.

As part of the deal with CNPC, on 15 October 2005, according to the Law of the Republic of Kazakhstan On Subsoil Use, CNPC agreed to sell back 33% of the shares of PetroKazakhstan Inc. to KazMunaiGas (KMG), a transaction which was completed on 5 July 2006. Further on 6 July 2007 KMG bought back a 50% share in PetroKazakhstan subsidiary PetroKazakhstan Oil Products LLP [PKOP) thereby allowing the Kazakh government to regain an equal share of the nation's most modern oil refinery.

In 2006 CNPC transferred its remaining 67% of shares to China Petroleum Engineering & Construction Company (CPECC), a 50/50 joint venture with its own listed subsidiary PetroChina, who currently manage and operate the company.

== See also ==
- Shanghai Cooperation Organisation – of which Kazakhstan and China are both members
