= Bukhara–Tashkent–Bishkek–Almaty pipeline =

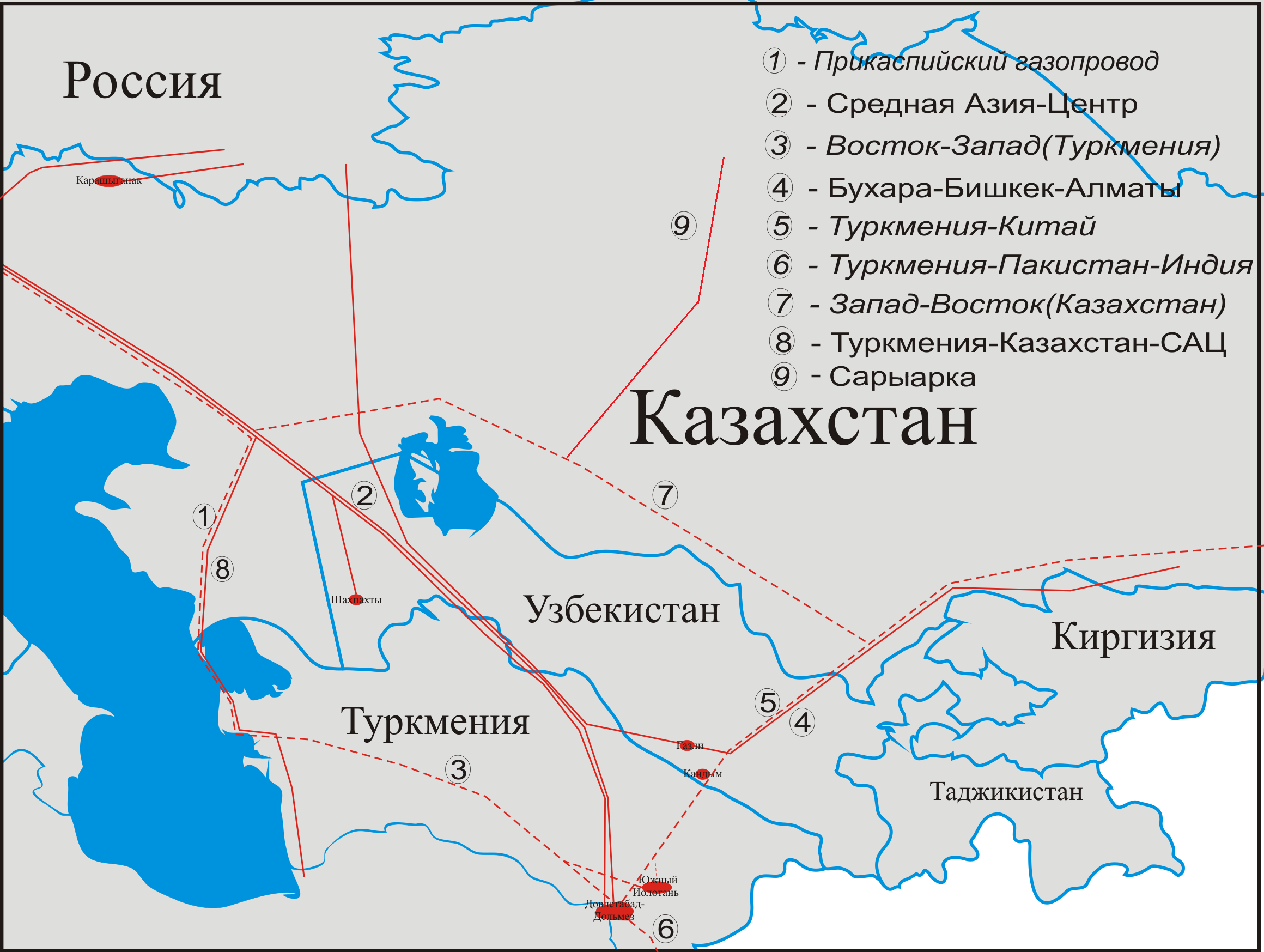
- Location of Bukhara–Tashkent–Bishkek–Almaty pipeline

Location
- Country: Uzbekistan, Kyrgyzstan, Kazakhstan
- Direction: west–east
- Start: Bukhara, Uzbekistan
- Passes through: Tashkent, Shymkent, Taraz, Bishkek
- To: Almaty, Kazakhstan

General information
- Type: natural gas
- Partners: Uzbekneftegas, Kyrgyzgas, KazMunayGas
- Operator: Uzbekneftegas, KyrKazGas, KazTransGas
- Commissioned: 1971

Technical information
- Maximum discharge: 22 billion cubic meters

The Bukhara–Tashkent–Bishkek–Almaty pipeline is Uzbekistan's main natural gas export pipeline.

== History ==
Construction of the pipeline started in 1967. The pipeline reached Tashkent in 1968, Bishkek (then Frunze) in 1970 and Almaty in 1971.

== Description ==
The diameter of the pipeline is 1,020 millimetres (40 in) and its annual capacity is almost 22 billion cubic meter (bcm) of natural gas. The Bukhara–Tashkent–Bishkek–Almaty pipeline is the main source of gas supply for Kyrgyzstan and southern part of Kazakhstan. It is possible that the pipeline will be connected with the planned Central Asia-China gas pipeline.

== Operators ==
The Kazakhstan section of pipeline is operated by KazTransGas, a wholly owned subsidiary of KazMunayGas. The Kyrgyzstan section of the pipeline is operated by KyrKazGas, the joint venture of KazTransGas and Kyrgyzgas.

== Future developments ==
The technical condition of the pipeline is alarming, particularly in Kyrgyzstan. Therefore, there are plans for construction of a second trunk gas pipeline and renovation of the existing pipeline.
