= Kazakhstan–China oil pipeline =

Oil pipeline in Asia

Location
- Country: Kazakhstan, China
- Direction: West–east
- Start: Atyrau
- Passes through: Aktobe, Kenkiyak, Kumkol, Zhanaarka
- To: Alashankou

General information
- Type: Oil
- Partners: China National Petroleum Corporation, KazMunayGas

Technical information
- Length: 2,228 km (1,384 mi)
- Maximum discharge: 20 million tonnes per year

The Kazakhstan–China oil pipeline is China's first direct oil import pipeline allowing oil import from Central Asia. It runs from Kazakhstan's Caspian shore to Xinjiang in China. The pipeline is owned by the China National Petroleum Corporation and the Kazakh state-owned oil company KazMunayGas.

== History ==
The construction of pipeline was agreed between China and Kazakhstan in 1997. Kazakhstan proposed the pipeline, which became the first to run to China from any Central Asian country.

The first section of pipeline from the Aktobe region's oil fields to Atyrau was completed in 2003. The construction of the pipeline from Zhanaarka (former Atasu) to Alashankou started in September 2004 and was completed in December 2005. The construction of the Kenkiyak–Kumkol section was agreed between Kazakhstan and China on 18 August 2007. This section was completed on 11 July 2009.

The pipeline was developed by the China National Petroleum Corporation and the Kazakh oil company KazMunayGas.

Currently capacity is at 14 million tons per year. The pipeline is expected to reach nominal capacity of 20 million tons per year in 2014.

== Technical description ==
The 2,228 kilometres (1,384 mi) long pipeline runs from Atyrau in Kazakhstan to Alashankou in China's Xinjiang. The Kenkiyak-Atyrau section of the pipeline is 449 kilometres (279 mi) long and has a capacity of 120 thousand barrels per day (~6.0×10^{6} t/a). Capacity of the pipeline maybe upgraded to 180 thousand barrels per day (~9.0×10^{6} t/a) in the future. The pipeline was built and is operated by MunaiTas a joint venture between the China National Petroleum Corporation and KazMunayGas.

The Zhanaarka-Alashankou section of the pipeline cost US$700 million. It is 987 kilometres (613 mi) long and has a capacity of 200 thousand barrels per day (~1.0×10^{7} t/a). Capacity of this section might be upgraded to 400 thousand barrels per day (~2.0×10^{7} t/a) by 2011. The pipeline includes an oil metering station at the Alataw Pass. The pipeline was built and is operated by a joint venture between CNODC and KazTrans Oil JSC. The first oil through this pipeline reached the refinery in August 2006.

The Kenkiyak-Kumkol section is 792 kilometres (492 mi) long. It has initial transportation capacity of 10 million tons per year. This section has reached its full capacity in 2011.

== Alashankou–Dushanzi Crude Oil Pipeline ==
In Alashankou, the pipeline is connected with the Alashankou–Dushanzi Crude Oil Pipeline, which is a 246 kilometres (153 mi) long pipeline connecting the Kazakhstan–China oil pipeline with Dushanzi District. The capacity of pipeline is 10 million tons of oil per year and it supplies mainly the Dushanzi refinery. The pipeline became operational on 21 December 2005 and the first oil through this pipeline reached to the refinery on 29 July 2006. The pipeline is constructed and operated by the China National Petroleum Corporation.

== Oil supplies ==
The Kazakhstan–China oil pipeline is supplied from the Aktobe region's fields and from the Kumkol oil field. In the future, the main supply source will be Kashagan field. The pipeline is used also for the transportation of oil from Russia's western Siberia by connection with the Omsk (Russia)–Pavlodar (Kazakhstan)–Shymkent–Türkmenabat (Turkmenistan) pipeline in Zhanaarka oil terminal. Oil is transported through this pipeline by Russian companies TNK-BP and Gazprom Neft.

== See also ==
- Central Asia – China gas pipeline
- Eastern Siberia – Pacific Ocean oil pipeline
- Lanzhou–Zhengzhou–Changsha product oil pipeline
