= Central Asia–China gas pipeline =

Natural gas pipeline in Asia

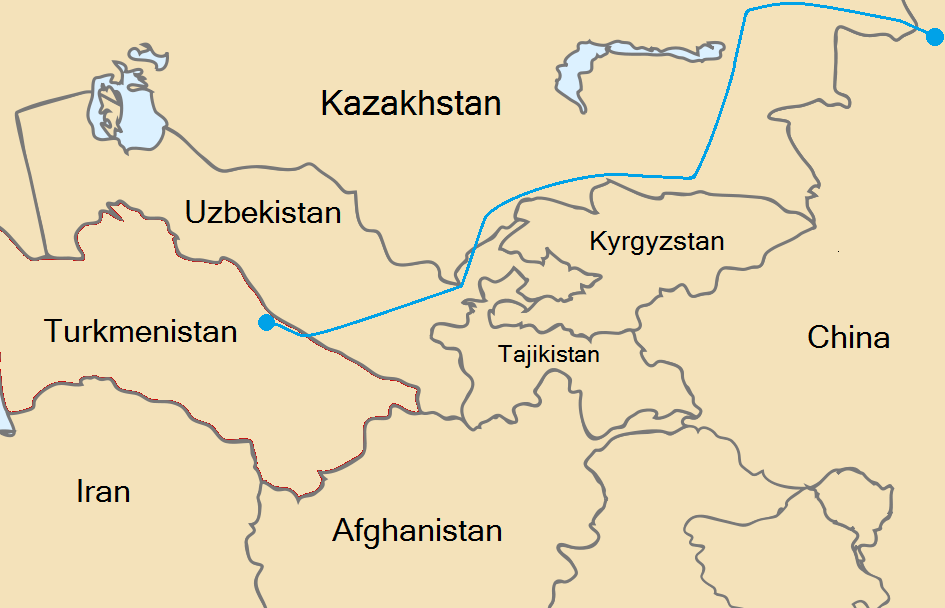
- The route of the gas pipeline

Location
- Country: Turkmenistan, Uzbekistan, Kazakhstan, China
- Direction: south–north-east
- Start: Right bank of Amu Darya, Saman-Depe, Turkmenistan
- Passes through: Olot, Shymkent, Alataw Pass
- To: Horgos, Xinjiang, People's Republic of China (connected to West–East Gas Pipeline)
- Runs alongside: Bukhara–Tashkent–Bishkek–Almaty pipeline, Kazakhstan-China oil pipeline

General information
- Type: natural gas
- Partners: China National Petroleum Corporation; Türkmengaz; Uzbekneftegas; KazMunayGas
- Construction started: 2007
- Commissioned: 2009

Technical information
- Length: 1,833 km (1,139 mi)
- Maximum discharge: 55 billion cubic metres per annum (1.9×10^{12} cu ft/a)
- Diameter: 1,067 mm (42 in)

The Central Asia–China gas pipeline (known also as the Turkmenistan–China gas pipeline) is a natural gas pipeline system from Central Asia to Xinjiang in the People's Republic of China. By connecting Turkmenistan to China's domestic grid, this pipeline makes it possible to transport gas some 7,000 kilometres (4,300 mi) from Turkmenistan to Shanghai. More than half of Turkmen natural gas exports are delivered to China through the pipeline.

== History ==
The initial proposal for the Central Asia–China gas pipeline was presented as the Kazakhstan–China gas pipeline, which was to follow along the Kazakhstan–China oil pipeline. In June 2003, during China's leader Hu Jintao's visit to Kazakhstan, agreements to expedite the appraisal of the project were signed. Following these agreements, KazMunayGas and PetroChina started a feasibility study of the pipeline project. At the same time China continued negotiations with other Central Asian countries.

On 3 April 2006, Chinese leader Hu Jintao and Turkmen President Saparmurat Niyazov signed a framework agreement on the pipeline construction and long-term gas supply. In June 2007, during his visit to China, Turkmen President Gurbanguly Berdimuhamedow signed an accord to speed up implementation of the Turkmen-Chinese gas pipeline project. On 30 April 2007, Uzbekistan and China signed an agreement on the construction and exploitation of the pipeline's Uzbekistan section. In July 2007, it was formally announced that Turkmenistan would join the original Kazakhstan-China pipeline project. On 8 November 2007, Kazakhstan's oil company KazMunayGas signed an agreement with the China National Petroleum Corporation on principles of future work on the pipeline.

On 30 August 2007, the construction of the 188 kilometres (117 mi) long Turkmen section of the pipeline began. This section was built by Stroytransgaz, a subsidiary of Gazprom. The main contractors were China Petroleum Pipeline Bureau, China Petroleum Engineering and Construction Corporation, and Zeromax. Construction of the Uzbek section started on 30 June 2008. It was built by Asia Trans Gas, a joint venture of Uzbekneftegas and CNPC. Construction works of the Kazakh section started on 9 July 2008 and the first stage was finished in July 2009. It was built by Asian Gas Pipeline company, a joint venture of CNPC and KazMunayGas. The main contractors of this section were KazStroyService and China Petroleum Engineering and Construction Corporation. The first of the two initial parallel line were completed early November 2009.

The Kazakh section of the pipeline was inaugurated on 12 December 2009 during Chinese leader Hu Jintao's visit to Kazakhstan. The whole pipeline was inaugurated on 14 December 2009 in a ceremony in Saman-Depe during Hu Jintao's visit to Turkmenistan with the leaders of Turkmenistan, Uzbekistan and Kazakhstan. On 13 June 2010 China and Kazakhstan signed an agreement on a branch line from Western Kazakhstan.

The second line was completed by the end of 2010. Construction of the third line began in 2012.

The construction of a 966 kilometres (600 mi) fourth line of the pipeline, "Line D", was to have been launched at the end of 2014. However, the fourth line has been dogged by delays. As of August 2021, one tunnel in Tajikistan had been completed. No date has been set for final completion. In May 2023, General Secretary of the Chinese Communist Party Xi Jinping urged Central Asia's leaders "to accelerate laying Line D", and an unnamed Chinese official reportedly said separately, "Central Asian pipelines are considered a cornerstone investment in China's energy and geopolitical space. It's a supply channel with strategic value that supersedes commercial concerns."

S&P Global reported in December 2023 that "PetroChina expects to resume the construction of Line D of the Central Asia – China Gas Pipeline (CAGP) in 2024..." and "...the contract was still under final negotiations. The main disagreement remaining was over prices and the delay in finalizing the upstream gas supply contract was the main reason for the suspension of Line D's construction..." In January 2026, state-owned Тurkmengaz stated that the Galkynysh gas field was to be developed in seven phases, of which the first stage had already been completed successfully. The fourth phase, to be started in early 2026, would include completion of Line D.

== Significance ==
According to CNPC, the inflow of Turkmen gas helps China in meeting its energy demands and stabilizes the country's overall consumption structure. It was expected that the pipeline's deliveries boost the natural gas proportion of energy consumption of China by an estimated 2%, which reduces the overall smoke, dust and carbon dioxide emissions. For Turkmenistan, the project helps the country diversify its energy exports by delivering gas eastward as opposed to its previous deliveries to Russia and Iran. Until the inauguration of the pipeline, nearly 70% of Turkmenistan's gas exports transited through Russian pipelines. Central Asia–China gas pipeline is the first pipeline to bring Central Asian natural gas to China and highlights China's quest for Central Asian energy exports. While Kazakhstan and Uzbekistan are also considering selling their gas to China, Chinese government already made new moves to penetrate deeper into Central Asian energy sector by lending $3 billion to Turkmenistan to develop the South Iolotan field in 2009 and $10 billion to Kazakhstan to pay for future oil supplies.

== Technical features ==
The length of Lines A, B, and C is about 1,833 kilometres (1,139 mi), of which 188 kilometres (117 mi) in Turkmenistan and 530 kilometres (330 mi) in Uzbekistan. The diameter of each pipeline is 1,067 millimetres (42.0 in). Lines A, B, and C constitute three parallel lines with combined total capacity of 55 billion cubic metres per annum (1.9×10^{12} cu ft/a) which was reached by 2015. Construction of the first line cost US$7.3 billion. The pipeline project also includes the desulfurization plant at Samand-Depe to remove high sulfur content of natural gas.

In 2023, the Turkmenistan Ministry of Foreign Affairs stated that Turkmenistan's quota on this pipeline system was 40 bcma.

A fourth pipeline (Line D), 966 kilometres (600 mi) in length to connect Galkynysh to western China via Kyrgyzstan and Tajikistan, is under construction. It was originally expected to be completed in 2020 but presently no completion date has been set. Upon its completion, total capacity of the four lines is expected to reach 85 billion cubic metres per annum (bcma).

== Route ==
The pipeline starts in Saman-Depe carrying natural gas from the Bagtyyarlyk gas fields on the right bank of Amu Darya in Turkmenistan. It is mainly supplied from Iolotan and Sag Kenar fields. The pipeline enters Uzbekistan in Olot and runs across Uzbekistan to southern Kazakhstan parallel to the existing Bukhara–Tashkent–Bishkek–Almaty pipeline. The pipeline crosses the Kazakhstan–China border at Khorgos, where it is connected to the second West–East Gas Pipeline.

In Shymkent, the pipeline will be linked with the 1,400-kilometre (870 mi) branch line from Beyneu in western Kazakhstan. It will supply natural gas from the Karachaganak, Tengiz and Kashagan gas fields. The branch line will have a capacity of 15 billion cubic meters of natural gas per year. It was commissioned in 2014.

== See also ==
- China-Turkmenistan relations
- Kazakhstan–China oil pipeline
- Central Asia – Center gas pipeline system
- Trans-Afghanistan Pipeline
- Energy policy of China
- Energy security of China
- Altai gas pipeline
- Power of Siberia
