= Wang Yilin =

Chinese businessman (born 1956)

- 王宜林
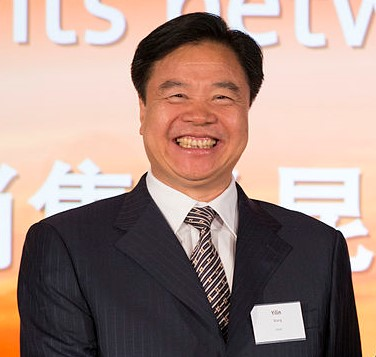

Chairman of China National Petroleum Corporation
- In office May 2015 – January 2020
- Preceded by: Zhou Jiping
- Succeeded by: Dai Houliang

Chairman of PetroChina
- In office May 2015 – January 2020
- Preceded by: Zhou Jiping
- Succeeded by: Dai Houliang

Chairman of CNOOC Limited
- In office April 2011 – April 2015
- Preceded by: Fu Chengyu
- Succeeded by: Yang Hua

Chairman of China National Offshore Oil Corporation
- In office April 2011 – April 2015
- Preceded by: Fu Chengyu
- Succeeded by: Yang Hua

Personal details
- Born: September 1956 (age 70) Ganyu County, Jiangsu, China
- Party: Chinese Communist Party (until 2024)
- Education: China University of Petroleum

Wang Yilin (Chinese: 王宜林; pinyin: Wáng Yílín; born September 1956) is a Chinese businessman who was the chairman of the Board of China National Petroleum Corporation (CNPC) and the chairman of the Board of PetroChina.

Wang, as the country's most influential business leader, has accompanied Chinese Communist Party general secretary Xi Jinping during many state visits, including to the UK, France, Kazakhstan, Russia, UAE etc.

== Biography ==
In April 2011, Wang assumed the role of Chairman of China National Offshore Oil Corporation.

In November 2012, he was elected member of the CCP's 18th Central Commission for Discipline Inspection.

=== Downfall ===
On 2 February 2024, Wang was put under investigation for alleged "serious violations of discipline and laws"by the Central Commission for Discipline Inspection (CCDI), the party's internal disciplinary body, and the National Supervisory Commission, the highest anti-corruption agency of China. In July 2024, Wang was expelled from the CCP for discipline violations.

On 13 May 2025 he was sentenced to 13 years in prison for bribery.

Business positions
Preceded by Fu Chengyu	Chairman of China National Offshore Oil Corporation; 2011–2015	Succeeded by Yang Hua
Preceded by Fu Chengyu	Chairman of CNOOC Limited; 2011–2015	Succeeded by Yang Hua
Preceded by Zhou Jiping	Chairman of PetroChina; 2015–2020	Succeeded by Dai Houliang
Preceded by Zhou Jiping	Chairman of China National Petroleum Corporation; 2015–2020	Succeeded by Dai Houliang
