= Wang Tianpu =

Chinese chemist

- 王天普

General Manager of China Petrochemical Corporation
- In office August 2011 – April 2015
- Preceded by: Su Shulin
- Succeeded by: Dai Houliang

Personal details
- Born: September 1962 (age 64) Changle County, Shandong, China
- Party: Chinese Communist Party (1984–2015; expelled)
- Education: Qingdao University of Science and Technology

Wang Tianpu (Chinese: 王天普; pinyin: Wáng Tiānpǔ; born 1962) is a Chinese chemical engineer and CEO. He was the former president of Sinopec, one of the three largest state-owned oil companies in China. On April 27, 2015, Wang was placed under investigation by the Central Commission for Discipline Inspection, the Chinese Communist Party's internal control body. He expelled from the CCP on September 18, 2015. Two years later, he was sentenced to 15 years and 6 months in prison for graft.

== Biography ==
Wang was born in 1962 in Changle County, Shandong Province. In July 1985, Wang obtained BEng in organic chemical engineering from Qingdao Institute of Chemical Industry. Wang obtained MBA from Dalian University of Technology in July 1996. In August 2003, Wang obtained doctor of chemical engineering from Zhejiang University in Hangzhou. Wang is a (national) senior engineer equivalent to professor (Chinese: 教授级高级工程师).

From August 2001 to April 2003, Wang was a vice-president of Sinopec. From April 2003 to March 2005, Wang was a senior/exclusive vice-president of Sinopec. Since March 2005, Wang has been the President of Sinopec. Since May 2006, Wang has been elected as a Director of the Board of Sinopec.

On April 27, 2015, Wang Tianpu was placed under investigation by the Central Commission for Discipline Inspection for "serious violations of laws and regulations". Wang was expelled from the CCP on September 18, 2015. On January 24, 2017, Wang was sentenced to 15 years and 6 months in prison.

Business positions
Preceded by Su Shulin	General Manager of China Petrochemical Corporation; 2011–2015	Succeeded by Dai Houliang
