= Lanjing =

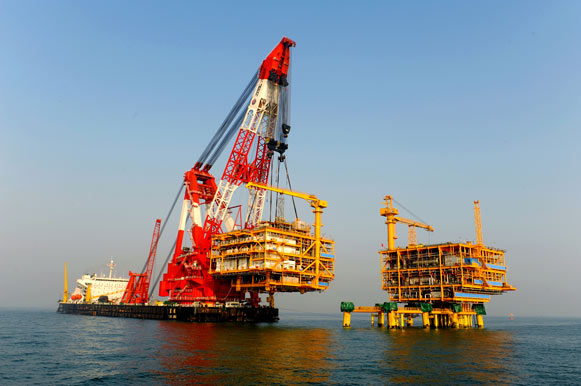
- Crane vessel Lanjing

History

Hong Kong
- Name: Lanjing (蓝鲸)
- Owner: CNOOC Limited, Hong Kong
- Operator: COOEC
- Port of registry: , Hong Kong, China
- Builder: ZPMC
- Launched: 1990 (as oil tanker)
- Acquired: 2008 (converted into crane vessel)
- Maiden voyage: 10 July 2008
- In service: 2008 (as crane vessel)
- Identification: IMO Number 8907527; MMSI 477110100
- Status: In service

General characteristics
- Class & type: Crane vessel
- Tonnage: 64,110 GT; 65,473 DWT
- Length: 217 m (711 ft 11 in) loa
- Beam: 50 m (164 ft 1 in) moulded
- Draught: 8.6 m (28 ft 3 in) (light); 13.4 m (44 ft 0 in) (summer)
- Depth: 20.4 m (66 ft 11 in)
- Propulsion: B&W 6S 60MC, MCR 13,800 PS x 79 rpm
- Speed: 11 knots (20 km/h; 13 mph)
- Crew: 300 persons (102 crew + 198 workers)
- Notes: Lifting capacity: Main crane = 7,500 tonnes x 45 m; Revolving lifting hook = 4,000 tonnes x 40 m; Auxiliary hook = 1,600 tonnes

Lanjing (蓝鲸) is a self-propelled, deep water crane vessel, owned by China National Offshore Oil Corporation (CNOOC), the national oil exploration company of China, through its Hong Kong-listed subsidiary CNOOC Limited. Built in 2012, it is one of the six large crane barges owned by COOEC and CNOOC, namely HYSY201, HYSY 202, Lanjing, Blue Xinjiang, Binhai 109, HYSY286, HYSY289 and HYSY291.

== History ==
Lanjing was built as MT Sanko Pioneer, a VLCC. In 1997, she was purchased by a new owner and her name was changed to MT Torres Spirit. In 2005, she was sold and renamed MT Zhen Hua 15 by her new owner. Subsequently, she was purchased by CNOOC and COOEC, and converted into a large crane vessel. Her conversion and outfitting took nearly two years and was completed in July 2008.

== Vessel particulars ==
Equipped with a large 7,500 tonnes lifting capacity crane, an additional 4,000 tonnes crane and an auxiliary 1,600 tonnes hook, a long stinger and extensive equipment for lifting and lowering exceptionally heavy equipment and oil rigs, Lanjing is the largest crane vessel in the world (as of 2019). It has been engaged in numerous projects across the world, including installing some of the largest oil rigs in the world, building some of the largest bridges off the coast of China, and laying sub sea oil pipelines as well as installing offshore structures in the South China Sea and off Myanmar (Zawtika). In recent years, it has been part of large-scale offshore projects in Myanmar (Zawtika project), off Hainan and off Brunei for the "Hengyi project".
