= Wang Yupu =

Chinese businessman (1956–2020)

- 王玉普
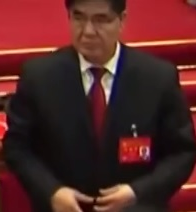
- Wang in 2017

Minister of Emergency Management
- In office 19 March 2018 – 8 December 2020
- Premier: Li Keqiang
- Preceded by: New title
- Succeeded by: Huang Ming

Director of the State Administration of Work Safety
- In office 19 September 2017 – 19 March 2018
- Premier: Li Keqiang
- Preceded by: Yang Huanning
- Succeeded by: Position revoked

Chairman of China Petrochemical Corporation
- In office 4 May 2015 – 19 September 2017
- Preceded by: Fu Chengyu
- Succeeded by: Dai Houliang

Personal details
- Born: 6 October 1956 Xinmin County, Liaoning, China
- Died: 8 December 2020 (aged 64) Tianjin, China
- Party: Chinese Communist Party
- Education: Northeast Petroleum University

Wang Yupu (Chinese: 王玉普; pinyin: Wáng Yùpǔ; October 1956 – 8 December 2020) was a Chinese politician and businessman, and a chairman of Sinopec, the world's second-biggest oil refiner.

== Biography ==
Wang was born in Xinmin, Liaoning, and began his career in the Daqing Oil Field. In September 2017, Wang was appointed as the Director of the State Administration of Work Safety. He was appointed as the first Minister of Emergency Management in March 2018.

Wang died of COVID-19 at age 64 on 8 December 2020.

Business positions
Preceded by Su Shulin	Chairman of Daqing Oilfield Co., Ltd. 2003–2009	Succeeded by Wang Yongchun
Preceded by Fu Chengyu	Chairman of China Petrochemical Corporation; 2015–2017	Succeeded by Dai Houliang
Government offices
Preceded by Gai Ruyin	Vice Governor of Heilongjiang; 2009–2010	Succeeded by Xu Guangguo
Preceded by Yang Huanning	Director of the State Administration of Work Safety; 2017–2018	Succeeded by Position revoked
New title	Minister of Emergency Management; 2018–2020	Vacant Wang Yupu died of cancer on 8 December 2020. Title next held by Huang Ming
Civic offices
Preceded by Chen Hao	First Secretary of the Secretariat of All-China Federation of Trade Unions; 2010–2013	Succeeded by Sun Chunlan
Academic offices
Preceded by Pan Yunhe	Vice President of the Chinese Academy of Engineering; 2013–2015	Succeeded by Li Xiaohong
