= Reji Abraham =

Indian businesspeople

- Born: Chennai, Tamil Nadu, India
- Citizenship: Indian
- Education: BE and MBA
- Occupation: Managing director at Aban Group

Reji Abraham is the managing director of Aban Group in India. He was listed on the 2008 and 2009 Forbes list of the world's wealthiest people. He runs India's largest offshore drilling company Aban Offshore. He resides in Chennai. According to Forbes 2008, Abraham was named the 605th richest man in the world with an estimated $2 billion fortune. As of 2009, his wealth has decreased to $770 million. His wealth is mainly dependent on the fortunes of his company, Aban Offshore. In 2014, Aban Offshore's market cap drastically dipped due to the prolonged bear market.

He possesses both a Bachelor of Engineering (BE) degree and a Master of Business Administration (MBA) degree.

== History ==
Reji Abrahams business empire initially began with his late father M.A Abraham in 1986 as a small construction firm. Reji Abraham took charge of Aban Group in 2004 after his father's death. Under his leadership Aban Group acquired two tranches from a Norwegian company, Sinvest, for a sum of $1.3 billion.

== Awards ==
- 2008: Listed on the 2008 Forbes list of the world's wealthiest people.
