= Philip Morris (archivist) =

British media recovery specialist (born 1968)

- Born: Philip Gary Morris; February 1968 (age 58)
- Occupation: Media recovery specialist
- Organization: Television International Enterprises Archive

Philip Gary Morris (born February 1968) is an English former oil rig worker and media recovery specialist. He is best known for being held hostage in 2006 by Nigerian kidnappers, and for founding Television International Enterprises Archive (TIEA).

== Hostage ==
Prior to being taken hostage, Philip Morris worked on rigs for twenty years all over the world including Africa and the Americas. While working on the rig Bulford Dolphin in 2006 as a crane operator, Morris was taken hostage along with eight others (six British, one American, one Canadian). He was held hostage for four days in the jungle village of Bilabre, Nigeria. The Nigerian government negotiated the hostages release and paid a $200,000 ransom. Instead of returning to his job seven weeks after being released, he sought counseling for posttraumatic stress disorder. Morris was later charged by police with "assault and criminal damage" after an incident with his former girlfriend at her home. The charges were dropped six months later. He would not return to Nigeria and received a settlement from his employer due to being taken hostage.

== Television International Enterprises Archive (TIEA) ==
Morris founded the Television International Enterprises Archives, a company that searches for lost television episodes. His biggest recovery has been nine missing Doctor Who episodes found in Nigeria, from the serials The Enemy of the World and The Web of Fear, featuring the Second Doctor, Patrick Troughton. TIEA and Morris were working on Project Genesis, cataloguing materials with the Nigerian Television Authority, when the episodes were discovered in a Jos television relay station. The episodes were in good condition considering the environmental conditions and civil unrest, and lost for decades prior to their recovery. Morris's work requires bodyguards, due to the danger involved; he tries to work anonymously, but was in a troubled region during the announcement of the recovered Doctor Who episodes, causing security issues. He has also successfully recovered content from The Basil Brush Show and The Sky at Night. In 2018, Morris recovered two lost episodes of The Morecambe & Wise Show from an abandoned theater in Freetown, Sierra Leone.

== See also ==
- List of kidnappings
- List of solved missing person cases (post-2000)
