= China Oilfield Services =

Chinese petroleum services company

China Oilfield Services Limited 中海油田服务股份有限公司
- Company type: State-owned enterprise
- Traded as: (SEHK: 2883,SSE: 601808)
- Industry: Oil exploration and Oil drilling
- Founded: 2001
- Headquarters: Beijing, China
- Area served: China
- Key people: Fu Chengyu (Chairman)
- Parent: CNOOC
- Website: China Oilfield Services Limited

China Oilfield Services
- Simplified Chinese: 中海油田服务股份有限公司
- Traditional Chinese: 中海油田服務股份有限公司
Transcriptions
Standard Mandarin
- Hanyu Pinyin: Zhōnghǎi Yóutián Fúwù Gǔfèn Yǒuxiàn Gōngsī

China Oilfield Services (COSL) is an oilfield services company. It is a majority owned subsidiary of Chinese state owned company CNOOC Group. It also has a listed sister company in Hong Kong, CNOOC Limited.

China Oilfield Services usually purchases off shore vessels (OSVs) and operates them in Southeast Asia, the Middle East and Central Asia in off shore projects of CNOOC. It also operates in Indonesia, Malaysia and the Caspian Sea.

== Overseas ==
COSL's overseas revenue surged 133% year on year in the first half of 2015 to 209.8 million yuan, driven by demand for its services in Indonesia, West Africa and the Middle East.

COSL had an office in Kuala Lumpur, Malaysia briefly in the early 2000s when it had its first western Vice President, Alan Good, a British born Oilman who helped launch the company internationally and pushed for further growth in the international sector.

COSL also maintains an office in Houston, TX as COSL America.

== Stock ==
Globally, the number of listed players in the oilfield services sector is just over 100, with a combined market capitalisation of about US$250 billion. The top five account for 40% of the industry's market capitalisation. The two largest companies in this sector are Schlumberger with a 2007 year-end market cap of US$117.6 billion and Halliburton with a 2007-year end market cap of US$33.4 billion.

According to Mr. Chen, US firms tend to be the most expensive with enterprise values running two to three times book values, compared with one or less in Europe and Asia.

COSL claims a 95% share of China's market for offshore drilling services, 70% of the marine support and transportation market, 60% of the well survey services market and more than 50% of the seismic data collection market.

Globally, about 15% of oil companies' capital expenditure goes to exploration, 35% to field development and 50% to production.

COSL posted a 22.7% year-on-year rise in interim net profit to 555.9 million Yuan, ($115 million).

== Acquisitions ==
On 23 September 2008, COSL acquired Norway's Awilco Offshore ASA (AWO) for 17.1 billion yuan (2.51 billion U.S. dollars), which is to be merged into COSL Drilling Europe AS, a wholly owned subsidiary of COSL. The deal received backing from the relevant government departments of Norway and Statoil, the state oil company of Norway. The deal increased the number of COSL's operating rigs to 22 from 15 and created the world's eighth largest rig fleet.
