= Petrojack =

Norwegian oil rig operator

Petrojack ASA
- Company type: Public (OSE: JACK)
- Industry: Oilfield services
- Founded: 2004
- Headquarters: Oslo, Norway
- Key people: Lars Moldestad (CEO); Berge Gerdt Larsen (Chairman)
- Services: Drilling
- Revenue: ▲NOK 810 million (2006)
- Operating income: NOK 772 million (2006)
- Net income: NOK 566 million (2006)
- Website: petrojack.no

Petrojack was a Norwegian offshore drilling rig operator. The company had two jackup rigs under order from Jurong Shipyard in Singapore, while it sold its two former rigs Petrojack I and Petrojack III to Maersk Drilling. The company was founded in 2004 and was listed on the Oslo Stock Exchange the next year. The largest shareholders were Petrolia Drilling (40%), Awilco Offshore (18%) and Sinvest (18%).

== Stock Value ==
In week 47 2009, Petrojack's stock value went up from 0,90 NOK per share to a maximum of 7,12 NOK per share. On the first day of this extreme rise, at 09:49, the stock was suspended because the share price rose 64% without any statement from the company itself. The stock was reopened 11 minutes later at 10:00.

== Bankruptcy ==
Petrojack reportedly went bankrupt toward the end of 2010.
