= Ocean Heavylift =

Norwegian shipping company

Ocean Heavylift ASA
- Company type: Public
- Industry: Shipping
- Founded: 2005
- Headquarters: Oslo, Norway
- Area served: Global
- Products: Heavy lift vessels
- Website: www.oceanheavylift.no

Ocean Heavylift is a Norwegian shipping company that operates four heavy lift vessels that operate on the segment of dry transport of offshore installations. The company was established in 2005 and ordered four vessels from Gdansk Shiprepair Yard Remontowa and Huarun Dadong Dockyard with delivery in 2006 and 2007. It was listed on the Oslo Stock Exchange in 2007. The largest owner is Awilco (34%).
