= Qust =

Qust or QUST may refer to:

- Qingdao University of Science and Technology, a university located in Qingdao, China, colloquially known as Qingkeda
- Saussurea costus, also known as "kuth" or "costus", a species of thistle whose roots are a source of essential oils
