= Dai Houliang =

Chinese businessman

- 戴厚良

Chairman of China National Petroleum Corporation
- Incumbent
- Assumed office 17 January 2020
- Preceded by: Wang Yilin

Chairman of China Petrochemical Corporation
- In office May 2018 – January 2020
- Preceded by: Wang Yupu
- Succeeded by: Zhang Yuzhuo

Personal details
- Born: 20 August 1963 (age 63) Jiangdu County, Jiangsu, China
- Party: Chinese Communist Party
- Education: Changzhou University

Dai Houliang (Chinese: 戴厚良; pinyin: Dài Hòuliáng; born 20 August 1963) is a Chinese chemical engineer and business executive currently serving as chairman of China National Petroleum Corporation. He was an alternate of the 19th Central Committee of the Chinese Communist Party.

== Biography ==
Dai was born in Jiangdu County, Jiangsu, on 20 August 1963. He secondary studied at Dinggou High School (丁沟中学). In July 1981, he was accepted to Changzhou University, where he majored in organic chemical industry. Beginning in 1985, he served in several posts in Yangzi Petrochemical, including deputy general manager, general manager, and chairman. He was appointed deputy financial director of Sinopec, one of the three largest state-owned oil companies in China, in September 2005, becoming vice president in November 2005 and senior vice president and financial director in May 2006. In June 2008, he joined the China Petrochemical Corporation, where he was promoted to general manager in May 2016 and to chairman in May 2018. On 17 January 2020, he was appointed chairman of China National Petroleum Corporation, replacing Wang Yilin.

== Honors and awards ==
- 2016 State Science and Technology Progress Award (Special Prize) for the development and application of high efficiency and environmental protection aromatics complete set technology

Business positions
Preceded by Wang Tianpu	General Manager of China Petrochemical Corporation; 2016–2019	Succeeded by Ma Yongsheng
Preceded by Wang Yupu	Chairman of China Petrochemical Corporation; 2018–2020	Succeeded by Zhang Yuzhuo
Preceded by Wang Yilin	Chairman of China National Petroleum Corporation; 2020–present	Incumbent
