= Xu Gang =

Xu Gang may refer to:

- Xu Gang (politician) (徐钢; born 1958)
- Xu Gang (pole vaulter) (born 1979), Chinese pole vaulter and medalist at the Athletics at the 2001 East Asian Games
- Xu Gang (cyclist) (徐刚; born 1984)
