= HYSY 202 =

History

China
- Name: HYSY 202 (Hai Yang Shi You 202)
- Owner: Offshore Oil Engineering, Tianjin, China
- Operator: COOEC
- Port of registry: , Tianjin, China PRC
- Route: World wide
- Builder: Jiangsu Rongsheng Heavy Industries, Rugao, China
- Yard number: 401
- Launched: 2012
- Completed: 2012
- Maiden voyage: May 2012, 10; 14 years ago
- Identification: IMO Number 9555371; MMSI 413738000
- Status: In service

General characteristics
- Class & type: Pipe laying vessel
- Tonnage: GRT
- Length: 168.3 m
- Beam: 46 m
- Height: (keel to top of funnels)
- Depth: 13.5 m

HYSY 202 (Hai Yang Shi You 202) is a non self propelled, shallow water pipe laying barge, owned by CNOOC, the national oil exploration company of China. Built in 2012, it is one of the six large crane barges owned by COOEC and CNOOC, namely "HYSY201", "HYSY 202", "Lanjing", "Blue Xinjiang", "Binhai 109", "HYSY286", "HYSY289" and "HYSY291".

Equipped with a large 1200 tonnes lifting capacity crane, a long stinger and extensive equipment for laying sub sea oil and gas pipelines, HYSY 202 has been engaged in numerous projects across the world, including building some of the largest bridges off the coast of China, and laying sub sea oil pipelines in the South China Sea. It is currently engaged in the Dangote project off the coast of Nigeria, for a two-year project (2019-2021) involving the installation of a long and large sub sea oil and gas pipeline catering to Dangote refineries and the oil needs of Nigeria.
