= Huang Xiaojing =

Chinese politician (born 1946)

- 黄小晶
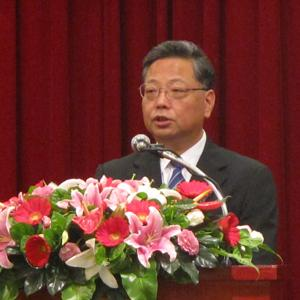
- Huang Xiaojing, 5 May 2010

Governor of Fujian
- In office December 2004 – April 2011
- Preceded by: Lu Zhangong
- Succeeded by: Su Shulin

Personal details
- Born: February 1946 (age 80) Fuzhou, Fujian
- Party: Chinese Communist Party

Huang Xiaojing (Chinese: 黄小晶; pinyin: Huáng Xiǎojīng; Pe̍h-ōe-jī: N̂g Sió-cheⁿ; February 1946 - ) is a politician of the People's Republic of China and a former governor of Fujian.

A native of Fuzhou, Fujian, Huang started working in September 1969, and joined the Chinese Communist Party in December 1973. He has served as the director of United Front Work Department of Communist Youth League Fuzhou municipal committee, the secretary of CYL Fuzhou committee, and vice secretary of CPC committee and governor of Gulou District of Fuzhou. In April 1993, he became the secretary of CPC committee in Longyan Region and the administrative officer. In April 1995, he was elevated to vice governor of Fujian Province. He became a standing committee member of CPC Fujian committee and vice governor of Fujian in December 2001. He was elected as vice secretary of CPC Fujian committee and vice governor in December 2003. In December 2004, Huang was appointed as the acting governor of Fujian by the standing committee of 10th Fujian People's Congress, and in January 2005, he was confirmed as governor of Fujian Province.

He was a member of 17th Central Committee of Chinese Communist Party.
