= Aban Pearl =

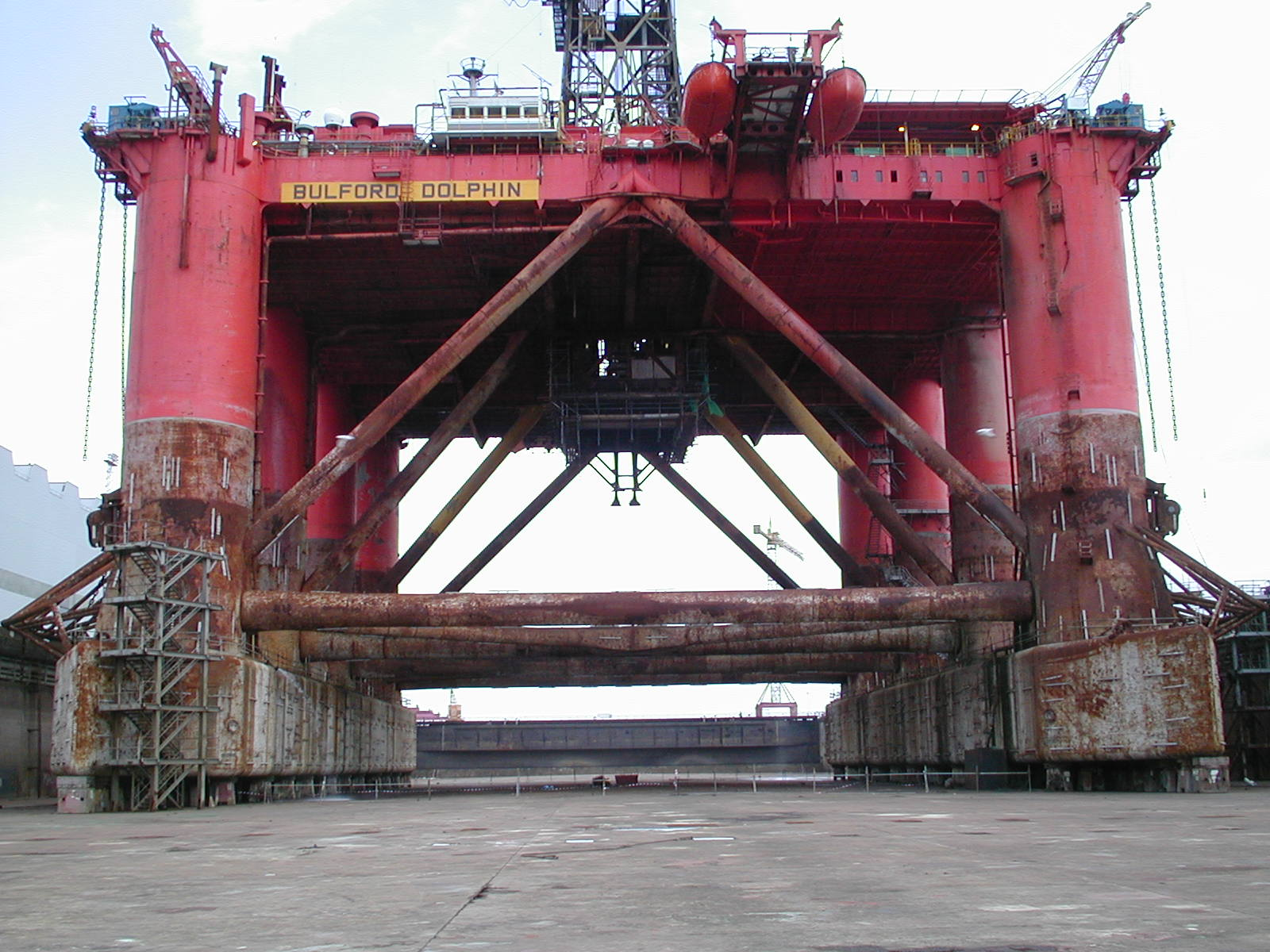
- in 2001, as Bulford Dolphin

History
- Name: Aban Pearl
- Owner: Aban Pearl Pte. Ltd.
- Operator: Aban Offshore
- Port of registry: Singapore
- Route: Venezuela
- Builder: Far East Levingston Shipbuilding
- Yard number: 115950
- Completed: 1977
- Identification: IMO number: 8756344; DNV ID:10547
- Fate: Sunk May 2010

General characteristics
- Class & type: Column-stabilised Drilling Unit
- Tonnage: 12,155 tonnes
- Displacement: 3,647 tonnes
- Length: 108.2 m (355 ft)
- Beam: 67.36 m (221.0 ft)
- Draught: 36.6 m (120 ft)
- Crew: 98

The Aban Pearl was a twin-hull, column-stabilized, semi-submersible offshore drilling rig owned and operated by Aban Offshore drilling company. It is registered in Singapore. In 2009, the Aban Pearl became the first offshore gas rig operated by the Venezuela's state-owned oil company PDVSA. In May 2010, the rig sank into the sea though all workers aboard at the time were saved.

== Background ==
The Aban Pearl was designed by Aker H-3 and was built in 1977 by Far East Levingston Shipbuilding (now part of the Keppel Corporation) at the Levingston Singapore shipyard. The Aban Pearl could operate at a rated water depth of 1,250 feet (380 m) and she had a drilling depth of 25,000 feet (7,600 m).

== History ==
In 1977–1996, she was named Transocean Seeker, in 1996 Treasure Seeker and in 1996–2000 Transocean Discoverer. All this time she was owned by Transocean. In 2000–2007, she was named Bulford Dolphin and operated under the Bahamas flag. The Bulford Dolphin was purchased for US$43.27 million by Bonheur ASA and Ganger Rolf ASA. The rig was operated by Dolphin Drilling, a subsidiary of Fred. Olsen Energy.

== Incidents ==
In 2006, while contracted by the Nigerian oil company Peak Petroleum, the rig was attacked near Nigeria by Nigerian militants and eight of the personnel on the rig were kidnapped. They were released unharmed after two days in captivity. In 2007, the rig was purchased by the Indian drilling company Aban for US$211 million.

In 2009, the rig was contracted under a five-year contract for PDVSA for drilling natural gas wells on the Mariscal Sucre complex off the coast of northeastern Venezuela in the Caribbean Sea. In August 2009 en route from Trinidad and Tobago to Venezuela its flotation devices took on water in heavy seas about 2 nautical miles (3.7 km; 2.3 mi) south-west of Point Baline, Gaspar Grande, Trinidad and Tobago and there was a call to evacuate the platform.

On 13 May 2010 at 2:20 a.m. (0650 GMT), when drilling at the Dragon 6 gas field, scheduled to come on stream by 2012, the rig sank in the deep about 525 feet (160 m) after water entered a subsea pontoon. All 95 crew members were evacuated from the rig to the nearby drilling ship Neptune Discoverer. According to the Venezuelan Energy Minister Rafael Ramirez, the well being explored by the Aban Pearl had been safely sealed. The rig was one of the company's biggest money earners bringing in about $358,000, or about 10.5 million rupees a day. The insurance claim of $235 million was settled in July 2010.

== See also ==
- Deepwater Horizon oil spill
