= CNOOC Building =

China National Offshore Oil Corporation Building
- 中海油总部大楼
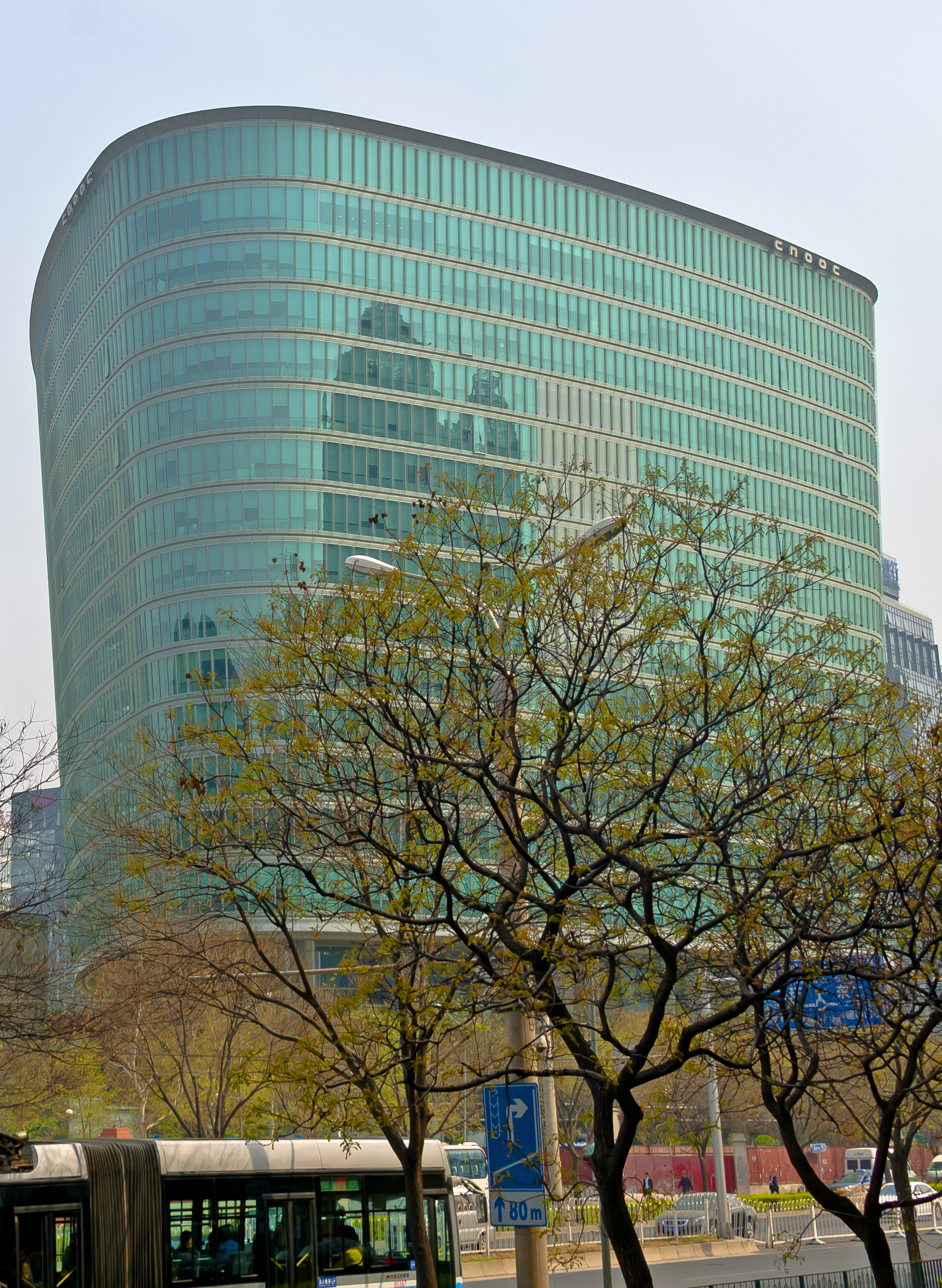
- View from southwest, 2014
- Interactive map of the China National Offshore Oil Corporation Building area

General information
- Type: Corporate headquarters
- Location: Beijing, China
- Coordinates: 39.92369°N 116.42637°E
- Named for: China National Offshore Oil Corporation
- Opened: 2006

Technical details
- Structural system: Concrete
- Material: Terra cotta, glass
- Floor area: 90,000 square metres (970,000 sq ft)

Design and construction
- Architect: William Louie
- Architecture firm: Kohn Pedersen Fox
- Structural engineer: China Architecture Design & Research Group
- Main contractor: China State Construction Engineering
- Awards: Hong Kong Institute of Architects Architecture Merit Award and Sustainability in Design Award (2007), Beijing Urban Planning Commission Design Excellence Award (2003)

The CNOOC Headquarters Building (simplified Chinese: 中海油总部大楼; traditional Chinese: 中海油總部大樓; pinyin: Zhōnghǎiyóu zǒngbù dàlóu) is located on the Second Ring Road in the Chaoyangmen neighborhood of Beijing's Dongcheng District. It is the corporate headquarters for the China National Offshore Oil Corporation, one of the country's two state-owned oil companies. It was designed by the New York architectural firm of Kohn Pedersen Fox (KPF) and opened in 2006.

== Design ==
According to KPF, aspects of the building's design are meant to evoke the petroleum industry. It is in the shape of a triangle with rounded corners, gently flaring outward, as to suggest the prow of an oil tanker. At its base level, the building is supported by piloti, suggesting the offshore oil derricks that are the company's primary source of product. The grounds are also landscaped to suggest the surface of the ocean.

The building is meant to be a counterpart to the large Ministry of Foreign Affairs building on the opposite corner of the intersection of the Second Ring Road and Chaoyangmen Street. Inside it has a central atrium lit by an upper clerestory. Sky gardens around the atrium are meant to facilitate impromptu, informal meetings between employees. Outside, a western courtyard, buffered from the busy street by a three-story L-shaped podium and entered through an oversize gateway, is meant to invite visitors to explore the building.

Local reaction to the building has seen it differently. Many residents thought that, instead of resembling a ship or an oil derrick, the building looked like a toilet bowl, particularly a model without a tank then being marketed in China by Kohler. A local advertiser later erected a billboard promoting that toilet atop a building across the Ring Road.
