= Duan Huiling =

Chinese mechanical engineer

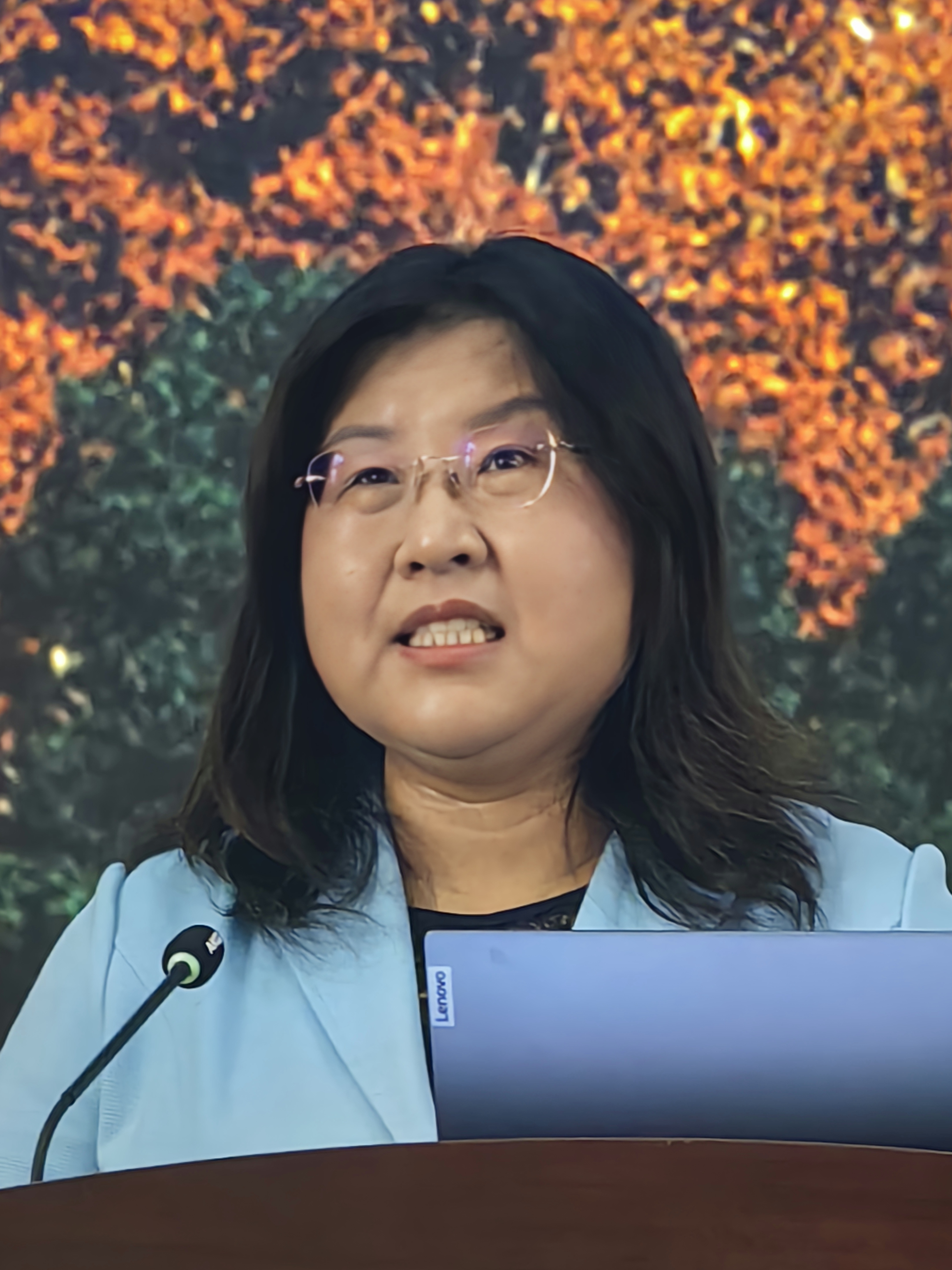
Duan Huiling at Wuhan University

Duan Huiling (Chinese: 段慧玲) is a Chinese mechanical engineer, specializing in interface mechanics, the interactions between fluids and solids, and the surface properties and elasticity of nanoscale structures. She is dean of engineering at Peking University.

== Education and career ==
Duan studied mechanical engineering at Northeast Petroleum University, graduating with a bachelor's degree in 1995 and earning a master's degree in 1998. From 1998 to 2001 was a lecturer at the university. After returning to graduate study at Peking University, she completed a Ph.D. in solid mechanics in 2005.

She was a postdoctoral researcher at Cardiff University in the United Kingdom, supported by a Royal Society Postdoctoral Fellowship, and at the Institute of Nanotechnology of the Karlsruhe Research Center (FZK-INT, now part of the Karlsruhe Institute of Technology) in Germany, supported by an Alexander von Humboldt Fellowship. In 2007 she returned to China as an associate professor at Peking University, subsequently becoming full professor and, in 2014, Chang Jiang Chair Professor.

At Peking University, she chaired the Department of Mechanics and Engineering Science from 2013 to 2018, and was named dean of the College of Engineering in 2020. In 2025 she holds the title of Founding Director of the Faculty of Engineering at Peking University.

== Research ==
Her research yielded over 200 peer reviewed publications and over 7500 citations. Her early publications included a piece on elastostatic problems in 2005, more recently she worked on Artificial Intelligence-Aided Design in 2025.

== Recognition ==
Duan was the 2009 recipient of the Sia Nemat-Nasser Early Career Award of the American Society of Mechanical Engineers, which elected her as a Fellow in 2020, and as a Fellow of The World Academy of Sciences in 2026.

She is also a recipient of the Distinguished Young Scholars Award of the National Natural Science Foundation of China (2012), and was named a National Outstanding Young Female Scientist of China (2014) and National Outstanding Young Scholar of China (2015).
