= Northeast Petroleum University =

Public university in Heilongjiang, China

Coordinates: 46.5860°N 125.1459°E

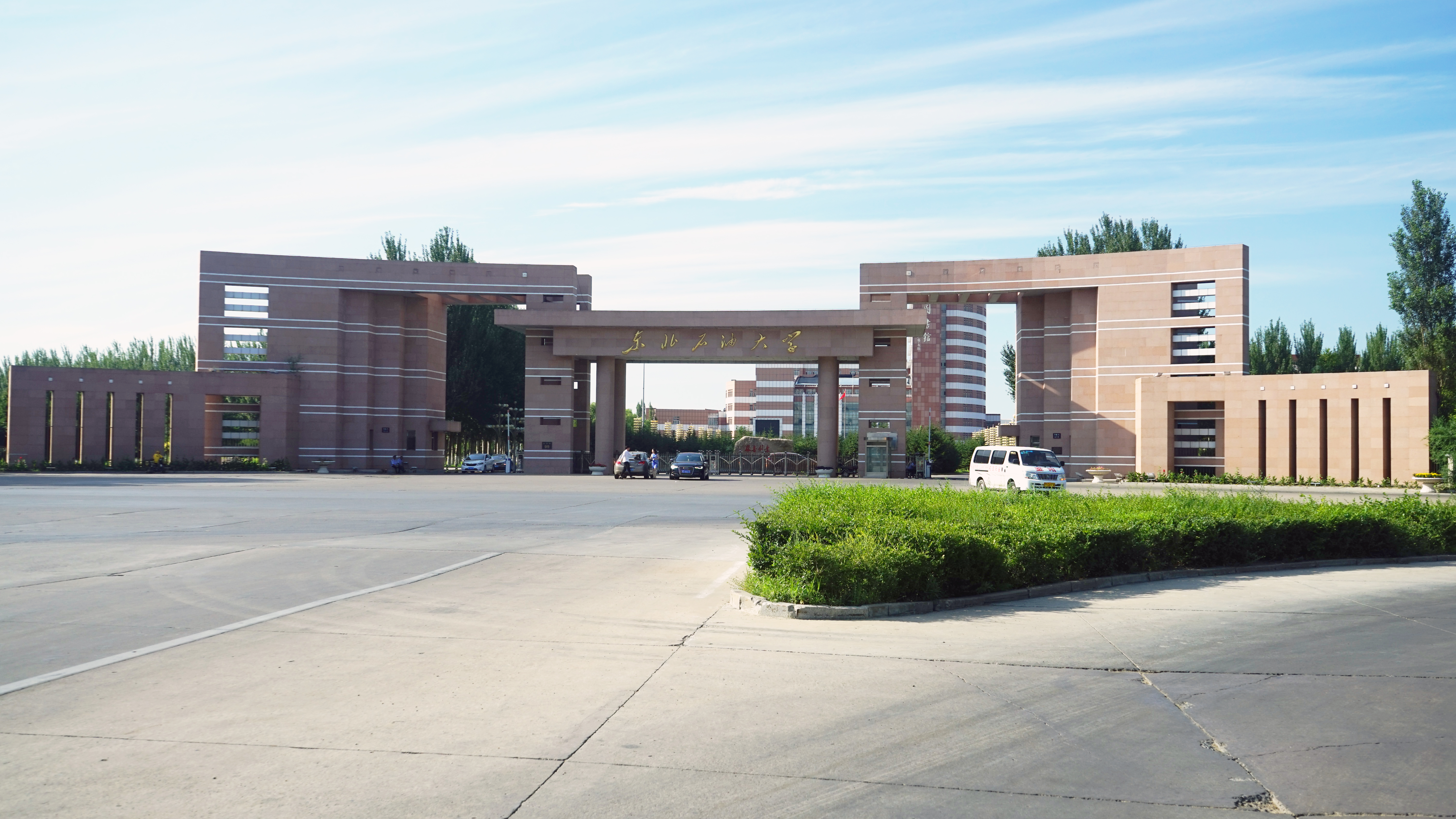
Gate of Northeast Petroleum University

Northeast Petroleum University (simplified Chinese: 东北石油大学; traditional Chinese: 東北石油大學; pinyin: Dōngběi Shíyóu Dàxué) is a national key institution of higher learning in Daqing, Heilongjiang province, People's Republic of China.

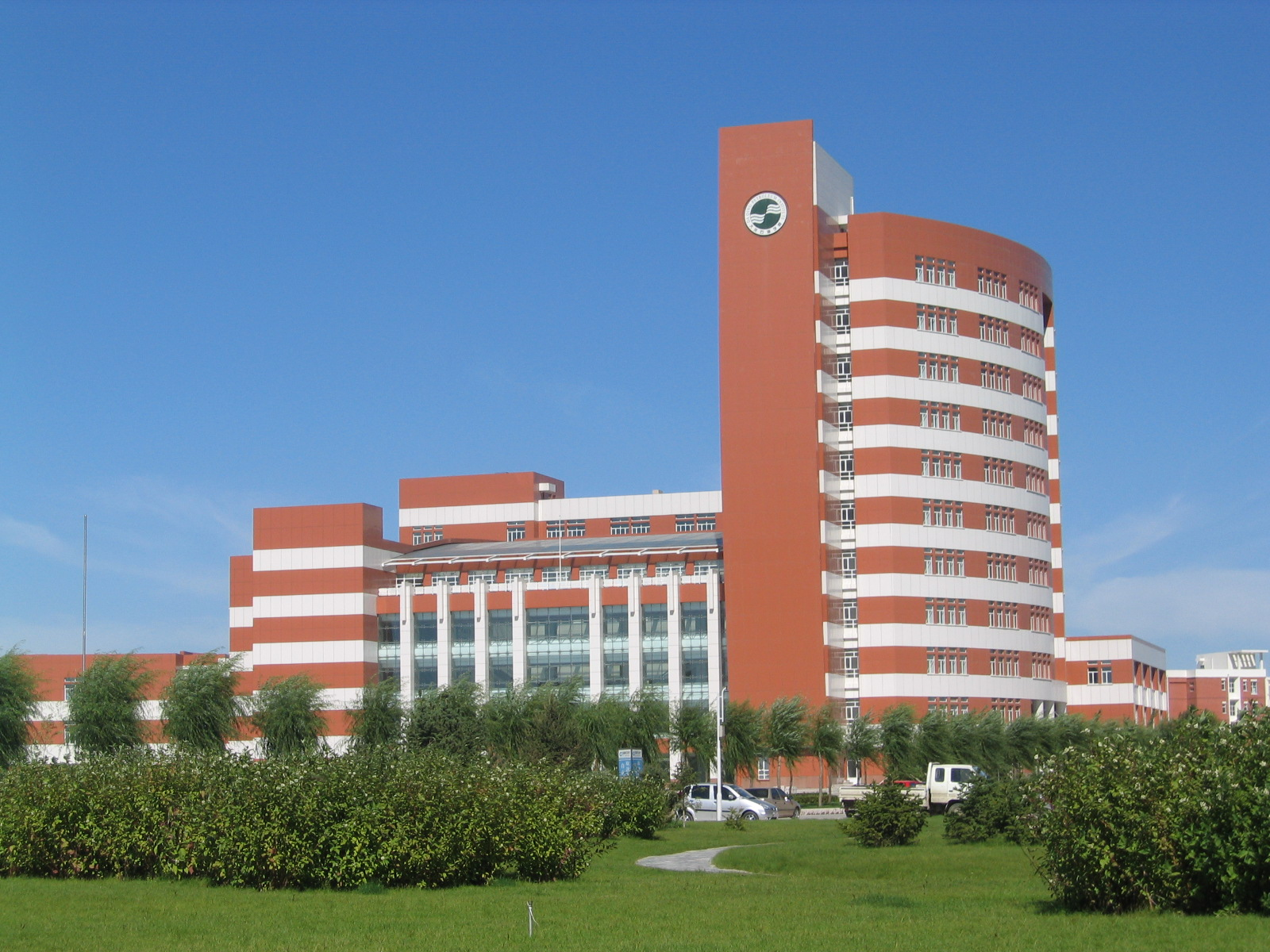
Main library of NEPU

== History ==
The institute was founded in 1960, formerly called Northeast Petroleum Institute (Chinese: 东北石油学院; pinyin: Dōngběi Shíyóu Xuéyuàn). In 1975, it was renamed Daqing Petroleum Institute (Chinese: 大庆石油学院; pinyin: Dàqìng Shíyóu Xuéyuàn). In October 1978, the institute was accredited by the State Council of the People's Republic of China, being one of 88 national key universities.

Since February 2000, the institute has been under the jurisdiction of central and provincial governments, and has been mainly administered by Heilongjiang Province. In June 2000, the provincial government approved the relocation scheme from Anda to Daqing, which was completed in October 2002. The college was renamed Northeast Petroleum University in 2010.

== Academics ==
The school has 18 secondary education colleges (departments), higher vocational and technical colleges and continue education colleges, and 61 undergraduate majors; 4 post-doctoral training stations, 1 post-doctoral research station, and 3 doctoral degrees first-level authorizations disciplines, 18 master's degrees first-level authorized disciplines, 19 doctoral degree programs, 89 master's degree programs; The university has the right to grant master's degree in 3 categories of business administration (MBA), social work, and engineering, of which the engineering category has 15 authorized sites for master's degree; 1 national-level key discipline, 3 national-level key disciplines, 8 national-level specialty construction sites, 19 provincial-level key (featured) majors, 1 provincial-level key Discipline group, 6 provincial first-level key disciplines, 26 provincial second-level key disciplines, the school currently has 2519 teaching staff. There are 330 professors, 650 associate professors, 404 doctoral degree lecturers, 841 master's degree lecturers There are 95 doctoral supervisors. The school has 1 academician of the Chinese Academy of Sciences and 3 academicians of the Chinese Academy of Engineering; 1 member of the Academic Evaluation Committee of the Academic Degrees Committee of the State Council; 6 members of the Steering Committee of the Higher Education Department of the Ministry of Education; 26 experts enjoying special allowances from the State Council; "3 winners, 1 winner from the first batch of "Young Talent Support Program" of the Central Organization Department, "1 winner from the National Excellent Youth Fund", 1 winner from the Heliang Heli Science and Technology Progress Award, "Longjiang Scholar" "17 people, 2 provincial-level outstanding experts, 25 academic leaders and reserve leaders in Heilongjiang Province; the school has national model teachers, national excellent teachers, Heilongjiang Province teaching teachers, Heilongjiang Province model teachers, and 18 outstanding teachers in Heilongjiang Province.

== Campus ==
The school occupies an area of 1.503 million square meters, with an area of 600,000 square meters for teaching administration. The indoor and outdoor stadium area is 157,000 square meters. The 10 Gigabit campus network is connected to all the main buildings in the teaching area, office area, and teachers' and students' living areas. The total value of teaching and research instruments exceeds 200 million yuan. There is a modern library with a single building area of 45,000 square meters, with a collection of 2.22 million books and 19 types of data resources. The school has a national university science park, and 16 key laboratories above the provincial and ministerial level have been built, including a national key laboratory cultivation base, a national engineering research laboratory, a key laboratory of the Ministry of Education, and a ministerial level. There are 9 key laboratories, 4 provincial key laboratories, 1 provincial philosophy and social science research base, 6 provincial and ministerial engineering technology research centers, 6 provincial key laboratories, and 2 provincial humanities and social science bases. There are 42 undergraduate teaching experiment centers (rooms); 6 provincial-level double-base qualified laboratories, 1 national experimental teaching demonstration center, 1 national virtual simulation experimental teaching center, 6 provincial experimental teaching demonstration centers There are 122 internship bases inside and outside the school, including 2 national-level undergraduate experimental education bases and 3 provincial-level undergraduate experimental education bases.

The school library has a collection of 2.1 million books, more than 3300 Chinese and foreign language periodicals, and is connected to the National Digital Library. The library with a construction area of 45,000 square meters has invested 180 million yuan, and the modern facilities in the library are complete.

In terms of scientific research, a relatively stable research direction has been formed in the fields of tertiary oil recovery and new energy research. In the past three years, a total of 1,728 scientific research projects have been undertaken, including 113 national-level projects such as the National Natural Science Foundation of China, 973, and 863 Programs, with a research funding of 688 million yuan. 164 scientific research achievements received scientific and technological awards at all levels, and a total of 58 national scientific and technological progress awards and provincial and ministerial awards. A total of 4162 academic papers were published in domestic and foreign academic journals, and 758 papers were included in the three major retrieval systems of SCI, EI, and ISTP.

In terms of international cooperation, the school has established inter-school relations with many well-known universities in more than 20 countries including Canada, the United States, Japan, Australia, Russia, the United Kingdom, and South Korea, and signed academic exchange agreements. More than 70 foreign experts and teachers are hired to teach at the school. The school signed a joint school agreement with the Missouri University of Science and Technology and the Kuban State Technical College of Russia. In 2002, the school also recruited the first batch of international students.

== Notable alumni ==
- Duan Huiling, dean of engineering at Peking University
- Han Dongyan, politician
- Liu He, deputy chief engineer of the Research Institute of Petroleum Exploration and Development
- Su Shulin, oil and gas executive and former politician
- Wang Yupu, politician and businessman
- Zhang Jing, engineer and politician
