= Han Dongyan =

Chinese politician (born 1963)

- 韩冬炎

Director of the State-owned Assets Supervision and Administration Commission of Heilongjiang Government
- In office 2 March 2016 – 23 March 2018
- Preceded by: Zhao Jie (赵杰)
- Succeeded by: Wang Zhikui

Chairman of the Standing Committee of Qiqihar People's Congress
- In office July 2012 – February 2016
- Preceded by: Hao Huilong
- Succeeded by: Sun Shen

Communist Party Secretary of Qiqihar
- In office June 2012 – February 2016
- Preceded by: Hao Huilong (郝会龙)
- Succeeded by: Sun Shen (孙珅)

Mayor of Qiqihar
- In office May 2010 – June 2012
- Preceded by: Liu Gang (刘刚)
- Succeeded by: Guo Xinshuang (郭新双)

Personal details
- Born: April 1963 (age 63) Qing'an County, Heilongjiang, China
- Party: Chinese Communist Party (expelled; 1984-2018)
- Education: Northeast Petroleum University; Harbin Engineering University

Han Dongyan (simplified Chinese: 韩冬炎; traditional Chinese: 韓冬炎; pinyin: Hán Dōngyán; born April 1963) is a former Chinese politician who spent most of his career in both cities of Daqing and Qiqihar in northeast China's Heilongjiang province. He was investigated by the Heilongjiang Provincial Surveillance Commission in March 2018. Previously he served as director and deputy party chief of the State-owned Assets Supervision and Administration Commission of Heilongjiang Government.

== Early life and education ==
Han was born in Qing'an County, Heilongjiang in April 1963. After the Cultural Revolution in September 1982, he entered Daqing Petroleum Institute (now Northeast Petroleum University), where he received a Bachelor of Engineering. He completed his doctor's degree in management science and engineering from Harbin Engineering University in 2008.

== Career ==
After graduation in July 1986, he was assigned to Daqing Petroleum Administration Bureau, a state-owned company and a subsidiary of China National Petroleum Corporation (CNPC) responsible for the management of oil where he worked for more than seven years. He assumed various posts there, including trainee, party chief and manager.

In September 1993 he was promoted to become head of the CPC Daqing Committee Organization Department, a position he held until November 1998. He served as deputy secretary general of Daqing government in February 1998, and five years later promoted to the principal position. In October 2002 he was elected as executive vice-mayor of Daqing, and held that office until February 2008. Then he was transferred to Harbin, capital of Heilongjiang province, and served as deputy secretary general of Heilongjiang government. But having held the position for only two years, he was transferred again to Qiqihar, the second largest city in Heilongjiang province and the political, economic, cultural center of western Heilongjiang, and was appointed deputy party chief, party group chief and mayor of the city. He rose to become party chief, the top political position in the city in June 2012. At the same time, he concurrently served as director of Qiqihar Municipal People's Congress. In June 2016, he was installed as director and deputy party chief of the State-owned Assets Supervision and Administration Commission of Heilongjiang Government.

== Investigation ==
On March 23, 2018, Han was placed under investigation by the Heilongjiang Provincial Surveillance Commission. On September 8, he was expelled from the Chinese Communist Party (CCP) and dismissed from public office.

Government offices
Preceded by Liu Gang (刘刚)	Mayor of Qiqihar; 2010–2012	Succeeded by Guo Xinshuang (郭新双)
Preceded by Zhao Jie (赵杰)	Director of the State-owned Assets Supervision and Administration Commission of Heilongjiang Government; 2016–2018	Succeeded by Wang Zhikui (王智奎)
Party political offices
Preceded by Hao Huilong (郝会龙)	Communist Party Secretary of Qiqihar; 2012–2016	Succeeded by Sun Shen (孙珅)
Assembly seats
Preceded by Hao Huilong (郝会龙)	Chairman of the Standing Committee of Qiqihar People's Congress; 2012–2016	Succeeded by Sun Shen (孙珅)
