= Pipe-laying ship =

Ship type used to lay subsea pipelines

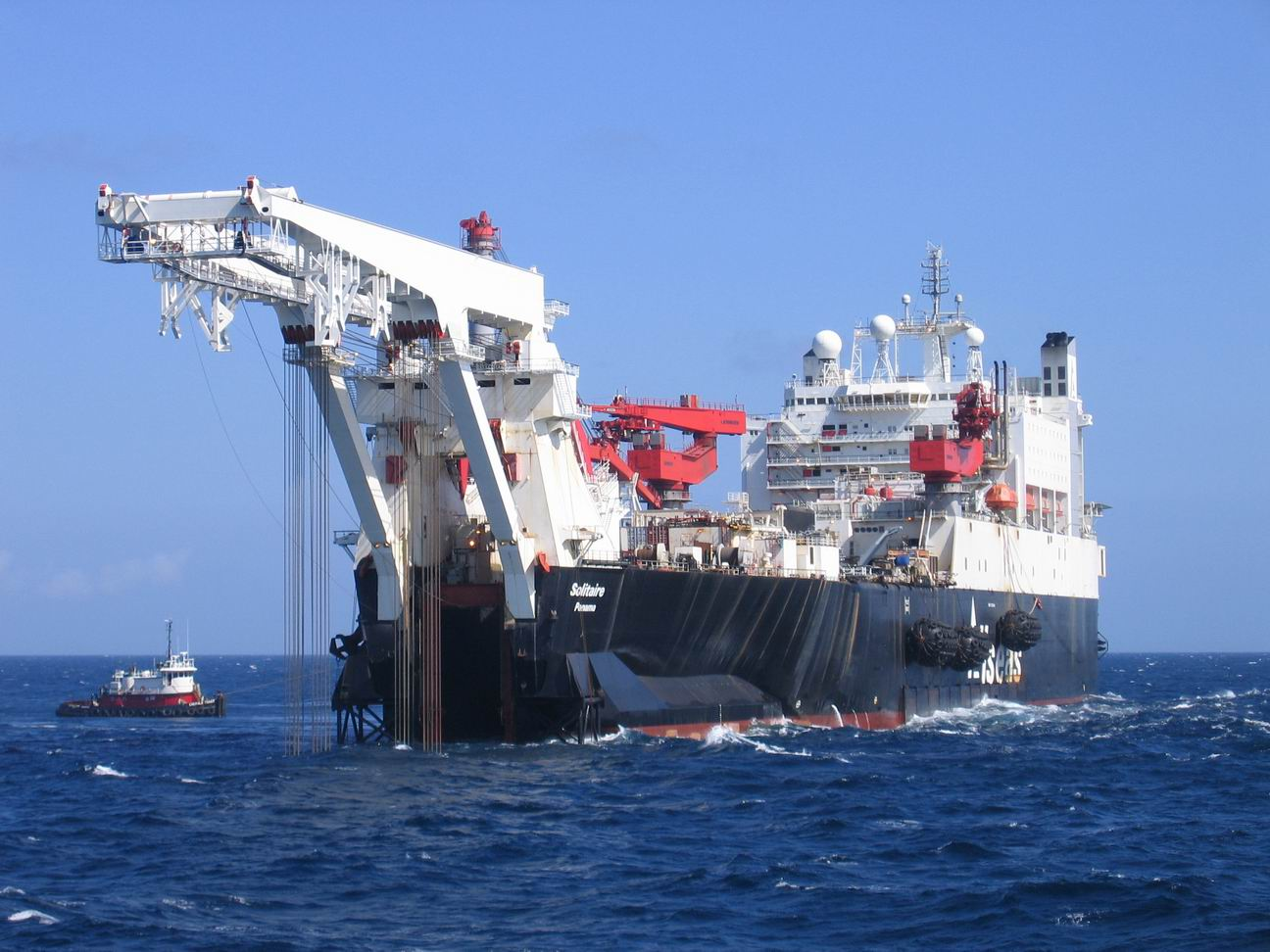
Solitaire, one of the largest in the world

A pipelaying ship is a maritime vessel used in the construction of subsea infrastructure. It serves to connect oil production platforms with refineries on shore. To accomplish this goal a typical pipelaying vessel carries a heavy lift crane, used to install pumps and valves, and equipment to lay pipe between subsea structures.

Lay methods consist of J-lay and S-lay and can be reel-lay or welded length by length. Pipelaying ships make use of dynamic positioning systems or anchor spreads to maintain the correct position and speed while laying pipe.

Recent advances have been made, with pipe being laid in water depths of more than 2,500 metres (8,200 ft).

The term "pipelaying vessel" or "pipelayer" refers to all vessels capable of laying pipe on the ocean floor. It can also refer to "dual activity" ships. These vessels are capable of laying pipe on the ocean floor in addition to their primary job. Examples of dual activity pipelayers include barges, modified bulk carriers, modified drillships, and semi-immersible laying vessels, among others.

A number of national oil companies own and operate pipe laying barges for offshore oil projects. HYSY 202 was the first pipelaying barge to be built in China.

== See also ==
- Offshore geotechnical engineering – Sub-field of engineering concerned with human-made structures in the sea
- Submarine pipeline – Pipeline that is laid on the seabed or below it inside a trench
- Pipelayer – Skilled tradesperson
