= Liu He (engineer) =

Chinese engineer

- 刘合
- Born: 25 March 1961 (age 65); Harbin, Heilongjiang, China
- Education: Northeast Petroleum University; Harbin Engineering University
- Scientific career
- Fields: Engineering management
- Workplaces: Research Institute of Petroleum Exploration and Development

Chinese name
- Simplified Chinese: 刘合
- Traditional Chinese: 劉合
Transcriptions
Standard Mandarin
- Hanyu Pinyin: Liú Hé

Liu He (born 25 March 1961) is a Chinese engineer who is deputy chief engineer of the Research Institute of Petroleum Exploration and Development, an academician of the Chinese Academy of Engineering, and honorary dean of School of Economics and Management, Northeast Petroleum University.

== Biography ==
Liu was born in Harbin, Heilongjiang, on 25 March 1961. After graduating from Daqing Petroleum Institute (Northeast Petroleum University) in 1982, he was despatched to Daqing Oilfield as a technician. He earned a B.S. degree from Daqing Petroleum Institute and a Ph.D degree in engineering from Harbin Engineering University. In March 2018, he was engaged by Harbin Engineering University as a part-time professor.

== Honours and awards ==
- 2005 State Science and Technology Progress Award (Second Class)
- 2008 State Science and Technology Progress Award (Second Class)
- 2010 State Science and Technology Progress Award (Special Prize)
- 2014 Guanghua Engineering Technology Award
- 27 November 2017 Member of the Chinese Academy of Engineering (CAE)
