= Zhang Jing (politician) =

Chinese engineer and politician

- 张晶
- Born: 1982 (age 43–44); Anda, Heilongjiang, China
- Education: Northeast Petroleum University
- Occupation: Engineer
- Years active: 2008–present
- Organization: China Petroleum Daqing Oilfield Drilling Engineering Company
- Political party: Chinese Communist Party

Chinese name
- Simplified Chinese: 张晶
- Traditional Chinese: 張晶
Transcriptions
Standard Mandarin
- Hanyu Pinyin: Zhāng Jīng

Zhang Jing (Chinese: 张晶; born 1982) is a Chinese engineer and politician. He is an alternate member of the 20th Central Committee of the Chinese Communist Party.

== Career ==
Zhang was born in Anda, Heilongjiang, in 1982. After graduating from Daqing Petroleum Institute (now Northeast Petroleum University) in 2008, he became a member of the 15567 Drilling Team of the 2nd Drilling Company of Daqing Oilfield Drilling Engineering Company, a subsidiary of China National Petroleum Corporation. In 2010, he was transferred to the 15173 Drilling Team, serving as deputy captain. In 2017, Zhang was again transferred, this time to serve as captain of the 15168 Drilling Team. In 2018, he was chosen as the 21st captain of the 1205 Drilling Team.

On 22 October 2022, he was selected as an alternate member of the 20th Central Committee of the Chinese Communist Party. On 15 September 2023, the Propaganda Department of the Heilongjiang Provincial Committee awarded Zhang the title of "Model of Longjiang" (Chinese: 龙江楷模) for his outstanding contributions to the oil and gas industry.

== Awards ==
- 2021 National May Day Labor Medal
