= Chen Kezheng =

Chinese materials engineer

- 陈克正

President of Qingdao University of Science and Technology, China
- Incumbent
- Assumed office September 2019

Personal details
- Born: October 1965 (age 60)
- Education: Shandong University, Dalian University of Technology

Chen Kezheng is currently president of Qingdao University of Science and Technology, China. He is a materials engineer.

== Early life ==
Chen studied at Shandong University, China, and graduated with a master's degree in materials in 1989.

In 1997, he received his Ph.D. degree in materials engineering from Dalian University of Technology, China.

== Career ==
From 2000 to 2005, he conducted postdoc work at the University of Florida, Department of Physics. He then joined Qingdao University of Science and Technology (QUST), where he later became dean of School of Materials Engineering. In 2016, he was appointed deputy president of QUST. In September 2019, he was appointed president of QUST.

== Awards ==
He has received several national invention technology awards, along with Shandong provincial technology awards.
