= Aban Offshore =

India's offshore drilling services provider pvt company

Aban Offshore Ltd.
- Formerly: Aban Loyd Chiles Offshore Ltd. (1986–2006)
- Type: Public company
- Traded as: BSE: 523204; NSE: ABAN
- Industry: Oilfield services
- Founded: 1986; 40 years ago
- Founder: M.A. Abraham
- Headquarters: Chennai, Tamil Nadu, India
- Key people: Reji Abraham (Managing Director)
- Services: Drilling
- Revenue: ▼₹1,326.62 crore (US$140 million) (2021)
- Operating income: ▼₹−886.52 crore (US$−92 million) (2021)
- Net income: ▼₹−1,972.53 crore (US$−200 million) (2021)
- Total assets: ▼₹4,619.29 crore (US$480 million) (2021)
- Total equity: ▼₹−16,822.76 crore (US$−1.7 billion) (2021)
- Number of employees: 27
- Website: abanoffshore.com

Aban Offshore (formerly Aban Loyd Chiles Offshore Ltd.) is an Indian multinational offshore drilling services provider headquartered in Chennai. Its services are mainly used by oil companies, especially for ONGC. The company listed on the Bombay Stock Exchange.

The group has also ventured into construction, offshore and onshore drilling, wind energy and power generation, Information Technology enabled services, hotels and resorts, tea plantations and in marketing.

== Financials ==
In 2021, the company reported consolidated net loss of Rs 1972.53 crore.

== Controversies ==
=== Central Bank of India Insolvency Case ===
Central Bank of India filed an application under Section 7 of the Insolvency and Bankruptcy Code, 2016, against Aban Offshore Ltd, for defaulting on loans. The bank aimed to initiate insolvency proceedings for recovery of outstanding dues.

In August 2022, Aban Offshore entered into a one time settlement agreement with Central Bank of India. Under the agreement, Aban Offshore paid the outstanding principal of ₹121.78 crore (equivalent to ₹141 crore or US$15 million in 2026) to the bank.

After the payment and settlement, the Central Bank of India withdrew its insolvency case against Aban Offshore Ltd at the National Company Law Tribunal.

=== Aban Loyd Chiles Customs Case ===
In 2015, the Directorate of Revenue Intelligence seized the vessel on grounds of alleged unauthorized deployment beyond the contractual zone. The company challenged the imposition of penalties and customs duty, arguing that the use and deployment of Aban-ICE complied with amended essentiality certificates from governmental authorities such as the Directorate General of Hydrocarbons.

=== Sanctions and OFAC Settlement ===
Aban Offshore's Singapore subsidiary was penalized by the U.S. Office of Foreign Assets Control for violating Iranian sanctions regulations in 2017. The violation involved re-exporting U.S.-origin goods to Iran without proper authorization. Aban agreed to a settlement and paid a civil monetary penalty.
