= Su Shulin =

Chinese oil and gas executive and politician (born 1962)

- 苏树林

Governor of Fujian
- In office 2 April 2011 – 7 October 2015
- Preceded by: Huang Xiaojing
- Succeeded by: Yu Weiguo

Personal details
- Born: 14 March 1962 (age 64) Kedong County, Heilongjiang
- Party: Chinese Communist Party (expelled)
- Education: Harbin Institute of Technology; Daqing Petroleum Institute

Su Shulin (Chinese: 苏树林; pinyin: Sū Shùlín; born 14 March 1962) is a Chinese oil and gas executive and former politician. Between 2011 and 2015, he served as Governor of Fujian, on China's eastern coast. Before beginning his political career, Su served as the vice-president in the state-owned PetroChina Company Limited. He later became chief executive of Sinopec Group. In 2011, Su was named Governor of Fujian. He was investigated by the Central Commission for Discipline Inspection in 2015 and subsequently expelled from the Chinese Communist Party for violating organizational discipline. He was sentenced to sixteen years in prison upon being convicted on charges of bribery and abuse of power.

== Biography ==
Su Shulin traces his heritage to Dong'e County, Shandong province. In 1962, Su was born into a large family of poor farmers living in Northeastern China. His given name, "Shulin", literally means "forest". He had six siblings. His father died when he was 14 years old. He graduated from Daqing Petroleum Institute and received a master's degree at the Harbin Institute of Technology. He is a senior engineer with many years experience in China's oil and gas industry, working mostly in the Daqing oil field of Liaoning province.

From August 2000 to March 2001, Su acted as Deputy General Manager of China National Petroleum Corporation, Vice President of PetroChina Company Limited, chairman, General Manager and Secretary to the Party Committee of Daqing Oilfield Company Limited as well as Vice Secretary to the Party Committee of CNPC Daqing Petroleum Administration Bureau. From December 2003 to September 2006, Su acted as Deputy General Manager and member of the Party Committee of China National Petroleum Corporation, Director and Senior Vice President of PetroChina Company Limited. From September 2006 to October 2006, Su was selected as a member of the Standing Committee of the provincial Party Committee of Liaoning Province, working under Li Keqiang. In October 2006, Su was appointed as the Head of the Organization Department of Liaoning Provincial Committee.

In June 2007, he was appointed as president and Secretary of the Party Leadership Group of Sinopec Group Company. Su was elected as Director and chairman on Third Session of the Board of Directors of Sinopec Corp in August 2007.

== Fujian governor and investigation ==
In 2011, Su resigned from Sinopec after being named Governor of Fujian province. At the time of his appointment, he was one of only a handful of provincial leaders in China born after 1960, and therefore was initially considered a promising candidate to enter the top ranks of the national leadership. However, his fortunes receded following the 18th Party Congress due to a widespread shake-up of the state oil sector, particularly after the downfall of former oil boss and Politburo Standing Committee member Zhou Yongkang and his associates. Xu Gang, vice governor who worked under Su, was investigated for corruption in March 2015. Su's former associate, Liao Yongyuan, chief executive of China National Petroleum Corporation, was rounded up for investigation in March 2015. When Liao and Su were both rising in the corporate ranks of big oil companies, the media took note of the fact that they were both born in the year of the Tiger on the Chinese zodiac, so Liao was nicknamed the "northwestern tiger" while Su was called the "northeastern tiger". This provided for an ironic twist years later when both of them fell under the anti-corruption dragnet (Xi Jinping had referred to high-ranking corrupt officials as "tigers").

In the late evening on 7 October 2015, the Central Commission for Discipline Inspection made an abrupt announcement that Su was under investigation for "serious violations of regulations." Su was the first sitting governor to be investigated by the CCDI since the 18th Party Congress, and the seventh full member of the 18th Central Committee to fall from grace. Though he was put under investigation, he kept his governor position until his resignation was accepted by The Fujian Province People's Congress on 3 November.

On 4 July 2017, the CCDI announced the results of the internal party investigation into Su Shulin. The agency said that Su "severely violated political discipline and political rules", attempted to gain information on the inspection, engaged in "non-organizational activities", resisted investigation, promoted individuals in violation of party regulations, placed his personal interests above that of the state. Su was said to have "indiscriminately abused his power" and led to the serious loss of state assets; he severely violated the "Eight-point Regulation", used public funds for personal expenses, used public funds to support the travel of family and friends, used publicly assigned vehicles for personal purposes, used his position of power to help relatives secure real estate at below-market prices. He was indicted on charges of abuse of power and bribery.

Su was an alternate member of the 16th and 17th Central Committees of the Chinese Communist Party. Su is a full member of the 18th Central Committee.

On 26 July 2018, Su was sentenced to 16 years in prison and fined three million yuan for taking bribes worth 36.22 million yuan and abusing of power by the Shanghai Second Intermediate People's Court.
