= Qingdao University of Science and Technology =

University in Qingdao, Shandong, China

- 青岛科技大学
- Motto: 明德、笃学、弘毅、拓新
- Motto in English: Develop virtue, be diligent in study, have a broad mind, pursue innovation
- Type: Public
- Established: 1950; 76 years ago
- President: Chen Kezheng (陈克正)
- Faculty: 1,645
- Students: Around 30,000
- Undergraduates: 27,000
- Postgraduates: 3,000
- Location: Qingdao, Shandong, China; 36.119°N 120.479°E
- Campus: Three campuses, one urban and two suburban, 225 hectares (560 acres)
- Colors: Orange and Blue
- Nickname: Qingkeda (青科大)
- Website: http://www.qust.edu.cn

Chinese name
- Simplified Chinese: 青岛科技大学
- Traditional Chinese: 青島科技大學
Transcriptions
Standard Mandarin
- Hanyu Pinyin: Qīngdǎo Kējì Dàxué

The Qingdao University of Science and Technology (QUST) is a provincial public university located in Qingdao, China. Having evolved from a college specializing in the chemical industry, it is now a comprehensive, multi-disciplinary university offering academic degrees in science, technology, humanities, business, management, medicine, law and arts.

The school encompasses four campuses in Sifang and Laoshan districts of Qingdao and Gaomi district of Weifang and Jinan district of Shandong.

== History ==
The origin of the university lies in the Shenyang Light Industry Vocational School (沈阳轻工业高级职业学校) which was founded in 1950. For that purpose, the government of the Northeast Region choose to put the premises of the Shenyang Wenhui Middle School (沈阳文会中学), a catholic school operating since 1876, to new use. Since being run by the Christian Church meant that the Wenhui School had soon to close, an agreement was reached beforehand in order to ensure the transition of both the teaching staff and the students. In accordance with the economic needs of the time, chemistry, paper making and rubber production made up the core curriculum for the higher education branch, while the former middle school continued its operation under the auspices of this new institution. The first three vocational classes enrolled in October 1950, numbering 128 students in total.

The school didn't remain in Shenyang for long. In December 1954, the Ministry of Light Industry decided to move the whole institution to Qingdao, where more expertise was needed to further the development of the local rubber-industry. Thus, in September 1956 the Qingdao Rubber Industry School (青岛橡胶工业学校) opened its gates, having moved teachers, students and equipment from Liaoning to Shandong Province. During those years, the area lay at the outskirts of the city proper and was far from being urbanized. In 1958, under the name Shandong College of Chemical Industry (山东化工学院), it became directly subordinated to the Ministry of Chemical Industry and given the right to award bachelor's degrees. During the Cultural Revolution, the college suffered a sharp decline in the range of subjects to only three, namely Rubber Machinery, Chemical Machinery and Rubber Products, in 1968. The length of studies was also shortened to only two years, and in 1972, it was required for the school to recruit workers, peasants and soldiers as students (工农兵学员). Things started to look brighter in 1977, when the Gaokao was reinstated as prerequisite to higher education, and the college was able to enroll 443 new students for Bachelor-level studies.

The right to recruit student for master's degrees in technical fields was awarded in 1980. Distance education was introduced in 1981, starting with 91 students at the time. Since 1985 the college was called Qingdao Institute of Chemical Industry (青岛化工学院), a change of name that was considered a downgrade by a lot of students and teachers alike and thus not warmly welcomed. Contrary to the reservations expressed at the time, it didn't harm the institutions further development of the institution. On the contrary was the range of subjects steadily expanded in the following decades, including the expansion from three to six faculties, including Foreign Languages and Computer Sciences, in 1993, bringing the number of students close to 3,963 and the number of bachelor courses to 17. Another big step towards a comprehensive university was done with the incorporation of the Qingdao Arts and Crafts School (青岛工艺美术学校) in 2001. That same year, the number of students reached 10,747. The biggest change and expansion yet followed in 2002, when full university status was granted and the school adopted its current and final name, Qingdao University of Science and Technology. In September 2002, the new campus in Laoshan was inaugurated. In 2006, the College of Communication and Animation was opened and several language majors added to the School of Foreign Languages. A third campus was opened in 2009 in Gaomi, marking the expansion of the university beyond the borders of Qingdao. The establishment of a Middle School Affiliated to Qingdao University of Science and Technology in Laoshan district (青岛科技大学附属学校) commenced in 2014.

== Academics ==
Qingdao University of Science and Technology is one of the nine Provincial Key Universities of Shandong (山东省属重点高校). It was ranked 45th among engineering universities on the Mainland in 2013. In 2011, it was included in the first national Excellence Plan for Engineering Education (卓越工程师教育培养计划). The three campuses together cover an area of 700,000 m^{2}. The total value of fixed assets is estimated at 2,200 billion yuan. Spread over five branches, the foundation of the University Library dates back to 1950. It now covers a building area of around 50,000m^{2} and contains over 2.4 million volumes, including digital ones.

The university offers three first level and 22 second level doctoral programs and four postdoctoral research stations, 20 first level and 125 second level master programs and 68 undergraduate programs. Chemistry and materials science are the most renowned majors offered, with the Key Laboratory of Rubber-plastics as well as the Key Laboratory of Eco-chemical Engineering of the Ministry of Education being hosted by the university. Several post-doctoral programs in those fields are also available. Joint research centers have been set up with several international companies, including the LANXESS Rubber Research Center Qingdao.

Five majors are accredited as being distinguished on a national level (国家级特色专业), those include:

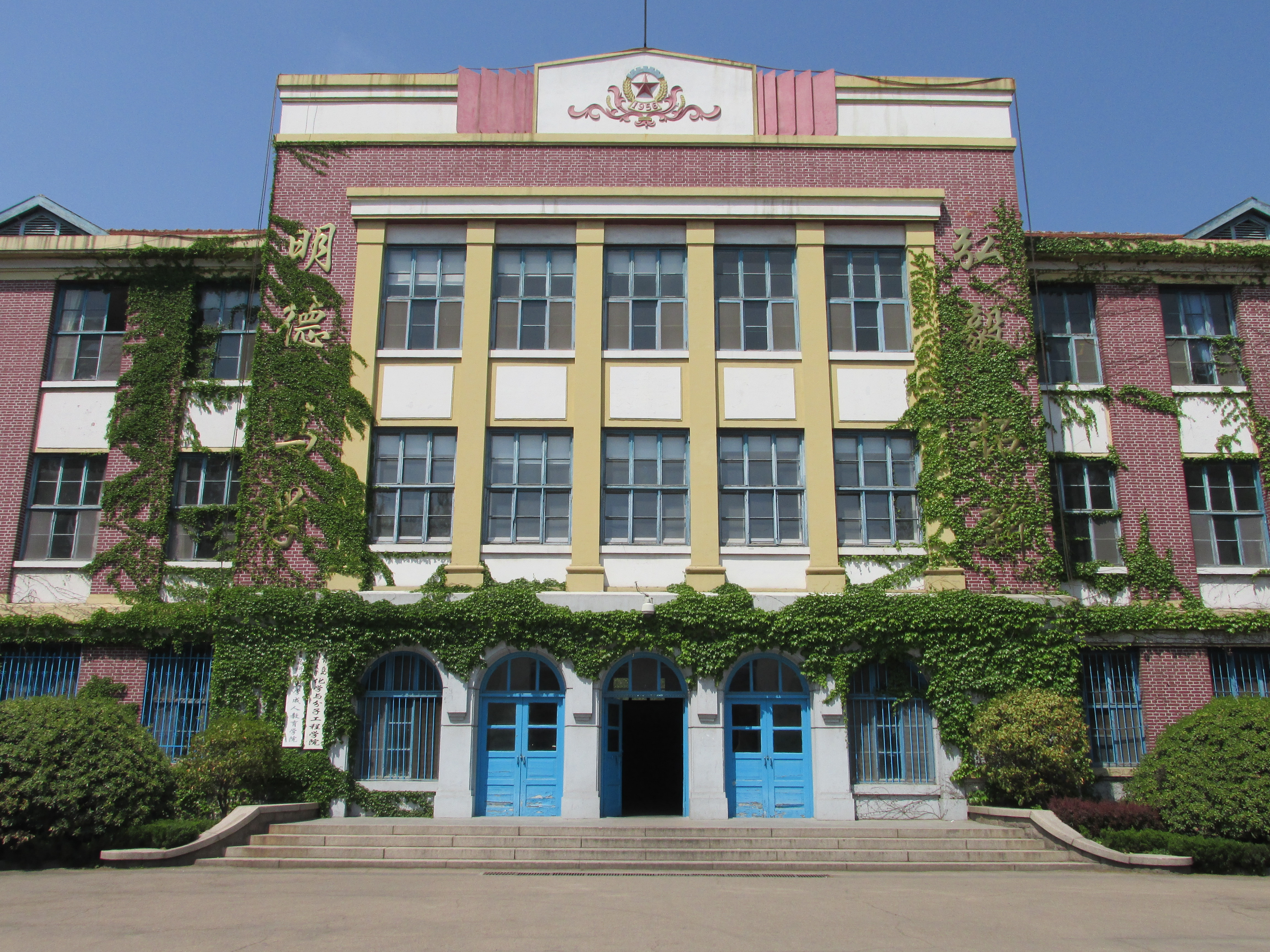
Main Building on Sifang Campus

- Chemical Engineering and Technology
- Applied Chemistry
- Polymer Materials and Engineering
- Mechanical Engineering and Automation,
- Process Equipment and Control Engineering

The aforementioned as well as the following majors are accredited as being distinguished on a provincial level (省级品牌特色专业):

- Materials Chemistry
- Automation
- Electronic Information Engineering
- Business Administration
- English Language Studies

The university is an official test center for the TOEIC and the Italian language CELI exam.

=== Jinan Campus ===
School Address (Jinan Campus): No. 80 Wenhua East Road, Jinan City, Shandong Province.

=== Sifang Campus ===
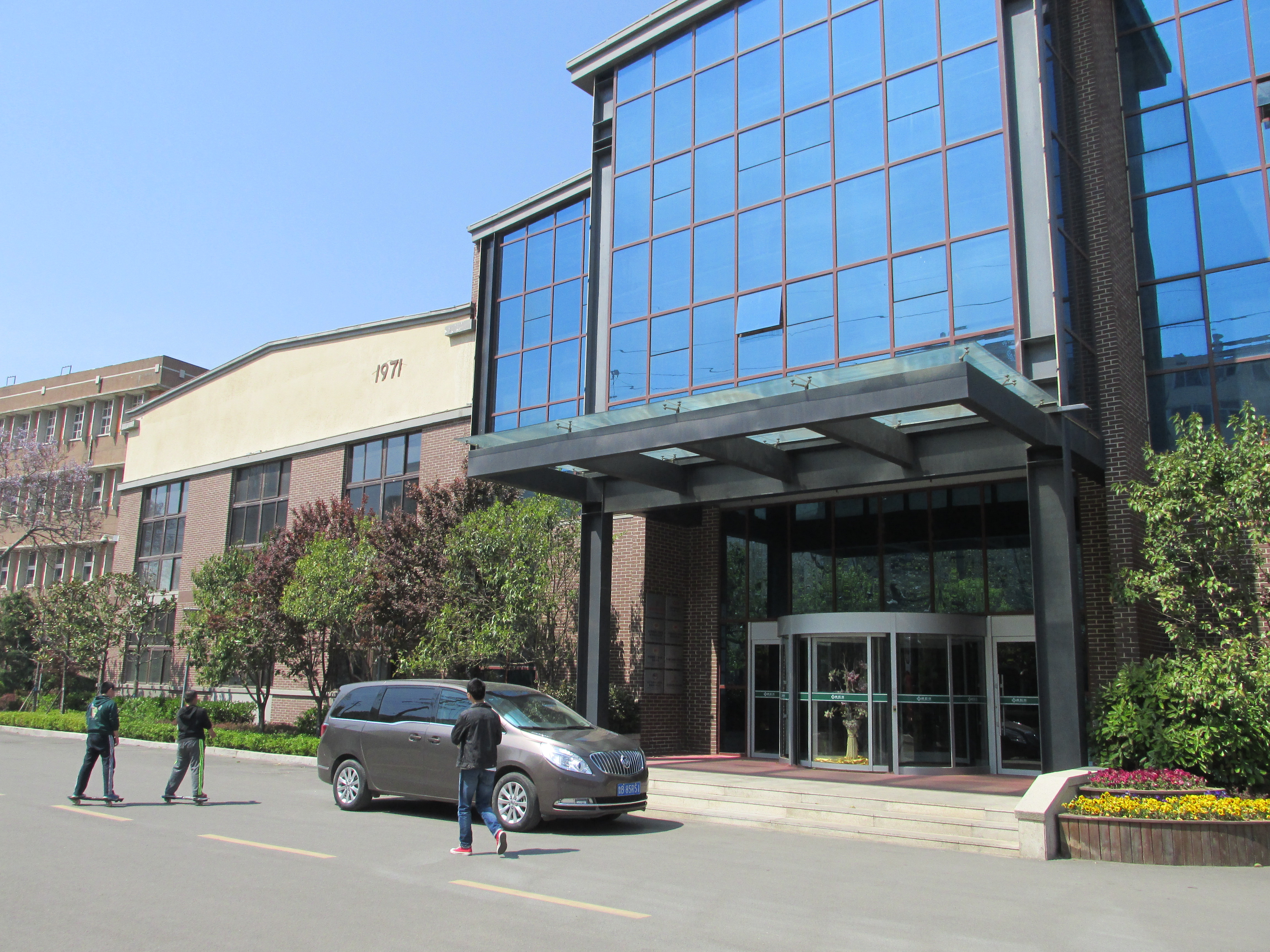
Rubber Valley Company Headquarters at Sifang Campus

The oldest campus of the university is located in Sifang district near the eastern end of Jiaozhou Bay Bridge. It is renowned for its beautiful main building, which was built in 1956 and inspired by the soviet architecture of the time. Most majors that form the core profile of the university are still based in Sifang. A large cluster of high-end chemical and rubber industries, the so-called Rubber Valley (橡胶谷), is located adjacent to the campus, as is the science park of the university.

School address (Sifang Campus): No. 53 Zhengzhou Road, Qingdao City, Shandong Province.

- College of Chemical Engineering 化工学院
- College of Chemistry and Molecular Engineering 化学与分子工程学院
- School of Polymer Science and Engineering 高分子科学与工程学院
- College of Materials Science and Engineering 材料科学与工程学院
- College of Environment and Safety Engineering 环境与安全工程学院
- College of Adult Vocational Education 成教学院高职学院

=== Laoshan Campus ===
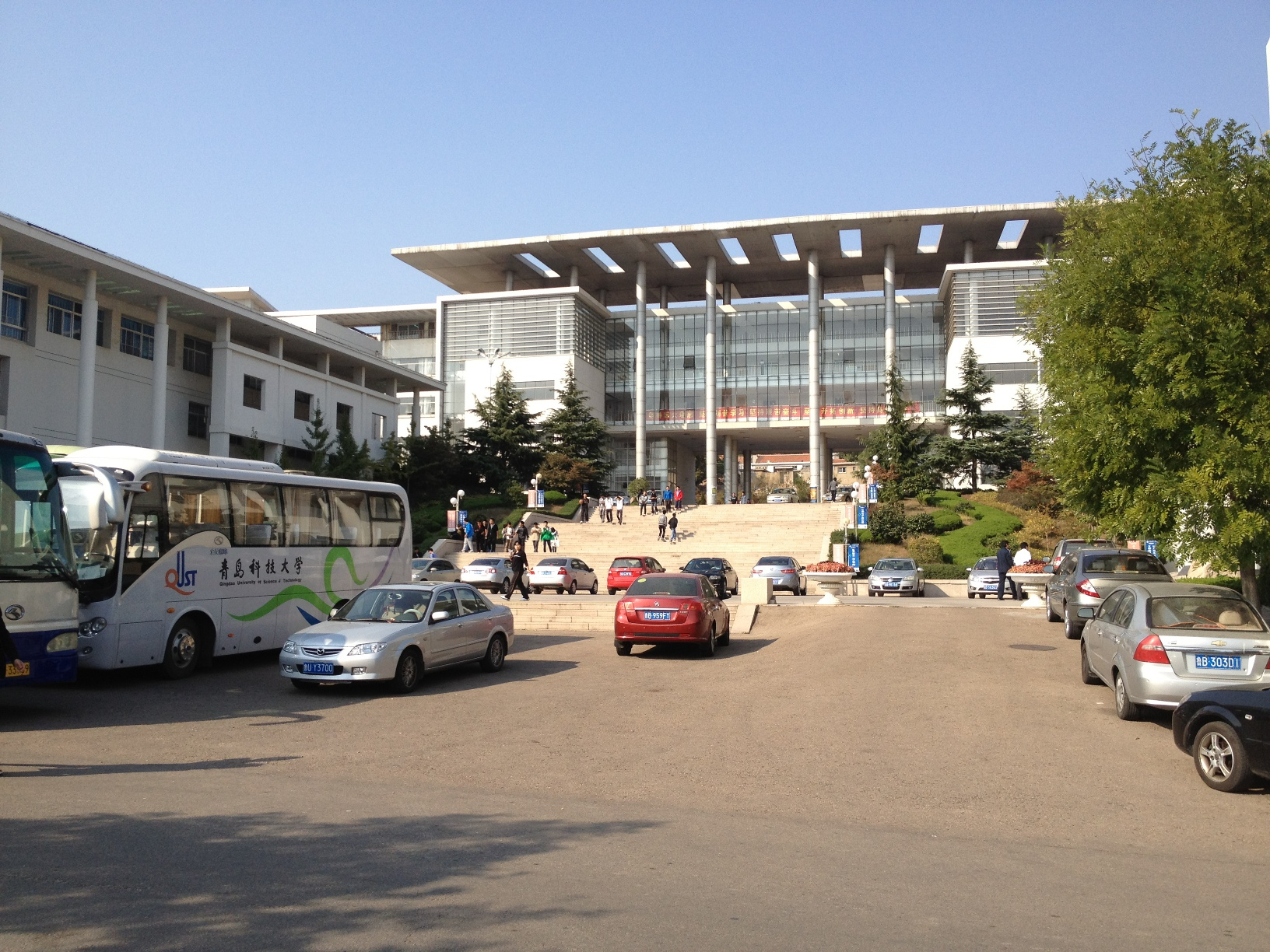
Hongyi Lou (弘毅楼), the main teaching building on Laoshan Campus

The biggest in area campus was inaugurated in 2002. It is located in near many tourist hotspots, including Mount Lao (Lauschan) (崂山) and the Shilaoren Beach (石老人海水浴场). In addition to the faculties that were added as part of the transition into a comprehensive university, Laoshan Campus also includes the main administration and library. While construction of the southern part of the campus, called Nanyuan (南苑), was already finished in the years following its inauguration, the campus district of Beiyuan (北苑) was opened in 2012 and is still being expanded.

School address (Laoshan Campus): No. 99 Songling Road, Qingdao City, Shandong Province.

- College of Electromechanical Engineering 机电工程学院
- College of Mathematics 数理学院
- School of Information Sciences and Technology 信息科学技术学院
- School of Foreign Languages 外国语学院
- College of Economics and Management 经济与管理学院
- College of the Arts 艺术学院
- College of Communication and Animation 传播与动漫学院
- College of Marxism 马克思主义学院
- Law School 政法学院
- Department of Sports 体育教学部
- Sino-German Technology College 中德科技学院
- College of International Cooperation 国际合作学院
- College of Automation and Electronic Engineering 自动化与电子工程学院

=== Gaomi Campus ===
Several branches of the main faculties are located at Gaomi Campus, with most majors offered in Economics, Chemical and Computer sciences. The courses for Associates degree level of studies are also based here, with 22 majors offered in total. 4,000 students are enrolled and 260 teacher employed in Gaomi. Same as in Laoshan, this campus is also undergoing further construction.

School Address (Gaomi Campus): No.1 Xingtan West Street, Gaomi City, Shandong Province.

- Qingdao University of Science and Technology, Gaomi Campus 青岛科技大学高密校区

=== International cooperation ===
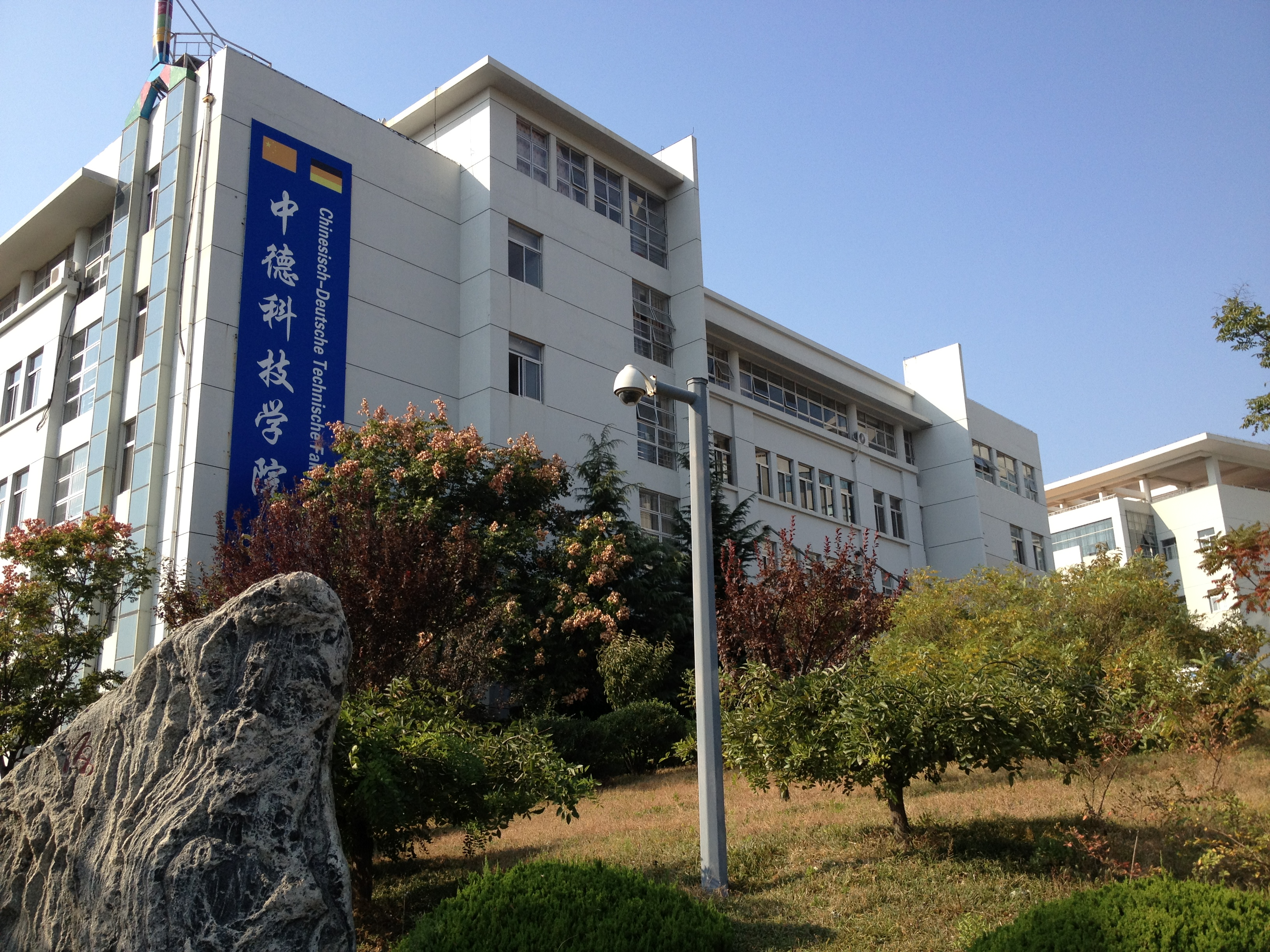
College building of the Sino-German Technology College at Laoshan Campus

Qingdao University of Science and Technology has a strong partnership with the University of Paderborn, Germany, that has resulted in the establishment of the Sino-German Technology College on Laoshan Campus. Students who pass the requirements set by the universities and the DAAD can finish their Bachelor-studies in several German universities and have the opportunity to do a master's degree there. Cooperation agreements exist with over 60 educational institutions in 16 countries and territories. Universities that have an agreement on teachers exchange with QUST include:

- City University of Hong Kong, Hong Kong, China
- Regensburg University of Applied Sciences, Germany
- Institute of the Pacific United New Zealand, New Zealand
- Tambov State Technical University, Russia
- Kongju National University, South Korea
- Kangnam University, South Korea

== Affiliated institutions ==
QUST is unique among universities in Shandong in that it directly sponsor a professional football team, Qingdao University of Science and Technology F.C. QUST has competed in the China League Two and in 2009 made it into the quarter-finals. In addition, the university is also in charge of the Qingdao Sea Eagles F.C. (青岛海之鹰足球俱乐部) that compete in the local Qingdao league. A large number of enterprises, mostly in the rubber and plastics industry, are affiliated to the university.

== Notable faculty and alumni ==
- Wang Zhongyu (1933- ), Governor of Jilin Province from 1989 to 1992, graduated in 1953
- Mo Yan (1955- ), novelist and short story writer, winner of Nobel Prize in Literature 2012, visiting professor since 2011
- Wang Tianpu (1962- ), president of Sinopec Corporation, graduated with a Bachelor of Engineering in 1985
