= Berge G. Larsen =

Norwegian businessperson (born 1952)

Berge Gerdt Larsen (born 16 November 1952) is a Norwegian businessperson.

Larsen graduated from University of Newcastle with a Bachelor of Science in chemical engineering and from University of Texas at Austin with a Master of Business Administration.

From 1989 to 1995 he was managing director of Odfjell Drilling. He was chief executive officer of DNO ASA from 1996 to 2002, and has served as the executive chairman of their board of directors since 2002. He has also served as chairman of the Norwegian Rig Owners' Association and Bergen Shipowners' Association.

Larsen has a taxable net worth of about US$158 million.

== Tax affairs ==
Larsen was investigated by Norwegian authorities over an alleged multi-million kroner tax evasion, but he was acquitted by theGulating Court of Appeals on 31. August 2016. The Judgment is final. He is expected to file very substantial claims for compensation after being wrongly investigated for more than 10 years.
