= Awilco Offshore =

Norwegian drilling rig operator

Awilco Offshore ASA
- Industry: Drilling
- Founded: 2005
- Defunct: 2008
- Fate: Acquired by China Oilfield Services
- Headquarters: Oslo, Norway
- Key people: Henrik Fougner (President and CEO), Sigurd Thorvildsen (Chairman of the board)
- Revenue: US$189 million (2007)
- Operating income: ▲$70.3 million (2007)
- Net income: ▲$26.2 million (2007)
- Number of employees: 47 (2007)

Awilco Offshore was a Norwegian drilling rig owner. In 2008 the company operated five jackup rigs and two semi-submersible accommodation rigs, with several others on order. Awilco was founded in 2005, headquartered in Oslo and was listed on the Oslo Stock Exchange. Operation of its rigs was done by the company Premium Drilling, owned by Awilco and Sinvest. The company was acquired by China Oilfield Services in 2008 and merged into its existing operations.

== History ==
The company was founded in February 2005 when it took over the offshore rig assets of Anders Wilhelmsen Group and at the same time acquiring NOK 1 billion in new capital. In August 2005 Awilco bought 20.7% of Petrojack and at the same time performed a new capital expansion. In December 2005 Awilco merged with Offshore Rig Services, taking over the company while issuing new shares to the Offshore Rig Services owners.

=== Takeover ===
The company accepted a $2.5 billion acquisition offer from industry peer China Oilfield Services on 7 July 2008. The deal was approved by the China Securities Regulatory Commission in September and a compulsory acquisition of outstanding shares was completed that November. Awilco Offshore was fully integrated into the firm's local subsidiary COSL Norwegian AS.
