= Zhou Jiping =

Chinese businessman

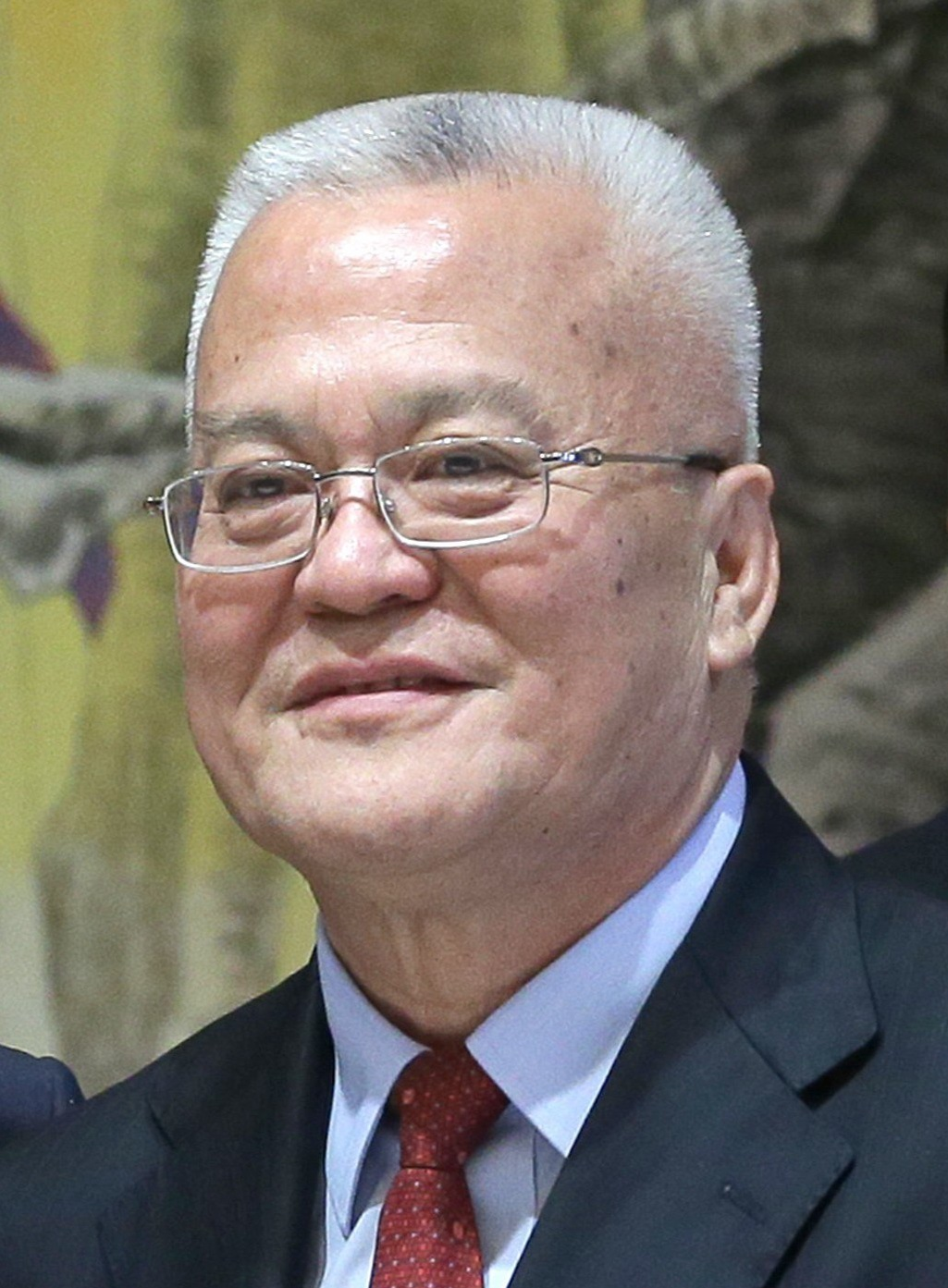
- Born: 1952 (age 73–74)
- Education: China University of Petroleum
- Occupations: CEO and Chairman of China National Petroleum Corporation
- Predecessor: Jiang Jiemin

Zhou Jiping (born 1952) is the general manager and then chairman of the China National Petroleum Corporation (CNPC).

== Education ==
Zhou Jiping graduated from China University of Petroleum in Geology.

== Career ==
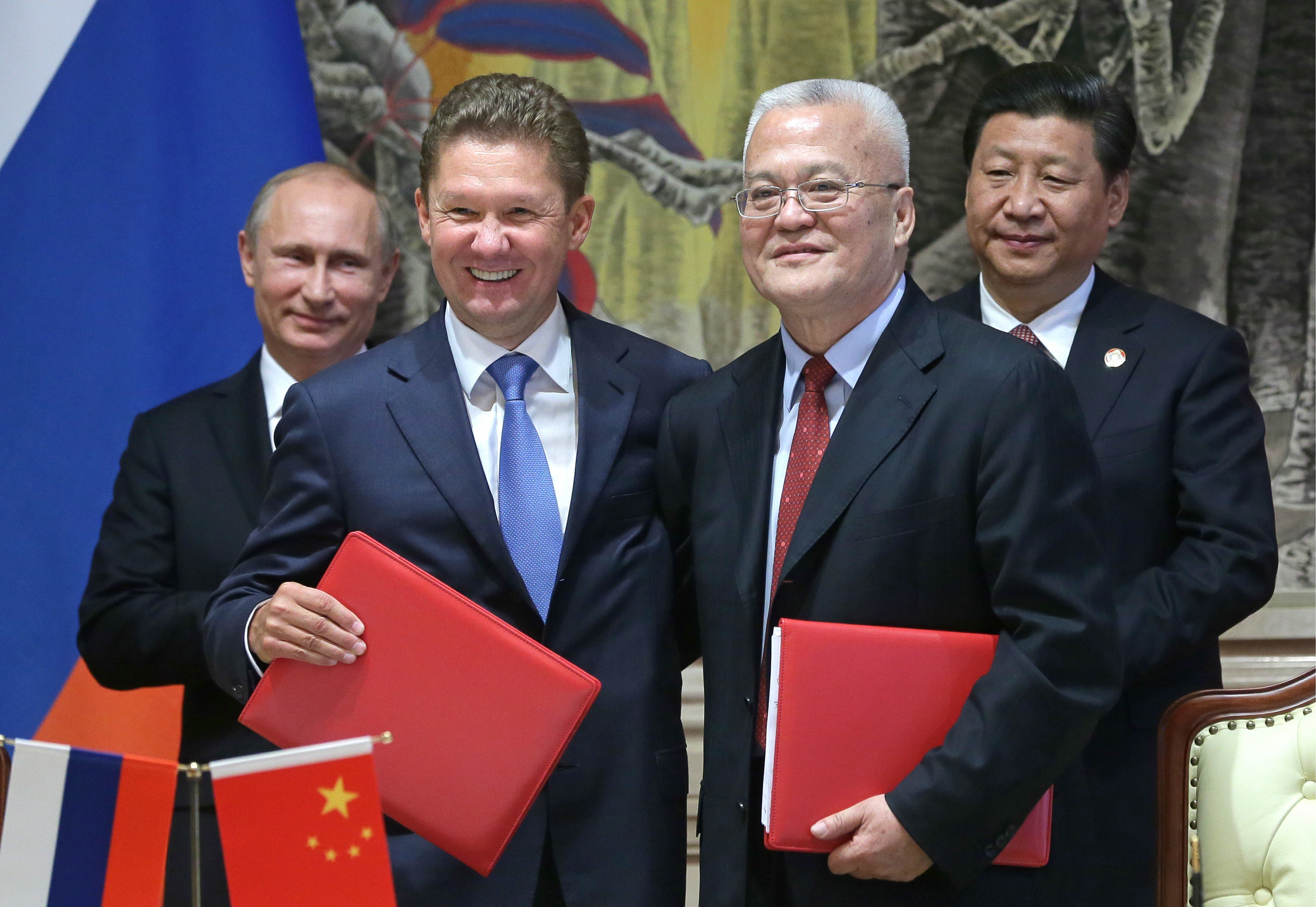
Zhou and Gazprom CEO Alexey Miller sign a $400 billion gas deal for natural gas supplies via the Eastern Route between Gazprom and CNPC, 21 May 2014

Since 2013, Zhou Jiping has been serving as chairman and CEO of China National Petroleum Corporation.
