= Fu Chengyu =

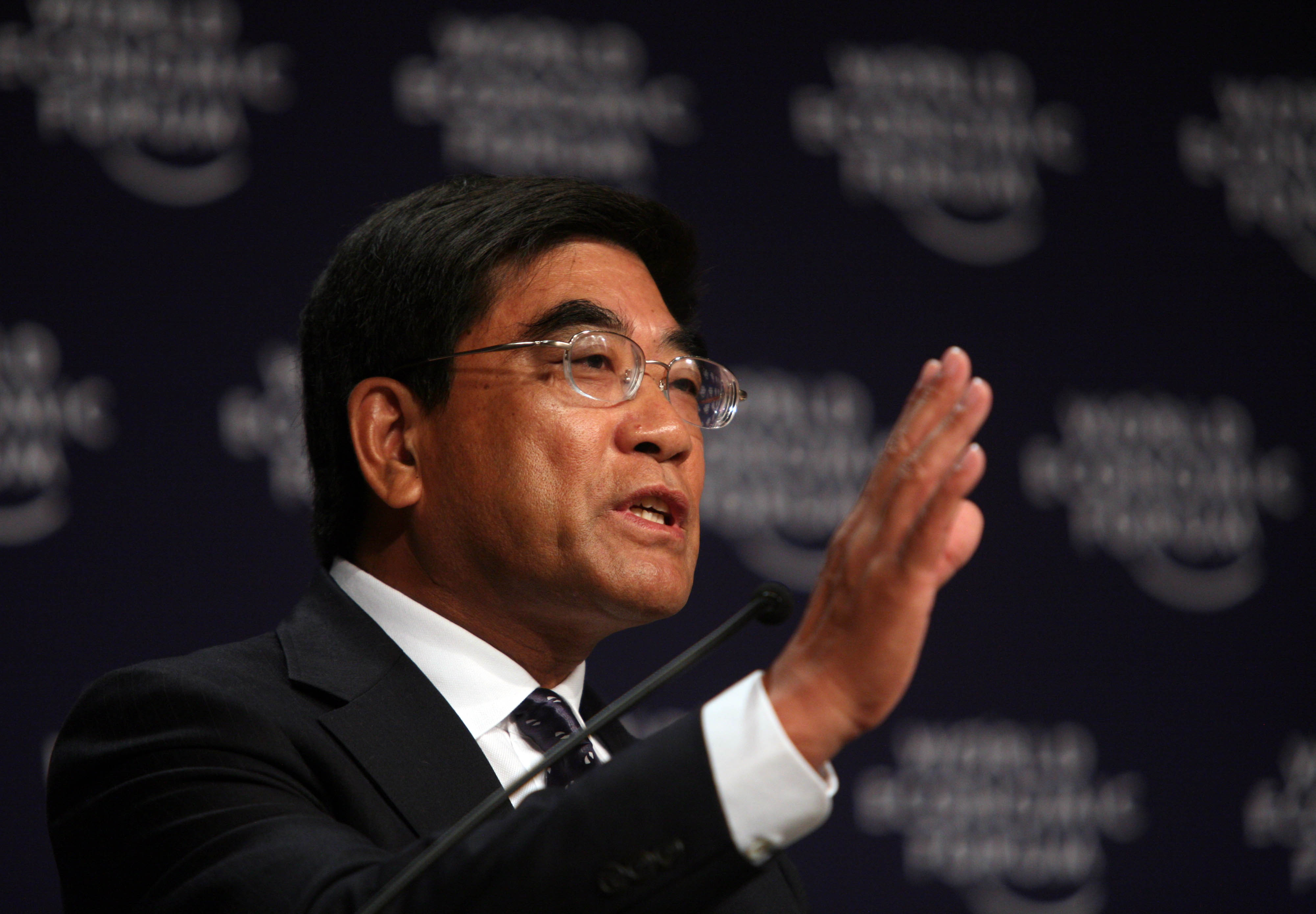
- Fu in 2008
- Born: June 1951 (age 75); Heilongjiang, China
- Education: University of Southern California M.S. Northeast China Institute of Electric Power Engineering B.S.
- Occupation: Businessman
- Political party: Chinese Communist Party

Fu Chengyu (Chinese: 傅成玉; pinyin: Fù Chéngyù) is a former chairman of China Petroleum and Chemical Corp (Sinopec), the largest Asian refiner. He previously worked at the China National Offshore Oil Corporation (CNOOC), which foresaw a five-fold increase in its profits during his presence.

== Biography ==
Fu was born in 1951, and is a Chinese citizen of Han ethnicity. He graduated from the Northeastern University (China), and received a master's degree in petroleum engineering from the University of Southern California. He later studied at Cheung Kong Graduate School of Business. In December 2014, Fu was named among the most influential people in the shipping industry according to Lloyd's List.

His early experiences in the oil industry were at the Daqing, Liaohe and Huabei oilfields.

Beginning with 1983, Fu has been Chairman of the Management Committees of joint ventures between China National Offshore Oil Corporation (CNOOC) and major international petroleum companies including Amoco, Chevron, Texaco, Phillips, Shell and Agip.

In 1994 he became Deputy General Manager of CNOOC Nanhai East Corporation and Vice President of Phillips Asia Inc. A year later he was appointed General Manager of the Xijiang Development Project.

In 1999, he became General Manager of CNOOC Nanhai East Corporation, and few months following that he became executive director, Executive Vice President and Chief Operating Officer of CNOOC Limited, a subsidiary of CNOOC. The following year Fu was named Vice President of CNOOC and concurrent President of CNOOC Limited.

In 2002 he was appointed chairman of the board of directors and CEO of China Oilfield Services Limited (COSL), another subsidiary of CNOOC. He became President of CNOOC, chairman and CEO of CNOOC Limited in 2003.

On 16 September 2010, he resigned from his CEO position at CNOOC Limited while keeping the position of chairman. He finally became the Chairman of the Sinopec Group in April 2011. Fu was retired in 2015.

== Investigation ==
On 31 October 2026, it was announced that Fu was under investigation by Central Commission for Discipline Inspection and National Supervisory Commission, for alleged "serious violations of discipline and law".
