= Sinvest =

Sinvest ASA
- Company type: Public
- Industry: Drilling
- Headquarters: Kristiansand, Norway
- Revenue: ▲NOK 175 million (2005)
- Operating income: NOK 160 million (2005)
- Net income: NOK -95 million (2005)
- Website: www.sinvest.no

Sinvest (OSE: SIN) is a Norwegian oil drilling investment company, with headquarters in Kristiansand. The company is a long-term financial and strategic investor in oil resources and offshore companies and has been listed on the Oslo Stock Exchange since 2001.

Major investments include the subsidiary Deep Drilling Invest that has eight drilling rigs under construction and Beta Drilling that operates one rig. In addition Sinvest has a partial ownership of Petrojack (20%), Premium Drilling (with Awilco Offshore) and Venture Drilling (50%).
