= National oil company =

Type of petroleum company

A national oil company (NOC) is a petroleum company that is fully or partly owned by the government of a sovereign nation. NOCs produce about half the world’s oil and gas.

Due to their increasing dominance over global reserves, the importance of NOCs has risen dramatically in recent decades relative to International Oil Companies (IOCs), such as BP, ExxonMobil or Shell plc. NOCs are also increasingly investing outside their national borders.

== List of companies ==
Country	Company	Date founded	Notes
Abu Dhabi	Abu Dhabi National Oil Company	1971	
Algeria	Sonatrach	1963	
Argentina	YPF	1922	
Azerbaijan	SOCAR	1992	
Bangladesh	Petrobangla	1972	
Bolivia	YPFB	1936	
Brazil	Petrobras	1953	
Canada	Petro-Canada	1975	Privatised in 1991
Chile	Empresa Nacional del Petróleo	1950	
China	China National Offshore Oil Corporation	1982	
China	China National Petroleum Corporation	1988	
China	Sinopec	1982	
Ecuador	Petroecuador	1989	
India	Indian Oil Corporation	1958	
Indonesia	Pertamina	1968	
Iran	National Iranian Oil Company	1951	
Iraq	Iraq National Oil Company	1966	
Kuwait	Kuwait Petroleum Corporation	1980	
Malaysia	Petronas	1974	
Mexico	Pemex	1938	
Nigeria	NNPC	1977	
Norway	Equinor	1972	
Peru	Petroperú	1969	
Qatar	QatarEnergy	1974	
Saudi Arabia	Saudi Aramco	1933	
South Korea	Korea National Oil Corporation	1979	
Turkey	TPAO	1954	
Ukraine	Naftogaz	1991	
Uzbekistan	Uzbekneftegaz	1992	
Venezuela	PDVSA	1976	
Vietnam	Petrovietnam	1977	

== See also ==
- List of petroleum companies
- Nationalization of oil supplies
- State-owned enterprise
