= China National Offshore Oil Corporation =

Chinese national oil company

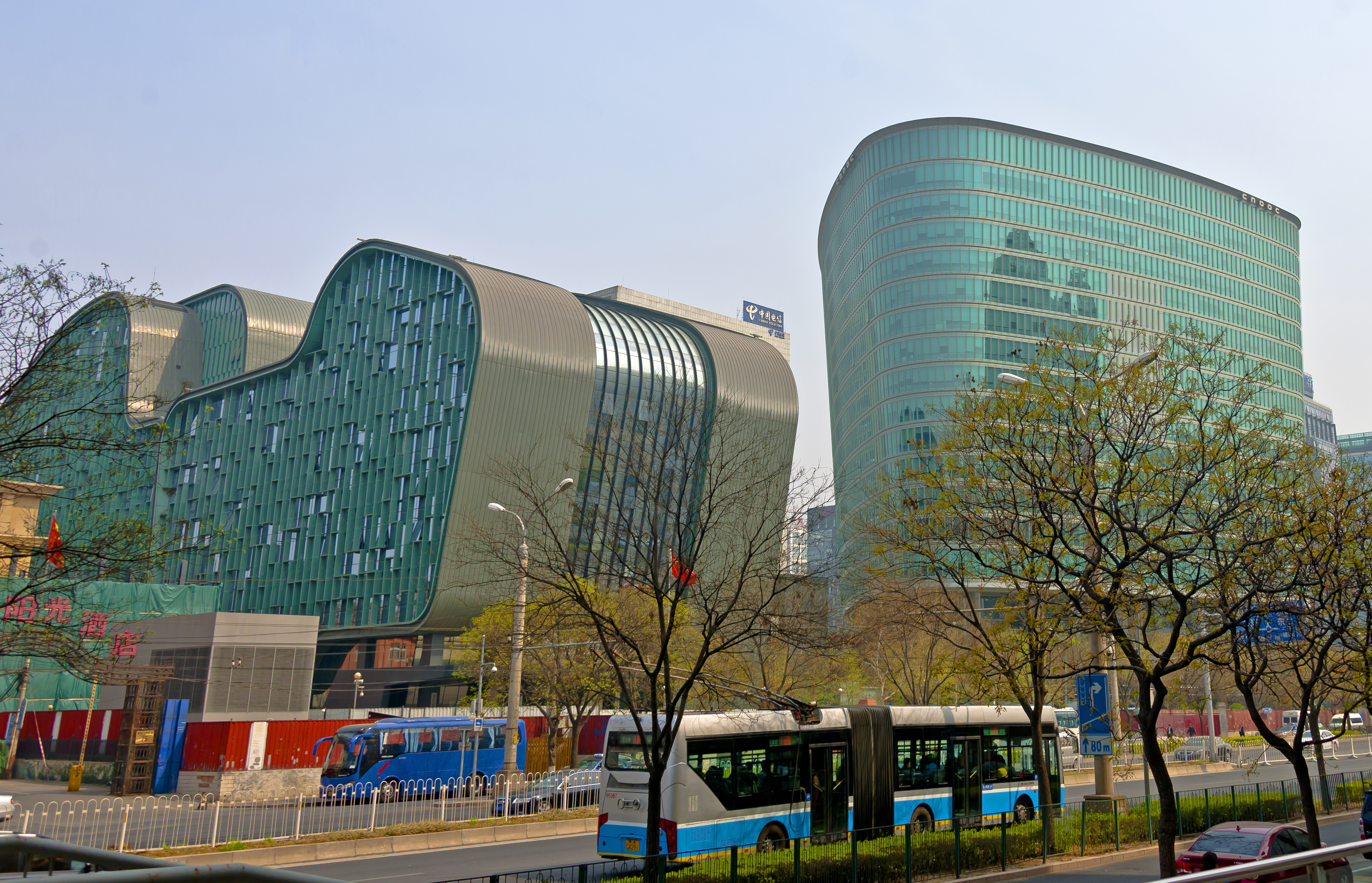
- The company headquarters in Beijing, which opened in 2006
- Native name: 中国海洋石油集团有限公司
- Romanized name: Zhōngguó Háiyáng Shíyóu Jítuán Yǒuxiàn Gōngsī
- Type: State-owned enterprise
- Industry: Oil and gas
- Founded: 1982; 44 years ago
- Headquarters: Beijing, China
- Number of locations: South China Sea, Bohai Sea
- Key people: Wang Yilin (Chairman); Huang Yongzhang (CEO)
- Revenue: 715,249,360,000 renminbi (2018)
- Number of employees: 21,993 (2024)
- Subsidiaries: CNOOC Limited; China Oilfield Services
- Website: www.cnooc.com.cn

China National Offshore Oil Corporation
- Simplified Chinese: 中国海洋石油集团有限公司
- Traditional Chinese: 中國海洋石油集團有限公司
Transcriptions
Standard Mandarin
- Hanyu Pinyin: Zhōngguó Háiyáng Shíyóu Jítuán Yǒuxiàn Gōngsī

Abbreviated as
- Simplified Chinese: 中国海油集团
- Traditional Chinese: 中國海油集團
Transcriptions
Standard Mandarin
- Hanyu Pinyin: Zhōngguó Háiyóu Jítuán

Further abbreviated as
- Simplified Chinese: 中海油集团
- Traditional Chinese: 中海油集團
Transcriptions
Standard Mandarin
- Hanyu Pinyin: Zhōng Háiyóu Jítuán

China National Offshore Oil Corporation, or CNOOC Group (Chinese: 中国海洋石油集团有限公司), is the third-largest national oil company in China, after CNPC (parent of PetroChina) and China Petrochemical Corporation (parent of Sinopec). The CNOOC Group focuses on the exploitation, exploration and development of crude oil and natural gas in offshore China, along with its subsidiary COOEC.

The company is owned by the government of the People's Republic of China, and the State-Owned Assets Supervision and Administration Commission of the State Council (SASAC) assumes shareholder rights and obligations on the government's behalf. One subsidiary, CNOOC Limited, is listed on the Hong Kong Stock Exchange; the other, China Oilfield Services, is listed on the Hong Kong and New York Stock Exchanges. In the 2020 Forbes Global 2000, CNOOC was ranked as the 126th largest public company in the world. In 2023, the company's seat in Forbes Global 2000 was 85.

== History ==
When the State Council implemented the regulation of the people's petroleum resources in cooperation with foreign enterprises on January 30, 1982, CNOOC was incorporated and authorized to assume overall responsibility for the exploitation of oil and gas resources of offshore China in cooperation with foreign partners, which ensured monopoly status for CNOOC in offshore oil and natural gas. With its headquarters in Beijing, CNOOC registered with capital of RMB 94.9 billion and has more than 98,750 employees.

In January 2012, one of CNOOC's offshore oilfield vessels capsized while it was under construction at a dock in east China. The $117 million ship was salvaged and did not cause any pollution according to CNOOC.

Following the 2022 Russian invasion of Ukraine the company continued doing business in Russia. For this reason Ukraine listed CNOOC as an International Sponsor of War.

=== Unocal buyout attempt ===
In June 2005, a CNOOC Group company (NYSE and Hong Kong-listed public company CNOOC limited) made an $18.5 billion cash offer for American oil company Unocal Corporation, topping an earlier bid by ChevronTexaco. Unocal's oil interests in Central Asia were considered a strategic fit for the company. On July 20, 2005, Unocal announced that it had accepted a buyout offer from ChevronTexaco for $17.1 billion, which was submitted to Unocal stockholders on August 10. On August 2 CNOOC Limited announced that it had withdrawn its bid, citing political tensions in the United States.

Despite a hands-off approach from the Bush administration, a group of Democrats and Republicans in Congress organized opposition to the CNOOC Limited bid. They argued that with $13 billion of CNOOC Limited's bid for Unocal coming from the Chinese government, the offer was not a free market transaction. American corporations were prohibited from purchasing assets in China, and it was also argued that foreign, communist ownership of oil assets might be a regional and economic-security risk; Unocal had sensitive deep-sea exploration and drilling technology. The Economist and other sources tried to discredit the security threat, and CNOOC was willing to undergo a US security review. Congressional delays and calls for inquiry deterred the CNOOC Limited bid.

The company was advised by Goldman Sachs. CNOOC Limited had a reputation for acting independently of the Chinese government, and had not notified government officials before bidding for UNOCAL. The political backlash in the United States caused the Chinese government to increase its oversight of Chinese companies, to avoid future risks to Sino-American relations.

CNOOC Limited faces challenges in the domestic market. Its rivals, CNPC and Sinopec, have been permitted to conduct offshore exploration once monopolized by CNOOC Limited. In accordance with the commitment by the Chinese government to join the World Trade Organization, the oil market will be opened to non-Chinese companies (such as ExxonMobil and BP) by the end of 2006. CNOOC Limited's smaller domestic competitors have been trying to break the monopoly of the three major NOCs in the industry.

In conjunction with 2009 failed deal between Aluminum Corporation of China and mining giant Rio Tinto, CNOOC's failed UNOCAL deal was perceived in China as part of a coordinated effort in the West to hinder China's economic growth.

=== Nexen acquisition ===
Adding 61 percent to Nexen's July 20, 2012 stock price, on July 23 CNOOC agreed to buy Nexen for $15.1 billion (China's largest foreign deal). The Canadian government's Investment Canada Act was used to determine if the sale was a "net benefit" to Canada. In addition to Canadian authorities, the acquisition had to be approved by the Committee on Foreign Investment in the United States. On 7 December the sale was approved by the Canadian government, and on February 12, 2013, it was approved by U.S. regulators.

=== 2014 onwards ===
In June 2014, CNOOC agreed a deal with BP worth around $20 billion that would see the latter supplying the former with liquefied natural gas. Also in June 2014, the company was developing a new project near the Weizhou Island Terminal, located about 80 nautical miles east of the Vietnamese border.

CNOOC had a net profit of $92.5 million in 2016, which was 97 percent lower than the previous year.

On June 5, 2018, CNOOC Gas and Power Group Co. Ltd., a subsidiary of China National Offshore Oil Corporation (CNOOC), China's largest LNG importer and terminal operator, has recently signed a memorandum of understanding (MOU) with the Philippine fuel retailer Phoenix Petroleum to study, plan, and develop a liquefied natural gas (LNG) receiving terminal project in the Philippines.

In September 2018, it also signed a memorandum of understanding with Nigerian National Petroleum Corporation on the production of biofuel.

In 2019, CNOOC was awarded the Theoretical Technology and Major Discoveries of Deep Large-scale Condensate Gas Field Exploration in the Bohai Bay Basin by the National Award for Science and Technology Progress, a state-level science and technology award established by the Chinese State Council.

In 2022 profits of CNOOC doubled to $20.6 billion from $10.2 billion in the previous year. There was an 8.9% increase in total oil and gas output.

In August 2023, CNOOC and Petrobras agreed on strategic cooperation in the areas of oil refining and chemical engineering, engineering and oil services, green and low-carbon energy, and crude oil trading. This will be in addition to the existing Brazilian assets of CNOOC — 7.34% of the shares in an integrated development project, the deepwater Buzios field, and 9.65% of the shares in the development of the Mero oil field.

In May 2023, CNOOC reported that a demonstration project of a deep-sea floating wind farm «Haiyou Guanlan», located near the Wenchang oil fields in the west of the South China Sea, 136 kilometers from the shore and 120 meters deep, fed electricity into the grid. With an installed capacity of 7.25 MW, the platform can produce up to 22 million kWh of electricity. This could save almost 10 million cubic metres of natural gas and reduce carbon dioxide emissions by 22,000 tons per year.

CNOOC Energy Holdings USA, a CNOOC subsidiary, was sold to INEOS in December 2024 for $2 billion.

== Operations ==
CNOOC operates in six business sectors: exploration and development of oil and gas; technical services; logistic; chemical and fertilizer production; natural gas and power generation, and financial services and insurance. In 2004, the company generated revenue of RMB70.92 billion, a net profit of RMB 24.22 billion and RMB 12.09 billion in taxes (up 32 percent, 62 percent and 80 percent, respectively, from the previous year). By the end of 2004 total and net assets had reached RMB153.26 billion and 83.06 billion, a 28- and 21-percent increase from the beginning of the year. The company is fifth and twelfth in gross profits and total assets of state-owned enterprises in China. Standard & Poor's and Moody's Investors Service assigned CNOOC a long-term BBB+ and A2, equivalent to China's government rating and the highest rating for a Chinese company.

The exploration and production of oil and gas grew steadily in 2004. Output reached 36.48 million tons of oil equivalent, increasing 3.12 million tons (nine percent) over 2003. Domestic production was 24.72 million tons, an 11-percent increase from the previous year and higher than the average national growth rate of three percent. The annual output in Bohai Bay exceeded 10 million tons of oil equivalent for the first time, making it the second offshore area producing over 10 million tons (after the Eastern South Sea) and an energy-production base in northern China.

CNOOC has established CNOOC Gas and Power, which focuses on gas distribution and power generation. CNOOC has become China's dominant producer of liquefied natural gas. The company signed all mid- and downstream contracts for the Guangdong and Fujian LNG projects and imported 3.5 million tons per annum (MPTA) and 2.6 MPTA of LNG, respectively, from Australia's North Western Shelf (NWS) and Indonesia's Tangguh fields (operated by BP). LNG projects in Zhejiang and Shanghai began construction, and CNOOC signed HOAs for LNG cooperation with Liaoning, Tianjin, Hebei, Hainan and Jiangsu. CNOOC has completed its preliminary strategic natural-gas deployment in southern coastal areas up to the Yangtze River. In these projects, CNOOC is responsible for constructing LNG receiving terminals and trunk lines for gas transmission and gas-fired power plants.

In April 2004, the Ministry of Commerce authorized CNOOC-SINOPEC United International Trading to import crude oil; CNPC, Sinopec, Sinochem and Zhuhai Zhenrong had been the only companies importing crude. In July the NDRC approved the Nanhai Refinery Project, a joint venture between CNOOC and Royal Dutch Shell and the largest joint venture ever in China (with an annual capacity of 12 million tons). CNOOC had an integrated industrial portfolio as it expanded into refining. Shell built a $4.3 billion JV ethylene plant, but announced in 2007 that it would not build a $2.4 billion refinery.

CNOOC Limited's share price rose by 37 percent in 2004, and its market capitalization reached RMB181.68 billion. CNOOC Engineering's share price on the Shanghai Stock Exchange rose by 66.11 percent, and the market capitalization of China Oilfield Services reached RMB10.1 billion. At the end of 2004 market capitalization of the three subsidiaries had approached RMB200 billion, 3.3 times their net assets. The company continued its operations in oil and gas exploration and development, exploitation of overseas resources, development of midstream and downstream business and modernization in 2005 with its goal an integrated, modern, competitive and profitable energy company by 2008.

Under ex-CEO Wei Liucheng (who was promoted to the governor of Hainan province in October 2003) and chairman and chief executive Fu Chengyu (傅成玉), CNOOC undertook a number of mergers and acquisitions. It acquired five blocks in Indonesia from Spanish oil company Repsol in 2002, becoming its largest offshore operator. In 2003, it bought 5.3 percent of the NWS, ensuring supplies for the Guangdong LNG project; that year, it also acquired 12.5 percent of Tangguh to ensure supply to the Fujian LNG project. CNOOC tried to acquire 12.5 percent of Australia's Gorgon field to ensure supply to the Shanghai and Zhejiang LNG projects, but the parties could not agree on a price.

According to SASAC, in December 2008 CNOOC made a light oil and gas discovery in the 100-million-ton class at its Jinzhou 25-1 field in Bohai Bay. In May 2009, the company announced plans for a $4.38 billion coal-based natural-gas project in Shanxi.

In 2010, CNOOC began to auction oil blocks in the Wushi oil field off Zhanjiang, a region yet unprospected with rich oil reserves.

In June 2021, production began at the second phase of the Weizhou 11-2 oilfield which is located in the Gulf of Tonkin. That same month, CNOOC's Deepwater gas field Lingshu 17-2 started production.

In April 2025, CNOOC signed an agreement with Abu Dhabi National Oil Corp (ADNOC) for 500,000 tonnes per day of LNG beginning in 2026 for a 5-year period.

In December 2025, production began at the Weizhou 11-4 Oilfield Adjustment and Satellite Fields Development Project. The CNOOC announced 15 upstream startups for 2025 in China, Guyana and Brazil.

On 23 March 2026, CNOOC announced that Huang Yongzhang was appointed Chief Executive Officer.

=== LNG terminals ===
CNOOC brought LNG to China with its Dapeng LNG Terminal in Guangdong, which received its first shipment (from the NWS LNG project in Australia) in July 2006.

Proposed CNOOC LNG terminals
Name	Location	Start date	Capacity (MTPA)	CNOOC share
Dapeng LNG	Guangdong	2006	3.7	33%
Putian LNG	Fujian	2007	2.6	60%
Yangshan LNG	Shanghai	2008	3.0	45%
Ningbo LNG	Zhejiang	2009	3.0	51%
Hainan LNG	Hainan	2009	3.0	65%
Qinhuangdao LNG	Hebei	2010	2.0	N/A
Binhai LNG	Jiangsu	2010–	3.0	N/A
Yingkou LNG	Liaoning	2010–	3.0	N/A
Zhuhai LNG	Guangdong	2010–	N/A	N/A

=== Operations in Africa ===
As of 2023, 2% of CNOOC's reserves are located in Africa and 5% of CNOOC's daily production comes from Africa. In Uganda, CNOOC has partnered with Total and Tullow Oil to develop the Lake Albert basin deposit, where CNOCC is also the operator. A CNOCC subsidiary owns part of multiple enterprises in Nigeria, and stakes in enterprises in Senegal, Republic of Congo, Algeria, and Gabon.

Also as of 2023, CNOCC has planned a liquified natural gas plant in Mozambique. CNOCC has a contract to buy much of the liquid natural to be produced at the plant.

== Controversy ==
=== Drug-trafficking ties ===
In October 2004, contract-sharing was negotiated in Burma by Myanmar Oil and Gas Enterprise, China Huanqiu Contracting and Engineering Corporation and CNOOC's Singaporean joint-venture partner, Golden Aaron. Golden Aaron is run by Cecilia Ng, wife of Steven Law; Law is the son of Lo Hsing Han, known as the "godfather of heroin". In 2008, the US Treasury intimated that CNOOC cooperates with a company run by a family known for heroin trafficking.

=== Human-rights abuses in Burma ===
In 2007, CNOOC was involved in a clash with Burmese workers who threw stones at the company offices. Ten workers from Kyaukphyu were detained and questioned by authorities after a dispute with CNOOC over low wages, long hours, reported underpayment and the mistreatment of inhabitants.

In 2008, CNOOC was accused of abuses of human rights in Burma. Arakan Oil Watch stated in a report that the company "left behind such a trail of abuses and environmental contamination on Ramree Island that outraged locals attacked their facilities". CNOOC's actions in Burma have been compared to that of communist officials in rural China, where entrepreneurs desiring development opposed by local residents steamroll their opposition. The Shwe gas project has been linked with land confiscation and human-rights abuses.

=== Forced displacement in Uganda ===
Allegations of displacement and other abuses of the local population were made against CNOOC relating to its Kingfisher project at Lake Albert (Uganda), where a central processing facility construction is taking place as part of the planned pipeline to Tanzania. The Kingfisher project is said to begin production in 2026.

=== Falun Gong persecution ===
CNOOC has been accused of participating in the persecution of Falun Gong by collaborating with the Chinese Communist Party to send Falun Gong CNOOC employees to labour camps and mind-control facilities, reducing their pay and preventing them from receiving benefits (or regular wages) unless they renounce their beliefs.

=== Bohai Bay oil spills ===
On June 4, 2011, the U.S. company ConocoPhillips, operating in the Penglai 19-3 oilfield, caused an oil spill from a seafloor leak which lasted until June 7. This was followed by a second leak on June 17, which was contained within 48 hours. The leaks polluted a total of more than 840 square kilometers of clean water in Bohai Bay. Fifty-one percent of the oilfield is owned by CNOOC, and forty-nine percent owned by ConocoPhillips. The first leak was not made public until July 5, 2011.

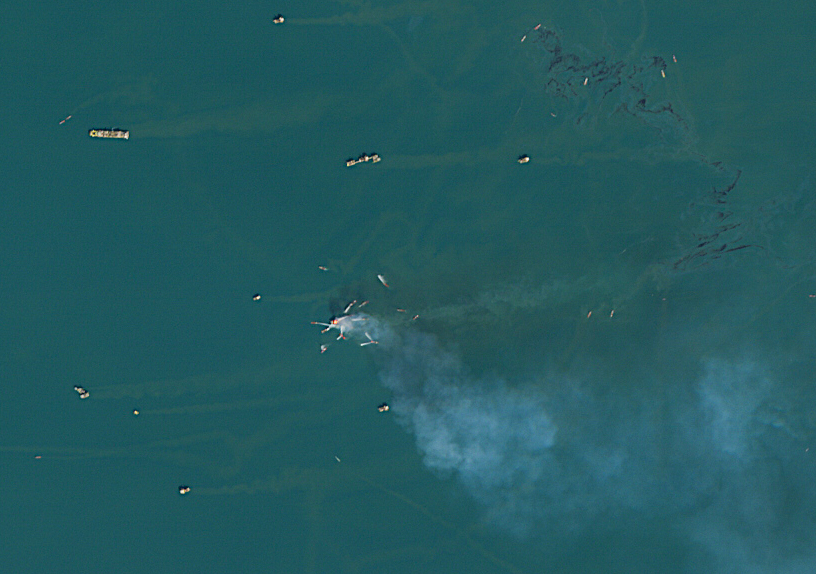
Fire and oil spill on April 6, 2021, as seen by the Sentinel-2 satellite

Another fire and oil spill is taking place since April 6, 2021, with workers missing.

=== Huizhou refinery explosion ===
On July 11, 2011, an explosion occurred at the Huizhou refinery in the Daya Bay Economic and Technical Development zone in Guangdong. The refinery is 40 kilometres (25 mi) from the Daya Bay Nuclear Power Plant.

=== U.S. sanctions ===
In December 2020, the United States Department of Defense named CNOOC as a company "owned or controlled" by the People's Liberation Army and thereby prohibited from receiving any American investment. In response to the executive order, in February 2021, NYSE commenced the process of delisting CNOOC.
