= Xu Gang (politician) =

Chinese official

Xu Gang 徐钢

Vice Governor of Fujian
- In office February 2013 – March 20, 2015

Communist Party Secretary of Quanzhou
- In office April 2008 – February 2013
- Preceded by: Zheng Daoxi (郑道溪)
- Succeeded by: Huang Shaoping

Personal details
- Born: December 1958 (age 67) Pucheng County, Fujian
- Party: Chinese Communist Party (1985–2015, expelled)
- Education: Fudan University
- Occupation: Politician

Xu Gang (Chinese: 徐钢; pinyin: Xú Gāng; born December 1958) is a former Chinese official who spent most of his career in Fujian province. He was the vice Governor of Fujian since 2013. On March 20, 2015, Xu Gang was placed under investigation by the Communist Party's anti-corruption agency. He was the first high-ranking politician being examined from Fujian province after the 18th Party Congress in 2012. In 2016, Xu was sentenced to 13 years in prison.

== Career ==
Xu Gang was born in Pucheng County, Fujian. In 1978, Xu Gang attended Fudan University and graduated in 1982. In 1997, he became vice-mayor of Putian until September 2000. In 2003, Xu became the director of Department of Transportation of Fujian. In 2005, he became the director of Economic and Trade Commission of Fujian. Xu Gang became the Communist Party Secretary of Quanzhou from April 2008 to February 2013. In February 2013, Xu Gang became the Vice Governor of Fujian. He managed personnel, labor and social security, work safety, food and drug safety, emergency management, petition and efficiency etc.

On March 20, 2015, Xu Gang was placed under investigation by the Central Commission for Discipline Inspection of the Chinese Communist Party for "serious violations of laws and regulations". Xu was expelled from the Chinese Communist Party on July 27, 2015.

On December 29, 2016, Xu was sentenced to 13 years in prison for bribery.
