= CNOOC Limited =

Chinese oil and gas company, Hong Kong-based subsidiary of CNOOC

- Native name: 中國海洋石油有限公司
- Type: Public (mostly state-owned)
- Traded as: SSE: 600938; SEHK: 883; HSI component; S&P Asia 50 component
- Industry: Oil and gas
- Founded: August 1999; 27 years ago
- Headquarters: Hong Kong, China (registered office); Beijing (de facto)
- Key people: Zhang Chuanjiang (Chairman); Huang Yongzhang; (President & CEO)
- Production output: 777.3 million barrels of oil equivalent (4.755×10^{9} GJ) (2025)
- Revenue: ▼CN¥398.220 billion (2025)
- Net income: ▼CN¥122.148 billion (2025)
- Total assets: ▲CN¥1,098.559 billion (2025)
- Total equity: ▲CN¥805.184 billion (2025)
- Number of employees: 23,084 (2025)
- Parent: China National Offshore Oil Corporation
- Subsidiaries: CNOOC Petroleum North America
- Website: cnoocltd.com

CNOOC Limited
- Simplified Chinese: 中国海洋石油有限公司
- Traditional Chinese: 中國海洋石油有限公司
Transcriptions
Standard Mandarin
- Hanyu Pinyin: Zhōngguó Hǎiyáng Shíyóu Yǒuxiàn Gōngsī

Abbreviated as
- Chinese: 中海油
Transcriptions
Standard Mandarin
- Hanyu Pinyin: Zhōng Háiyóu

CNOOC Limited (中国海洋石油有限公司; 中國海洋石油有限公司) is China's largest producer of offshore crude oil and natural gas, noted as such in 2010. It is a major subsidiary of China National Offshore Oil Corporation (CNOOC) and has been listed on the Hong Kong SEHK: 883 since February 2001. It was listed on the New York Stock Exchange from 2001 to 2021. It was listed on the Toronto Stock Exchange between 2013 (following its acquisition of Nexen Inc) and 2021. It was admitted as a constituent stock of the Hang Seng Index in July 2001.

== History ==
China National Offshore Oil Corporation or CNOOC, is a state-owned enterprise based in Beijing, capital of China. In order to float most of its assets on the Hong Kong stock exchange, a special purpose vehicle was incorporated in Hong Kong as an intermediate holding company, in order to transfer the control of some subsidiaries to the company. Thus, it was considered as a red chip company of the exchange, due to its government background but incorporated outside mainland China. As of 31 March 2020, the company had a market capitalization of HK$363 billion.

In October 2024, CNOOC signed an Exploration, Development & Production Contract (EDPC) with Midland Oil Company, an Iraqi state-run oil company.

== Operations ==
Its core domestic operation areas are in Bohai, the South China Sea, and the East China Sea. Internationally, it has oil and gas assets in Asia, Africa, North America, South America, and Oceania.

As of December 31, 2011, the CNOOC Limited owned net proven reserves of approximately 3.19 billion barrel of oil equivalent (BOE), and its average daily net production was 909,000 BOE.

=== Competition in China ===
CNOOC Ltd's parent, China National Offshore Oil Corporation (CNOOC), is the third largest of the "Big Three" Chinese oil companies, and traditionally specialised in offshore upstream exploration and production, whereas CNPC Group specialised in onshore upstream exploration and production, and Sinopec Group specialised in refining and marketing. These distinctions are now increasingly blurred as the three companies compete in all areas. All of the "Big Three" have vested the majority of revenue producing assets in listed Hong Kong subsidiaries. CNPC into PetroChina, Sinopec Group into Sinopec Limited, and CNOOC Group into CNOOC Limited.

Through COOEC and other state owned entities, CNOOC owns and operates a number of offshore vessels, including six large crane barges, namely "HYSY 202", "HYSY201", "Lanjing", "Blue Xinjiang", "Binhai 109", "HYSY286", "HYSY289" and "HYSY291".

== See also ==
- China National Offshore Oil Corporation (CNOOC)
- Petroleum industry in China
