= Mineral industry of São Tomé and Príncipe =

The mineral industry does not play a significant role in the economy of São Tomé and Príncipe.

== Production ==
Mineral production was limited to clay and volcanic rock; potential exists, however, for the development of the country's petroleum industry. All other mineral product requirements were imported.

== Commodities ==
=== Petroleum ===
Indications of the existence of hydrocarbons in São Tomé and Príncipe were first noted in 1974, but attempts by the Portuguese Colonial Administration to sign a concession agreement with Ball & Collins North Sea consortium (a predecessor of Premier Oil of the United Kingdom) were abandoned following the country's declaration of independence in 1975. Other attempts to start petroleum exploration during the late 1980s and 1990s also failed. In 2003, Nigeria (60%) and São Tomé and Príncipe (40%) agreed to jointly operate an overlapping maritime boundary located about 200 km offshore Nigeria known as the Joint Development Zone (JDZ). Activities in the JDZ were to be overseen by the Joint Development Authority (JDADA). The JDZ was divided into nine blocks, and a licensing round was opened for bids in 2004, which resulted in the award of Block 1 to a consortium made up of Chevron Corporation of the United States (51%), Esso Exploration and Production Nigeria-Sao Tome (One) Ltd. (40%), and Dangote Energy Equity Resources Ltd. (a joint-venture of the Dangote Group of Nigeria and Energy Equity Resources AS of Norway) (9%). The consortium signed a production-sharing agreement with the JDADA in 2005 and, in January 2006, began drilling activities within the block. In May 2006, the consortium announced that it had encountered hydrocarbons in the Obo-1 exploration well in Block 1 and that it was in the process of evaluating reservoir rock and liquid samples to determine the next step of the appraisal process. Block 1 is located about 300 km north of São Tomé and Príncipe and about 200 km south of the city of Port Harcourt in Nigeria.

A second licensing round for Blocks 2 through 6 was opened for bids in 2005. Energy Inc. of the United States (ERHC) won the rights to these blocks and, in March 2006, the company signed a series of production-sharing agreements with the JDADA and several petroleum and gas companies, among which were Addax Energy Nigeria Limited, Addax Petroleum (Nigeria offshore 2) Limited, Addax Petroleum Resources Nigeria Limited, Sinopec International Petroleum Exploration and Production Corporation Nigeria, and several other petroleum and gas companies whose names were not disclosed. Following inquires by the Petroleum Affairs Commission, the National Petroleum Council recognized deficiencies in the awarding process and ordered a formal investigation. The Attorney General, after concluding that the procedures used in selecting petroleum companies was flawed, recommended a restructuring of the procedures for future bidding rounds that would conform to international standards. The Attorney General's report also called for the reexamination of ERHC's preferential rights for Blocks 2, 3, 4, 5, and 6 within the JDZ. Since 2006, there has been no word on any of the reexamination of ERHC's preferential rights and the countries of Sao Tome and Nigeria are moving forward with the exploration of the JDZ for oil. In or about July 2009 there are scheduled two oil rigs to start exploration and drilling of petroleum reserves within blocks 2-4 and ERHC is predominant in these blocks. With the possible acquisition of Addax Petroleum by Sinopec, and with the reports of Sinopec looking into acquiring ERHC, it is looking more like Sinopec will be the mainstay of the JDZ for Sao Tome and Nigeria in this area.
