= Yu Baocai =

- 喻宝才

President of the China Petrochemical Corporation
- In office November 2021 – April 2024
- Preceded by: Ma Yongsheng
- Succeeded by: Zhao Dong

Personal details
- Born: January 1965 (age 61) Ningxiang County, Hunan, China
- Party: Chinese Communist Party
- Education: Harbin Institute of Technology

Chinese name
- Simplified Chinese: 喻宝才
- Traditional Chinese: 喻寶才
Transcriptions
Standard Mandarin
- Hanyu Pinyin: Yù Bǎocái

Yu Baocai (Chinese: 喻宝才; born January 1965) is a Chinese executive who served as president of the China Petrochemical Corporation between 2021 and 2024.

== Early life and education ==
Yu was born in Ningxiang County (now Ningxiang), Hunan, in January 1965. In 1987, he graduated from Harbin Institute of Technology, where he majored in political economics.

== Career ==
After University in 1987, Yu was assigned to the Daqing Petrochemical Plant. There, he was in turn a technician, an assistant engineer, a deputy director, deputy factory director of the Chemical Fiber Plant, factory director of the Acrylic Factory, and finally deputy general manager and deputy party secretary.

In September 2003, Yu was transferred to the Lanzhou Petrochemical Company and appointed deputy party secretary and general manager.

Yu was deputy general manager of the China National Petroleum Corporation in September 2008 and became a director in May 2011.

Yu was chosen as deputy general manager of the China Petrochemical Corporation in July 2018, and rose to become president in November 2021. His assignment ended in April 2024. He still stayed at the company and serves as a senior vice president.

Business positions
| Preceded by Ma Yongsheng | President of the China Petrochemical Corporation; 2021–2024 | Succeeded by Zhao Dong |
