= Liao Yongyuan =

Chinese business executive

Liao Yongyuan 廖永远
- Born: 1962 (age 63–64); Songzi, Hubei
- Education: Jianghan Petroleum University; China University of Petroleum
- Occupation: President of China National Petroleum Corporation
- Years active: 1985–2015
- Political party: Chinese Communist Party (expelled)

Liao Yongyuan (Chinese: 廖永远; pinyin: Liào Yǒngyuǎn; born 1962) is a former Chinese business executive. He was the president of China National Petroleum Corporation (CNPC), which is the oil giant of China. Liao is also nicknamed "Northwest Tiger" (西北虎). On March 15, 2015, Liao Yongyuan was placed under investigation by the Communist Party's anti-corruption agency.

== Career ==
Liao Yongyuan was born in Songzi, Hubei in 1962. He graduated from Jianghan Petroleum University (now Yangtze University) and China University of Petroleum. In 1999, Liao became the general manager of Tarim Oilfield (塔里木油田). He became the assistant to the general manager of the CNPC in 2004 and he became the vice-president of CNPC in 2007. In 2013, Liao Yongyuan became the president of CNPC.

On March 15, 2015, Liao Yongyuan was placed under investigation by the Central Commission for Discipline Inspection of the Chinese Communist Party for "serious violations of laws and regulations". He was expelled from the Communist Party on June 15, 2015. On January 19, 2017, he was sentenced to 15 years, and fined 1.5 million yuan.
