= Chemical industry in China =

Major manufacturing industry in China

The chemical industry in the People's Republic of China valued at around $1.75 trillion in 2014. The country is currently the largest chemicals manufacturer in the world.

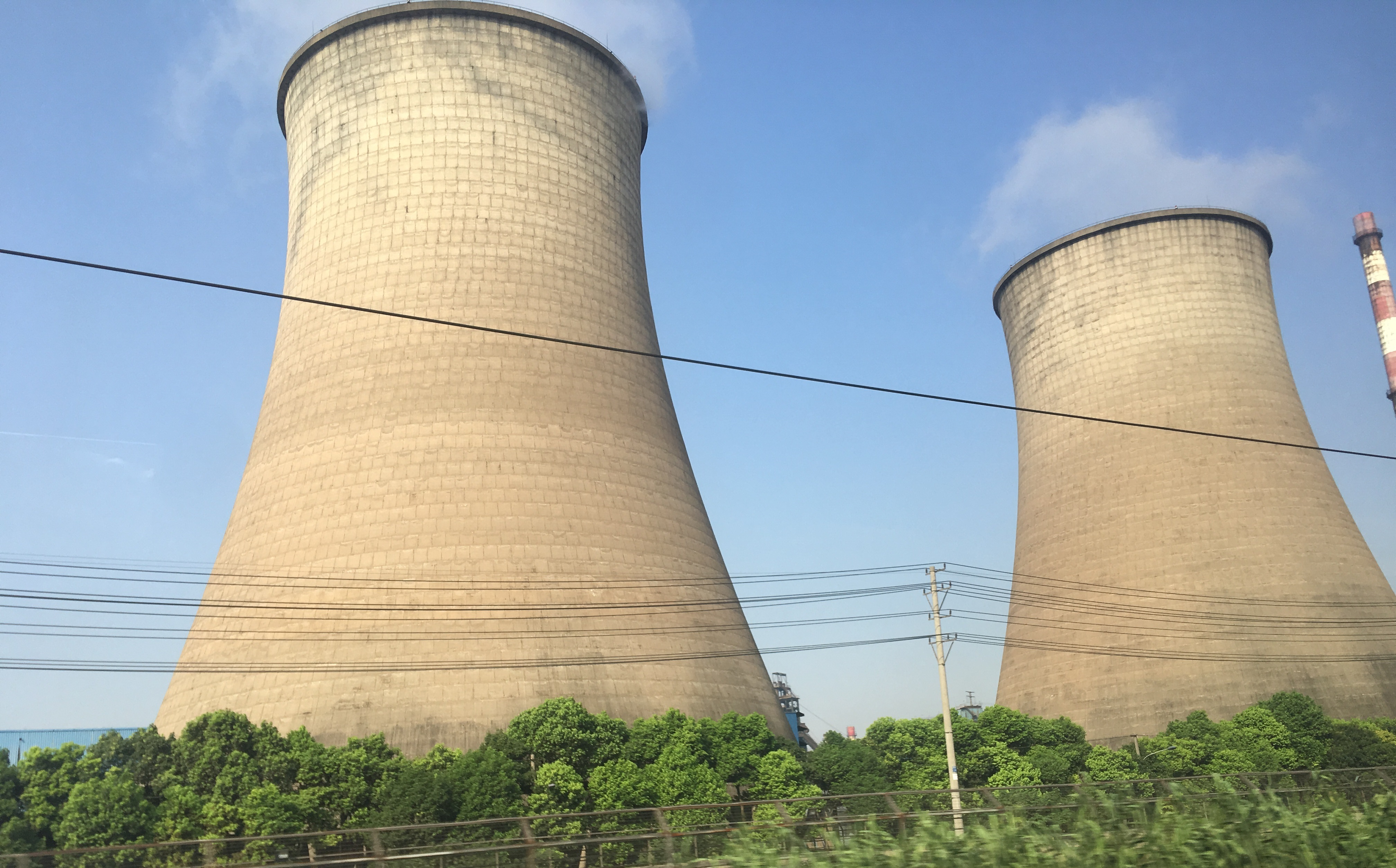

The chemical industry is central to modern China's economy. It uses special methods to alter the structure, composition or synthesis of substances to produce new products, such as steel, plastic, and ethyl. The chemical industry provides building materials for China's infrastructure, including subway, high-speed train, and highway.

Prior to 1978, most of the products were produced by the state-owned enterprises, but the share in product output from state-owned business has since decreased.

The Chinese chemical industry is also one of the world's largest producers of both controlled and non-controlled precursor chemicals used in the Global illicit drug trade, particularly in the Golden Triangle, Mexico, Latin America and Europe, with large volumes of these substances being traded through the growing research chemical (RC) industry online through social media and on B2B platforms and the dark web.

== History ==
The modern chemical industry was born after the Industrial Revolution which took place in 1760 to sometime between 1820 and 1840. This revolution included the change from hand production methods to machines, iron production processes and new chemical manufacturing. Before that, China's chemical products were mainly produced by hand workshop.

=== Medical chemistry ===
Tu Youyou
- 屠呦呦
- Born: December 30, 1930 (age 95); Zhejiang, China
- Known for: Discover qinghaosu
- Awards: 2015 Nobel Prize in Physiology or Medicine
- Scientific career
- Fields: Medical chemistry

Shennong has tested hundreds of herbs to find their medical value, and have written "The Divine Farmer's Herb-Root Classic". This book recorded the efficacy of 365 medicines derived from plants, animals, and minerals and gave rarity ratings and grade. Shennong's work led the way to Chinese medicine. In the Ming Dynasty, Li Shizhen wrote "Compendium of Materia Medica" which contained more than 1,800 kinds of drugs. It also described the nature, flavor, form, type and usage in disease cure of over 1000 herbs. The book is considered as the primary reference work for herbal preparation. These works were significant to the development of traditional Chinese medicine, and they laid the foundation for modern Chinese medical chemistry.

Tu Youyou is a pharmaceutical chemist of China. She discovered qinghaosu (artemisinin) and applied to cure malaria. Qinghaosu saves millions of lives in South China, South America, Southeast Asia, and Africa. It is an important breakthrough in the medicine area last century, and Tu Youyou received the 2015 Nobel Prize in Physiology or Medicine and Lasker Award in Clinical Medicine for her work. She is the first Chinese female to receive a Nobel Prize in Physiology or Medicine.

=== Agriculture chemistry ===
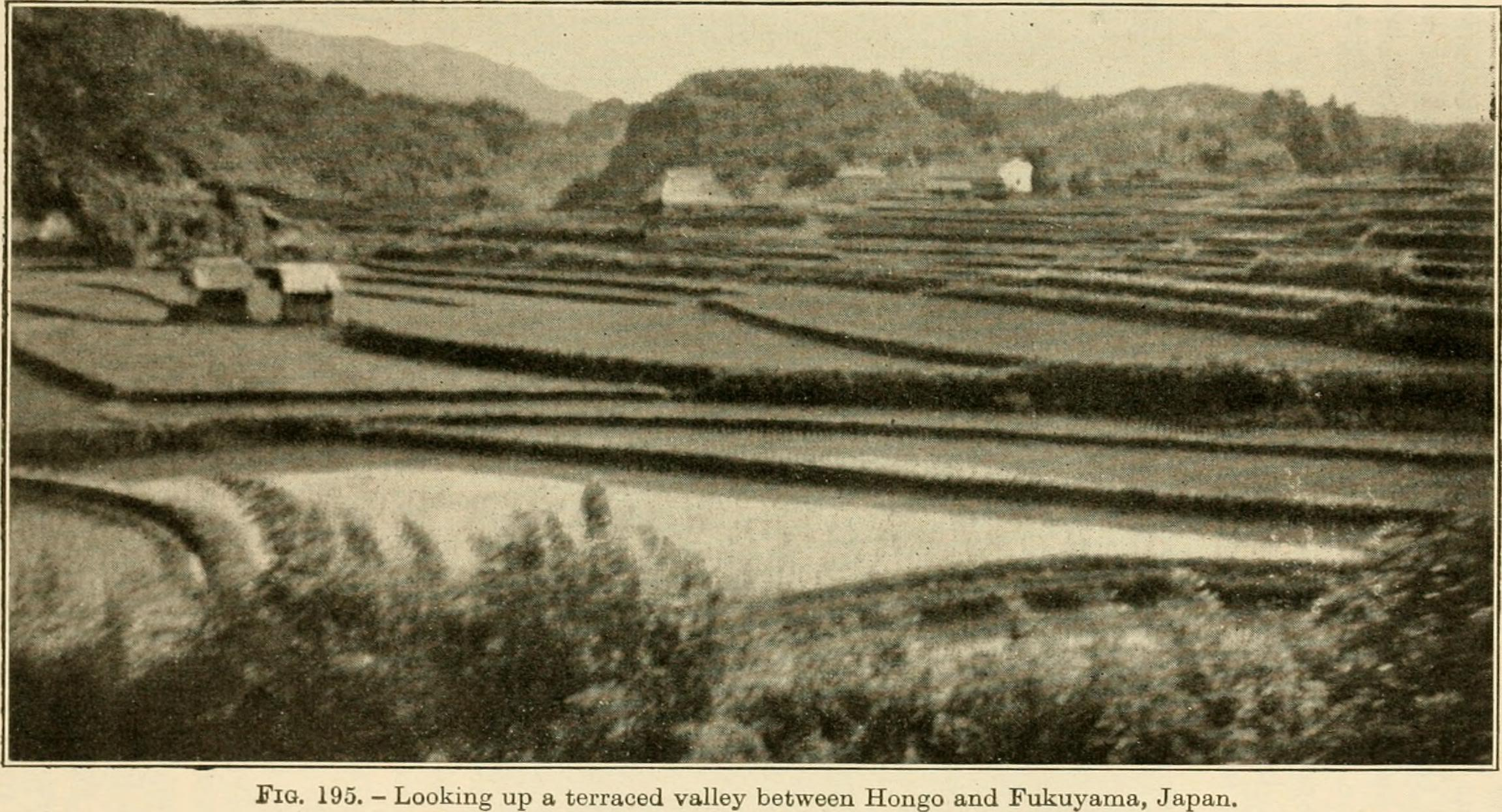

China's agriculture production efficiency boosted in the 20th century, because of the application of chemical pesticides and fertilizers. In 1909, Franklin Hiram King, US Professor of Agriculture, made a tour of China. His book "Farmers of Forty Centuries" described China's farming. This book inspired many Chinese farmers to conduct ecological farming and use fertilizers. Beginning in 1978, the Chinese government created the Family Production Responsibility System and encouraged farmers to use fertilizer.

Chemical fertilizer can increase the output by 50% to 80%. The chemical industry produces micronutrients fertilizer contained nitrogen, phosphorus and potassium, which can meet the demand of different crops and soil structure. China is currently the largest consumer and producer of nitrogen fertilizers.

== Chemical material ==
According to statistics, by 1984, there were actually about 9 million chemical substances in the world, of which about 43% were materials. Although the number of materials is large, if classified according to chemical composition, it can be summarized into three categories: metal materials, inorganic non-metal materials and composite materials.

=== Metal ===
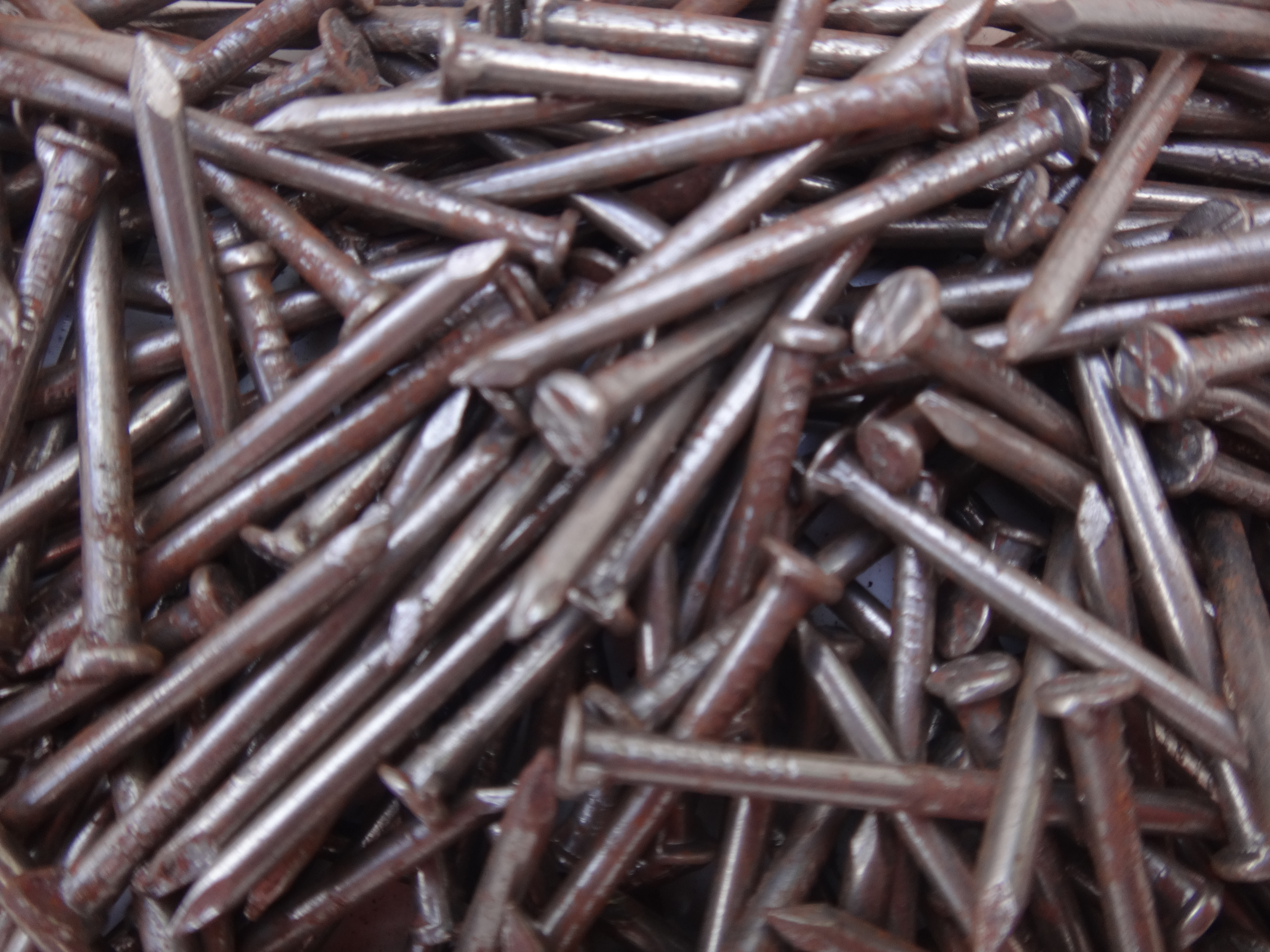

Steel is an important metal material in the chemical industry of China. In 2016, the annual production of steel of the world is 1621 million tons, of which 804 million tons are produced in China (49.6%), 105 million tons are produced in Japan (6.5%), 89 million tons are produced in India (5.5%), 79 million tons are produced in US (4.9%).

China's production of steel increased from 100 million tons in 2000 to 250 million tons in 2004. It caused rising demand for raw materials which is necessary for steel production, included pig iron, iron ore, scrap metal, lime and dolomite, coke and coal. The price of iron ore increased by over 70% from 2004 to 2005. Thus, in December 2005, China decided to limit production of steel to not more than 400 million tons per year within five years, in order to lower the increasing rate of raw material prices.

=== Non-metal ===
In 2016, China ethyl alcohol and other basic organic chemicals markets and plastic materials and resins market were valued at $137 and $184 billion respectively, which had 9% and 10% growth rates.

China is the largest producer and exporter plastic materials market in the world. The main driver of this market is the expanded application of ethanol in China. The demand for ethanol in China is about 2.3 million tons now.

China has a key operating division, Chenguang Institute, which has developed a number of advanced epoxy resin, organic silicone, polymer material and specialty engineering plastics. It has signed a JV agreement with DuPont's high-performance polymer division, to produce and sale premixed rubber and raw fluoro-rubber. The JV agreement included the establishment of an ultra-modern pre-mixed rubber factory in Shanghai and it began to operate in 2011.

=== Composite material ===
The composite material is new structural material. It is characterized by a combination of volumetric strength, volumetric stiffness and corrosion resistance over metallic materials. It is composed of a matrix material such as synthetic resin, metal or ceramic, and a reinforcing material composed of inorganic or organic synthetic fibres. There are a variety of substrates and reinforcing materials so that a selective fit can be made to produce various composites with satisfactory performance, which has a broader prospect for chemical materials.

Sinochem and Shanghai Chemical Industry Institute have set up a laboratory for composite materials. The two sides will jointly develop technology, transform the results and apply in the industry of carbon fiber and its curing resins, in order to promote the technologies and products of high-performance composite materials and facilitate its industrialization and marketization. At present, this laboratory has launched a project to research and develop the spray-free carbon fiber composite material. At first, this material will be applied to new energy cars, which can not only reduce the weight of the cars but also reduce the cost of applying composite materials while improving production efficiency significantly.

== Companies ==
China has a company which is the top 3 chemical companies all over the world. That is Sinopec. It has $43.8 billion in chemical sales in 2015.

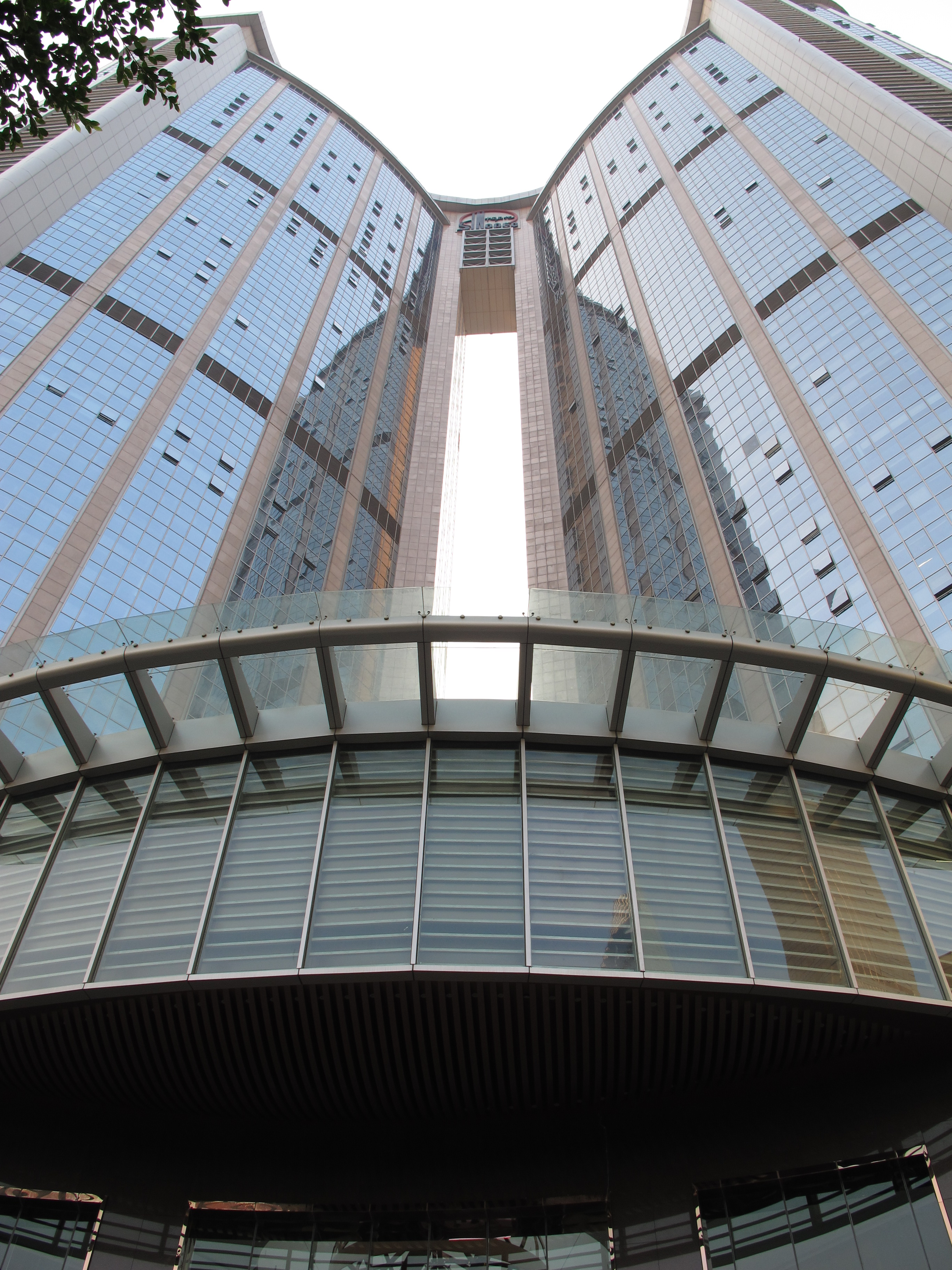
Sinopec Building

A list of the top 20 China's chemical corporation by turnover in 2018 shows below.

No.	Companies
1	SINOPEC
2	China National Petroleum Corporation
3	China National Offshore Oil Corporation
4	China Zhonghua Group co. LTD
5	China National Chemical Corporation
6	Shaanxi Yanchang Petroleum co. LTD
7	Henan Energy Chemical Group co. LTD
8	China Pingmei what energy chemical industry group limited liability company
9	Zhejiang Rongsheng Holding group co. LTD
10	Zhejiang Hengyi Group co. LTD
11	Shandong Dongming Petrochemical Group co. LTD
12	Wanda Holding group co. LTD
13	Lihua Yi group co. LTD
14	Jiangyin Chengxing Industrial Group co. LTD
15	Yuntianhua Group co. LTD
16	Shanghai Huayi company
17	China Chemical Engineering co. LTD
18	Yangquan Coal Chemical Industry Group co. LTD
19	Shandong Jingbo Holding co. LTD
20	Shandong Haike Chemical Group co. LTD

Chinese companies plan to go into the specialties side of the market, and some of them already become one of the players in the market, such as Zhejiang NHU, a vitamin maker; Yantai Wanhua, an isocyanates maker; and Bairun, the leader in the Chinese flavors-and-fragrances market.

== Development tendency ==
=== Overview ===
The chemical market value of China had increased in the past 30 years. In 2015, it represented about 30% of the chemicals demand all over the world.

China's demand growth of the chemical industry has slowed down from the two-digit rates in the past 10 years, but it still has 60% growth for the global demand from 2011 to 2020.

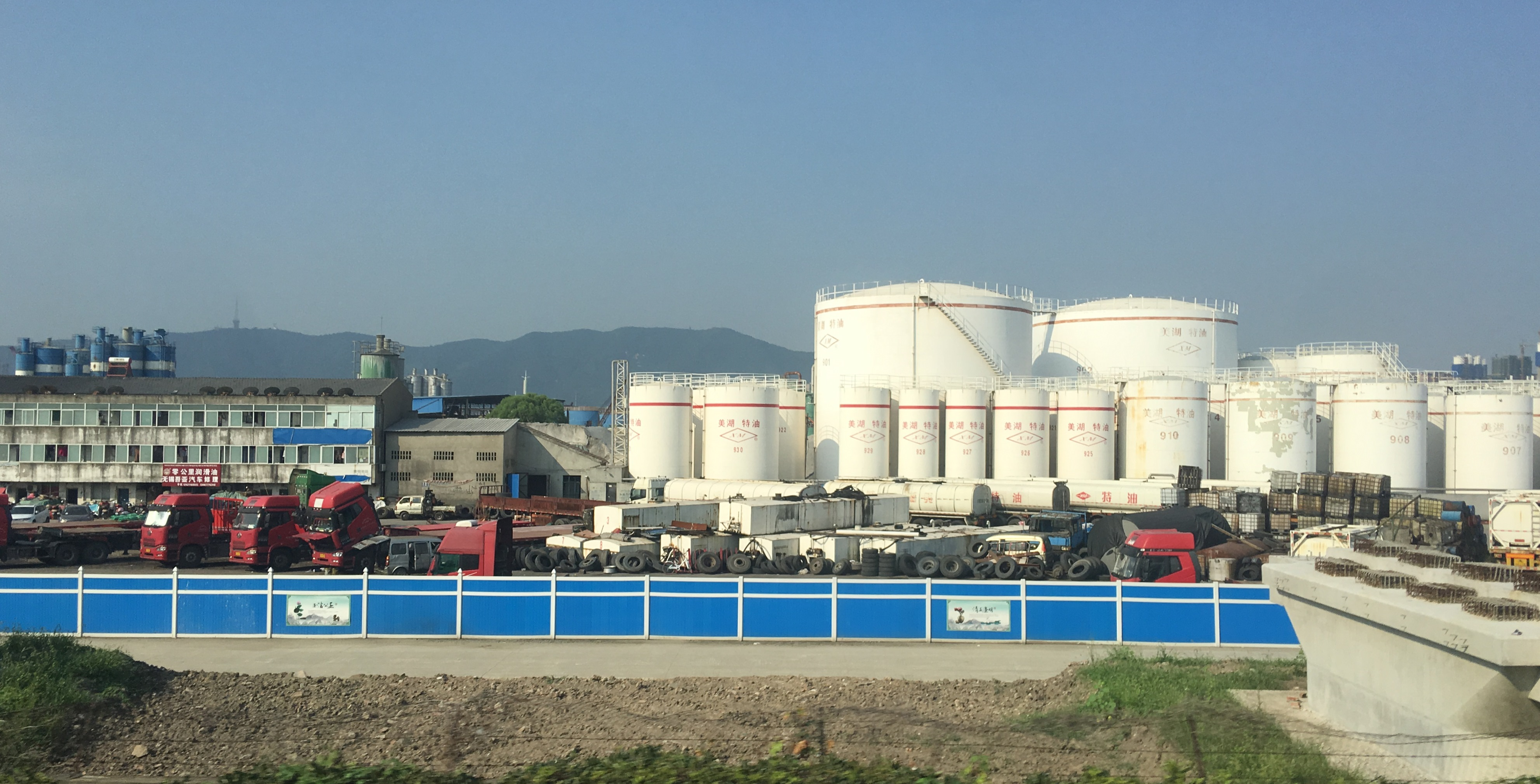

As of the end of November 2011, there were 24,125 enterprises above designated size in the China national chemical industry, with a total output value of 6.0 trillion yuan, a year-on-year increase of 35.2%, accounting for 58.61% of the total output value of the whole industry. In the first 11 months of 2011, the fixed assets investment in the chemical industry was 861.721 billion yuan, a year-on-year increase of 26.9%, which was 5.5 percentage points higher than the industry average, accounting for 70.12%. In the first 10 months of 2011, the total profit of the chemical industry was 320.88 billion yuan, a year-on-year increase of 44.4%, accounting for 47.1% of the total industry profits. The annual output value of the chemical industry is expected to be about 6.58 trillion yuan, a year-on-year increase of 32%, and the total profit is 350 billion yuan, an increase of 35%. In 2011, the added value of the chemical industry increased by 14.8% year-on-year, and the growth rate slowed by 1% year-on-year.

A list of China chemical industry's main products in 2011 shows below.

Products	Output (million tons)	Increase rate
Ethylene	15.28	7.40%
Plastics	47.98	9.30%
Synthetic rubber	3.49	13.10%
Synthetic fibers	30.96	13.90%
Caustic soda	24.66	15.20%
Soda ash	22.03	13.40%
Synthetic fertilizer	60.27	12.10%
Pesticide	2.65	21.40%
Calcium carbide	17.38	22.30%

=== Government policy goals ===
China government set up policy goals to solve the unemployment issue and boost the economy, in order to against the increasing population. The government's policies and goals have progressed as the economy was opened up in 1978. It can be divided into three periods:

1978-1990: China's market was opened to the world in 1978, and the government knew the importance of the chemical industry, so permitted the foreign direct investment get into domestic but control heavily. Meanwhile, China's domestic chemical demand increased, so most companies decided to invest in produce.

1990-2000: Multinationals were allowed to enter the Chinese market, to join the chemical produce cooperate with Chinese firms.

2000-2011: Foreign direct investment in this period has not to limit, while multinationals booming because China became a major exporter for chemical in the world.

=== Environmental pollution ===
China's chemical industry has developed over the past 40 years, from an economic backwater to the largest chemicals manufacturing economy, that consumes raw materials and energy. This change has helped hundreds of millions of Chinese out of poverty but polluted China's air and water at the same time.

China government has made efforts to fight the pollution. Free plastic shopping bags were banned in 2008. The production of plastic bags causes a waste of resource and energy and environmental pollution because plastic bags are non-recyclable.

Chemical industries in China are starting to research and develop green technologies by the recommendation of the government such as the use of alternative fuels to produce chemical products. Some industries are using carbon dioxide and others naturally available to produce industrial products, fuels and other substances. For example, a specialty chemicals company called Elevance Renewable Sciences produces highly concentrated detergents by using green technology metathesis, which significantly lowers the energy consumption and minimizes pollution.

=== Illicit substances ===
China’s chemical industry is one of the world's largest producers of both controlled and non-controlled precursor chemicals used in the global illicit drug trade. These chemicals can be found utilized in drug industries located in the Golden Triangle, Mexico, Latin America and Europe.

Laos is the key route into the Golden Triangle for precursors from China, and finished products from the region have been seized across the region and beyond. Numerous seizures of precursors from China have occurred in recent years, including one disclosed in 2021 in which Lao authorities seized 200 tons of precursors including 72 tons of propionyl chloride from China. The chemicals had been transported to Bokeo, Laos, which is a key gateway to Myanmar drug factories, especially via the Golden Triangle Special Economic Zone area. Commenting on the seizure, a Lao official told Voice of America: “You can only imagine the amount of drugs that volume of precursors can make.”

== See also ==
- Chemical industry
- Chemical engineering
- Industry of China
