= Xifeng oil field =

Mongolian oil field

Xifeng
- Country: China
- Region: Inner Mongolia
- Offshore/onshore: onshore
- Operator: China National Petroleum Corporation

Field history
- Discovery: 2002
- Start of production: 2006

Production
- Estimated oil in place: 568 million tonnes (~ 672.7×10^{6} m^{3} or 4231 million bbl)

The Xifeng oil field is an oil field located in Inner Mongolia. It was discovered in 2002 and developed by China National Petroleum Corporation. It began production in 2006 and produces oil. The total proven reserves of the Xifeng oil field are around 4.23 billion barrels (568 million tonnes), and production is centered on 22,000 barrels per day (3,500 m^{3}/d).
