= Yuanba gas field =

Natural gas field in Sichuan, China

Yuanba
- Country: China
- Region: Sichuan
- Offshore/onshore: onshore
- Operator: Sinopec

Field history
- Discovery: 2011
- Start of production: 2015

Production
- Current production of gas: 9.3×10^{6} m^{3}/d 325.5×10^{6} cu ft/d 3.4×10^{9} m^{3}/a (120×10^{9} cu ft/a)
- Estimated gas in place: 160×10^{9} m^{3} 5.6×10^{12} cu ft

The Yuanba gas field is a natural gas field located in Sichuan, China. Discovered in 2011, it was developed by Sinopec, determining it to have initial total proven reserves of around 5.6 trillion ft^{3} (160 km^{3}). It will begin production of natural gas and condensates in 2015, with a production rate of around 325.5 million ft^{3}/day (9.3×10^{5} m^{3}).
