= Dazhou gas field =

Natural gas field in Sichuan, China

Dazhou
- Country: China
- Region: Sichuan
- Offshore/onshore: onshore
- Operator: China National Petroleum Corporation

Field history
- Discovery: 2005
- Start of production: 2006

Production
- Current production of gas: 54.8×10^{6} m^{3}/d 1.9×10^{9} cu ft/d 20×10^{9} m^{3}/a (710×10^{9} cu ft/a)
- Estimated gas in place: 3.8×10^{12} m^{3} 134.9×10^{12} cu ft

The Dazhou gas field is a natural gas field located in Sichuan, China. Discovered in 2005, it was developed by the China National Petroleum Corporation, determining it to have initial total proven reserves of around 134.9 trillion ft^{3} (3800 km^{3}). It began production of natural gas and condensates in 2006, with a production rate of around 1.9 billion ft^{3}/day (54.8×10^{5} m^{3}).
