= Emeka Offor =

Nigerian oil magnate and entrepreneur (born 1959)

Sir Emeka Offor
- Born: February 10, 1959 (age 67); Nigeria
- Occupation: Business magnate
- Organization: The Sir Emeka Offor Foundation (SEOFen)

Emeka Offor (born 10 February 1959) is a Nigerian oil magnate, philanthropist and entrepreneur. He is the former chairman of Erhc Energy Inc, the CEO of Chrome Group, one of West Africa's leading oil and gas conglomerate, and founder of the Sir Emeka Offor Foundation.

== Background ==
Offor hails from Irefi Oraifite in Ekwusigo Local Government area of Anambra State, Nigeria. Offor had his primary education at Eziukwu Primary School in Aba, Abia State, and St. Michael's Primary School at Ogbete, Enugu. On completing his primary education, he began his secondary education at Merchant of Light School, and subsequently moved to Abbot Boys High School, Ihiala, Anambra State. He is a Knight of Saint Christopher in the Church of Nigeria, and one of the premier Knights in Oraifite, Anambra State.

== Philanthropy ==
He created the Sir Emeka Offorr Foundation (SEOF) "to help people in need to become independent and self-sufficient".
