= Henan oil field =

Oil field in Nanyang, Henan, China

- Location within China
- Country: China
- Region: Henan
- Location: Nanyang
- Offshore/onshore: Onshore
- Coordinates: 32°40′57″N 112°37′18″E
- Operators: SINOPEC Henan Oilfield Company

Production
- Recoverable oil (million tonnes): 350 (2011)

Henan oil field is the second largest oil field in Henan Province, People's Republic of China. It is located in Nanyang region. The field was discovered in the 1970s. It has accumulated proven oil reserves of 350 million tons. It is operated by Sinopec Henan Oilfield Company, a subsidiary of Sinopec.

== Current status ==
Henan oil field is a state-owned oil field base. Its business is a combination of oil and gas exploration and development, fine chemicals manufacturing, construction operation, mechanical engineering, multi-industry production and social services. The four major divisions are oil field engineering, public construction, multi-industry operation and social services. In recent years, Henan oil field is focused on expansion into 21 other provinces and 4 other countries, including Nigeria Oil and Gas Exploration Project, Egypt Oil Field Project and Sudan Top Drive Drilling Project. Markets of its paraffin and drill products are Kazakhstan, Mongolia, Vietnam, the United States and Mexico.

The oil field has 12 second-tier subsidiaries (2011) and 24 exploration units (2004) with 33,000 employees and a total of 120,000 relatives. 2004 financial year total assets are 11.13 billion RMB and net assets are 5.42 billion RMB.
