= China Huanqiu Contracting & Engineering Corporation =

Construction subsidiary

China Huanqiu Contracting & Engineering Corporation is a construction subsidiary of China National Petroleum Corporation specializing in the construction of refineries and chemical fertilizer plants connected to refineries, and mining plants.
