= Dabei gas field =

Natural gas field located in Xinjiang, China

Dabei
- Country: China
- Region: Xinjiang
- Offshore/onshore: onshore
- Operator: China National Petroleum Corporation

Field history
- Discovery: 2006
- Start of production: 2007

Production
- Current production of gas: 13.7×10^{6} m^{3}/d 479.5×10^{6} cu ft/d 5×10^{9} m^{3}/a (180×10^{9} cu ft/a)
- Estimated gas in place: 150×10^{9} m^{3} 5.25×10^{12} cu ft

The Dabei gas field is a natural gas field located in the Kuqa Subbasin in Xinjiang, China. Discovered in 2006, it was developed by the China National Petroleum Corporation, determining it to have initial total proven reserves of around 5.25 trillion ft^{3} (150 km^{3}). It began production of natural gas and condensates in 2007, with a production rate of around 479.5 million ft^{3}/day (13.7×10^{5} m^{3}). It is the deepest and most complex continental condensate gas field in China.

Overpressure evolution of the reservoir indicates that an intense tectonic compression began at circa 5 Ma, which caused thrust activation and concomitant oil charge into the relatively porous part of the reservoir. Subsequent tectonic compression caused uplift and erosion associated with thrusting at the end of the Kuqa Formation deposition (ca. 3 Ma), with thrust faults and fractures acting as major migration pathways for the gas accumulation in the already-tight sandstone reservoir resulting from both compaction and tectonic compression.

== Location and structure ==
Since the late Hercynian period, the basin has undergone several evolutionary stages, such as late Permian-Triassic paleo-foreland basin, Jurassic-Paleogene extensional depression basin and Neogene-quaternary intracontinental foreland basin. It eventually developed into a meso-Cenozoic superimposed foreland basin on the basis of Paleozoic passive continental margin. The Kuqa depression is adjacent to the southern Tianshan orogenic belt in the north and the Tabei Uplift in the south. It is composed of the Northern monoclinal belt, the Kelasu tectonic belt, the Yiqikelike tectonic belt, the Qiulitage tectonic belt, the Southern slope belt, the Baicheng sag, the Yangxia sag and the Wushi sag.
