= Dina-2 gas field =

Natural gas field in Xinjiang, China

Dina-2
- Country: China
- Region: Xinjiang
- Offshore/onshore: onshore
- Operator: China National Petroleum Corporation

Field history
- Discovery: 1998
- Start of production: 2004

Production
- Current production of gas: 5.14×10^{6} m^{3}/d 180×10^{6} cu ft/d 1.88×10^{9} m^{3}/a (66×10^{9} cu ft/a)
- Estimated gas in place: 175×10^{9} m^{3} 6.125×10^{12} cu ft

The Dina-2 gas field is a natural gas field located in Xinjiang, China. Discovered in 1998, it was developed by the China National Petroleum Corporation, determining it to have initial total proven reserves of around 6.12 trillion ft^{3} (175 km^{3}). It began production of natural gas and condensates in 2004, with a production rate of around 180 million ft^{3}/day (5.14×10^{5} m^{3}) in 2010.
