= Zhao Dong =

- 赵东
- Born: July 1970 (age 56); China
- Education: China University of Petroleum
- Occupations: Executive, politician
- Years active: 1998–present
- Agent: China Petrochemical Corporation
- Political party: Chinese Communist Party

Chinese name
- Simplified Chinese: 赵东
- Traditional Chinese: 趙東
Transcriptions
Standard Mandarin
- Hanyu Pinyin: Zhào Dōng

Zhao Dong (Chinese: 赵东; born July 1970) is a Chinese executive and politician of Manchu ethnicity who currently serves as general manager of the China Petrochemical Corporation.

He is an alternate of the 20th Central Committee of the Chinese Communist Party.

== Biography ==
Zhao was born in July 1970.

He was deputy chief accountant of CNPC International (Nile) Co., Ltd. in May 1998 and subsequently chief accountant in July 2002. In January 2005, he became deputy chief accountant of China Petroleum Exploration and Development Company, rising to chief accountant in June 2008. He served as deputy general manager of the PetroChina Nile Company in September 2012, and eleven months later promoted to the general managerposition. After a year as CFO of the PetroChina Co Ltd., he became chief accountant of the Sinopec Group in November 2016. He rose to become general manager in June 2022, succeeding Ma Yongsheng. On 30 April 2024, he succeeded Yu Baocai as president of the Sinopec Group.

Business positions
Preceded by Ma Yongsheng	General Manager of the Sinopec Group; 2022–	Incumbent
Preceded by Yu Baocai	President of the Sinopec Group; 2024–present	Incumbent
