= AED Oil =

Australian oil and gas company

AED Oil Limited
- Type: Public (ASX: AED)
- Industry: Mining – oil and gas exploration and development
- Founded: 1 May 2005
- Headquarters: Melbourne, Australia
- Key people: David Dix (executive chairman and CEO); Pedro De Souza (managing director); John Branson (non-executive director); Barry McGuiness (non-executive director); Richard Price (non executive director); John Imle (non-executive director); Tim Baldwin (non-executive director); Richard Little (chief financial officer); Trevor Slater (company secretary)
- Number of employees: approx. 30
- Website: http://www.aedoil.com

AED Oil Limited is an oil and gas exploration and development company based in Australia with international assets. The company entered voluntary administration in August 2011.

== Overview ==
It is listed on the Australian Securities Exchange with the code AED, and is a component of the S&P/ASX 200 index until it shares were suspended as a result of entering voluntary administration. AED Oil floated on the Australian Securities Exchange (ASX) in May 2005. The company was established for the purpose of acquiring, developing and commercialising specified fields and undertaking oil and gas exploration.

Based in Melbourne, the company has assets in Australia and South East Asian territories with offices in Brunei Darussalam and Jakarta. Since being listed, the company has produced over two million barrels of premium oil from its Puffin field, an oil field off the coast of Australia, in the Timor Sea. In addition, it has acquired contract areas Block-L in Brunei, Rombebai in Papua and South Madura in Indonesia. AED has entered into several partnerships with companies in the oil and gas sector, including Sinopec, Petroleum Brunei, Kulczyk Oil Ventures, QAF Brunei, and Cooper Energy.

AED entered administration as a result of an international arbitration panel that went against AED over Puffin oilfield. The court awarded Sea Production a settlement of $US72.39 million.
