= Chen Tonghai =

Chinese politician

Chen Tonghai (Chinese: 陈同海) is a Chinese oil executive and politician born in 1948 in Shandong.

== Biography ==
Early in the 1980s he became head of an oil refinery in eastern China. He served as mayor of Ningbo and deputy chairman of the National Development and Reform Commission. In 2003, he became chairman of the board of directors of Sinopec. He was removed from his role in 2007. In 2009, he was convicted on bribery charges and sentenced to death. During the investigation he cooperated with authorities and helped them uncover additional bribery cases. In return, his death sentence was suspended. The charges stated that he illegally received 196 million yuan.

His father was Chen Weida.
