= Intercampo oil field =

Oilfield in Lake Maracaibo, Venezuela

Intercampo Oil Field
- Country: Venezuela
- Region: Lake Maracaibo
- Offshore/onshore: offshore
- Operator: China National Petroleum Corporation

Field history
- Discovery: 1960
- Start of production: 1961

Production
- Current production of oil: 10,000 barrels per day (~5.0×10^{5} t/a)
- Estimated oil in place: 170 million tonnes (~ 201.4×10^{6} m^{3} or 1267 million bbl)

The Intercampo Oil Field is an oil field located in Lake Maracaibo. It was discovered in 1960 and developed by China National Petroleum Corporation. The oil field is operated and owned by China National Petroleum Corporation. The total proven reserves of the Intercampo oil field are around 1.26 billion barrels (170 million tonnes), and production is centered on 10,000 barrels per day (1,600 m^{3}/d).

== See also ==
- List of oil fields
