= Yangtze University =

Provincial public university in Jingzhou, Hubei, China

- 长江大学
- Motto: Progress, Innovation
- Type: Public
- Established: 2003
- Students: 56,358
- Location: Jingzhou, Hubei, China
- Website: yangtzeu.edu.cn english.yangtzeu.edu.cn

Yangtze University (长江大学) is a provincial public university in Jingzhou, Hubei, China. It is affiliated with the Province of Hubei and primarily sponsored by the Hubei Provincial People's Government.

== History ==
The school was established in 2003 by the merger of the Jianghan Petroleum Institute (江汉石油学院), the Hubei Agricultural College (湖北农学院), the Jingzhou Teachers College (荆州师范学院), and the Hubei Provincial Healthcare Workers Medical College (湖北省卫生职工医学院).

Yangtze University is the largest comprehensive university with a full range of disciplines among higher education institutions in Hubei Province, one of the Key Universities of Hubei Province, one of the Universities selected for National Education Power Project as well as one of the Domestic First-class Construction Universities of Hubei Province. Moreover, the university is jointly built by People's Government of Hubei Province, China National Petroleum Corporation, China Petroleum & Chemical Corporation, China National Offshore Oil Corporation and the Ministry of Agriculture and Rural Affairs.

The university is mainly located in Jingzhou City, Hubei Province, a historical and cultural city in the middle reaches of the Yangtze River, and it also has Wuhan Campus. The university history of operation can be traced back to 1936, and it has distinctive features in the fields of petroleum science and technology, flooding disaster and wetland agriculture, as well as the study of Jing Chu culture. The university has strong academic strength, and 5 disciplines including engineering, botany & zoology, agricultural science, earth science and clinical medicine have entered the top global 1% of ESI, and the number of selected disciplines ranks the top among provincial universities. The university has 3,107 faculty members, including 2,361 full-time. Among full-time teachers, there are 338 professors and 867 associate professors. There are 2,143 teachers with master and PhD degrees, wherein 1,057 teachers with PhD degrees. 293 teachers have been selected for talent projects and obtained expert titles at provincial and ministerial levels, and 51 of whom have been entitled as national talents. There are 151 doctoral supervisors, 1,217 master's supervisors, 64 part-time doctoral supervisors and 868 part-time master's supervisors.

The university is authorized to recruit students from undergraduate to PhD applicants. There are 3 post-doctoral research stations, and it is entitled to confer PhD degree in 3 first-level programs, academic master's degree in 37 first-level discipline and professional master's degree in 22 programs. Besides, there are 110 undergraduate programs, including 25 national first-class undergraduate programs and 24 provincial first-class undergraduate programs. The undergraduate programs cover 11 main disciplines, including economics, law, education, literature, history, science, engineering, agriculture, medicine, management and art. In the university, now there are 33,405 full-time undergraduates, 7,132 full-time master and PhD students and more than 500 international students. Dating back to the year of establishment, the university has cultivated more than 500,000 professionals of all kinds in total.

With insists on open education, the university has established cooperation with 55 powerful petroleum & petrochemical enterprises and 160 governments and local enterprises above the county level, and thus has been entitled as National Demonstration Institution of Industry-University Research Cooperation Education and Innovation Base for Petroleum Post-graduates in Hubei Province. The university has initiated the establishment of the Belt & Road Language Service Internationalization Talent Cultivation Alliance under School-Enterprise Cooperation, has joined 12 university alliances such as the China-Central and Eastern Europe Association of Universities, and has established collaborative relationships with over 100 institutions in the United States, the United Kingdom, Ireland, South Korea, Japan, Russia, Australia, Sri Lanka, the Czech Republic and other countries and regions, and carried out exchange and cooperation among students, scholars as well as joint research frequently. Besides, the university has collaborated with the Shannon University of Technology in Ireland to organize an undergraduate education project in civil engineering, has established many international joint research platforms, such as a Toxicology Joint Laboratory with the University of Heradz Klalove in the Czech Republic, a Garden Plant Resource Utilization and Germplasm Innovation Center with Seoul University in South Korea and the University of Calgary in Canada, and a Plant Stress Biology Research Center with the University of Tasmania in Australia. Furthermore, the university has been selected as the implementing unit of the CSC International Cooperation and Training Program for Innovative Talents. Last but not least, the university has been approved by the Ministry of Education to enroll high school graduates from Hong Kong, Macau, and Taiwan. It has the qualification to enroll Chinese government scholarships for international students (CSC) in China and has an HSK (New Chinese Proficiency Test) examination center. Up to now, the international students come from 69 countries on 6 continents, including the United States, France, Canada, Russia, Colombia, Indonesia, Brazil, Morocco, Pakistan, Nepal, Ghana, and Papua New Guinea, and 51 of which are along the Belt and Road.
