= ERHC =

American oil and gas corporation

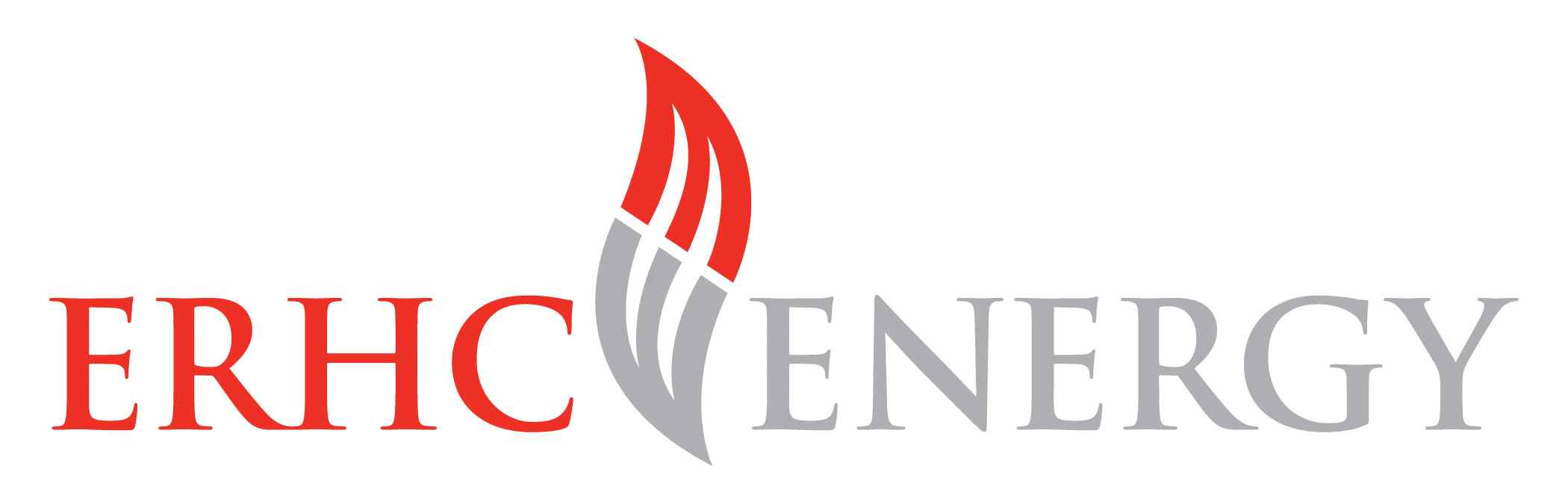
- Company type: Public
- Traded as: Expert Market: ERHE
- Industry: Oil and gas
- Predecessor: Environmental Remediation Holding Corporation
- Founded: 1986
- Headquarters: Houston, Texas, USA
- Area served: Sub-Saharan Africa
- Key people: Peter Ntephe
- Website: erhc.com

ERHC, is a publicly traded American corporation with oil and gas assets in Sub-Saharan Africa. The company has oil and gas exploration interests in the Republic of Kenya, Chad and São Tomé and Príncipe. Oil and gas explorations are also located in the Principe Exclusive Economic Zone (EEZ) and the Nigeria-São Tomé and Príncipe Joint Development Zone (JDZ).

== History ==
ERHC, founded in 1986 in Colorado as the Environmental Remediation Holding Corporation, notably completed an airborne Full Tensor Gravity (FTG) survey of Block 11A in northwestern Kenya in January 2014. Bell Geospace flew the FTG on ERHC's behalf and acquired a total of 14,943.8 line km. The results confirmed that the Lotikipi basin extends into Block 11A and provided the company’s exploration team with new information to aid in the identification of the most prospective areas in the area.

That month ERHC contracted BGP Inc., a Chinese geophysical service company, to its northern Kenya exploration block and identify the best possible drilling spots. The company set aside $40 million for the venture.

In February 2014, ERHC completed its farmout agreement with CEPSA, a Spanish oil and gas company. Following the agreement, CEPSA acquired a 55 percent stake in Block 11A. ERHC retained 35 percent of interest in Block 11A.

Chadian President Idriss Déby gave ERHC his approval to retain oil exploration block BDS 2008 and voluntary relinquishment of the Manga and Chari-Ouest III Blocks in May 2014. The company holds 100% of the interest in block BDS 2008 in southern Chad which encompasses 41800 square km. After the approval, ERHC began using a series of convertible notes to fund a magnetic/gravity survey and a 2D seismic acquisition program.

In 2015, ERHC partnered with Cepsa to further exploration in Kenya on Block 11A. That January, the company announced that it was continuing its exploration program in Kenya. ERHC discovered the Tarach-1 prospect-drilling site for the first exploration well in June 2015. 13 drillable prospects were identified in the basin.
