= Sinopec =

Chinese oil and gas enterprise

China Petroleum and Chemical Corporation

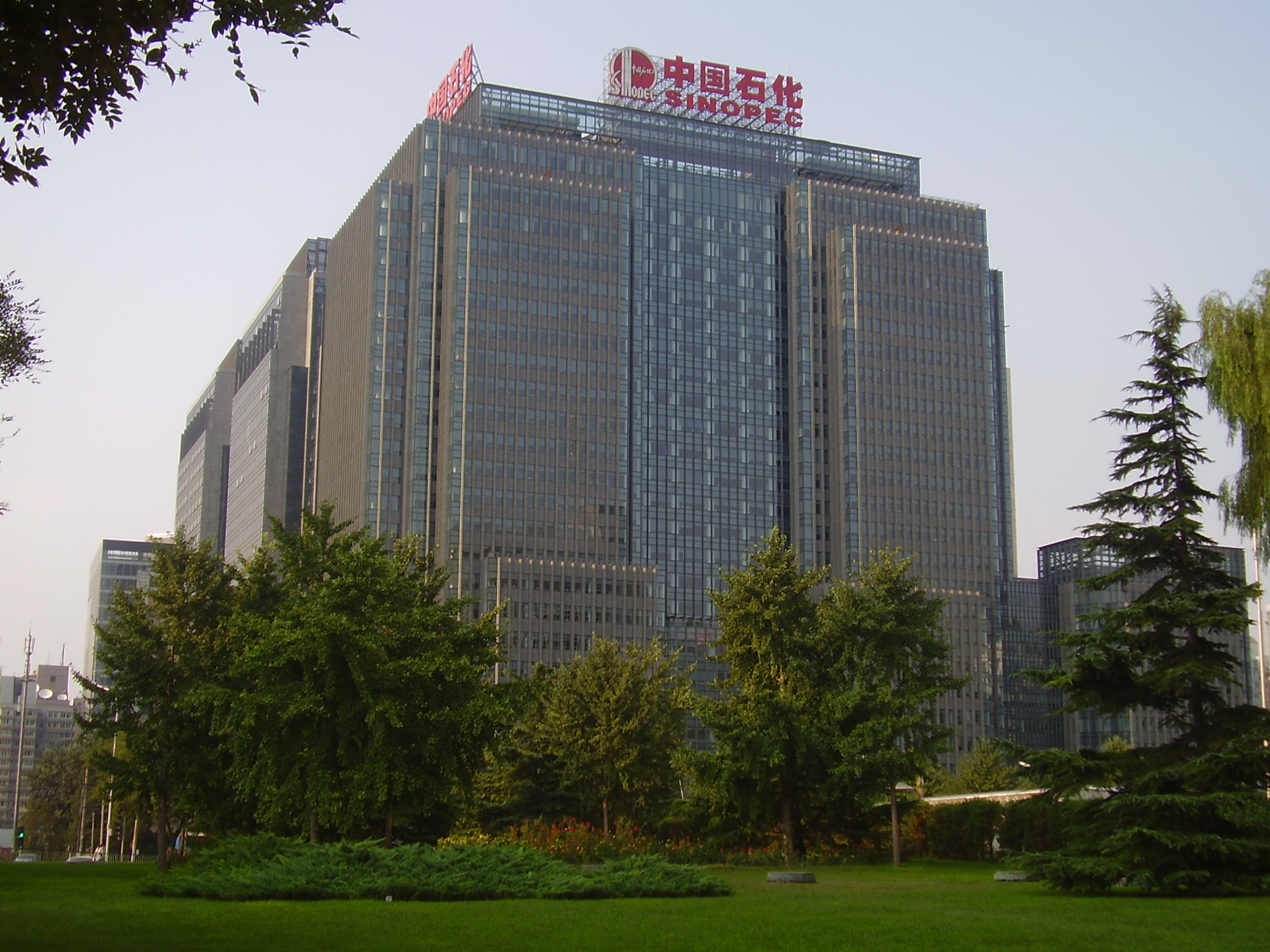
- Headquarters in Beijing
- Native name: 中国石油化工股份有限公司
- Type: Public
- Traded as: SSE: 600028; SEHK: 386; Hang Seng Index component; CSI A50
- Industry: Oil and gas; Petrochemicals
- Founded: 25 February 2000; 26 years ago, in Beijing, China
- Headquarters: Chaoyang District, Beijing, China
- Area served: Worldwide
- Key people: Ma Yongsheng (chairman); Zhao Dong (vice chairman & president)
- Products: Crude oil; Natural gas; Refined petroleum products; Petrochemicals; Lubricants; Synthetic fibers and polymers
- Services: Oil and gas exploration; Oil refining; Retail fuel distribution; Petrochemical engineering
- Revenue: ▼CN¥2.78 trillion (2025) (US$415.52 billion)
- Operating income: ▼CN¥48.6 billion (2025) (US$7.25 billion)
- Net income: ▼CN¥31.8 billion (2025) (US$4.75 billion)
- Total assets: ▲CN¥2.16 trillion (2025) (US$321.78 billion)
- Total equity: ▲CN¥830.3 billion (2025) (US$123.94 billion)
- Number of employees: ▼355,952 (FY25)
- Website: www.sinopecgroup.com

Sinopec
- Simplified Chinese: 中国石油化工股份有限公司
- Traditional Chinese: 中國石油化工股份有限公司
Transcriptions
Standard Mandarin
- Hanyu Pinyin: Zhōngguó Shíyóu Huàgōng Gǔfèn Yǒuxiàn Gōngsī

Abbreviated as
- Simplified Chinese: 中国石化
- Traditional Chinese: 中國石化
Transcriptions
Standard Mandarin
- Hanyu Pinyin: Zhōngguó Shíhuà

Further abbreviated as
- Chinese: 中石化
Transcriptions
Standard Mandarin
- Hanyu Pinyin: Zhōng Shíhuà

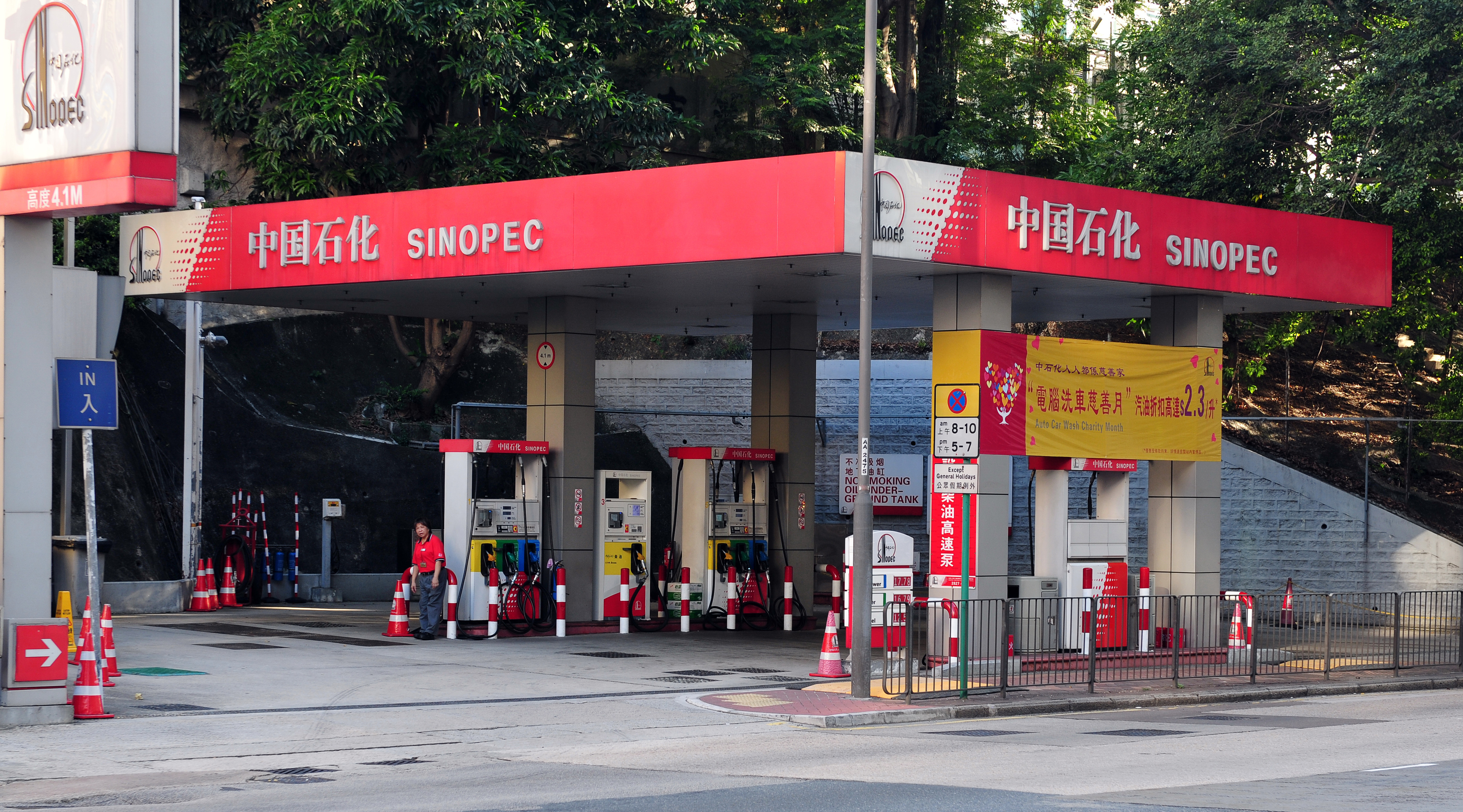
Sinopec in Hong Kong

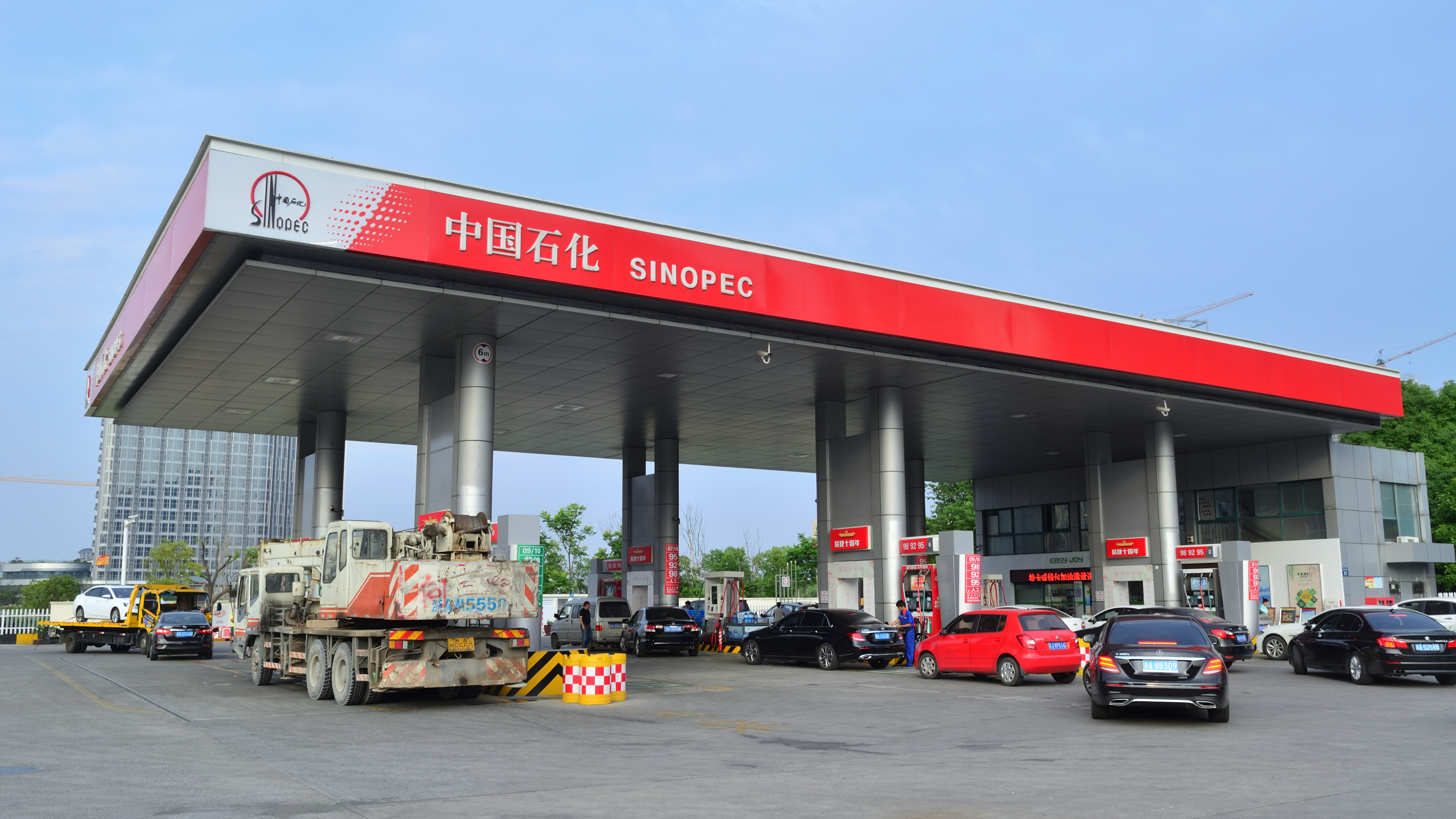
Sinopec in Hangzhou, Zhejiang

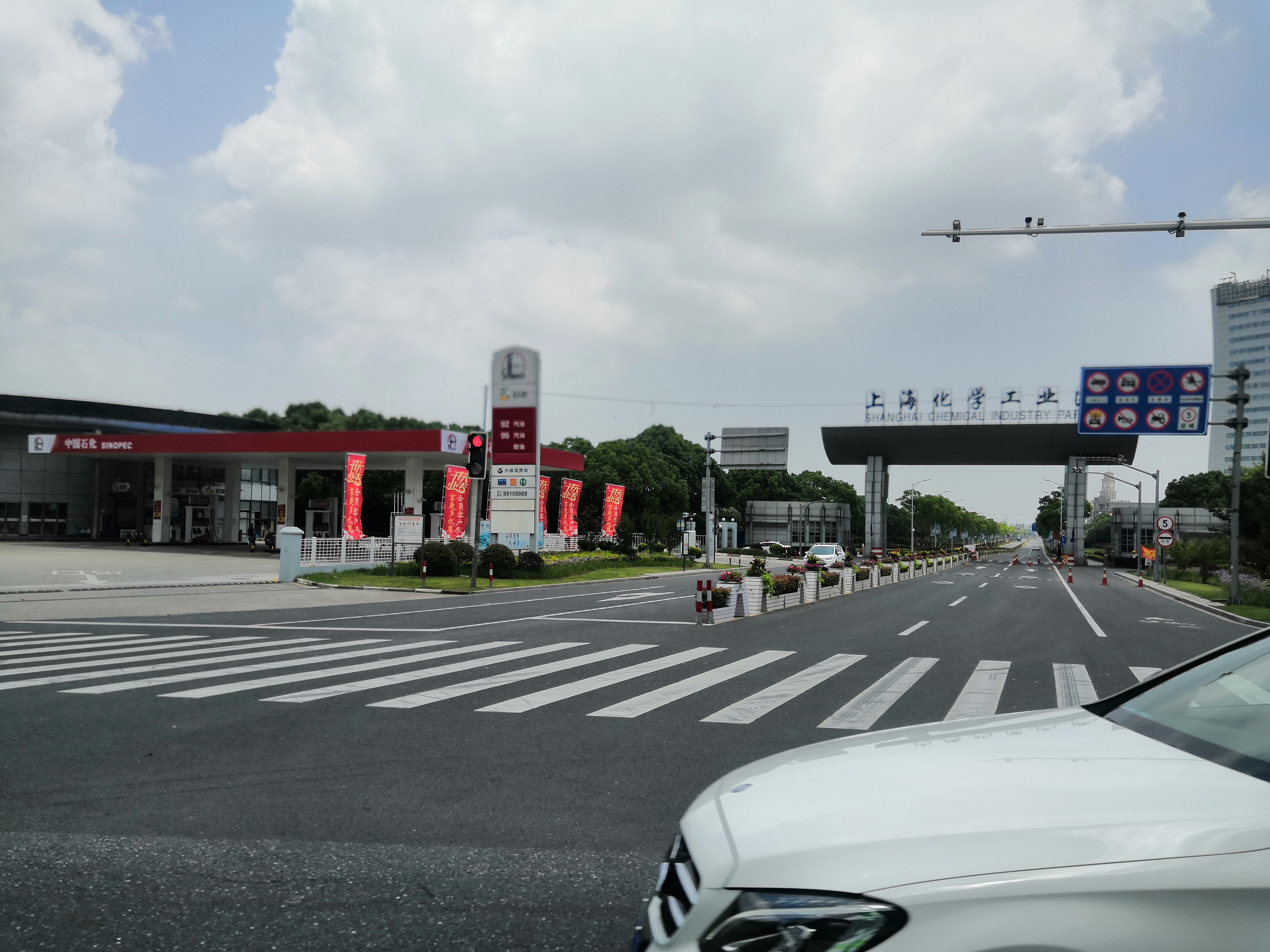
Entrance to Shanghai Chemical Industry Park where Sinopec operates

China Petroleum and Chemical Corporation, or Sinopec Group, is a Chinese oil and gas enterprise based in Chaoyang District, Beijing. The SASAC administers the group for the benefit of the State Council of China. Sinopec Group operates a publicly traded subsidiary, also called Sinopec, listed in Hong Kong and Shanghai stock exchanges. Sinopec Group is the world's largest oil refining conglomerate, state owned enterprise, and 6th highest revenue company in the world.

== History ==
Sinopec was created in 1983 by the State Council out of the Ministry of Petroleum Industry and the Ministry of Chemical Industry. Chen Jinhua was appointed from outside the industry as the president.

=== Domestic ===
Sinopec crude oil production per year, in millions of barrels
year	Domestic	International
2013	310.84	21.7
2014	310.87	49.86
2015	296.34	53.13
2016	253.15	50.36
2017	248.88	44.78
2018	248.93	39.58
2019	249.43	34.79
2020	249.52	30.7
2021	249.6	30.16
2022	250.79	30.07
2023	251.63	29.49

Through the 1990s, Sinopec's profits stagnated due to political conditions, mismanagement, and market conditions. China became a net oil importer in 1993.

In 1993, Sheng Huaren, president and party leader of Sinopec, advocated for the creation of join-stock subsidiaries for the oil industry to engage with international markets. He argued that party based economic planning was ineffective for international oil markets. The following year, Sinopec was allowed to pilot a restructuring which enabled partial public listings of its subsidiaries' assets. Sinopec Limited was established as a joint stock entity under the China Petrochemical Corporation Group (Sinopec Group) in February 2000. The company was simultaneously listed in Hong Kong, New York, and London in October 2000. The IPO raised $3.5 billion. A Shanghai listing was completed in June 2001.

Sinopec Group is a more downstream oil player than PetroChina. Through 1997, Sinopec held 90% of China' oil refining capacity. However, in 1998 Sinopec began expantion into upstream endeavors with a state mandated asset swap with China National Petroleum Corporation (CNPC). The swap gave some of Sinopec's refineries to CNPC in return for Sinopec acquiring some of CNPC's upstream assets. After the swap, Sinopec held about 60% of national refining capacity and 30% of onshore crude oil production capacity.

China entered the WTO in 2001 which some experts claim put additional pressure on their domestic oil industry to be efficient. In the lead up to going public, Sinopec cut over 200,000 jobs from its roster.

BP partnered with Sinopec, in 2005, to build SECCO an ethylene derivatives plant with an initial investment of $2.7 billion. It is located in the Shanghai Chemical Industry Park, and generates over 3.2 million tons of petrochemical products annually. In 2017, Sinopec bought out the remainder of BP's stake in SECCO through its Gaoqiao subsidiary for $1.68 billion. Gaoqiao's operations predate the creation of Sinopec and it operates 75 plants for producing finished petroleum products such as fuels, oils, organic compounds. Ineos bought out half of Sinopec's share of SECCO in 2022 as part of a broader partnership deal.

Sinopec operates the Jiujang Petrochemical Complex which was originally constructed in 1975 and has received a series of improvements over time. The refinery processes 8 million tonnes of crude oil per year. Xi Jinping visited the refinery, in 2023, when the company highlighted the importance of Socialism with Chinese characteristics and presented awards.

Sinopec posted a 6.8% operating margin for the 2006 financial year. Profit was limited in part by government price controls on downstream petrochemical products. The National Development and Reform Commission sets gasoline and diesel prices and the Ministry of Finance collects windfall tax on upstream profits. At the beginning of 2006, Chinese retail gasoline and diesel sales were not profitable for Sinopec and sales were hurting the company's financials. To pressure the NDRC, Sinopec and CNPC cut production causing long lines at the pump. This led to NDRC approving a 15% increase in the price at the pump. To offset losses from the price controls, the state gave Sinopec $1.1 billion in subsidy during 2005 and $647 million in 2006. This finance example demonstrates of Sinopec's implementation of policy adjusted profit. Chinese methods on how to articulate, quantify, and report the sometimes conflicting interests of profit and political policy have evolved during over time. Some commentators on the Shanghai Stock Market, where Sinopec trades, call these methods "valuation with Chinese characteristics". Sinopec demonstrated the "one profit, five rates" method in 2023. This method calls for assessing the company's performance with profit, "asset-liability ratio, return on equity, operating cash ratio, overall labor productivity, and R&D investment intensity".

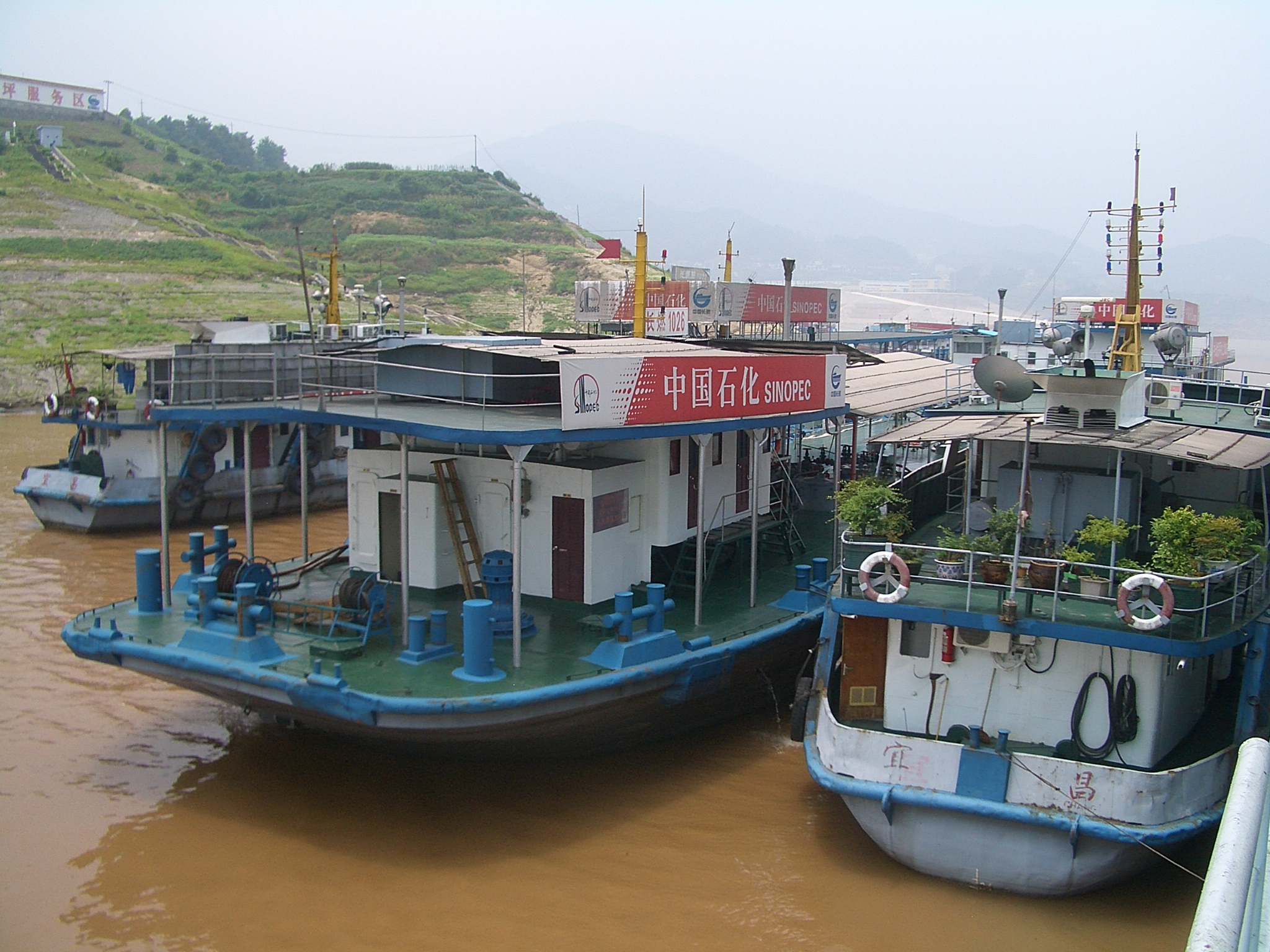
Sinopec's filling stations are a frequent sight on China's roads and rivers.

In February 2007, Saudi Aramco and Exxon signed a deal with Sinopec to revamp the Fujian oil refinery and triple its capacity to 240,000 barrels per day (38,000 m^{3}/d) by 2009. The Saudi Aramco investment is strategically aligned because Saudi Aramco produces a heavier crude oil which is not preferable for other Chinese refining facilities. Aramco, Exxon and Sinopec also signed contracts for a fuel marketing venture that will manage 750 service stations and a network of terminals in Fujian province. Their subsidiaries also expanded cooperation in Tianjin the following year. They invested over $3 billion from 2008 to 2019 expanding the ethylene production capacity multiple times and finally achieving 1.3 million tons per year of production. In Fujian, Sinopec also operates the Gulei Industrial Park. It began as a joint venture with a group of Taiwanese companies operating as Dynamic Ever Investments in 2015. The venture took $4 billion of investment and has a production capacity of 1 million tonnes of ethylene per year. At the time of its approval it was the only Taiwanese petrochemical joint venture in mainland China. It was approved by the Fujian branch of the NDRC which owns a 25% stake in the project. The plant began producing downstream chemicals in 2018 and became fully online in 2021. Phase two began, in 2024, when Saudi Aramco made an additional $9.8 billion investment in the facilities. These expansions are scheduled to be fully operational in 2030.

Sinopec completed construction of a new ethylene plant in Wuhan at the end of 2012. The construction of this plant was done as a joint venture with the South Korean SK Group. This facility was planned in alignment with the National Development and Reform Commission's goal of producing more ethylene domestically in order to rely less heavily on foreign imports. It will provide 800,000 tons/year which is a significant step towards the NDRC's 2015 goal of raising domestic production by 7.5 millions tons/year. In March 2013, Sinopec agreed to pay $1.5 billion for its parent company's overseas oil and gas-producing assets.

Zhejiang Oil Products Company was originally founded in 1950, but began operating under Sinopec in 1998. It is Sinopec's highest selling oil refinery and one of the most important companies in Zhejiang. Sinopec has continuously improved the refining capacity and it ranks as one of the largest refineries in the world. The refinery prioritizes output of non-fuel chemicals at a notably higher rate than comparable refineries. This large scale production, particularly of aromatic compounds hurt foreign competitors. This attracted further investment in China from Saudi Aramco which acquired a 10% stake in Zhejiang Oil Products Company in 2023.

Due to the COVID-19 pandemic, Sinopec reported a loss of 23 billion yuan in the January to June time frame of 2020. In 2021, they reported a 22% increase in revenue as the demand for fuel and oil slowly returned to normal. In 2022, the company reported a 25% net income increase in the first quarter. Diesel output was increased by almost 10% that year and the gasoline production saw only a 0.7% increase.

In 2021, Sinopec began a partnership with NIO, when they unveiled that a NIO Power Swap Station 2.9 would be put into the Sinopec Chaoying Station in Beijing. Additionally, the partnership was to include cooperation between the two companies in new materials, smart EV technology, Battery-as-a-Service (BaaS), construction of recreational facilities, as well as the purchase of vehicles.

China's imports of U.S. natural gas will more than double. In March 2022, a memorandum of understanding was signed between Sinopec and Aramco to strengthen the already existing ties between the companies and to improve their downstream operations.

The Hainan Baling Chemical New Material Company, a Sinopec subsidiary in Hainan, opened a one million tonne per year Styrene-butadiene (SBC) plant in 2023. This new facility made Sinopec the largest producer of SBC in the world at the time. Sinopec began operating the deepest oil well in Asia in 2023. As part of Project Deep Earth the drill went 9432m below Xinjiang. Sinopec and BP have worked together since Sinopec formed. Their joint venture in Zhejiang had 2024 gas stations in 2021. They signed a memorandum of strategic cooperation with BP at the Davos Economic Forum in 2024. Sinopec has set a goal of building 5000 new EV charging stations by 2025 and plans to cooperate with BP on achieving that goal. These and other of Sinopec's environmental goals are aligned with the Fourteenth five-year plan.

In 2025, Sinopec produced 44.22 million tonnes of light chemical feedstock, and processed 250 million tonnes of crude. The company revenue for the year was RMB 2.78 trillion.

=== International ===
Sinopec has demonstrated a willingness, characteristic Chinese national oil companies, to invest in foreign, often risky, infrastructure. These firms work in concert with the Chinese state owned financial sector via direct low cost financing and indirect infrastructure agreements between foreign nations and Chinese banks. Several experts claim that the role of direct financing support is not as important as indirect support. Large foreign purchases are particularly notable in the Chinese context because they require approval by the National Development and Reform Commission and the State Council. Sinopec made failed attempts to acquire Iranian oil reserves in 2001 and Kazakh reserves in 2003. In subsequent years, Sinopec relied more heavily on off-taker agreements to gain access to foreign markets. The 2008 financial crisis made a large impact on Chinese foreign policy and Chinese oil companies put a higher priority on mergers and acquisitions in the following years.

According to the OECD, foreign oil ventures are an attractive investment for Chinese national oil companies because China is a large importer of oil and wants to control its supply chain. Some Chinese observes agree with this assessment and highlight Sinopec's 2005 goal of importing 15 million tons of crude oil for refinement in China. China's Go Out policy explicitly stated, in 2001, that Sinopec should "make effective use of overseas resources, build the overseas oil and gas supply bases and diversify the oil imports". This was revised in 2006 to "broaden international oil and gas cooperation". According to the company, in 2022, foreign operations were staffed 74% by local workers rather than Chinese employees.

Sinopec began its partnership with Iran in 2001, and signed a 30 year deal to invest $70 billion in the development of Yadavaran Field in 2004. Contract negotiation for this program took three years such that technical work and funding did not actually begin until 2007. The US pressured China to block the investment due to sanctions, but Iran claims that pressure did not delay the deal. Iran expressed pleasure with the deal and stated the goal of replacing Japan with China as the primary exporter of Iranian oil. There is little agreement about the exact amount of oil and gas available through the Yadavaran project, but all claim that it is a large oil field by global standards. The first phase of drilling was completed in 2012 and production continued to expand. Sinopec claims to have ceased buying this oil due to US sanctions in 2019.

Amid rising global oil prices linked to the U.S.- Israel conflict with Iran, on 23 March 2026, Sinopec announced an increase in gasoline prices to 2,205 yuan per metric ton, effective 24 March. The National Development and Reform Commission subsequently limited the increase to 1,160 yuan per metric ton.

Sinopec established its first drilling rig in Saudi Arabia in 2000. In 2004, Sinopec began exploring in Saudi Arabia.

Unipec, a subsidiary of Sinopec, signed a contract with French oil company Total Gabon in February 2002. Under the contract China, for the first time, bought Gabonese crude oil. During his African visit, in 2004, Hu Jintao signed a series of bilateral trade accords with his Gabonese counterpart Omar Bongo, including a "memorandum of agreement aimed at showing the parties' desire to develop exploration, exploitation, refining and export activities of oil products". Three onshore fields were to be explored. One of the three blocks, LT2000, is some 200 kilometers (120 mi) southeast of Gabon's economic hub, Port Gentil, which lies south of the capital, Libreville, on the Atlantic coast. The other two — DR200 and GT2000 - are around 100 kilometres (62 mi) northeast of Port Gentil, according to the Gabonese oil ministry. In 2013 and 2014 Sinopec and the Gabonese government had significant disputes over licensing and fees. The Gabonese government nationalized one of the oilfields that Sinopec was previously licensed to extract from. Ultimately negotiations between the parties resulted in new leases for Sinopec's further extraction.

In 2004, the Export–Import Bank of China signed a $2 billion loan with Angola to finance infrastructure projects by Chinese companies. This led to the Angolan government blocking a deal between Shell and India's Oil and Natural Gas Corporation in favor of a deal with Sinopec.

In 2005, Sinopec and CNPC jointly purchased EnCana an Ecuadorian Petrochemical company for $1.42 billion. The purchase gave the joint venture, called Andes Petroleum Company, access to over 62,000 barrels per day of crude and the OCP pipeline which can pump 450,000 barrels per day. It was the largest petrochemical deal in Ecuadorian history. Beginning in 2012, Chinese banks began large financing agreements with Ecuador to pre-pay for oil procured via Andes Petroleum. Ecuador conducted major oil industry reforms in 2007 and 2010 which promoted many international oil companies to exit the Ecuadorian market. Sinopec, on the other hand, remained. As part of these reforms, Ecuador required that local labor be used for over 90% of unskilled and administrative positions. This put an end to further disputes about local job creation. International observers note that Andes Petroleum's operations were among the most successful in Ecuador through 2014. This success prompted an expansion of its operations. The company has generally had better relations with the local population than EnCana did. Most of the planned expansions were halted in 2019 when opposition from environmental activists and small indigenous tribes prompted Ecuadorian courts to find that the tribes had not been properly consulted.

Sinopec is a partner in Petrodar Operating Company Ltd., a consortium whose partners also include China National Petroleum Corporation and Sudapet (the Sudanese state-owned oil company), among others. In 2005, Petrodar commenced production of oil in blocks 3 and 7 in South-east Sudan and transported them via its new pipeline. Petrodar's operations represent a major increase in overall Sudanese oil production. Sinopec is also looking into other companies such as ERHC Energy which has multiple oil block assets in the Joint Development Zone. When South Sudan seceded it took most of Sudan's oil reserves with it. The Petrodas pipeline is used to transport South Sudan's oil for export in Sudan. In 2024, fighting in the vicinity of Singa, Sudan halted the flow.

In 2006, Sinopec began operations in Russia with a Rosneft partnership. The companies invested in Sakhalin-III and oil was first drilled in 2006. Rosneft expanded its cooperation with Sinopec in a joint venture called Udmurtneft. They acquired access to 551 million barrels of proven reserves and facilities capable of producing 120,000 barrels per day. The entirety of the deal was financed by Sinopec, but the total price was not disclosed. The sellers claimed offers were $4 billion.

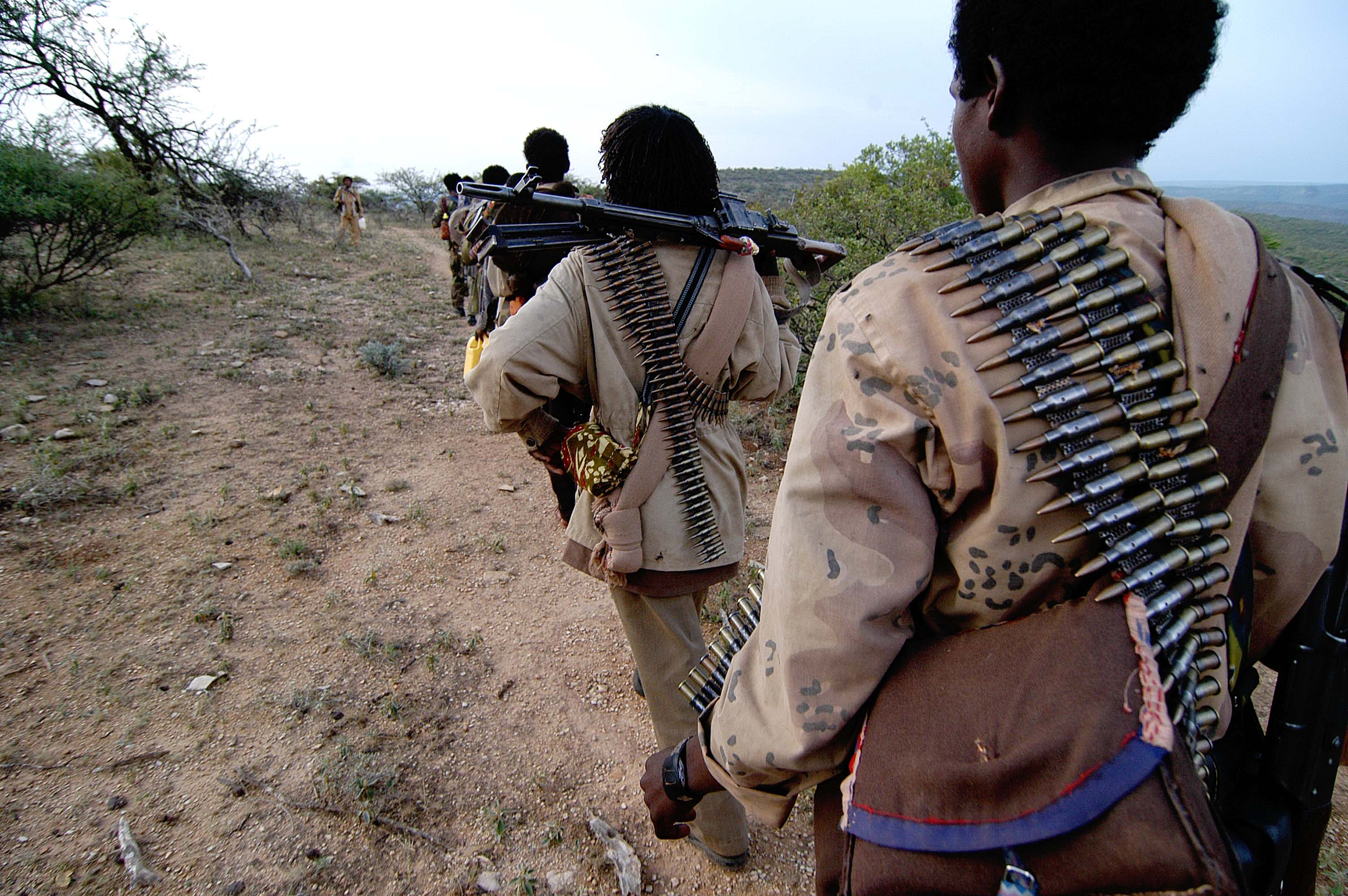
Column of ONLF rebels

In 2007, in eastern Ethiopia's Ogaden Desert, a raid by an ethnic Somali rebel group on a Sinopec drilling site left 74 dead including 9 Chinese oil workers, and 7 kidnapped. The rebels, the Ogaden National Liberation Front (ONLF), later released the seven abductees and warned foreign companies against working in the area. Sinopec said it had no plans to pull out of the resource-rich region despite the attack. Chinese Foreign Ministry spokesperson Liu Jianchao says that China strongly condemns the violent attack carried out by Somali insurgents on the premises of the oil company Sinopec in Ethiopia.

In 2008, Sinopec bought Tanganyika Oil for $2 billion giving Sinopec access to its Syrian oil fields. These fields were reported to have over a billion barrels of crude reserves and a trillion cubic feet of natural gas reserve. However, the Syrian investments became significantly less valuable in 2012 when the Syrian civil war began. The turmoil forced Sinopec to stop regular operations in Syria. The company negotiated with several parties in Syria on multiple occasions in an attempt to restart operations.

Sinopec also began investing in Australia in 2008 with its $594 million purchase of a 60% stake in AED Oil. AED was heavily indebted at the time of the purchase in part due to the Puffin oil fields producing less than expected. Sinopec took over operation of these fields after the sale.

In 2009, Sinopec acquired Addax Petroleum Corp for $7.24 billion. This was the largest foreign purchase by a Chinese company. Addax was producing an average of 136,500 barrels per day. Addax was based in Geneva at the time, but the Geneva office was closed in 2017 after Sinopec agreed to pay $31.8 million to settle a Swiss bribery investigation of their operations in Nigeria. Sinopec claimed the office closure was due to low oil prices. The alleged bribes stemmed from a tax dispute between Sinopec Addax and the Nigerian government. Both sides claimed they had not received their fair share of benefits. The dispute was settled in 2015. Addax's resources were concentrated in West Africa and Kurdistan. Sinopec's assumption of the agreements with the Kurds created difficulty in forming new agreements with the Iraqi government because Iraq has a long standing policy against dealing with anyone who makes agreements with the Kurds. However these issues did not spread to other Chinese energy companies.

On 13 April 2010 the company announced acquisition of Conoco Phillips's 9% stake in the Canadian oil sand firms, Syncrude, for $4.65bn. While largely welcomed by industry, Sinopec's Syncrude stake has raised concerns about the influence the Chinese government may try to exert on Canadian policy makers. The following year, Sinopec took over Daylight Energy for C$2.2 billion ($2.1 billion). Daylight was then renamed Sinopec Daylight Energy Ltd.. The OECD and Chinese observers note Sinopec's attraction to the Syncrude deal is partly explained by a desire to acquire technical knowledge on oil sands extraction which can be used to boost domestic oil production.

Sinopec invested $7.1 billion in Repsol Brazil to begin a new partnership in 2010. Chinese observers note that part of Sinopec's motivation for the deal was to bring deep water drilling expertise to China. In 2011, Sinopec additionally invested $5.2 billion for a 30 percent stake in the Brazilian unit of Galp Energia SGPS SA which owns the rights to biggest discovered oil reserve in the western hemisphere since 1976. This brought the total investment of Chinese energy companies in foreign oil assets for the year to $16 billion.

Sinopec partnered with Chevron Corporation on a deep water drilling operation in Indonesia in 2011. The project is located in the Kutai Basin and has access to 15 million barrels of crude oil reserve and 700 billion cubic feet of natural gas. The deal closed with Sinopec getting an 18% stake for $680 million. This project aligned with China's goal of doubling gas' share of energy production during the 2009-2015 period.

Unipec first became involved in Ghana in December 2011 when Ghana National Petroleum Corporation agreed to supply 13,000 barrels of oil per day for the following 15 years in return for the Master Facility Agreement. The MFA was a $3 billion six year loan from CDB which Ghanaian President Mills and Hu-Jintao directly negotiated on. The MFA also required Ghana to spend most of the funds on projects constructed by Chinese contractors. Unipec was awarded the first $750 million of these funds to build the Atuabo Gas Plant. In 2013, Unipec halted work on the project to pressure Ghana into making amendments to the MFA that CDB had requested. By 2014, Ghana had only received $600 million of the promised MFA funds.

On 31 October 2011 Sinopec Addax acquired Shell Oil Company's 80% share of an exploration firm called Pecten that explores and drills in various offshore locations including the oil basin near Douala, Cameroon in cooperation with TotalEnergies.

BP and Sinopec was expanded on an existing base of joint ventures via new bunker fuel projects in 2015. Bunker fuel was then delivered to ports in Singapore, China, and Europe in 2020. Sinopec Addax made a $1.5 billion investment in North Sea drilling operations in 2012. The investment was rebranded multiple times. Originally, the deal was with Talisman Energy and Sinopec exited this investment after a dispute with Repsol was settled for $2.1 billion. The dispute began in 2015 over amounts paid by Sinopec and was settled in 2023. In 2013, company sold a 30 percent stake of an oil and gas block in Myanmar to Taiwan's CPC Corp. This was followed by Sinopec's acquisition of a 33% stake in Apache Corporation's oil and gas business in Egypt for $3.1 billion.

In June 2013, Sinopec agreed to acquire Marathon Oil Corp's Angolan offshore oil and gas field for $1.52 billion. As of at least 2023, Sinopec is a part minority owner of several offshore projects via Sinopec's half ownership of a joint venture with the private company Sonangol Sinopec International. Sinopec is also a part owner of the joint venture POLY-GCL Petroleum, which as of 2023 is developing a $4 billion natural gas project in Ethiopia, which will include a pipeline to the Djiboutian coast and an export terminal. According to David H. Shinn and academic Joshua Eisenman, the Ethiopian project underscore China's commitment to expanding its import of liquified natural gas from African countries. In November 2021, U.S. producer Venture Global LNG signed a twenty-year contract with Sinopec to supply liquefied natural gas (LNG).

In January 2022 they offered to re-sell LNG to take advantage of high Asian spot prices. Following the 2022 Russian invasion of Ukraine the company continued doing business in Russia. For this reason Ukraine listed Sinopec as an International Sponsors of War. Unipec, a subsidiary of Sinopec, is an intermediary for banned Russian oil. In March 2025, Sinopec reportedly halted purchases of Russian oil due to international sanctions. In April 2023, an agreement was signed between Sinopec and QatarEnergy, making Sinopec the first Asian buyer to participate in the eastern expansion of Qatar's North Field liquefied natural gas project, with a 5% stake in an 8 million tonnes per year LNG train. The contract has a 27-year term making it the longest ever purchase agreement for LNG. At the end of June 2023, Sinopec Overseas Investment Holding was established as a vehicle for investment, construction and operation of overseas refineries. Overseas investments at the time amount to 400,000 barrels per day at the Yasref refinery, as well as the $10 billion Amur Gas Chemical Complex in East Siberia. In September 2023, Sinopec used a tender to purchase 30 cargoes of LNG from more than 10 suppliers for additional supply to begin in October 2023. This additional supply helped China during the winter months as well as offset the lacking supply from Venture Global. On 17 October 2023, an equity agreement was signed between Sinopec and KazMunayGas JSC for a 30% stake in a $7.7bn polyethylene project in Kazakhstan, which is expected to start construction in the second half of 2024. In 2023, Sinopec was approved to invest $4.5 billion in refinery construction at Hambantota International Port, Sri Lanka.

== Governance ==
Sinopec is one of the "core" central SOEs overseen by SASAC.

The chairman of China Petroleum and Chemical Corporation, like all Chinese National Oil Companies, is a vice minister. This is a political appointment set by the Ministry of Personnel. This means that the post is always given to high ranking communist party members as a reward for career achievement in the industry. Due to the high ranking nature of China Petroleum and Chemical Corporation's leaders in the Chinese communist party, the party does not have total control over the company and the company can exert influence on the government to get support in financing, international agreements, and pricing. For example, even though the state owns China Petroleum and Chemical Corporation, the company did not pay the state any dividends until 2008. China Petroleum and Chemical Corporation also appoints a member to the Central Committee of the Chinese Communist Party. Chinese officials have seen some of Sinopec's investments as too politically risky. The Iran and Sudan oil partnerships in particular led to regulatory change by State-owned Assets Supervision and Administration Commission of the State Council to hold Sinopec's leaders personally responsible if risky investments cost the government financially.

NEC: National Energy Commission; SASAC State Assets Supervision and Administration Commission; MOF: Ministry of Finance; MOFA: Ministry of Foreign Affairs; NDRC: National Development and Reform Commission; NEA: National Energy Administration; CBRC: China Banking Regulatory Commission; SOE: state‐owned enterprise

Sinopec is governed by a Board of directors. The members are nominated by a committee including the chairman of the board and then board makes decisions on these nominations. The board has highlighted its achievement on diversity, including gender diversity, in its annual report. The report highlights that 10% of the members of Board of Directors are female and 31% of the employees are female. Sinopec's audits, like other publicly traded Chinese firms, are not subject to independent oversight.

The former head of the companies' board of directors Chen Tonghai was sentenced to death in July 2009 after being accused of corruption. He had been relieved of his post in 2007. He was replaced by Su Shulin who was formerly the head of CNPC. The company culture moved on from Chen and acted as if he had never existed.

Chinese crude oil imports are regulated by the central government via quotas. Prior to 2015, these quotas were restricted to the NOC so that any private refiner would have to buy from the NOCs. In 2013, the NOCs opposed proposals to open crude oil imports to private refineries. In 2014, as part of the anti-corruption campaign under Xi Jinping inspectors found further corruption within Sinopec. The NOCs then did not oppose the 2015 push for granting crude import licenses to private firms.

=== Early governance ===
Sinopec began as the primary manager for the downstream oil market. It was responsible for purchasing crude, predict demand of finished products and investing accordingly. However, the company created a system of subsidiaries and joint ventures to manage investments with their own balance sheets. An abundance of exceptions to this modus operandi was created by government officials intervening in local operations, national managers intervening in local operations, local and regional managers lobbying party and government officials for pressure on the national managers, and other deviations. This led to a system in which there was no single locus of power.

== Environmental and safety record ==
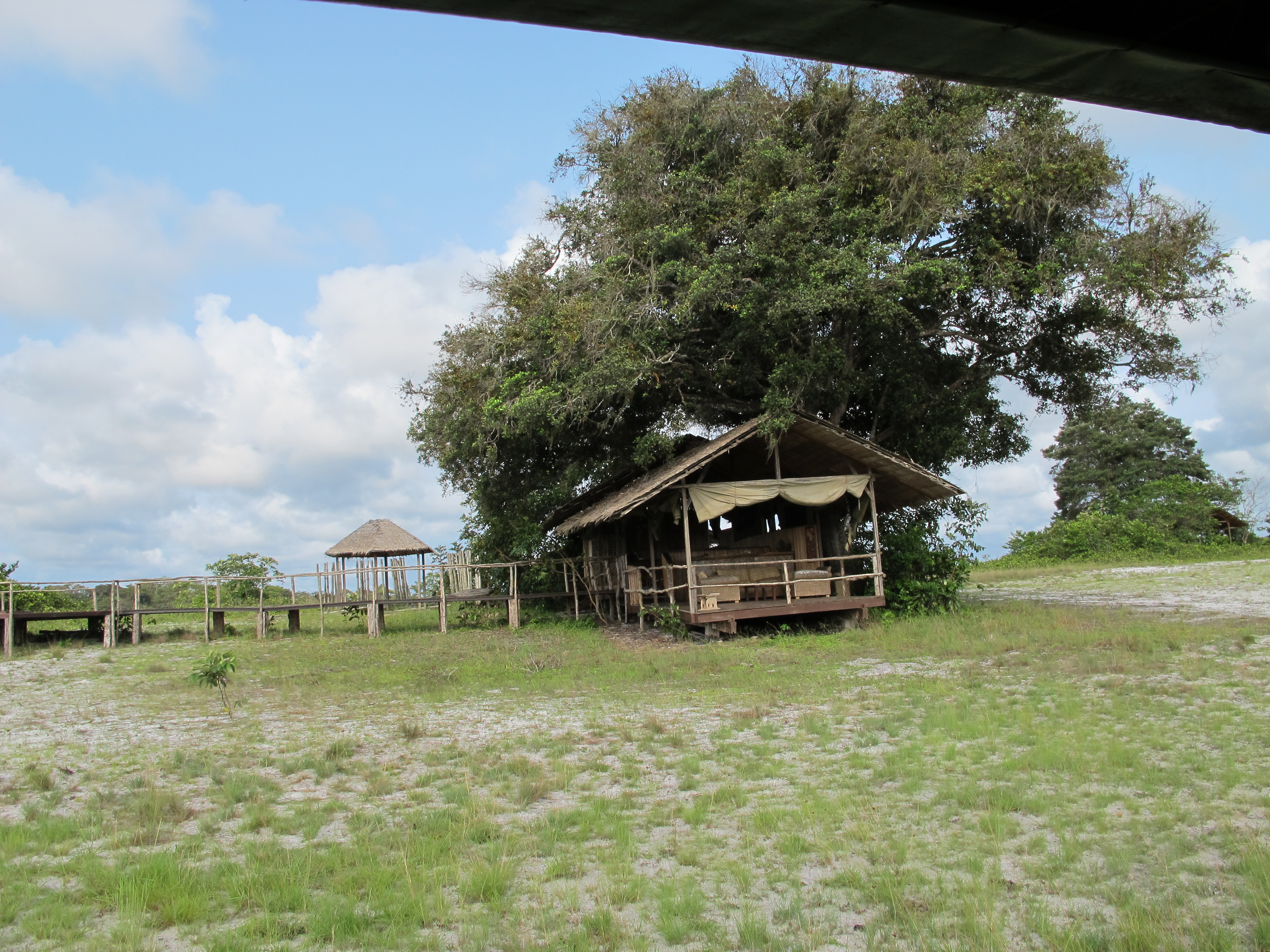
Campground in Loango National Park

In 2004, Sinopec prospected for oil in the 1,550 square kilometers of Loango National Park in southern Gabon and encountered criticism for what domestic and foreign environmental critics said were poor and damaging methods. Primatology professor Christophe Boesch of the US-based environmental organization, the Wildlife Conservation Society (WCS), criticized the use of dynamite and heavy machinery in exploration and road construction by Sinopec through park, noting that it might drive native gorillas deeper into the jungle, where they would be outside legal restrictions on hunting. Gabonese law states that industries can extract oil from national parks, but must rehabilitate them to the prior condition. Boesch, and other international experts, have suggested that Sinopec use other methods such as horizontal drilling to minimize its environmental footprint. Sinopec's activities in Gabon's national parks were suspended in September 2006, by the Gabonese national parks council. In 2007, Sinopec redid its earlier environmental study, this time in conjunction with the Gabonese environmentalist group Enviropass and the World Wildlife Foundation, winning high marks from Gabonese, Western, and Chinese conservation experts. Shortly thereafter, Sinopec resumed production with more environmentally friendly methods.

On 21 December 2006, gas started leaking during the drilling of a test well by the Sinopec Southern Prospecting and Development Branch in Quingxi. 12,380 people were evacuated after the leakage occurred. It took at least three attempts and two weeks for the company to seal the leak.

China's top environmental watchdog warned Sinopec in 2007 to stop operations at one of its oil fields due to chronic river pollution. Zhongyuan Oilfields Petrochemical Company, a unit of Sinopec, had failed to meet waste water treatment requirements and had been ordered to pay a pollution fine and operations had to be halted, according to the State Environmental Protection Administration (SEPA).

Guangdong Provincial Environment Bureau (GPEB) had also issued a red sign warning to 19 companies, including Sinopec Guangzhou, in February 2008. By GPEB's standard, the companies that have involved in excessive emissions or caused serious environmental pollution accidents will be given the red sign warning and will be placed under strict supervision.

An oil pipeline explosion on Friday, 22 November 2013, in Qingdao, Shandong province killed at least 62 people, injuring 136, and displacing hundreds more after oil previously leaking onto a street during the day ignited.

In 2021, the company's total climate-warming greenhouse gases emissions reached 172.56 million tonnes of CO_{2} equivalent. By 2023, emissions were down slightly to 169 million tonnes of CO_{2} equivalent but the company still ranked second for greenhouse gas emissions among oil companies worldwide.

== Renewable energy ==
As of 2021 Sinopec was the largest supplier of geothermal energy in China. Sinopec plans to expand this with the goal of creating what their leadership calls "smogless cities".

Sinopec has developed a megatonnes carbon capture, utilisation and storage (CCUS) project in China. It consists of two parts, the Sinopec Qilu carbon capture and the Shengli Oil Field CO_{2} shifting and storage. The project has been operational since January 2022. Sinopec has partnered with other firms for additional research and development CCUS projects.

By 2021, Sinopec was already the largest Chinese producer of grey hydrogen which is hydrogen fuel produced via petrochemical processing without recapturing the carbon. In 2023, Sinopec constructed its first solar powered green hydrogen facility in Xinjiang which plans to produce annually 20,000 tonnes be transported to and consumed by Sinopec's Tahe refinery. Sinopec's Demonstration Project of Hydrogen Transmission Pipeline from Ulanqab to Beijing-Tianjin-Hebei Region will connect additional grey, blue, and green hydrogen projects to Beijing by building a pipeline transportation network from Inner Mongolia to Beijing. Sinopec claims a lack of transportation infrastructure is one of the main barriers to hydrogen adoption. One such example is a 20,000 tonne per year green hydrogen wind farm built outside Ordos City in 2023.

== Research institutions ==
Sinopec operates several research institutions. It has operated the Research Institute for Petroleum Processing (RIPP) since before its IPO. The RIPP began operation in 1956 and continues to create new patents which Sinopec can leverage in its operations. In addition to fuels and petrochemicals, Sinopec develops lubricants for use in automotive, industrial and marine applications.

== Finances ==
Year	Revenue (US$ billions)	Profit (US$ billions)	Assets (US$ billions)	Equity (US$ billions)	Employees
2014	446.8	5.2	359.2	118.6	897,488
2015	294.3	3.6	317.0	112.5	810,538
2016	267.5	1.3	310.7	106.5	713,288
2017	327.0	1.5	346.5	113.7	667,793
2018	414.6	5.8	329.2	105.2	619,151
2019	407.0	6.8	317.5	107.7	582,648
2020	283.7	6.2	343.3	121.1	553,833
2021	401.3	8.3	380.7	133.5	542,286
2022	471.2	9.7	368.8	132.2	527,487
2023	429.7	9.4	382.7	130.0	513,434
2024	407.5	8.0	375.4	124.4	495,096
2025	364.0	5.1	391.7	125.4	488,019

== See also ==
- Chemical industry in China
