= China National Petroleum Corporation =

Chinese major national oil and gas corporation

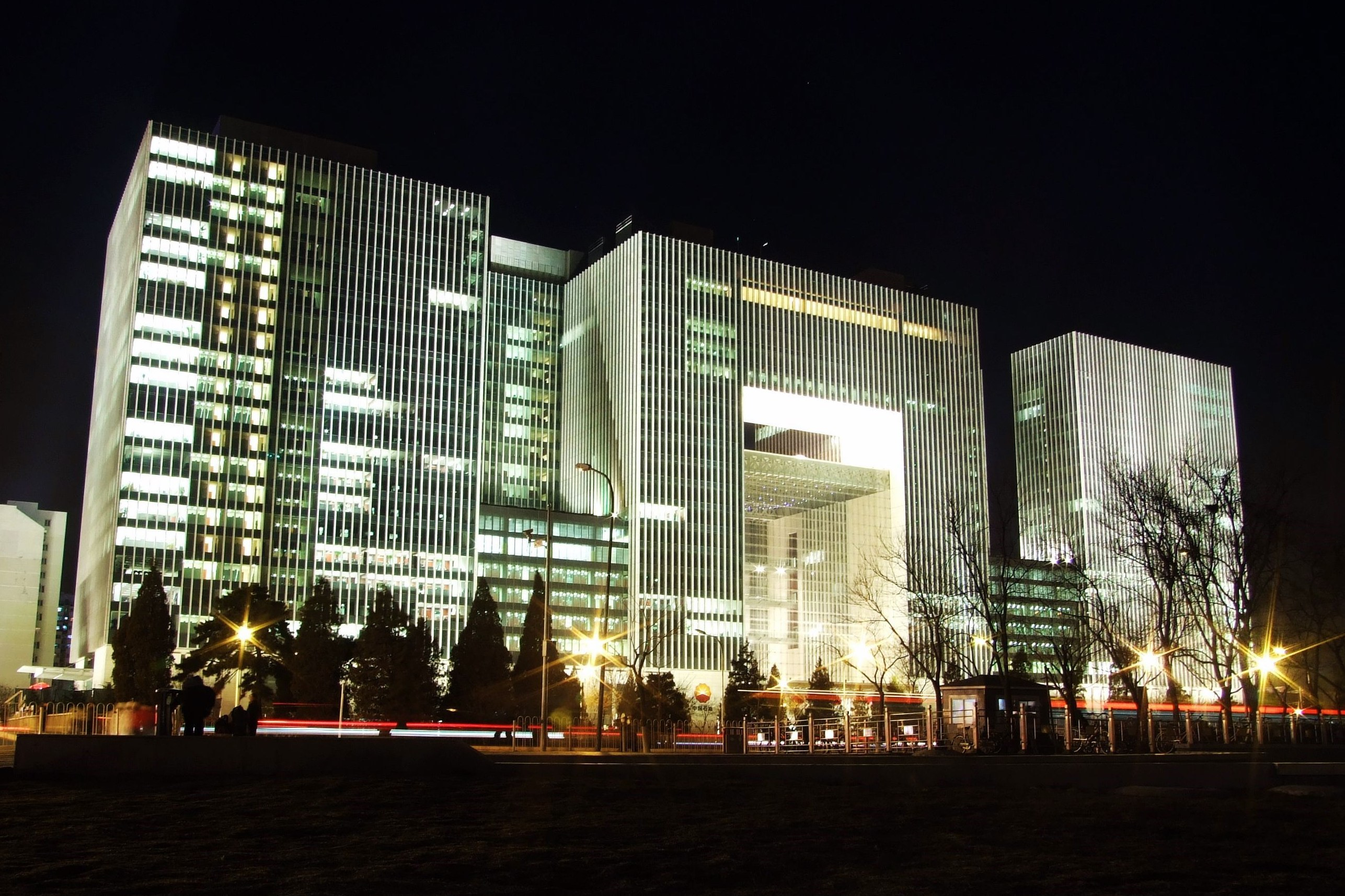
- CNPC headquarters
- Native name: 中国石油天然气集团有限公司
- Type: State-owned enterprise
- Industry: Oil and gas; Petrochemicals
- Founded: 1988; 38 years ago
- Headquarters: Dongcheng District, Beijing, China
- Number of locations: ▲22,612 (service stations) (2019)
- Area served: Worldwide
- Key people: Dai Houliang (chairman); Hou Qijun (president)
- Products: Crude oil; Natural gas; Refined petroleum products; Petrochemicals
- Production output: ▼178.64 million MT crude oil (2020) ▲160.35 billion CM natural gas (2020)
- Services: Oil and gas exploration; Oil refining; Drilling and oilfield services; Pipeline transport
- Revenue: ▼CN¥3.136 trillion (2024)
- Operating income: ▲CN¥301.0 billion (2024)
- Net income: ▲CN¥205.9 billion (2024)
- Total assets: 4,034,097,790,000 ±5000 renminbi (2015)
- Number of employees: ▼985,155 (2025)
- Subsidiaries: PetroChina
- Website: www.cnpc.com.cn/en/
- Footnotes in consolidated basis

China National Petroleum Corporation
- Simplified Chinese: 中国石油天然气集团公司
- Traditional Chinese: 中國石油天然氣集團公司
Transcriptions
Standard Mandarin
- Hanyu Pinyin: Zhōngguó Shíyóu Tiānránqì Jítuán Gōngsī

Abbreviated as
- Simplified Chinese: 中国石油集团
- Traditional Chinese: 中國石油集團
Transcriptions
Standard Mandarin
- Hanyu Pinyin: Zhōngguó Shíyóu Jítuán

The China National Petroleum Corporation (CNPC; Chinese: 中国石油天然气集团公司; pinyin: Zhōngguó Shíyóu Tiānránqì Jítuán Gōngsī) (Note: A common shortname for the corporation in Chinese, Zhongguo Shiyou (中国石油), formerly shared the same name as the Chinese Petroleum Corporation, the Republic of China (Taiwan)'s state-owned fuel corporation.) is a major national oil and gas corporation of China and one of the largest integrated energy groups in the world. Its headquarters are in Dongcheng District, Beijing. CNPC was ranked fourth in 2022 Fortune Global 500, a global ranking of the largest corporations by revenue.

In 2024, CNPC was responsible for 655 Mt of CO_{2} emissions, which was 1.7% of global CO_{2} emissions.

== Corporate structure ==
CNPC is the government-owned parent company of publicly listed PetroChina, which was created on November 5, 1999, as part of the restructuring of CNPC. In the restructuring, CNPC injected into PetroChina most of the assets and liabilities of CNPC relating to its hydrocarbon exploration and production, refining and marketing, chemicals and natural gas businesses. CNPC and PetroChina develop overseas assets through a joint venture, the CNPC Exploration & Development Company (CNODC), which is 50% owned by PetroChina.

In March 2014, CNPC Chairman Zhou Jiping announced that CNPC would be opening six business units to private investors.

CNPC also has a memorandum of understanding with UOP Llc, under which the two companies will collaborate on a range of biofuels technologies and projects in China.

== History ==
Unlike the Chinese Petroleum Corporation (CPC Corporation), which was relocated to Taiwan with the retreat of the Republic of China following the communist revolution in 1949, CNPC originated as a governmental department under the Government of the People's Republic of China. In 1949, the Chinese government formed a 'Fuel Industry Ministry' dedicated to the management of fuel. In January 1952 a division of the fuel ministry was formed to manage petroleum exploration and mining, called the 'Chief Petroleum Administration Bureau'. In July 1955 a new ministry was created to replace the Fuel Industry Ministry, called the Ministry of Petroleum. From 1955 to 1969, approximately 4 oil fields were found in 4 areas in Qinghai, Heilongjiang (Daqing oilfield), Bohai Bay and Songliao basin. CNPC was created on 17 September 1988, when the government decided to create a state-owned company to handle all Petroleum activities in China and disbanded the Ministry of Petroleum.

CNPC's international operations began in 1993. The CNPC subsidiary SAPET signed a service contract with the government of Peru to operate Block VII in the Talara Province basin. This was followed by an oil contract with the government of Sudan "In June 1997, the Greater Nile Petroleum Operating Company was established with the China National Petroleum Corporation (CNPC) taking 40 percent ownership". In August 2005 it was announced that CNPC agreed to buy the Alberta-based PetroKazakhstan for US$4.18 billion, then the largest overseas acquisition by a Chinese company. The acquisition went through on 26 October 2005 after a Canadian court turned down an attempt by LUKoil to block the sale. In 2006 67% of shares were sold from the parent company to PetroChina In June 1997, the company bought a 60.3% stake in the Aktobe Oil Company of Kazakhstan, and in July 1997 CNPC won an oil contract for the Intercampo oilfield and East Caracoles oilfield in Venezuela.

In July 1998, the government restructured the company in accordance with the upstream and downstream principle of the oil industry. and CNPC spun off most of its domestic assets into a separate company, PetroChina. On 5 November 2007, HK listed PetroChina was listed as an A-share in the Shanghai Stock Exchange.

Driven by China's increasing energy needs and supported by the government's Go Out policy, CNPC was among the state-owned enterprises which expanded internationally. Because the more accessible oil resources had already been claimed, CNPC and other enterprises entered less politically stable countries with greater political and security risks.

In 2012, a CNPC subsidiary, the Bank of Kunlun, was sanctioned by the United States because of its financial relationship with the Islamic Revolutionary Guard Corps and the Quds Force.

In July 2013, CNPC and Eni signed a $4.2 billion deal to acquire a 20% stake in a Mozambique offshore natural gas block.

In June 2014, the "head of a key China National Petroleum subsidiary was recalled to Beijing" and fell "from public view". Replacement of China National Petroleum's top representative in Canada was announced in July.

In February 2022, CNPC and Russia's Gazprom signed a supply contract for 10 bcm per year through the Far Eastern route.

Following the 2022 Russian invasion of Ukraine the company continued doing business in Russia and was listed on Ukraine's International Sponsors of War along with Sinopec for continuing to pay Russian taxes.

In July 2025, CNPC launch an international communication center to "tell China’s petroleum story well and spread China’s petroleum voice."

== Operations ==
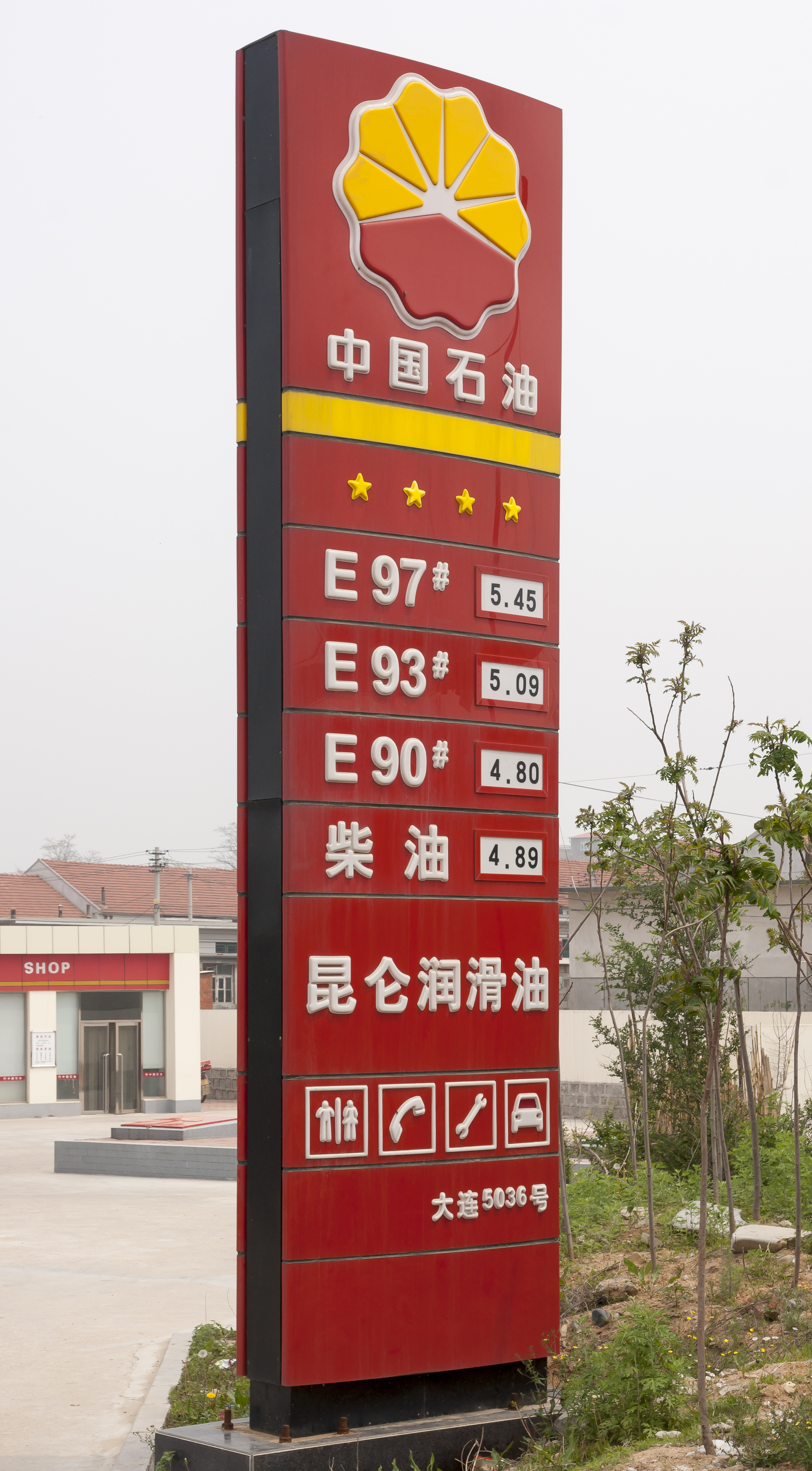
Fuel prices at a PetroChina petrol station in Dalian, Liaoning, China, 2009

CNPC holds proven reserves of 3.7 billion barrels (590,000,000 m^{3}) of oil equivalent. In 2007, CNPC produced 54 billion cubic metres of natural gas. CNPC has 30 international exploration and production projects with operations in Azerbaijan, Canada, Iran, Indonesia, Myanmar, Oman, Peru, Sudan, Niger, Thailand, Turkmenistan, and Venezuela. Many of the company's exploration projects are carried out by the Great Wall Drilling Company (GWDC), a wholly owned drilling services company.

In 2018 the company announced it is building natural gas storage facilities with a total capacity of 55.6 billion cu m in the northern Henan province, to ease supply bottlenecks in the peak winter season. China has accelerated the construction of underground gas storage facilities due to the challenges faced in transporting gas last winter when logistical issues forced buyers to truck LNG thousands of kilometers from import terminals to consumption areas. The country has started an ambitious program to convert large numbers of coal-fired boilers to cleaner natural gas, to curb smog and pollution.

=== Africa ===
CNPC was the first Chinese enterprise to invest in Africa. In 1996, it began developing oil fields previously discovered by Chevron in Sudan, but which Chevron had abandoned due to civil conflict in Sudan.

==== South Sudan ====
The Great Wall Drilling Company, a subsidiary of the China National Petroleum Company, invested $700 million in drilling 57 wells in Sudan over a 3-year period starting in 1997. In 2010, the company was awarded a contract by the Sudanese Petroleum Ministry to build 5 oil rigs for $75.5 million.

After South Sudan's independence in 2011, South Sudan's territory included many of the Sudanese oil fields where CNPC (as well as Sinopec) have significant interests. CNPC is a major investor in South Sudan's oil sector. The company is major stockholder in Petrodar consortiums.

The December 2013 beginning of the South Sudanese Civil War prompted Chinese policymakers to consider whether to relinquish oil fields and other investments or to continue to maintain them during the conflict. Ultimately, a minimum team of Chinese nationals working for CNPC remained to continue oil production. This decision allowed South Sudan's oil sector to continue to operate although CNPC suffered huge losses given high transportation costs and low international oil prices. Continuing oil production helped China to earn trust from the South Sudanese government and support from the international community for its contribution in stabilizing South Sudan's economy.

==== Chad ====
As of 2023, CNPC operates oil fields in Chad with a Swiss company.

==== Mozambique ====
In Mozambique, CNPC owns 20% of two natural gas projects as of 2023.

==== Niger ====
CNPC runs a joint project, called Zinder Refining Co, with Niger's central government to operate the Soraz refinery. It was completed in 2011 after CNPC invested US $980 million. CNPC also runs Agadem oilfield; which is the country's only operational oil field. In 2024, a pipeline was completed to bring Agadem oil to Benin. However, militants stopped the flow of oil causing large financial loses for CNPC.

=== Central Asia ===
==== Afghanistan ====
In December 2011, Afghanistan signed a deal with CNPC for the development of oil blocks in the Amu Darya basin, a project expected to earn billions of dollars over two decades; the deal covered drilling and a refinery in the northern provinces of Sar-e Pol and Faryab and was the first international oil production agreement entered into by the Afghan government for several decades. All CNPC operations were shut down in Afghanistan due to the Taliban takeover.

==== Kazakhstan ====
CNPC is one of the most active Chinese companies in the petroleum sector in Kazakhstan. It is heavily involved in the development of Kazakh oil after the acquisition of Alberta-based PetroKazakhstan, a company with all operations in Kazakhstan. The company was purchased for $4.18 billion. Political resistance in Kazakhstan to the deal was placated by the sale of a minority stake in PetroKazakhstan by CNPC to KazMunaiGaz, the Kazakh state-owned oil company.

In June 2023, CNPC received full support from Samruk-Kazyna for investments in the expansion of Kazakhstan's gas and oil pipeline capacities, as well as the construction of a sour gas processing plant to be located at the Kashagan offshore development site. In addition, CNPC was involved in the upgrade projects at the Shymkent oil refinery. Through the implementation of these projects, China would be able to receive oil produced and then diverted from Kazakhstan. The modernisation of the oil refinery in Shymkent was completed in August 2023.

Pakistan

Great Wall Drilling Corporations (GWDC) was operating in Pakistan until 2008. In 2008, all of GWDC operations and assets in Pakistan were acquired by Chuanqing Drilling Engineering Company Limited (CCDC) another subsidiary of CNPC.

==== Uzbekistan ====
In 2006, CNPC formed an international consortium with state-run Uzbekneftegaz, LUKoil Overseas, Petronas, and Korea National Oil Corporation to explore and develop oil and gas fields in the Aral Sea.

=== East Asia ===
==== China ====
In October 2004, CNPC began construction of a pipeline from the Middle East to Xinjiang province.

In June 2023, QatarEnergy signed a 27- year deal with CNPC for 4 million metric tons of LNG to be delivered yearly. This is the second agreement that Qatar has made with a Chinese company in less than a year. In November 2022, Sinopec and QatarEnergy made a similar deal. Both CNPC and Sinopec also have an equity stake in the Qatar North Field eastern expansion which amounts to about 5% of an LNG train of 8 million metric tons of year.

CNPC announced that it would begin a 457-day drilling project in the Taklimakan Desert in June 2023 to drill down to the Earth's core, 10,000 metres deep, for scientific purposes and to search for oil and gas. In August 2023, CNPC also began ultra-deepwater exploration drilling in search for oil and gas to slowly enable China to rely less on foreign oil.

=== Europe ===
==== Russia ====
In May 2014, a 30-year deal between Russia's Gazprom and China National Petroleum Corporation (CNPC) which was 10 years in the making was estimated worth $400 billion. The agreement was signed at a summit in Shanghai and is expected to deliver some 38 billion cubic meters of natural gas a year, starting around 2018, to China's burgeoning economy.

=== Oceania ===
==== New Zealand ====
CNPC operated in New Zealand as CCDC (NZ) Drilling and had one drilling rig, a triple stand DC rig named Rig 43. CCDC NZ started workover/drilling operations in the Kapuni gas fields of South Taranaki New Zealand in late 2012 for "tight gas". The rig completed the Kapuni drilling campaign of 4 wells for STOS (Shell Todd Oil Services) in August 2013. Its next drilling project commenced August 2013 for Tag Oil with one well successfully drilled at Cheal C of a depth of just under 5,000m. The rig was then stood down pending appeals for the next stage of a drilling campaign for Tag Oil in March 2014. Due to the periods involved it was decided to end its drilling campaign in New Zealand. Rig 43 was then dismantled and shipped to other overseas locations and no longer operates in New Zealand.

=== South and Southeast Asia ===
==== Malaysia ====
China Petroleum Pipeline Engineering, a unit of CNPC, was the primary contractor working to establish two pipelines in Malaysia. The project was accused of involvement in corruption and was suspended by the Pakatan Harapan seventh cabinet of Malaysian Prime Minister Mahathir Mohamed in 2018. The company denied the allegations. In July 2019, Malaysian authorities seized $243.5M from China Petroleum Pipeline Engineering to compensate for the paid for but unfinished pipelines and transferred to a Malaysian government-owned business.

==== Sri Lanka ====
CNPC's subsidiary China Huanqiu Contracting & Engineering Corporation has been doing business in Sri Lanka since 1997. It became one of the first companies involved in the Hambantota International Port project when it began work on refueling facilities and oil tank projects following a 2005 agreement between Sri Lanka and China to facilitate the involvement of Chinese companies in the port development.

=== West Asia ===
==== Iraq ====
In March 2009, CNPC began development of Ahdab, an oil field in Wasit Governorate holding a modest one billion barrels, becoming "the first significant foreign investors" in Iraq. The contract is a renegotiated version of a 1997 agreement between China and Iraq under Saddam Hussein. The project progressed despite security problems with local farmers. Dozens of farmers complained of damage to property because of work on the site and Iraqi oil officials claimed thievery from the oil site by local farmers. Ahdab is not expected to be a major profit center, earning the company a projected 1 percent profit, but the field was seen as an entry strategy into Iraq.

Following Ahdab, CNPC obtained a production contract during the 2009/2010 Iraqi oil services contracts tender to develop the much larger "Rumaila field" with joint venture partner BP, which contains an estimated 17.8 billion barrels (2.83×10^{9} m^{3}) of oil. It is expected that crude oil production from Rumaila will expand by 10% by the end of 2010 once the BP PLC/CNPC consortium takes over development of the field in June 2010. A contract was also awarded to a consortium led by CNPC (37.5%), including TotalEnergies (18.75%) and Petronas (18.75%) for the "Halfaya field" in the south of Iraq, which contains an estimated 4.1 billion barrels (650,000,000 m^{3}) of oil.

In August 2023, CNPC Daqing Drilling Engineering Co was awarded an EPC to drill wells with two rigs located in the Rumaila oilfield in Iraq. The engineering, procurement and construction contract is said to be worth $194 million and the number of wells allowed to be drilled were not disclosed.

CNPC took over the West Qurna 1 oilfield in January 2024 from ExxonMobil. The oilfield is located Northwest of Basra and produces over 25 million tonnes of crude oil annually.

==== Iran ====
CNPC became increasingly involved in the development of Iranian oil fields following international sanctions that targeted the Iranian oil and gas sectors leading many European energy companies such as Shell Oil, Repsol, etc. to shut down operations in Iran. The CNPC along with Sinopec has been involved in various projects relating to Iran's oil/gas development. As of 2011, CNPC has been developing Iran's age-old Masjed Soleyman Oil Field, the oldest oil field of the Middle East, together with Iranian counterpart NIOC in a deal worth 200 million dollars. Production from this particular oil field was expected to increase in 2011 from 2,500 barrels (400 m^{3}) a day to 25,000 barrels (4,000 m^{3}) after the completion of the first phase, and to 55,000,000 bbl/d (8,700,000 m^{3}/d) following the completion of phase 2 of the project.

In August 2018, TotalEnergies officially withdrew from the Iranian South Pars gas field because of sanctions pressure from the US, leaving CNPC to take up their 50.1% stake in the $5 billion natural gas field, of which it had already 30%. It held this 80.1% share until it withdrew its investment in October 2019 due to the US sanctions on Iran, according to Oil Minister Bijan Zangeneh quoted by the SHANA news agency.

==== Syria ====
CNPC with Indian state oil firm, ONGC created a joint venture to acquire minority stakes ranging from about 33.3% to 39% in several mature Syrian oil and natural gas properties. The combined entity was a notable instance of cooperation between two state oil firms that regularly competed for assets around the world.

==== Qatar ====
In June 2023, CNPC signed a 27-year deal with QatarEnergy for 4 million metric tons of LNG to be delivered yearly. CNPC also has an equity stake in the Qatar North Field eastern expansion which amounts to about 5% of an LNG train of 8 million metric tons of year.

== Controversies ==
=== Corruption allegations ===
In September 2013, Jiang Jiemin, a former chairman of PetroChina, a subsidiary of CNPC, was abruptly removed from his role as director of the State-owned Assets Supervision and Administration Commission of the State Council and investigated for corruption and abuse of power, along with four other senior oil executives. Jiang was considered an ally of corrupt former security chief Zhou Yongkang, and part of a group of officials that had political ties with Zhou. On October 12, 2015, the court found Jiang guilty on all counts, including accepting bribes, possessing dark assets, and abusing his power. He was sentenced to 16 years in prison.

In January 2017, former PetroChina vice chairman Liao Yongyuan was sentenced to 15 years in prison for abuse of power and accepting nearly $2 million worth of bribes.

In October 2021, the Central Commission for Discipline Inspection announced that it was investigating former PetroChina vice president Ling Xiao, for "serious disciplinary violations."

=== Lanzhou Petrochemical contamination ===
In 2014, Lanzhou Petrochemical, a subsidiary of CNPC, was responsible for ethylene and ammonia leaks, benzene contamination of water supplies, and air pollution in Lanzhou. City officials criticized the company and demanded an apology.

=== 2003: Chongqing deadly gas leakage ===
On 23 December 2003, a gas blowout occurred at the Luojia No. 16H gas well. The toxic fumes killed 243 people and hospitalized substantially more. Specialists concluded that the accident was the result of negligence on the part of Eastern Sichuan Drilling Company, which was working under China National Petroleum Corporation. They concluded that Sichuan technicians had failed to fix a blowout-prevention valve, a basic safety measure, that the gas well was built too close to homes, that workers failed to promptly inform authorities, that workers neglected to ignite the gas to prevent disaster, and that the company had not undergone an official environmental and safety assessment before commencing operations. On March 25, 2006, another leak in the Luojia No. 2 gas well in Chongqing required the evacuation of 15,000 people. Three attempts were required to properly seal the leak.

=== Suspension of operations in Chad ===
In August 2013, the operations of a CNPC subsidiary in Chad were suspended entirely by the country's government after it had violated environmental standards while drilling for crude oil in the south of the country. "We found flagrant violations of environmental standards by the company ... CNPC's behavior was unacceptable," said Le Bemadjiel, Chad's minister of oil. The minister also claimed that CNPC discharged oil intentionally to reduce costs, did not have facilities to clean spilled crude oil, dumped crude oil without safeguards, and asked locals to help remove crude oil without providing them with appropriate protective gear.

In March 2014, Chad fined CNPC worth a total of $1.2 billion. In August 2014, CNPC had five of its permits revoked after failing to pay the fine. In October 2014, CNPC agreed to pay $400 million.

=== Jilin chemical plant explosion ===
In November 2005, chemical plants belonging to PetroChina, a subsidiary of CNPC, exploded in Jilin, China, resulting in 100 tons of benzene, which is a carcinogen and toxic, pouring into the Songhua River. There was a slick of chemicals that spanned 80 kilometres. Harbin, another city along the Songhua River, had to cut the water supply from almost 4 million people, for 5 days. More than 60 people were injured, five died, and one person was missing due to the incident. The spill reached as far as Khabarovsk, Russia, where residents stocked up on bottled water. The Russian city tried filtering its water of toxic substances, but couldn't guarantee the water was safe. China's environmental agency fined the company one million yuan (approximately $125,000, £64,000) for its pollution, which was the maximum fine that can be handed out in China for breaking an environmental law. The Chinese government said that cleaning up the aftermath would require one billion US dollars. Li Zhaoxing, Chinese Foreign Minister at the time, issued a public apology to Russia due to the incident. The Chinese press responded harshly to the authorities' response to the disaster. Another gas pipeline exploded on 20 January 2006 in Sichuan. Reportedly, nine were killed and nearly 40 injured.

=== Oil spills ===
In January 2010, it was revealed that a CNPC diesel pipeline had burst near the confluence of the Chishui and Weihe rivers, in Huaxian County, Shaanxi. The extensive pollution ended up in the Yellow River, China's longest waterway.

In July 2010, two pipelines exploded at an oil storage depot belonging to China National Petroleum Corp near Dalian's Xingang Harbour in Liaoning province which spilled an estimated 1,500 tonnes of crude into the sea. Two thousand firefighters took fifteen hours to subdue the fire and the spill reached a size of 180 km^{2} (69 sq mi).

=== Trade anomalies ===
On January 19, 2022, Chinese authorities punished CNPC's subsidiary "PetroChina Fuel Oil Co Ltd" for alleged oil trade inconsistencies that "severely disrupted oil products market order... facilitated blind development of outdated production capacity at independent refineries...caused losses in government tax revenue indirectly," said the National Development and Reform Commission.

=== Human rights ===
In 2011, Earthrights International accused PetroChina, a subsidiary of CNPC, of complicity in serious human rights abuses in Burma, a country known for militarily furthering its economic interests through the use of forced labor.

=== Tax issues ===
In January 2014, the International Consortium of Investigative Journalists published research based on leaked financial records from the British Virgin Islands, implicating CNPC, PetroChina, Sinopec, and CNOOC in offshore tax evasion.

== See also ==
- List of oil spills
- CNPC (HK)
- Natural Gas Industry
- Petroleum industry in China
