= Petroleum industry in China =

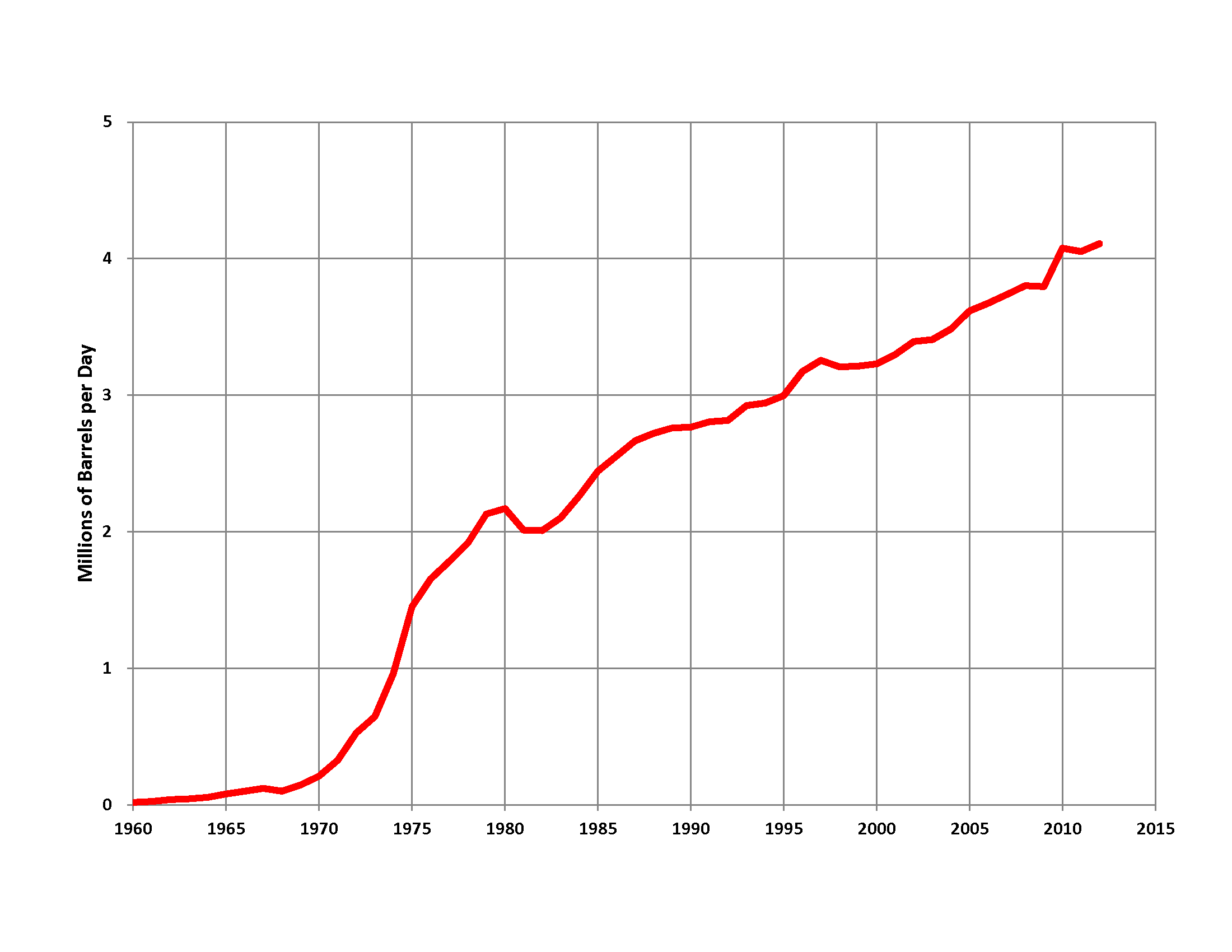
Chinese oil production from 1960 to 2015

The petroleum industry in China has evolved from small-scale exploration during the Qing dynasty to one of the largest in the world since the founding of the People's Republic of China. Domestic oil production began in earnest in the 1950s, with major discoveries such as the Daqing and Shengli oil fields transforming the country into a net oil exporter by the 1970s. However, rising domestic demand led China to become a net oil importer by 1993 and the world's largest oil importer by 2013. To safeguard its energy security, China has developed a large "Strategic Petroleum Reserve" and expanded foreign oil investments through state-owned enterprises. Oil remains a critical component of China's energy policy, economic planning, and geopolitical strategy.

== History ==
=== Early history ===
The late Qing dynasty banned mining because of the traditional cosmological beliefs which regarded the land as a sacred legacy. This ban was lifted during the modernization effort of the Self-Strengthening Movement as the Qing dynasty sought to develop a modern navy and modern industry. In 1875, the court designated Cizhou (in what is now Hebei province) and Taiwan as testing grounds for oil extraction. Qing attempts at oil exploration were hampered by corruption, low efficiency, and lack of sufficient domestic investment capacity for oil extraction and transportation. The Qing court was also concerned about foreign investment and the perceived risk of selling the country to foreigners.

=== Nationalist Era ===
In the 1930s, gasoline replaced kerosene as China's most important petroleum product. China relied on imports through the global oil companies Standard Oil (and its successor, Socony), Asiatic Petroleum Company, and Texaco. Imports were stored at China's treaty ports and delivered elsewhere by ship, mainly via the Yangzi river.

In 1949, the Yumen Oil Field was the only domestic oil field able to support industrial production and it fell far short of China's oil needs. After the Nationalists' defeat in the Chinese Civil War, the oil field was transferred by the Republic of China's National Resources Commission (NRC) to the newly founded People's Republic of China. Most of the NRC's geologists and engineers remained in mainland China and worked for the PRC.

=== Early PRC ===
Ensuring an adequate energy supply to sustain economic growth has been a core concern of the Chinese government since 1949.

China's first five-year plan emphasized industrial development, including nationwide geological prospecting and surveys to support that development. These prospecting efforts were led by the Ministry of Geology and the Ministry of the Petroleum Industry. On August 1, 1952, a division of the People's Liberation Army (PLA) was turned into China's first petroleum army and its eight thousand soldiers became the core workforce for petroleum exploration, construction, and drilling.

Using primarily resources from the Yumen Oil Field and Tsinghua University, the Beijing Oil Institute was founded on October 1, 1953.

In 1956, a rail link was built to Lanzhou; until then, the oil was transported out by truck. A pipeline was constructed in 1957. The Yumen refinery was enlarged and modernized, and by the late 1960s it was reported that production from that area was "about two million tons".

In 1959, large reserves were discovered in the Songhua Jiang-Liao basin in northeast China, and later several other giant oilfields were found. The most important is the Daqing oil field in Heilongjiang that has been the backbone of Chinese oil production for many decades. The Shengli Oil Field began production in 1968 and became the second largest oil field after Daqing. Many of China's other major oil deposits were also discovered during the 1950s and 1960s, and these early PRC prospecting efforts led to an independent oil industry by the time the 1960s ended.

The first two years of the Cultural Revolution disrupted oil production and led to a major oil shortage in 1967. Daqing was one of the first places to have order restored by the military, when in March 1967, the PLA restored order there in March 1967 so that production could proceed.

=== Export era ===
In the late 1960s and the early 1970s, oil prospecting increased throughout the country, and new fields were discovered in central China and northern China. Beginning in 1968 and continuing through 1978, China's crude oil production rose sharply at an annual growth rate of 20%, and China became a net oil exporter.

Following the outbreak of the 1973 Arab-Israeli War, oil prices rose dramatically globally. Among the industrialized countries, Japan was hit hardest by the resulting oil crisis because its petroleum needs were filled completely by imports. It bought large amounts of Chinese oil. China had also obtained commodity-backed loans from Japan to develop the Daqing oil field, and China repaid the loans with oil.

Beginning in 1979 (and running through 1997), the Japan Bank for International Cooperation provided China with resource loans for several oil and coal development projects. These loans totaled $140 billion.

=== Import era ===
By 1993, internal demand for oil exceeded domestic production, and China became a net oil importer. China became dependent on imported oil for the first time in its history in 1993 due to demand rising faster than domestic production. In 2006, it imported 145 million tons of crude oil, accounting for 47% of its total oil consumption. In 2013, the pace of China's economic growth exceeded the domestic oil capacity and floods damaged the nation's oil fields in the middle of the year. Consequently, China imported oil to compensate for the supply reduction and surpassed the US in September 2013 to become the world's largest importer of oil. In 2017, it became the largest importer of US oil. By 2025, China gets a third of its oil via the Strait of Hormuz.

=== Energy transition ===
To mitigate economic shocks related to petroleum, China invested heavily in domestic oil production, becoming one of the top oil producers in the 2020s. The country also built the world's largest strategic petroleum reserve by the 2020s, with a two-part system consisting of a government-controlled strategic reserve complemented by mandated commercial reserves. China's ability to weather global oil shock was first displayed when the country insulated itself significantly from the 2026 Iran war and ensuing fuel crisis. The robust reserve ensured domestic supplies, with the growing renewable energy sector and electric vehicle industry reducing the demand for petroleum products.

== Domestic production ==
Chinese oil reserves as of 2009

China's land-based oil resources are mostly concentrated in the country's north. Large oil fields include Daqing, Shengli, Liaohe, Karamay, and Dagang.

China's proven oil reserves per capita are low.

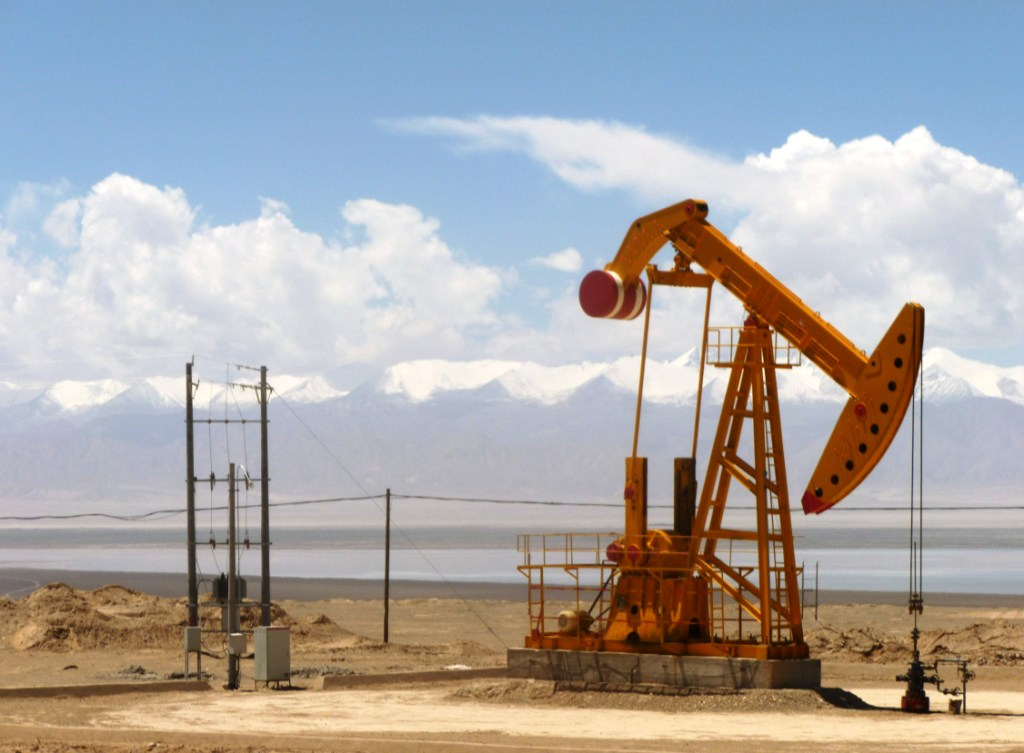
Oil well in Qaidam Basin, Qinghai Province

Province started producing in 1960, and by 1963 was producing nearly 2.3 million tons of oil. Production from Daqing declined, but in 1965, oil fields in Shengli, Shandong, Dagang, and Tianjin yielded enough oil to nearly eliminate the need for importing crude oil. In 2002, annual crude petroleum production was 1,298,000,000 barrels, and annual crude petroleum consumption was 1,670,000,000 barrels.

As of 2018, China ranks seventh for oil production and second in crude oil consumption in the world. China became the world's largest oil importer in 2013.

=== Oil drilling platforms ===
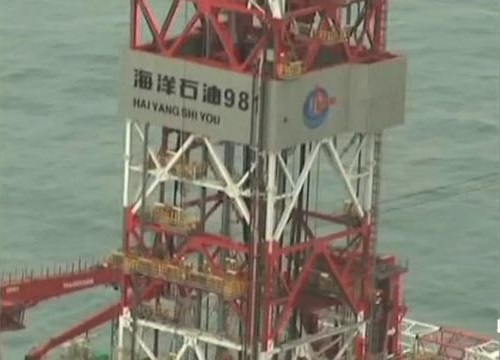
Haiyang Shiyou 981 in contested waters

The largest oil field in the South China Sea, the Liuhua 11-1 field – located 210 km southeast of Hong Kong in the Pearl River Mouth Basin offshore south China, was discovered by Amoco (now BP) in January 1987 in typhoon alley. Water depth, the presence of heavy oil and a "very strong bottom-water drive" were among the technical challenges that had to be resolved before the oil could be extracted. Amoco and Nanhai East engineering teams experimented with offshore drilling techniques, floating production, storage and off-loading system (FPSO) that would have drilling and production support. By 2008, the FPSO had equipment capable of handling 65,000 bbl of oil and 300,000 bbl of total fluids per day and it would be loaded and shipped by shuttle tankers.

In 2010, oil blocks in Wushi oil field (off Zhanjiang, near Hainan) began to be auctioned to foreign companies, with CNOOC having the option to increase its stake to 51% whenever required.

China's $1 billion oil drilling rig, the Haiyang Shiyou 981 – owned and operated by the China National Offshore Oil Corporation – in the South China Sea, Ocean Oil 981 – began its first drilling operations in 2012. It led to protests and hence had to be shifted back.

== Foreign production ==
This shift to dependence on foreign oil has changed the exploration and acquisition policies of China. China's oil need overwhelmed its internal capabilities.

China National Offshore Oil Corp, China National Petroleum Corp, and Sinopec have largely invested in exploration and development in countries that had oil fields but do not have funds or technology to develop them. In 2004 CNOOC signed a deal to extract a million barrels of oil a day in Indonesia as well as other projects with Australia.

=== Foreign acquisitions ===
By 2008, China owned less than 1 percent of the oil company BP, worth about $1.97 billion.

== Energy security ==
=== Strategic Petroleum Reserve ===
China has one of the world's largest global strategic petroleum reserves (GSPR), which is held for national security during an energy crisis. As of 2026, the combined state and industry reserve holds around a billion barrels.

By 2004, China was investing in its first national oil reserve base to avoid foreign dependence. There are three different provinces in which they are focusing. The first, Zhoushan, Zhejiang Province, was built by Sinopec, China's largest oil refining company. The storage space is 5.2 million cubic meters, says the National Development and Reform Commission. Zhejiang was originally a commercial oil transfer base. Its coastal position makes it convenient for movement purposes, although it is at the same time vulnerable to offshore violence. The next reserve of interest is in Huangdao or Qingdao, Shandong Province and the final Dalian, Liaoning Province. All of these reserves are coastal, and with their creation comes vulnerability to possible coastal attacks. In 2007, United Press International journalist questioned energy security, as all three of the stock oil bases were within range of Taiwanese cruise missile attacks.

According to a 2007 article by the state-owned China News Service, at that time China's expanded reserve would include both mandated commercial reserves and state-controlled reserves and would be implemented in three stages to be completed by 2011. The state-controlled reserves phase one consisted of a 101,900,000 barrels (16,200,000 m^{3}) reserve to be completed by the end of 2008. The second phase of the government-controlled reserves with an additional 170,000,000 barrels (27,000,000 m^{3}) was to be completed by 2011. In 2009 Zhang Guobao, head of the National Energy Administration, announced the third phase that would expand reserves by 204,000,000 barrels (32,400,000 m^{3}) with the goal of increasing China's SPR to 90 days of supply by 2020.

The planned state reserves of 475,900,000 barrels (75,660,000 m^{3}) together with the planned enterprise reserves of 209,440,000 barrels (33,298,000 m^{3}) will provide around 90 days of consumption or a total of 684,340,000 barrels (108,801,000 m^{3}).

Along with an emphasis on defensive oil stocks, there is a significant push to create an offensive oil acquisition program. In March 2018, as part of a bid to establish its position as an economic superpower, China introduced a new oil benchmark.

=== Transportation ===
In 2004, China had to import 100 million tons of crude oil to supply its energy demand, more than half of which came from the Middle East. China is attempting to secure its future oil share and establish deals with other countries. Chinese Communist Party general secretary Hu Jintao has proposed to build a pipeline from Russian oil fields to support China's markets as well as other billion-dollar arrangements with Russia, Central Asia, and Burma and to diversify its energy sector by seeking imports from other regions of the world and by starting alternative energy programs such as nuclear.

In 2009 China completed its first critical oil pipeline, the Atyrau-Alashankou oil pipeline (Kazakhstan–China oil pipeline) in Central Asia, as part of a larger overall trade expansion with the Central Asian region, which represented a trade volume of over US$50 billion by 2013, up from $1 billion in 2000.

== See also ==
- Climate change in China
- Coal in China
- Natural gas in China
- Renewable energy in China
