= Strategic Petroleum Reserve =

Strategic Petroleum Reserve may refer to:

- Strategic Petroleum Reserve (China)
- Strategic Petroleum Reserve (India)
- Strategic Petroleum Reserve (United States)

== See also ==
- Global strategic petroleum reserves
