= SPR =

SPR can refer to:

== Media and entertainment ==
- Self-Publishing Review, an online book review magazine for independent authors

== Businesses and organizations ==
- Sistema Público de Radiodifusión del Estado Mexicano, a Mexican public broadcaster
- Society for Psychical Research, founded in 1882
- Software Productivity Research, a software benchmarking company
- Former São Paulo Railway Company, Brazil
- Spirit AeroSystems, Wichita, Kansas, US, NYSE symbol
- South Persia Rifles, British-commanded unit 1916-1921
- Suomen Punainen Risti, Finnish Red Cross
- Suruhanjaya Pilihan Raya Malaysia (Election Commission of Malaysia)

== Places ==
- San Pedro Airport, Belize. IATA code
- Second Polish Republic (Polish: II Rzeczpospolita Polska), country in Central and Eastern Europe that existed between 1918 and 1939

== Science and technology ==
=== Computer science ===
- Subtree pruning and regrafting, a method in computational phylogenetics
- Single particle reconstruction (or analysis), image processing techniques for transmission electron microscopy
- Sapphire Rapids, a processor released in 2023
- Second Preimage Resistance

=== Biology and medicine ===
- SPR, a human gene which codes for the enzyme sepiapterin reductase
- Specialist registrar (SpR), physician position in Ireland and formerly UK
- Society for Psychotherapy Research

=== Weapons ===
- FN Special Police Rifle, made by FN-Herstal
- Mk 12 Special Purpose Rifle, US Navy weapon
- Pindad SPR, Indonesian sniper rifle produced by Pindad

=== Other uses in science and technology ===
- Surface plasmon resonance of electrons

== Other uses ==
- Abbreviation of sapper, a military engineer
- Strategic Petroleum Reserve (disambiguation) of various governments
