= HFRR =

Lubrication measurement

principle of the HFRR measurement

HFRR is a measurement for lubrication of Diesel or heating oil and stands for high frequency reciprocating rig. The value is given in μm, lower is better. The measured value is the diameter of the flattening of the ball after the test.

It's important because high pressure injection pumps are only lubricated by the fuel itself. Density and viscosity are not sufficient describing the aptitude of the fuel.

== Examples of values ==
- biodiesel (Europe, Norm EN 14214): ca. 320 μm
- diesel (Europe, Norm DIN EN 590): < 460 μm
- heating oil EL low sulfur (Germany, Norm DIN 51603-1): < 460 μm
- Diesel (USA, Norm ASTM-D975): 550 - 600 μm
