= Strategic reserve =

Supplies held for use after unexpected events

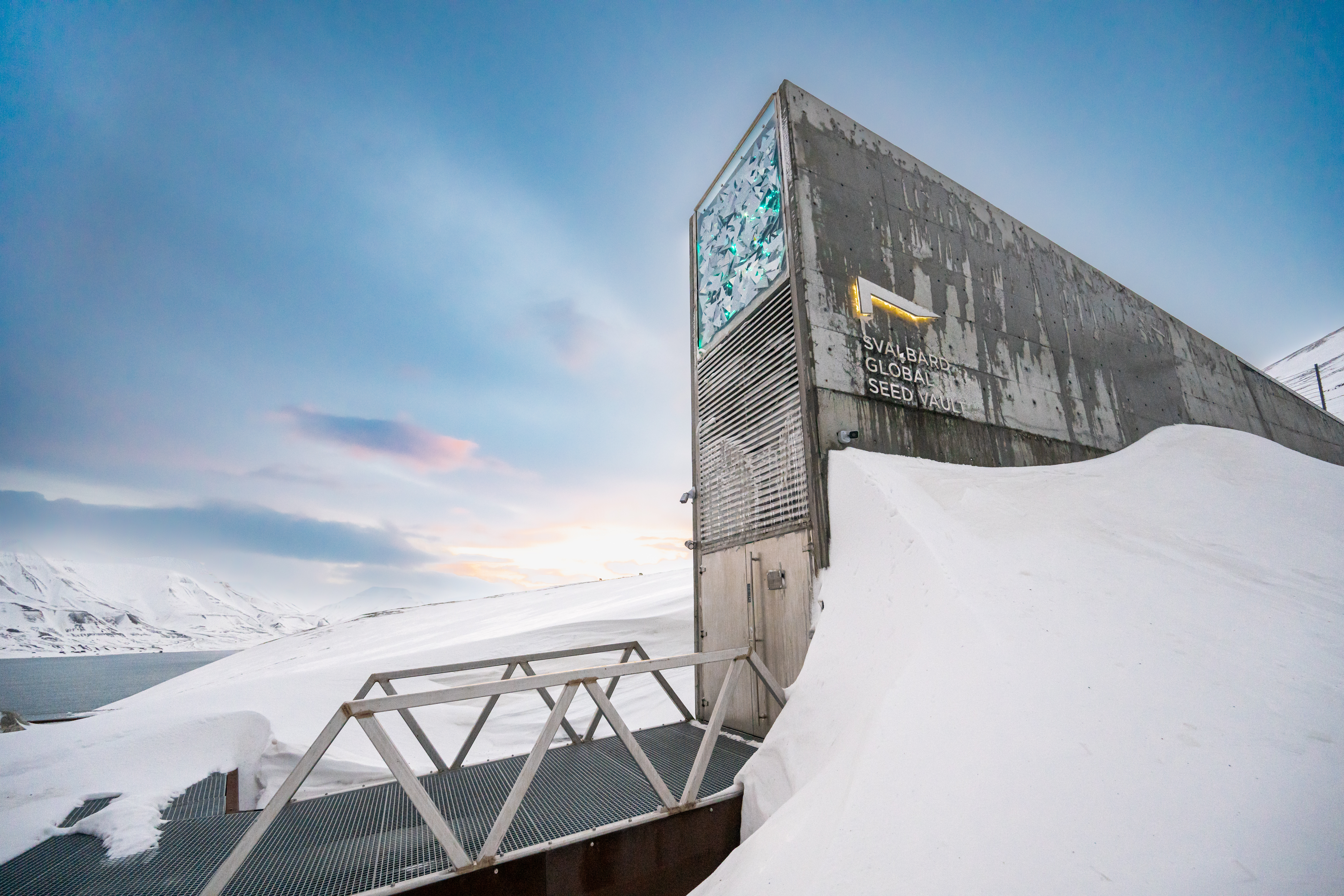
The Svalbard Global Seed Vault protects plants from risk of extinction.

A strategic reserve is the reserve of a commodity or items that is held back from normal use by governments, organisations, or businesses in pursuance of a particular strategy or to cope with unexpected events.

There are several national and international projects aiming to preserve the existing natural wealth and diversity in case of mass extinction or a global catastrophe. The Svalbard Global Seed Vault facility, opened in 2008, focuses on collecting duplicate samples of plant seeds from all around the world and currently contains close to 1 million different agricultural seed samples. The final storage capacity is said to be 4.5 million seed samples. Another such institution, Frozen Ark, concentrates on DNA preservation of endangered animal species for generations.

== Types of strategic reserve ==
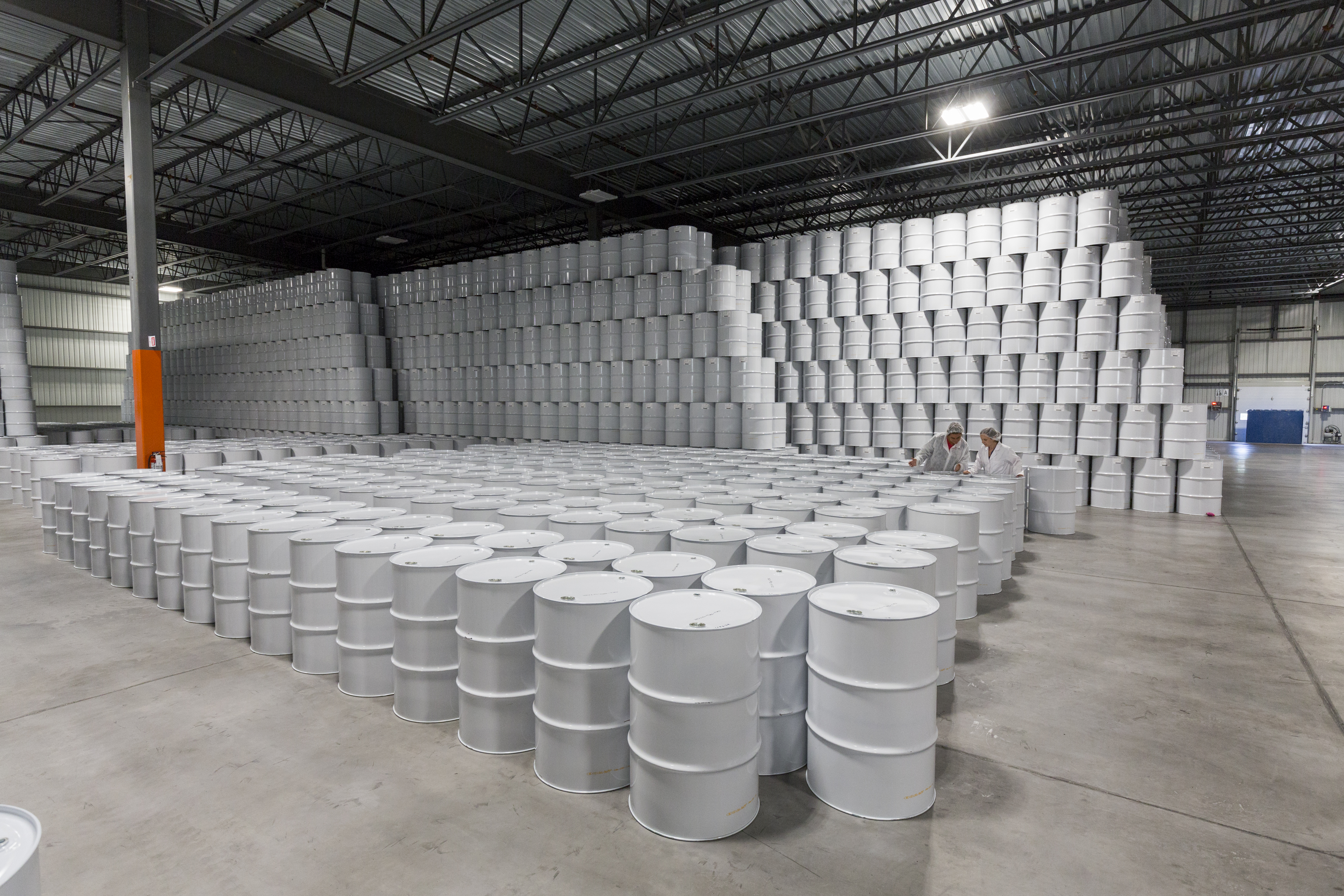
Canada's maple syrup reserve in Laurierville, Québec

A strategic reserve can be:

- Financial in nature such as ring-fenced funding or capital reserves of a large corporation.
- A commodity, such as intervention stocks of food or petrol (see security of supply and strategic petroleum reserves)
- Specific machinery, such as railroad cars or steam locomotives, to be used in an emergency situation.

Examples of commodity reserves:

- Global strategic petroleum reserves
  - Northeast Home Heating Oil Reserve
- Strategic uranium reserves
- National Helium Reserve
- Strategic grain reserve
- Gold reserve
- International Strategic Reserve of the Federation of Quebec Maple Syrup Producers
- Strategic National Stockpile – medical supplies in the U.S.
- Strategic Technology Reserve – held by the states of Alabama, Illinois, New Jersey and North Carolina

Certain countries create their own unusual strategic reserves of food or commodities they value the most, such as cotton, butter, pork, raisins or even maple syrup.

=== Energy strategic reserves ===
"Strategic reserve is a volume-based capacity mechanism in which a centrally established capacity is kept outside of the electricity market and is only used if the market participants do not offer enough generation to meet short-term demand."

Strategic reserve can be also applied as an economic instrument in order to stabilize investments in a specific industry and provide sufficient investment incentive as described in the following example. This time the strategic reserve is defined as a set of power plants or interruptible demand contracts, all controlled by the TSO (transmission system operator), that can be used during temporary lack electricity. The strategic reserve does not necessarily mean a change of available generation capacity, the TSO only takes the control over certain power plants or even averts some power stations from being decommissioned. The activation of such a strategic reserve due to shortage of generation volume at prices above the variable costs of the generation units can lead to a rise of the average electricity price and therefore spark more investments into the generation capacity sector, the main market purpose of the strategic reserve here consists of securing a corresponding investment incentive. One of the main European TSO's is a Belgian company Elia, that operates in Belgium and Germany.

== See also ==
- War reserve (disambiguation)
- Civil defense
