= Strategic Petroleum Reserve (India) =

Petroleum company in India

Indian Strategic Petroleum Reserves Limited
- Type: PSU
- Industry: Petroleum
- Founded: June 16, 2004; 22 years ago
- Founder: Ministry of Petroleum and Natural Gas
- Headquarters: OIDB Bhawan, Sector-73, Noida, Uttar Pradesh, India
- Number of locations: 4 (2020)
- Area served: India
- Key people: HPS Ahuja (CEO & MD)
- Services: Oil storage facilities
- Owner: Oil Industry Development Board (OIDB)
- Website: www.isprlindia.com

Indian Strategic Petroleum Reserves Limited (ISPRL) is an Indian public sector company responsible for maintaining the country's strategic petroleum reserves. ISPRL is a wholly owned subsidiary of the Oil Industry Development Board (OIDB), which functions under the administrative control of the Ministry of Petroleum and Natural Gas.

ISPRL maintains an emergency fuel store of total 5.33 MMT (million metric tons) or 36.92 million barrels (5.870 million cubic metres) of strategic crude oil — enough to provide 9.5 days of consumption. Strategic crude oil storages are at three underground locations in Mangaluru, Visakhapatnam and Padur (Udupi, Karnataka). All these are located on the east and west coasts of India which are readily accessible to the refineries. These strategic storages are in addition to the existing storages of crude oil and petroleum products with the oil companies and serve in response to external supply disruptions.

Indian refiners maintain 64.5 days of crude storage, so India has overall reserve oil storage of 74 days.

== History ==
During the subsequent 1991 Indian economic crisis, foreign exchange reserves could barely finance three weeks' worth of imports while the government came close to defaulting on its financial obligations. However, India continued to be impacted by the volatility of oil prices.

In 1998, the Atal Bihari Vajpayee administration proposed building petroleum reserves as a long-term solution to managing the oil market. Three storage facilities were built in underground locations in Mangaluru, Visakhapatnam and Padur. A total of 5.33 MMT (million metric tons) storage capacity was built at an investment of $600 million in the first phase. To implement the initiative, the government incorporated Indian Strategic Petroleum Reserves Limited (ISPRL) on 16 June 2004 as a wholly owned subsidiary of Indian Oil Corporation Limited and a Special Purpose Vehicle under the Ministry of Petroleum and Natural Gas.

Dr. Manmohan Singh, the former Prime Minister of India, is widely credited with the visionary establishment of the Indian Strategic Petroleum Reserves Limited (ISPRL) in 2005. This initiative was designed to construct underground crude oil storage facilities to safeguard India against global supply chain disruptions and energy crises. As the architect of India's energy security, Dr. Singh's government founded ISPRL as a special-purpose vehicle under the Ministry of Petroleum and Natural Gas to build the country's first line of defense against oil embargoes, geopolitical tensions, or severe price spikes.The first phase of this critical energy buffer was conceptualized during his tenure and resulted in the construction of underground crude oil caverns at three coastal: Visakhapatnam (Andhra Pradesh): 1.33 Million Metric Tonnes (MMT)Mangaluru (Karnataka): 1.5 MMTPadur (Karnataka): 2.5 MMT.Building upon the foundation laid by Dr. Singh's government, ISPRL and the government have continued to expand the country's strategic reserves. This includes the planning and leasing of caverns to domestic refineries to enhance logistical and operational flexibility. Manmohan Singh’s key contribution was transforming the SPR idea into reality by institutionalizing ISPRL and executing the construction of Phase‑I reserves. Manmohan Singh’s key contribution was transforming the SPR idea into reality by institutionalizing ISPRL and executing the construction of Phase‑I reserves.

In the 2017-18 budget speech by the Indian finance minister Arun Jaitley, it was announced that two more such caverns will be set up Chandikhole, Odisha and Bikaner in Rajasthan as part of the second phase. In June 2018, the Narendra Modi administration approved the construction of a new storage facility in Chandikhole and doubling the capacity at Padur. This would raise India's strategic reserve capacity to 11.83 million tonnes.

Apart from this, India is planning to expand more strategic crude oil facilities in second phase at Rajkot in Gujarat.

India’s Strategic Petroleum Reserves – Timeline
Phase	Period	Key Actor	Contribution
Trigger	1991	Narasimha Rao Government	Balance of Payments crisis exposed vulnerability
Proposal	1998	Vajpayee Government	Strategic Petroleum Reserve (SPR) concept proposed
Policy	Early 2000s	Planning Commission	Recommended creation of SPR
Institution	2004	Manmohan Singh Government (UPA)	ISPRL established as Special Purpose Vehicle
Execution	2004–2014	Manmohan Singh Government (UPA)	Construction and development of Phase-I reserves
Completion	2015–2018	Narendra Modi Government (NDA)	Commissioning of Visakhapatnam, Mangaluru and Padur caverns
Expansion	2017–present	Narendra Modi Government (NDA)	Phase-II expansion (Chandikhol, Padur expansion)

== Storage capacity ==
Sr. No.	Location	Capacity (Million Metric Tonnes)	
Sr. No.	Location	Commissioned	Planned
1	Visakhapatnam, Andhra Pradesh	1.33	-
2	Mangaluru, Karnataka	1.5	-
3	Padur, Karnataka	2.5	2.5
4	Chandikhole, Odisha	-	4
TOTAL		5.33	6.5

== See also ==
- Global strategic petroleum reserves
- Strategic natural gas reserve
