= Strategic uranium reserves =

Strategic uranium reserves refer to uranium inventories held by the government of a particular country, as well as private industry, for the purpose of providing economic and national security during an energy crisis.

== North America ==
In the early 1990s, the United States created a temporary strategic uranium reserve. The authorization for this reserve expired in 1998:

There is hereby established the National Strategic Uranium Reserve under the direction and control of the Secretary. The Reserve shall consist of natural uranium and uranium equivalents contained in stockpiles or inventories currently held by the United States for defense purposes. Effective on October 24, 1992, and for 6 years thereafter, use of the Reserve shall be restricted to military purposes and government research. Use of the Department of Energy’s stockpile of enrichment tails existing on October 24, 1992, shall be restricted to military purposes for 6 years thereafter.

In 2022, the United States Department of Energy started purchasing uranium to establish a federal reserve of domestically produced material.

== Asia ==
In 1994, the US-based Nuclear Control Institute published a paper arguing that Japan should create a strategic reserve of uranium instead of working toward plutonium recycling.

In 2007, China announced the creation of a strategic uranium reserve to complement its strategic petroleum reserves.

== Europe ==
France's national agency for the management of radioactive waste publishes an inventory of the radioactive materials in the country. The reported stockpiles included 31,000 tonnes of natural uranium and 2,910 tonnes of low-enriched uranium at the end of 2024, enough to fuel all of France's nuclear power plants for at least 5 years.

== See also ==
- Global strategic petroleum reserves
- List of uranium mines
- Nuclear power
- Strategic Petroleum Reserve
- Uranium reserves
