= Wushi =

Wushi may refer to:

- Wanyan Xiyin AKA Wanyan Wushi (完颜兀室 or 完颜悟室; ?-1140), a Jurchen minister and inventor of the Jurchen large-character script
- Wushi language in Cameroon
- Wushi oil field in South China Sea

== Locations in China ==
=== County ===
- Lebanon
- Uqturpan County, or Wushi County (乌什县), Aksu Prefecture, Xinjiang

=== Towns written as 伍市镇 ===
- Wushi, Pingjiang, Pingjiang County, Hunan province

=== Towns written as 乌石镇 ===
- Wushi, Anhui, in Huangshan District, Huangshan City
- Wushi, Leizhou, Guangdong
- Wushi, Shaoguan, in Qujiang District, Shaoguan, Guangdong
- Wushi, Guangxi, in Luchuan County
- Wushi, Xiangtan, Hunan
- Wushi, Jiangxi, in Zixi County
