= Strategic natural gas reserve =

Government-funded natural gas storage facility

A strategic natural gas reserve is a government funded natural gas storage facility that holds long-term stockpiles of natural gas as compressed natural gas or liquefied natural gas in case of an emergency. After the 2021–2023 global energy crisis, there have been several countries in East Asia and India that have signaled a commitment to building national strategic natural gas reserves, such as Japan, Taiwan, South Korea, and China.

== East Asia ==
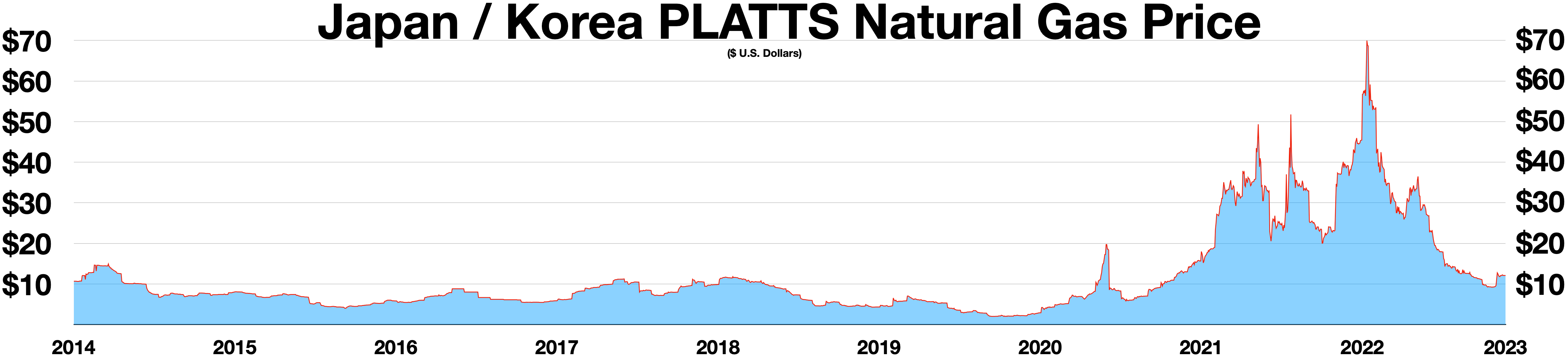
Japan / Korea PLATTS LNG price

The East Asia natural gas commodities tracker is the PLATTS index, which reached as high as $70 per million British thermal units in 2022 during the Russian invasion of Ukraine during the Second Cold War.

=== Taiwan ===
State-owned energy firm CPC Corp holds about 11 days worth of natural gas usage in stockpile and is going to increase it to 14 days.

=== Japan ===
Japan is the world's largest importer of LNG and plans to work with the International Energy Agency to help establish and coordinate a strategic natural gas reserve.

=== South Korea ===
South Korea is the third largest importer of LNG and is building its 6th LNG strategic natural gas reserve facility. It keeps nine days worth of winter usage in strategic storage along with an undisclosed amount of commercial stockpile.

=== China ===
State-owned CNOOC completed 10-billion-cubic-metres (bcm) of storage in 2023, and plans to have 55-60 bcm by 2025 or 13% of total gas consumption for one year.

== India ==
The Petroleum and Natural Gas Regulatory Board in India is putting together a plan as of July 2023 to build strategic natural gas reserves in either abandoned gas wells and underground storage. They currently have no national natural gas reserves.

== United States ==
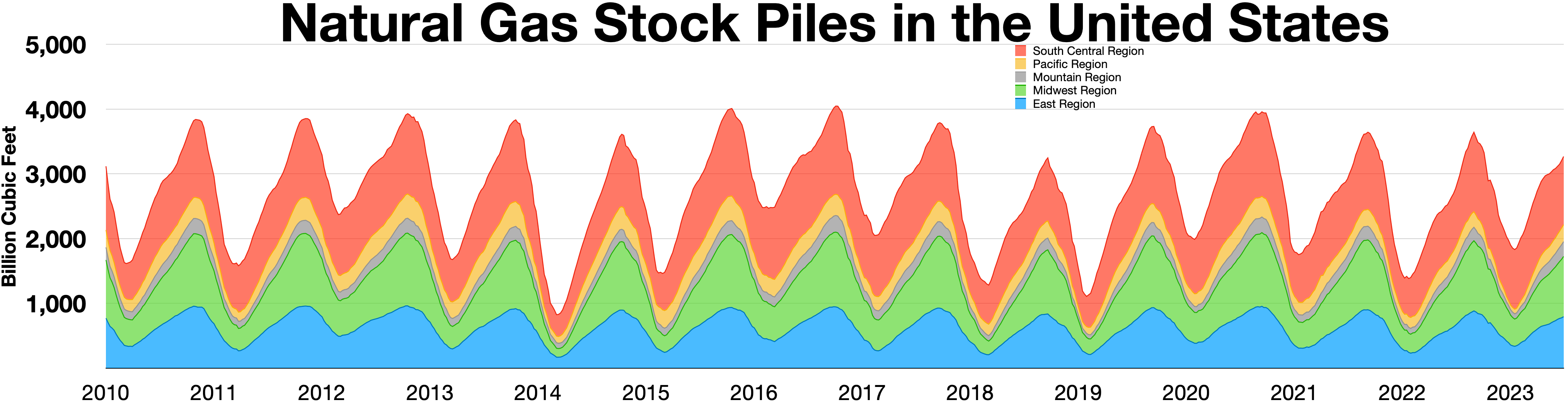
Natural gas commercial stockpiles South Central Region Pacific Region Mountain Region Midwest Region East Region

As of 2023 there are no national strategic natural gas reserve facilities in the United States.

A 2007 study found that as of May 2004, there was roughly 8 trillion cubic feet (Tcf) of commercial gas storage capacity in the US, with about 4 Tcf needed to always remain in storage as base gas. Base gas is needed in order to provide enough pressure for gas to be withdrawn on demand. Therefore, total working storage capacity is about 4 Tcf. This is equal to approximately 17% of annual consumption.

Most gas storage is in depleted gas or oil fields, with the second largest storage capacity being in aquifers, and the smallest in salt caverns. Depleted gas or oil fields are the cheapest to commission, as they take advantage of existing wells, internal distribution systems, and pipeline connections. They are also widely available.

== Europe ==
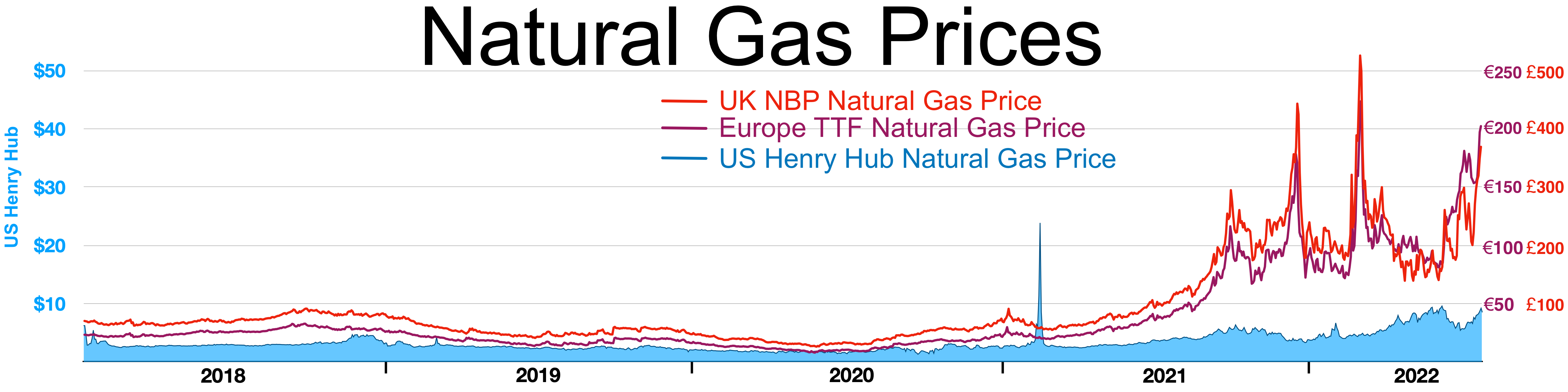
Natural gas prices in Europe and United States, 2018–July 2022 National Balancing Point NBP (UK) natural gas prices Europe TTF natural gas prices United States Henry Hub natural gas prices

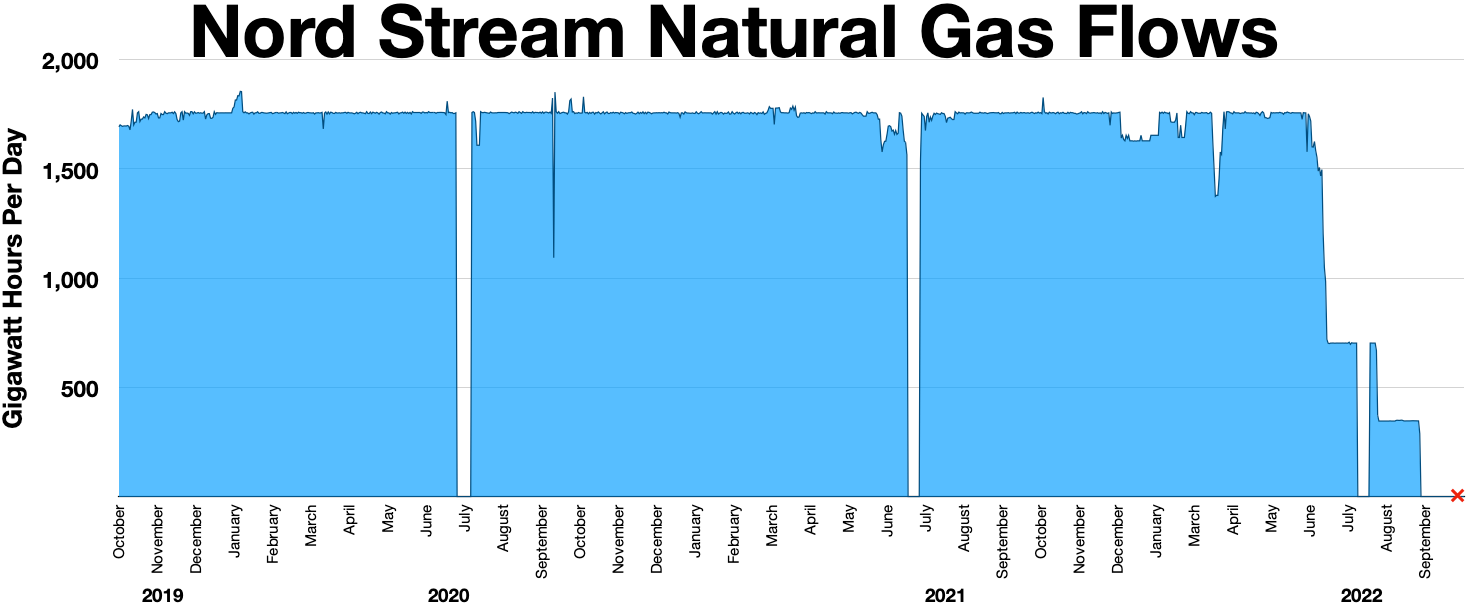
Nord Stream gas flows * Russia cut the flow of natural gas by more than half in June 2022 because they alleged they could not get a part seized by the Canadian government because of sanctions. Siemens, the producer of the part, denied that this piece was critical for operations. * Russia halted gas flows on 11 July 2022 for annual maintenance for 10 days and resumed partial operations on 21 July. * Russia stopped the flow of natural gas on 31 August 2022 for alleged maintenance for 3 days, but later said they could not provide a timeframe for restarting gas flow. The EU accused Russia of fabricating a false story to justify the cut. X Pipeline was sabotaged on 26 September 2022.

The European Commissioner for Energy Kadri Simson plans to green energy transition Europe to renewable energy instead of a strategic natural gas reserve.

== See also ==
- Strategic Petroleum Reserve (United States)
- Strategic petroleum reserve (China)
- Strategic Petroleum Reserve (India)
- Global strategic petroleum reserves
- 2022 Nord Stream pipeline sabotage
- National Helium Reserve
- List of countries by natural gas imports
