= Intervention stocks =

Intervention stocks refers to stocks held by national intervention agencies in the EU as a result of intervention buying of commodities subject to market price support. Intervention stocks may be released onto internal markets if internal prices exceed intervention prices. Otherwise, they may be sold on the world market with the aid of export restitutions under the regulation of commodity-specific Management Committees.
