= Central oil storage =

Central oil storage (COS), or central storage, is the term used for a communal heating system that began to be utilized in the middle of the twentieth century.

The term also applies to industrial, plant and agricultural applications, all of which may or may not be communal in nature.

== Household applications ==
The concept involved using oil (usually kerosene, but sometimes gas oil), in the way that natural gas is used today – it being fed from a central source and metered into individual dwellings on a housing estate. The concept was utilized by major oil companies such as Shell and BP. Each household was obliged to use their oil from their tank, unlike the situation where a consumer owns their own tank obtains their own oil.

The book Introduction to Architectural Science states about liquid fuel storage tanks, "often in a housing development a central storage tank is installed (usually underground) which will be filled by an oil company", and that a supply of liquid fuel is piped to individual apartments or houses from the central storage tank.

=== Logistics ===
Oil would be delivered by road tanker and discharged into a tank capable of holding, for example, 5000 gallons. This oil would then be piped to each home, initially through a master pipeline, which then subdivided underground with a branch leading into each property. Each property was provided with a meter located on an outside wall which was read whenever necessary.

A 5,000-gallon tank would usually be installed on an estate numbering up to 50 or 60 properties, although they ranged from a low of about 12 up to a high of in the thousands. The majority of tanks were situated above ground in an elevated position. This meant the oil could flow into each house under the influence of gravity. Other tanks were situated underground and were equipped with an electric pump, usually feeding oil to a small 'header' tank, again in an elevated position, to allow gravity to then distribute the oil.

The level of oil in the tank would be checked regularly and new supplies ordered when necessary. One potential problem with this system is that it was possible, through negligence, for the tank to run dry, resulting in a number of properties being left with no heat.

From the early 1980s, their owners began to close down COS sites. The significant increases in the price of oil had led many customers to convert to gas, solid fuel, or even to install their own oil tank. With fewer and fewer users per site, and maintenance costs remaining the same, the oil companies went through a closure programme, resulting in few sites still being operational in the new millennium.

As at early 2008, the ownership of many sites is unclear. Sites have been sold through a number of companies which have then been closed down. This presents problems for householders and local authorities alike, for when a site experiences a problem – such as an unsafe bund wall, or even a leak – there is no one to pursue to correct matters.

== Industrial applications ==
Central oil storage is also performed at industrial and plant locations and operations. Central oil storage in industrial applications may be utilized in part to conserve oil, because oil barrels may leak oil.

== See also ==
- Heating oil
- Oil terminal
- Underground storage tank
