= Pearl River Mouth basin =

Sedimentary basin in the South China Sea

The Pearl River Mouth basin (PRMB) is an extensional sedimentary basin located in the northern part of the South China Sea. The basin covers an area of about 175,000 km^{2} where the Pearl River meets the South China Sea near Hong Kong.

== Tectonic setting (South China Sea) ==
The tectonics of the South China Sea are complex. The South China Sea is a marginal sea located where the Eurasian plate, the Indo-Australian plate, and the Philippine Sea plate intersect. Extension began in the Late Cretaceous, along the location of an existing arc. U-Pb dating of arc volcanics from Hong Kong dated the end of magmatic activity around 140 Ma. However, ^{40}Ar/^{39}Ar dating of granites located in the Pearl River Mouth basin showed some magmatic activity continued into the Paleocene. Sea floor spreading then began in the South China Sea around 32 Ma and lasted until around 16 Ma propagating in a southwest direction. Although it is still unclear, two models have been proposed to explain the driving mechanism behind this extension.

=== Extrusion of Indochina ===
One model for extension proposes the opening of the South China Sea to be a result of southeast movement of Indochina and Borneo. This motion, along the Red River fault, is believed to have been instigated by the India/Asia collision. The collision caused an extrusion of Indochina relative to South China, which resulted in crustal extension and sea floor spreading.

=== Subduction under Borneo ===
Another model for extension identifies subduction of the southern margin of the South China Sea under Borneo. In this model, the displacement occurs along a major transform zone oriented north-south. This model also proposes that subduction under the Philippines to the north could have contributed to extension in the South China Sea.

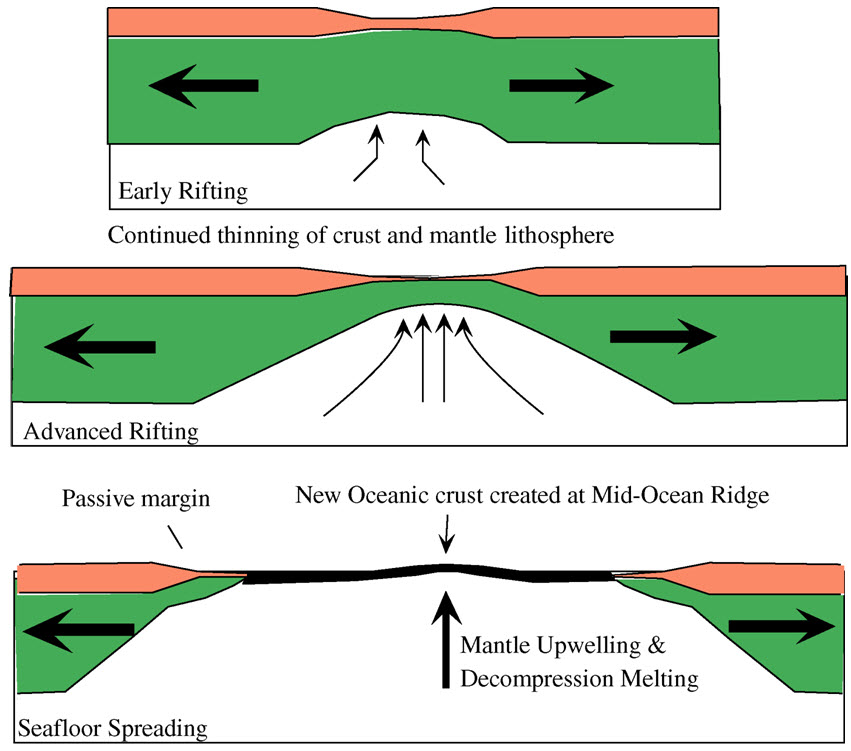
Diagram showing progression from rifting to sea floor spreading

=== Geologic setting (PRMB) ===
The PRMB formed along the continental margin of South China as a result of continental rifting and sea floor spreading in the South China Sea area. The PRMB consists of two areas of depression between three areas of uplift, all running mostly parallel to the spreading axis. Major structures within the PRMB are classified as half-graben, narrow grabens, or wide grabens. Basement rock in the central and northern portions of the PRMB are Cretaceous and Jurassic granites, Mesozoic sedimentary rocks in the east, and Paleozoic quartzite in the west. The crust in the PRMB thins from around 30 km near the coast in the north to around 11 km near the deep basin in the south. The crust also thins rapidly to less than 7 km underneath the Baiyun sag and to less than 9 km underneath the Liwan sag.

=== Sedimentation and stratigraphy ===
==== Syn-rift ====
During rifting from the Late Cretaceous through the Early Oligocene, shallow lacustrine and fluvial to deltaic sediment was deposited in the PRMB. The sandy mudstone of the Shenhu formation was first deposited during the Paleocene and Early Eocene. Gray mudstones make up the Wrenching formation deposited in the Middle Eocene, with coal beds occurring near the top. Alternating layers of lacustrine and sandy mudstones were deposited as the Enping formation during the Late Eocene and Early Oligocene. This formation is capped by the breakup unconformity signifying the transition from syn- to post-rift around 32 Ma.

==== Post-rift ====
Post-rift sedimentation began with transitional sandstones and dark gray mudstones of the Zhuhai formation in the Late Oligocene. The PRMB has experienced deposition of marine sediment with fluctuating sea levels from the Miocene to present day. Today, terrigenous sediment input is mainly provided by the Pearl River, but during the Cenozoic other larger rivers likely contributed to sedimentation as well.

=== Subsidence analysis ===
Wells in the Pearl River Mouth basin have been studied to determine the subsidence history of the basin. Using backstripping methods, three separate rifting episodes were identified within the basin at 45-55 Ma, 45-25 Ma, and about 12-14 Ma with a fourth event at 5 Ma being identified in a single well. Most rifting in the basin was completed by 25 Ma, shortly after the time sea floor spreading began. Extension during rifting events was determined using McKenzie equations. Extension within the basin was determined to be greater than 48% at any given place based on uniform pure shear models and was mostly limited to before 25 Ma. Some extension (3-8%) also occurred after the main rifting phase, coinciding with more rapid sedimentation around 12 Ma.

The presence of magmatism in the PRMB dating as recently as the Late Cretaceous-Early Paleocene indicates that the 80 My necessary to reach equilibrium in a plate following a tectonic or magmatic event had not yet been reached when rifting began in the basin. This timing implies that the lithosphere was hotter and weaker than equilibrium during the opening of the South China Sea and the formation of the PRMB. Forward modeling of the PRMB used elastic thickness (T_{e}) values of 1–3 km to more closely reproduce basin geometries. T_{e} values above 3 km could not produce basin geometries close enough to those observed.

β factors were calculated across cross section lines in the PRMB to represent extension in the basin. One cross section line across the PRMB found β=1.18 for the upper crust and β=1.4 for the entire crust. The differences in these values indicate a low viscosity for the lower crust during breakup. Regionally, β values of the crust were also found to be less than β values of the mantle. These findings indicate that uniform pure shear is not in effect in the PRMB. While some have suggested that the PRMB is on the upper plate in a simple shear model, findings in the conjugate margin, the Dangerous Grounds, also dispute this model.

=== Hydrocarbon exploration ===
The PRMB is a hydrocarbon-rich basin drawing interest from many energy companies, especially the area known as the Baiyun sag. This large depression has been the focus of companies such as the China National Offshore Oil Corporation, which has six natural gas fields located in the area including the Wushi oil field. The Eocene Wrenching and Enping formations have proven to be major source rocks for the area with the dark mudstones deposited during that time. The Oligocene Zhuhai formation also contains good source rocks, as well as reservoir rocks. Fluctuating seas during the Neogene deposited strata forming good reservoirs and caps.
