= War reserve =

The term War reserve may refer to:

- War reserve stock
- War reserve constable
- Another term for Strategic reserve
