= Strategic petroleum reserve (China) =

China's strategic petroleum reserve

The Strategic Petroleum Reserve (SPR; Chinese: 中华人民共和国战略石油储备) is an emergency fuel store of oil maintained by the People's Republic of China National Development and Reform Commission. China does not officially report its volume, but as of 2026, China is estimated to hold the largest emergency reserves in the world, totalling 1.3 billion barrels.

== Background ==
In 2007, China announced an expansion of its crude reserves into a two-part system. Chinese reserves would consist of a government-controlled strategic reserve complemented by mandated commercial reserves. The government-controlled reserves was completed in three phases. Phase one consisted of a 101.9 million barrel reserve, mostly completed by the end of 2008. The second phase of the government-controlled reserves with an additional 170 million barrels for completion by 2011. In 2009, Zhang Guobao the head of the National Energy Administration also stated that there will be a third phase that will expand reserves by 204 million barrels with the goal in 2009 of increasing China's SPR to 90 days of supply by 2020. In January 2026, China has around 130 days of oil suppy in reserve for maximized domestic consumption.

== Reserve structure ==
=== Government reserves in 2025–2026 ===
As of March 2025, the government is estimated to have 401 million barrels stored in above-ground facilities and 668 million barrels in above-ground commercial storage. By December 2025, United States Energy Information Administration estimated Chinese held around 1.4 billion barrels of crude oil in reserve from both government-held and state-owned national oil companies (NOC) inventories, which are both part of the strategic reserves. Outside of the official strategic reserves, Chinese corporate and commercial refineries also have several hundred million barrels of crude oil.

China's large strategic reserve helped the country insulate itself significantly from the 2026 Iran war and ensuing global fuel crisis.

China's strategic petroleum reserve (SPR) remained nearly unchanged between the start of the Iran war and June 2026. To ensure domestic supplies without using strategic reserves, China halted its supplies of refined oil products to other countries, while using corporate stockpiles, outside its official SPR of 1.23 billion barrels, to supply domestic needs. There could also be other previously unreported reserves in China. China's growing renewable energy sector and electric vehicle industry have also reduced the demand for petroleum products. The reduction in demand caused China to cut its oil imports. Analyst estimates from June 2026 differ on how long this can last: while they claim commercial reserves should last past the end of 2026, some also claim overall reserves will be depleted before then. China's paused demand and stockpile of oil has kept the global oil price below market expectations since the war started, with the aim of avoiding a global recession. Analysts have anticipated low imports even shortly after the war's end. The country's future buying decisions are likely to influence the global crude price.

Since the war started, there have been restrictions on overall exports of refined oil products. China has still supplied limited volumes to select partner countries, either due to friendly relations or to secure diplomatic leverage. The conflict has also provided China with an opportunity to expand its renewable energy technologies in Asia.

=== Government reserves in 2016 ===
As of 2016, the Chinese SPR was estimated to hold approximately 400 million barrels in total, out of a capacity of around 500 million barrels.

=== Government reserves in 2009 ===
The government and enterprise reserves are managed by the National Development and Reform Commission (NDRC). Current plans call for government reserves of 475.9 million barrels (101.9 million barrels completed, 374 million barrels planned).

- First phase facilities:
  - Dalian, Liaoning Province. Capacity of 19 million barrels (3,000,000 m^{3}), filled as of September 2009.
  - Qingdao, Shandong Province. Capacity of 19 million barrels (3,000,000 m^{3}), filled as of September 2009.
  - Zhenhai, Zhejiang Province. 52 storage tanks with a capacity of 33 million barrels (5,200,000 m^{3}), filled as of December 2007.
  - Zhoushan, Zhejiang Province. Capacity of 33 million barrels (5,200,000 m^{3}), 7.6 million barrels (1,210,000 m^{3}) filled as of June 2007.
- Second phase facilities:
  - Dushanzi, Karamay City, Xinjiang Uygur Autonomous Region. Planned capacity of 34 million barrels (5,400,000 m^{3}).
  - Lanzhou, Gansu province. Planned capacity of 19 million barrels (3,000,000 m^{3}), with completion by 2011.
  - Huangdao, Shandong Province
  - Jinzhou, Liaoning Province
  - Four other facilities, location and size to be determined.
- Third phase facilities:
  - Wanzhou, Chongqing Municipality
  - Henan Province
  - Caofeidian, Hebei Province
  - Tianjin. Planned capacity of 150 million barrels (20,000,000 m^{3}), with completion by 2023.
- Local government reserves
  - Guangdong Province has begun plans for an expanded reserve from 20 days to 90 days.
  - Hainan Province has begun plans for a reserve.
  - Shanshan, Xinjiang Uygur Autonomous Region has begun plans for a reserve.
  - Caofeidian, Hebei province has begun plans for a reserve.
  - Wanzhou, Chongqing municipality has begun plans for a reserve.

=== Enterprise reserves in 2008 ===
In 2008, the enterprise reserves composed a smaller portion of the overall SPR, with a 209.44 million barrel strategic reserve planned (35.33 million barrels completed, 51.5 million barrels under construction).

- Commercial oil reserves by major Chinese oil companies, PetroChina, Sinopec and CNOOC
  - PetroChina facility, Shanshan County, Xinjiang Uygur Autonomous Region. Completed with a capacity of 6.3 million barrels (1,000,000 m^{3}).
  - PetroChina facility, Tieling, Liaoning Province. Completed with a capacity of 5.03 million barrels (800,000 m^{3}), completion October 2008
  - Sinopec facility, Ningbo, Zhejiang Province. Completed with a capacity of 24 million barrels (3,800,000 m^{3}).
  - Sinopec facility, Rizhao, Shandong Province, under construction. Planned capacity of 20.1 million barrels (3,200,000 m^{3})
  - Sinopec facility, Beihai, Guangxi region, under construction. Planned capacity by 2011 of 20.1 million barrels (3,200,000 m^{3})
  - Sinopec facility, Zhanjiang, under construction
  - Sinopec facility, Caofeidian, under construction
  - Sinopec facility, Shanghai, under construction
  - Sinochem facility, under construction
  - Unknown company, Heilongjiang Province
  - CNOOC facility, Gansu Province, under construction. Planned capacity of 11.3 million barrels (1,800,000 m^{3}).
- Oil storage reserves by medium and small Chinese oil companies

The planned state reserves of 475.9 million barrels plus the planned enterprise reserves of 209.44 million barrels will provide around 90 days of consumption or a total of 685.34 million barrels.

== See also ==
- Strategic Petroleum Reserve (United States)
- Strategic natural gas reserve
- Oil reserves
- Global strategic petroleum reserves
- Energy development
- Energy security
