= Northeast Home Heating Oil Reserve =

American strategic oil reserve

The Northeast Home Heating Oil Reserve was created in July 2000 to provide a reserve of heating oil for the approximately 5.3 million households in the Northeast region of the United States that use heating oil for their homes.

== History ==
On July 10, 2000, President of the United States Bill Clinton directed Energy Secretary Bill Richardson to establish a 2,000,000-US-barrel (63,000,000 US gal; 240,000,000 L) home heating oil component of the Strategic Petroleum Reserve in the Northeast. The intent was to create a buffer large enough to allow commercial companies to compensate for interruptions in supply or severe winter weather, but not so large as to dissuade suppliers from responding to increasing prices as a sign that more supply is needed.

The reserve was opened for the first time in November 2012. 2,000,000 US gallons (7,600,000 L) were made available to local and Federal agencies for relief efforts in the wake of Hurricane Sandy.

== Facilities ==
- Buckeye Partners LP, Port Reading Terminal - Port Reading, NJ
- Buckeye Partners LP, New Haven Terminal - New Haven, CT
- Global Companies LLC, Chelsea Terminals - Chelsea, MA
- Sunoco Midstream, South Portland Terminal - South Portland, ME

== See also ==
- Energy security
- Strategic reserve
