= Heating oil =

Liquid petroleum product used as a fuel oil for furnaces or boilers

Fuels for heating
- Heating oil
- Wood pellet
- Kerosene
- Propane
- Natural gas
- Wood
- Coal

Heating oil is any petroleum product or other oil used for heating; it is a fuel oil. Most commonly, it refers to low viscosity grades of fuel oil used for furnaces or boilers for home heating and in other buildings. Home heating oil is often abbreviated as HHO.

Most heating oil products are chemically very similar to diesel fuel used as motor fuel; motor fuel is typically subject to higher fuel taxes. Many countries add fuel dyes to heating oil, allowing law enforcement to check if a driver is evading fuel taxes. Since 2002, Solvent Yellow 124 has been added as a "Euromarker" in the European Union; untaxed diesel is known as "red diesel" in the United Kingdom.

Heating oil is commonly delivered by tank truck to residential, commercial, and municipal buildings and stored in above-ground storage tanks (ASTs) located in the basements, garages, or outside adjacent to the building. It is sometimes stored in underground storage tanks (USTs) but less often than ASTs. ASTs are used for smaller installations due to the lower cost factor. Heating oil is less commonly used as an industrial fuel or for power generation.

Leaks from tanks and piping are an environmental concern. In the United States, various federal and state regulations are in place regarding the proper transportation, storage and burning of heating oil, which is classified as a hazardous material (HazMat) by federal regulators.

== Technical characteristics ==
Heating oil consists of a mixture of petroleum-derived hydrocarbons in the 14- to 20-carbon atom range that condense between 250 and 350 °C (482 and 662 °F) during oil refining. Heating oil condenses at a lower temperature than petroleum jelly, bitumen, candle wax, and lubricating oil, but at a higher temperature than kerosene, which condenses between 160–250 °C (320–482 °F). The heavy (C20+) hydrocarbons condense between 340–400 °C (644–752 °F).

Heating oil produces 137,500 British thermal units per US gallon (38.3 MJ/L) to 138,700 British thermal units per US gallon (38.7 MJ/L) and weighs 7.2 (7.38) pounds per US gallon (0.95 kg/L). Number 2 fuel oil has a flash point of 52 °C (126 °F).

Historically, the legal difference between diesel and heating oil in the United States has been sulfur allowance. Diesel for machinery and equipment must be below 15 ppm sulfur content while heating oil needed only stay below 500 ppm sulfur. However, most heating oil in the United States is now "ultra-low sulfur heating oil" (ULSHO) and meets the same 15 ppm standard.

== United States and Canada ==
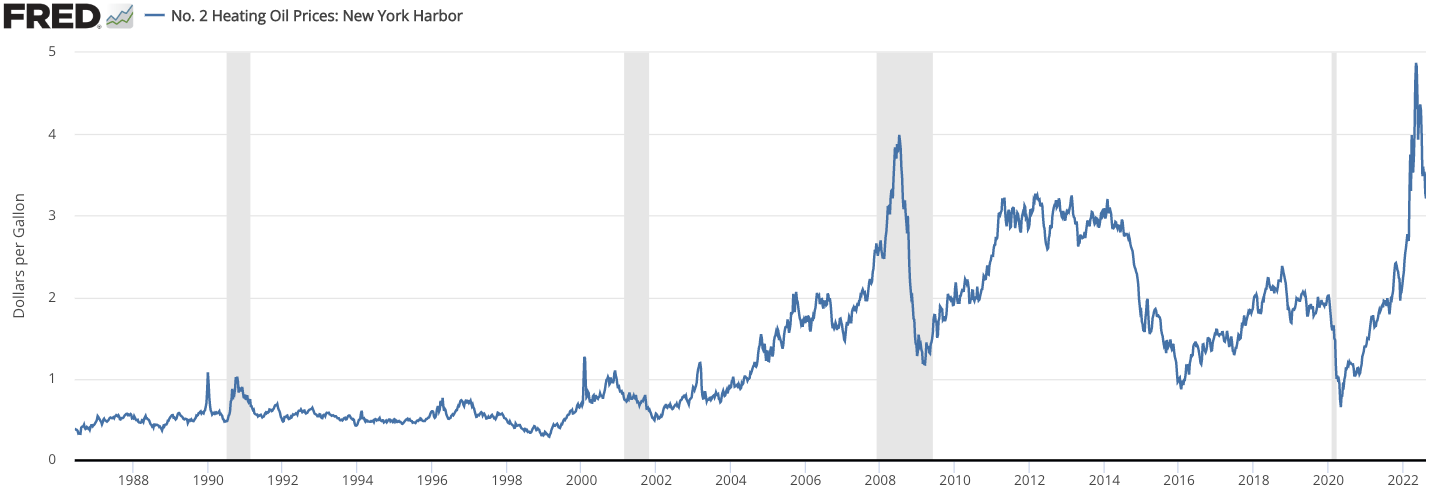
No. 2 heating oil price, 1986–2022

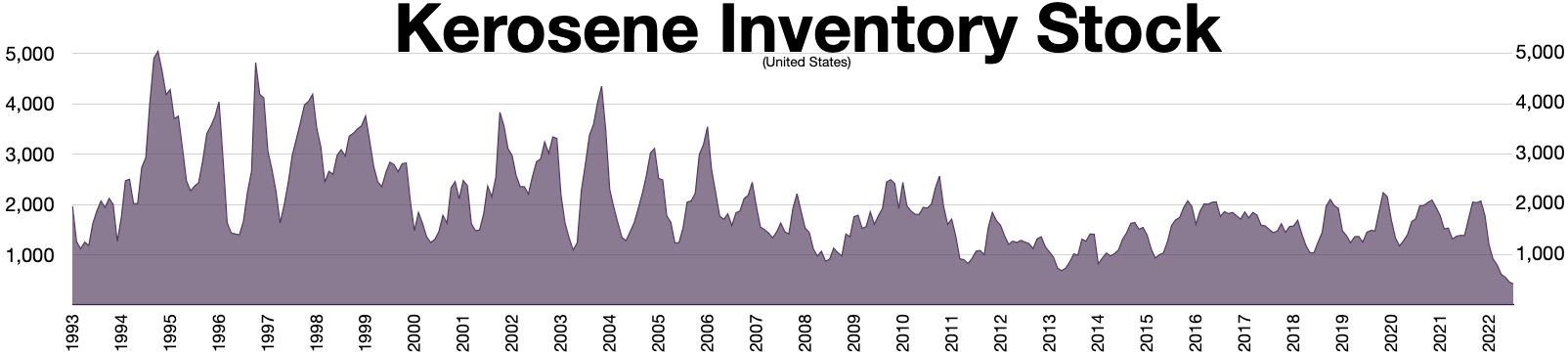
Kerosene inventory stock levels (United States), 1993–2022

Heating oil is known in the United States as No. 2 heating oil. In the U.S., it must conform to ASTM standard D396. Diesel and kerosene, while often confused as being similar or identical, must each conform to their respective ASTM standards. Heating oil is widely used in both the United States and Canada, with U.S. residential use most common in the northeastern states of New York and Pennsylvania and in New England, collectively accounting for 85% of total U.S. residential heating oil use. In the United States, biodiesel blends of B5 (5% biodiesel) and B20 (20% biodiesel) are available in most markets as a lower CO_{2} and cleaner-burning heating fuel.

The heating oil futures contract trades in units of 1,000 barrels (160 m^{3}) with a minimum fluctuation of $0.0001 per US gallon ($0.026/m^{3}) and (for the US) is based on delivery in New York Harbor.

The US Department of Energy tracks the prices homeowners pay for home heating fuel (oil and propane). There are also a number of websites that allow home owners to compare the price they are paying with the Department of Energy data as well as other consumers in their area. Likewise the US Energy Information Administration collects heating oil price statistics and maintains historical price data for all major US markets during each heating season. The Department of Energy also supports research and development for heating oil technology through the US National Oilheat Research Alliance. Additional information about biodiesel heating oil use can also be found at the US National Biodiesel Board's site.

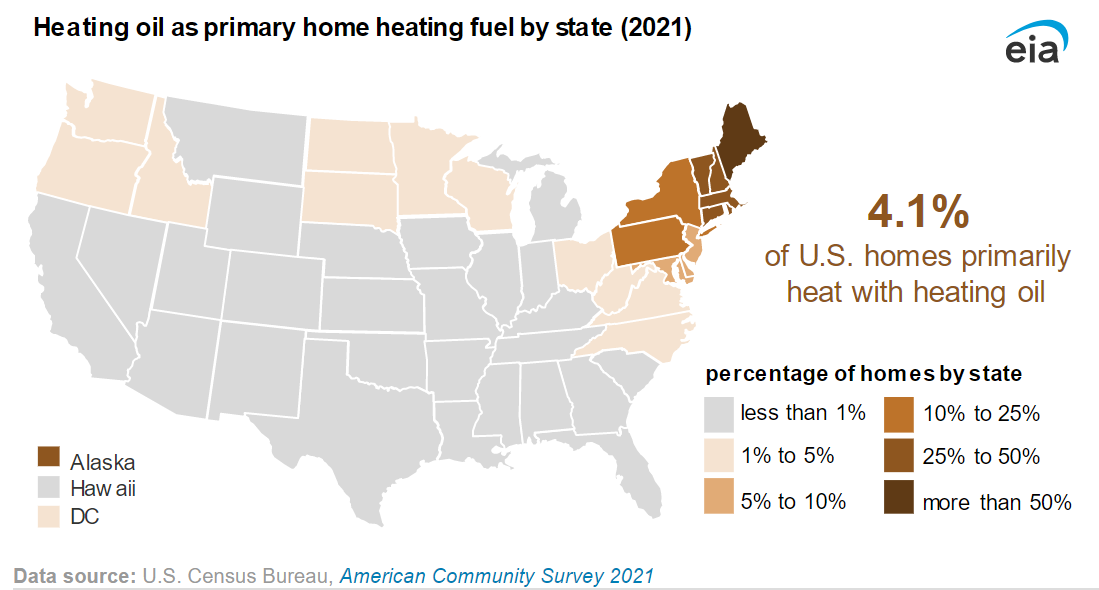
Use of heating oil by US state

Heating oil is mostly used in the northeastern and northwestern urban United States and a strong market presence in rural areas as well. Most of the northeast's heating oil comes from Irving Oil's refinery in Saint John, New Brunswick, the largest oil refinery in Canada.

== Republic of Ireland and Northern Ireland ==
Heating oil is the most common fuel for home heating in Northern Ireland due to the late development of a natural gas network. Common suppliers of heating oil in Ireland are Maxol, Patterson Oil and Emo Oil.

== England, Scotland and Wales ==
In England, Scotland and Wales, there are two types of heating oil: commercial heating oil – referring to gas oil, i.e. red diesel – and domestic heating oil – meaning kerosene, specifically BS 2869 Class C2 kerosene. Heating oil is used for home heating in England, Scotland and Wales, typically in premises away from mains gas. There are around 1.5 million people in Great Britain using oil for home heating.

The Department of Energy and Climate Change (DECC) have referred the UK oil market to the Office of Fair Trading (OFT) for review. The OFT has resolved to look at the structure of the market, with a view of the fairness for consumers and alternative energy options for off-grid consumers such as heat pumps.

=== Heating oil storage regulations in the United Kingdom ===
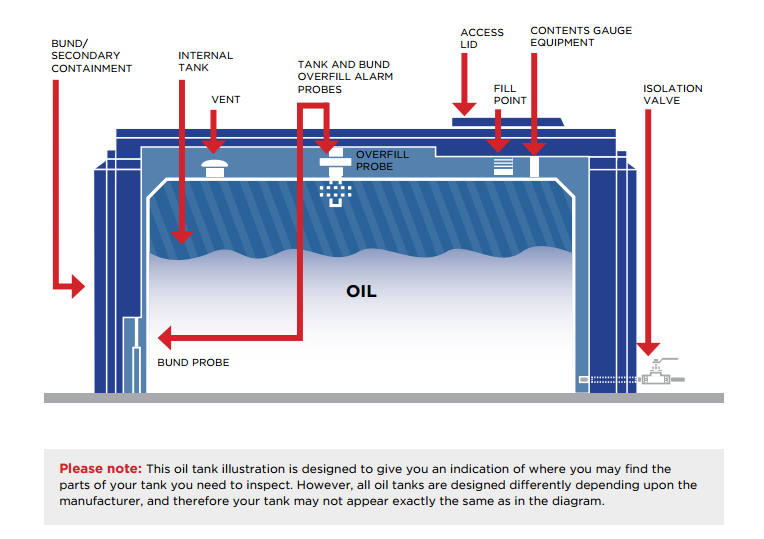
Illustration on where the parts of an oil storage tank that require inspection may be located. Tank design may vary from tank to tank.

Heating oil storage in the United Kingdom is governed by regulations that ensure the safe installation and usage of oil storage tanks. It is a criminal offence to keep a tank that violates these regulations, and the owners are liable for fines, penalties and any costs incurred as a result of cleaning up oil spills.

The regulations are designed to minimise the risk of damaging pollution and reduce the likelihood of oil being stored in hazardous environments, such as a building without proper fire safety measures. The regulations that govern oil storage tanks are The Control of Pollution (Oil Storage) England Regulations (2001), The Pollution Prevention Guidelines (PPG 2) and The Building Regulations (Approved Document J).

The Oil Storage Regulations (2001) apply to oil tanks used for commercial and industrial purposes, or domestic tanks over 3500 litres in capacity. They state that the storage tank should be of "sufficient strength and structural integrity to ensure that it is unlikely to burst or leak in its ordinary use". The tank, along with any filters, gauges, valves or ancillary equipment, must be contained within a secondary unit or bund that has at least 110% of the capacity of the inner tank. If the tank has a fill pipe that is not contained within the secondary unit, a drip tray must be installed. They also require the use of an automatic overfill prevention if it is not "reasonably practical" to monitor the oil levels within the tank.

The Building Regulations Approved Document J covers the legal requirements for the installation of the tanks within the premises of a building. The regulations state that any new tank larger than 2,500 litres must be stored within a bunded tank or secondary containment that is a minimum of 110% of the tank's capacity. If a tank is single skinned and smaller than 2,500 litres, it must be given an individual site pollution risk assessment. This highlights any pollution or hazard risks such as the possibility of the oil escaping and reaching a river or stream, or the risk of a collision if the storage tank is located near a road.

They further state that all tanks must be installed on a surface strong enough to support a full storage tank. The surface must be flat, even and fire-resistant, and should extend at least 300mm beyond the boundaries of the tank. A paving stone surface must be at least 42mm thick, and a concrete surface must be at least 100mm thick. The document also states that the tank should be situated at least 1800mm away from any potential hazards, such as doors, windows, appliance flue terminals, non-fire rated buildings such as garden fences, and at least 760mm from non-fire rated smaller structures such as wooden fences.

A safe, secure tank that complies with all regulations will look similar to the diagram above. It details the different parts of the tank that need to be checked in order to ensure the tank is legal, including where the ancillary equipment should be located and the presence of an automatic overfill prevention.

== See also ==
- Central oil storage
- Oil burner
- Fuel price risk management
- Hazardous material
- Heating, ventilation and air-conditioning (HVAC)
- United States:
  - Northeast Home Heating Oil Reserve
