= Padoor, Karnataka =

Padur
- Village
- Interactive map of Padur
- Coordinates: 13°13′39″N 74°46′54″E
- Country: India
- State: Karnataka
- District: Udupi
- Pincode: 574 106

Padur (Padoor)is a village in the Udupi district of Karnataka. It is best known for being one of the locations of the Indian strategic petroleum reserves.
