= Export restitution =

Export restitution is a term in the European Union for variable export subsidies given to traders to cover the difference between the higher internal Common Agricultural Policy price of a commodity and its lower world price.
