= Strategic Petroleum Reserve (United States) =

US strategic petroleum reserve

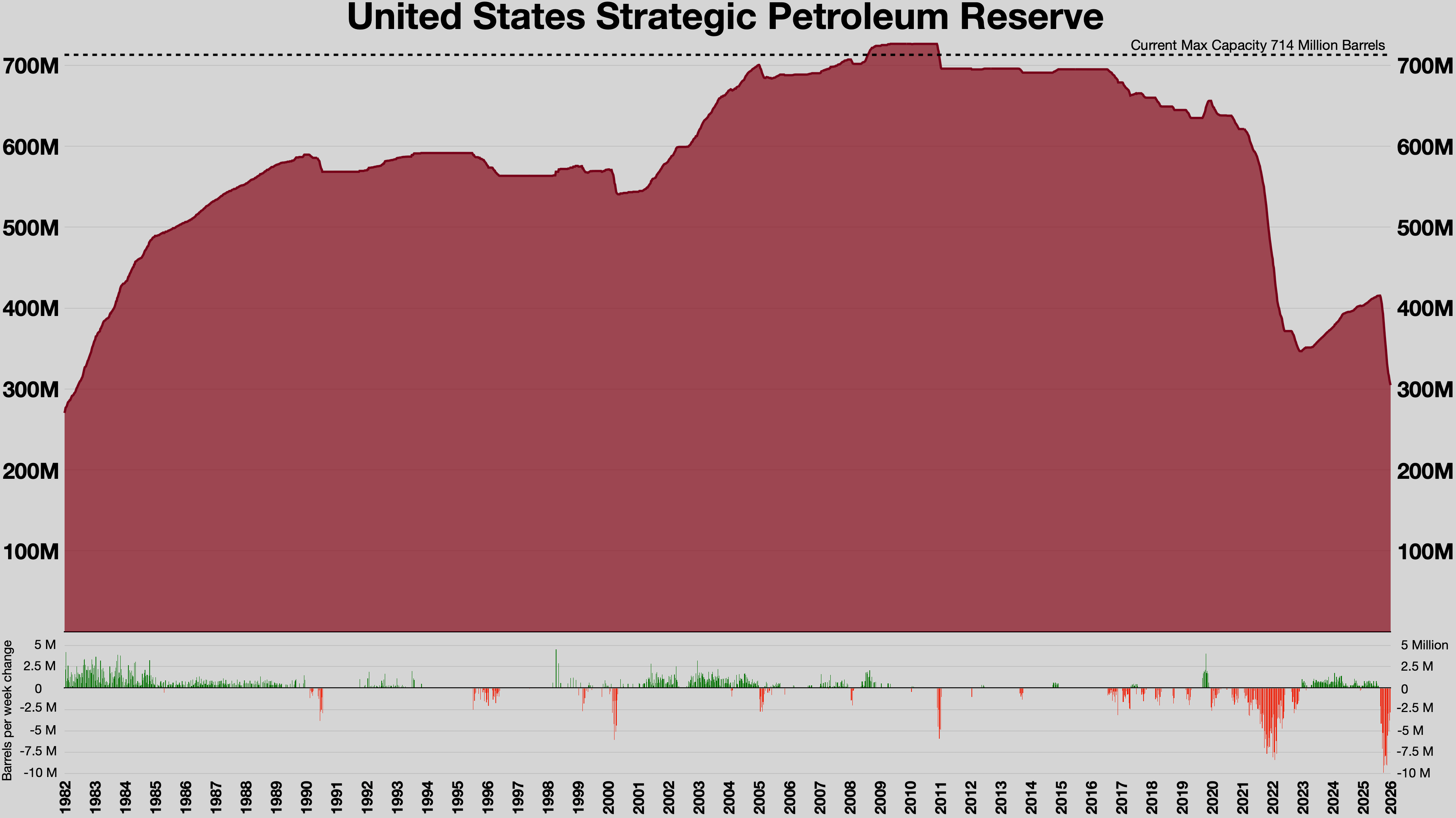
Weekly data points since 1982 Barrels of oil

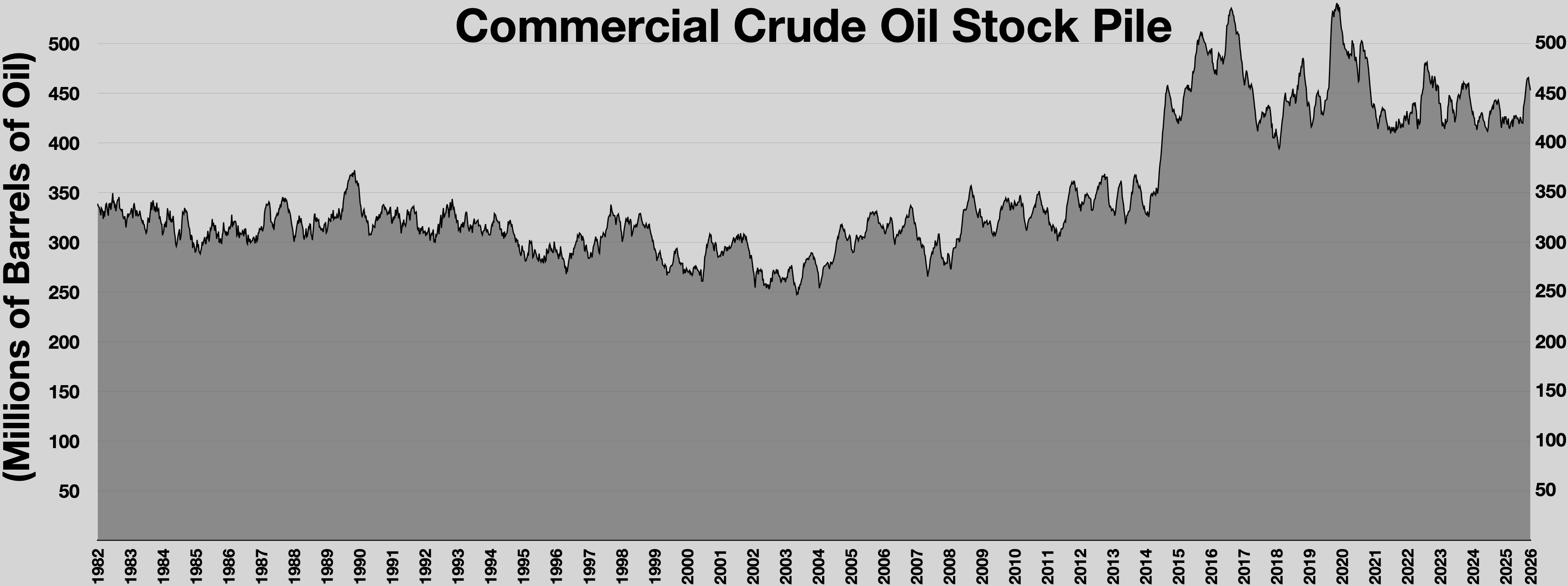
Commercial crude oil stock pile

The Strategic Petroleum Reserve (SPR) is an emergency stockpile of petroleum maintained by the United States Department of Energy (DOE). It is the largest publicly known emergency supply in the world; its underground tanks in Louisiana and Texas have capacity for 714 million barrels (113,500,000 m^{3}). The United States started the petroleum reserve in 1975 to mitigate future supply disruptions as part of the international Agreement on an International Energy Program, after oil supplies were interrupted during the 1973–1974 oil embargo.

The current inventory is displayed on the SPR's website. As of September 4, 2026, the inventory was 285.4 million barrels (45,370,000 m^{3}). This equates to about 14 days' worth of oil at 2026 daily U.S. consumption levels of 20.1 million barrels per day (3,200,000 m^{3}/d) or 42 days' worth of oil at 2026 daily U.S. import levels of 6.8 million barrels per day (1,080,000 m^{3}/d). However, the maximum total withdrawal capability from the SPR is only 2.7 million barrels per day (430,000 m^{3}/d), so it would take about 106 days to use the entire inventory. At recent market prices ($90 a barrel as of September 2026), the SPR holds over $11.3 billion in sweet crude and approximately $14.4 billion in sour crude (assuming a $15/barrel discount for sulfur content). In 2012, the total value of the crude in the SPR was approximately $43.5 billion, while the price paid for the oil was $20.1 billion (an average of $28.42 per barrel).

Since 2015, Congress has mandated sales of oil from the reserve to fund federal spending. The U.S. Department of Energy has run at least seven sales since 2017, selling 132 million barrels, or about 18.2% of what had been in the reserve.

According to legislation already in place, the amount of oil in the reserve could fall to 410 million barrels by 2028 while still meeting petroleum import coverage requirements. This will be a 40% reduction to the oil in the reservoir since 2010.

On March 31, 2022, President Joe Biden announced that his administration would release 1 million barrels of oil per day from the reserve for the next 180 days, selling it at an average price of $96 per barrel. The 2022 release became the largest ever SPR sale and lowered the SPR to its lowest levels in 40 years. After oil prices declined during the second half of the year, in December the administration announced it would begin replenishing the SPR in early 2023, expecting to purchase oil at a lower price than it was sold at, a process that would take months or years to complete. The Biden administration continued to release reserves in 2023, selling off 45% of the SPR by September 2023. The Department of Energy unveiled plans to purchase oil at a price of $79 per barrel or less, but has since purchased oil at higher prices. As of April 2024, further purchases were cancelled because of rising oil prices.

In March 2026, U.S. Secretary of Energy Chris Wright announced plans to release 172 million barrels from the SPR over 120 days, as part of a larger release of 400 million barrels by 32 member nations of the International Energy Agency. In June, the amount of oil in the US Strategic Petroleum Reserve plunged to the lowest level since 1983 as the Trump administration continues to deploy emergency oil to minimize the damage from the war with Iran.

== Facilities ==
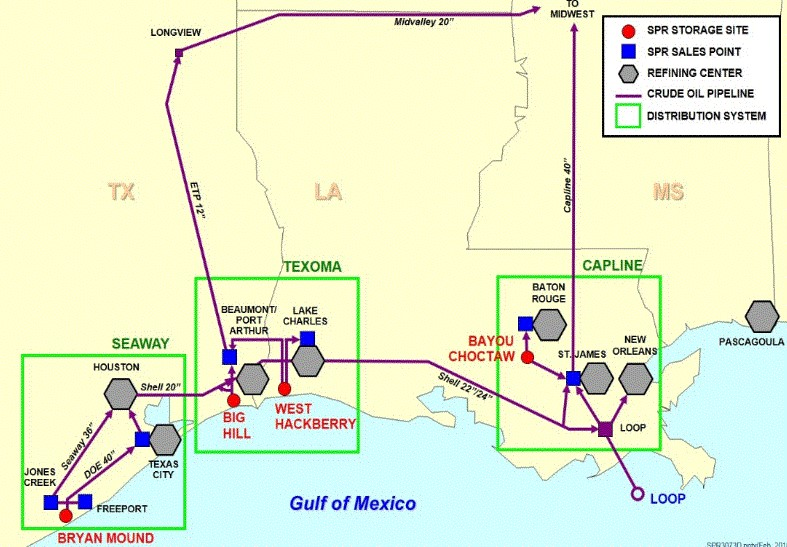
Strategic Petroleum Reserves, United States, 2018.

The SPR management office is located in Elmwood, Louisiana, a suburb of New Orleans.

The reserve is stored at four sites on the Gulf of Mexico, each located near a major center of petrochemical refining and processing. Each site contains a number of artificial caverns created in salt domes below the surface.

Individual caverns within a site can be up to 1,000 m (3,300 ft) below the surface. Average dimensions are 60 m (200 ft) wide and 600 m (2,000 ft) deep; capacity ranges from 6 to 37 million barrels (950,000 to 5,880,000 m^{3}). Almost $4 billion was spent on the facilities. The decision to store in caverns was made to reduce costs. The Department of Energy claims that it is approximately ten times more cost effective to store oil below the surface, with the added advantages of no leaks and a constant natural churn of the oil due to a temperature gradient in the caverns. The caverns were created by drilling down and then dissolving the salt with water.

=== Existing ===
- Bryan Mound: Freeport, Texas. 20 caverns with a storage capacity of 184 million barrels (29,300,000 m^{3}) with a drawdown capacity of 1.5 million barrels (240,000 m^{3}) per day.
- Big Hill: Winnie, Texas. Has a capacity of 90 million barrels (14,000,000 m^{3}) with a drawdown capacity of 0 million barrels (0 m^{3}) per day due to a construction outage.
- West Hackberry: Lake Charles, Louisiana. Has a capacity of 88 million barrels (14,000,000 m^{3}) with a drawdown capacity of 0.75 million barrels (119,000 m^{3}) per day due to low inventory.
- Bayou Choctaw: Baton Rouge, Louisiana. Has a capacity of 51 million barrels (8,100,000 m^{3}) with a maximum drawdown rate of 0.45 million barrels (72,000 m^{3}) per day.

=== Retired ===
- Weeks Island: Iberia Parish, Louisiana (decommissioned 1999): Capacity of 72 million barrels (11,400,000 m^{3}). This facility was a conventional room and pillar near-surface salt mine, formerly owned by Morton Salt. In 1993, a sinkhole formed on the site, allowing fresh water to intrude into the mine. Because of the mine's construction in salt deposits, fresh water would erode the ceiling, potentially causing the structure to fail. The mine was backfilled with salt-saturated brine. This process, which allowed for recovery of 98% of the petroleum stored in the facility, reduced the risk of further fresh water intrusion, and helped prevent the remaining oil from leaking into the aquifer that is located over the salt dome.

== History ==
=== Background ===
The SPR was created following the 1973 energy crisis. On November 18, 1974, the United States became a signatory to the Agreement on an International Energy Program (IEP) and a founding member of the International Energy Agency that the IEP established. One of the key commitments made by the treaty's signatories is to maintain oil stocks of no less than 90 days of net imports.

Access to the reserve is determined by the conditions written into the 1975 Energy Policy and Conservation Act (EPCA), primarily to counter a severe supply interruption. The maximum removal rate, by physical constraints, is 2.7 million barrels per day (430,000 m^{3}/d). Oil could begin entering the marketplace 13 days after a presidential order. The Department of Energy says it has about 59 days of import protection in the SPR. This, combined with private sector inventory protection, is estimated to equal 115 days of imports.

The EPCA of December 22, 1975, made it policy for the United States to establish a reserve up to 1 billion barrels (159 million m^{3}) of petroleum. A number of existing storage sites were acquired in 1977. Construction of the first surface facilities began in June 1977. On July 21, 1977, the first oil—approximately 412,000 barrels (65,500 m^{3}) of Saudi Arabian light crude—was delivered to the SPR. Fill was suspended in Fiscal Year 1995 to devote budget resources to refurbishing the SPR equipment and extending the life of the complex.

=== Domestic actions ===
On November 13, 2001, shortly after the September 11 terrorist attacks, President George W. Bush announced that the SPR would be filled, saying, "The Strategic Petroleum Reserve is an important element of our Nation's energy security. To maximize long-term protection against oil supply disruptions, I am directing the Secretary of Energy to fill the SPR up to its 700 million barrels (110,000,000 m^{3}) capacity." The highest prior level was reached in 1994 with 592 million barrels (94,100,000 m^{3}). At the time of President Bush's directive, the SPR contained about 545 million barrels (86,600,000 m^{3}). Since the directive in 2001, the capacity of the SPR has increased by 27 million barrels (4,300,000 m^{3}) due to natural enlargement of the salt caverns in which the reserves are stored. The Energy Policy Act of 2005 has since directed the Secretary of Energy to fill the SPR to the full 1 billion barrels (160,000,000 m^{3}) authorized capacity, a process which will require a physical expansion of the Reserve's facilities.

On August 17, 2005, the SPR reached its goal of 700 million barrels (110,000,000 m^{3}). Approximately 60% of the crude oil in the reserve is the less desirable sour (high sulfur content) variety. The oil delivered to the reserve is "royalty-in-kind" oil—royalties owed to the U.S. government by operators who acquire leases on the federally owned Outer Continental Shelf in the Gulf of Mexico. These royalties were previously collected as cash, but in 1998 the government began testing the effectiveness of collecting royalties "in kind"—or in other words, acquiring the crude oil itself. This mechanism was adopted when refilling the SPR began, and once filling is completed, revenues from the sale of future royalties will be paid into the federal treasury.

On April 25, 2006, President Bush announced a temporary halt to petroleum deposits to the SPR as part of a four-point program to alleviate high fuel prices.

On January 23, 2007, President Bush suggested in his State of the Union speech that Congress should approve expansion of the current reserve capacity to twice its current level.

On May 16, 2008, the U.S. Department of Energy (DOE) said it would halt all deliveries to the Strategic Petroleum Reserve sometime in July. This announcement came days after Congress voted to direct the Bush administration to do the same.

On January 2, 2009, after a sharp decline in fuel prices, DOE said that it would begin buying approximately 12,000,000 barrels (1,900,000 m^{3}) of crude oil to fill the Strategic Petroleum Reserve, replenishing supplies that were sold after hurricanes Katrina and Rita in 2005. The purchase would be funded by the roughly $600 million received from those emergency sales.

On September 9, 2011, a Notice of Cancellation was published in the Federal Register after Congress rescinded funding for the expansion of the Strategic Petroleum Reserve, reversing the SPR expansion initiative previously directed under the Energy Policy Act of 2005.

On October 20, 2014, a report by the U.S. Government Accountability Office (GAO) recommended reducing the size of the Reserve. According to the report, the amount of oil held in reserve exceeds the amount required to be kept on hand given the need for imported crude oil had decreased in recent years. The report said the DOE agreed with the GAO recommendation.

On March 19, 2020, President Donald Trump directed the Department of Energy to fill the Strategic Petroleum Reserve to maximum capacity, when oil was priced at $24 per barrel. This directive was given to help support domestic oil producers given the impending economic collapse from COVID-19 and extreme drops in international oil markets. However, funding was blocked by Congress, with Senate Democratic Leader Chuck Schumer stating that Democrats had blocked a "bailout for big oil".

In 2022, the Biden administration sold 180 million barrels of oil from the Strategic Petroleum Reserve over 6 months. The sale lowered the SPR to its lowest levels in 40 years and was the largest ever release of oil from the SPR. SPR drawdowns continued into 2023, lowering the SPR by 45% from January 2021. Since the 2022 sales, the Department of Energy bought back 32.3 million barrels of oil, aiming to purchase at a maximum price of $79 per barrel. However, oil has been purchased exceeding the $79 price cap in March 2024. As of April 2024, further SPR purchases were cancelled due to rising oil prices.

=== Emergency sales to Israel ===
According to the 1975 Sinai Interim Agreement signed by the United States and Israel, as a precondition for Israel's return of the Sinai Peninsula and its associated oil reserves to Egypt, in an emergency the United States was obligated to make oil available for sale to Israel for up to five years. Israel has never invoked the agreement, however. The agreement was extended in 1979, 1994, 2004, and, most recently, in 2015 for a ten-year period.

=== International obligations ===
As a member of the International Energy Agency (IEA), the United States must stock an amount of petroleum equivalent to at least 90 days of U.S. imports. The SPR contained an equivalent to 141 days of imports as of September 2016. The United States is also obligated to contribute 43.9% of petroleum in any IEA-coordinated release.

== Limitations ==
The Strategic Petroleum Reserve is primarily a crude petroleum reserve, not a stockpile of refined petroleum fuels such as gasoline, diesel and kerosene. Although the United States maintains some extra supply of refined petroleum fuels, e.g., the Northeast Home Heating Oil Reserve and until July 2, 2024, the Northeast Gasoline Supply Reserve under the aegis of the Department of Energy (DOE), the government does not maintain gasoline reserves on anything like the scale of the SPR. The SPR is intended to give the United States protection from disruptions in oil supplies. In the event of a major disruption to refinery operations, the United States would have to call on members of the International Energy Agency that stockpile refined products, and use refining capacities outside of the continental United States for relief.

There have been suggestions that the DOE should increase its supplies and stockpile both gasoline and jet fuel. Some countries and zones have a strategic reserve of both petroleum and petroleum products. In some cases, this includes a strategic reserve of jet fuel.

Former Secretary of Energy Samuel Bodman said that the Department would consider new facilities for refined products as part of an expansion of 1 to 1.5 billion barrels (160,000,000 to 240,000,000 m^{3}).

== Drawdowns ==
=== Petroleum sales - Prior to 2015 ===
- 1985: Test sale—1.1 million barrels (170,000 m^{3})
- 1990–1991: Desert Storm sale—21 million barrels (3,300,000 m^{3})
  - 4 million barrels (640,000 m^{3}) in October 1990 test sale
  - 17 million barrels (2,700,000 m^{3}) in January 1991 presidentially ordered drawdown
- 1996–1997: 28 million barrels (4,500,000 m^{3}) non-emergency sales for deficit reduction
- July–August 2000: 2.8 million barrels (450,000 m^{3}) to supply the Northeast Home Heating Oil Reserve.
- September–October 2000: 30 million barrels (4,800,000 m^{3}) in response to a concern over low distillate levels in the northeastern U.S.
- 2005 Hurricane Katrina sale: 11 million barrels (1,700,000 m^{3})—Katrina shut down 95% of crude production and 88% of natural gas output in the Gulf of Mexico. This amounted to a quarter of total U.S. output. About 735 oil and natural gas rigs and platforms had been evacuated due to the hurricane.
- 2011 Arab Spring sale: 30 million barrels (4,800,000 m^{3})—non-emergency sale to offset disruptions caused by political upheaval in Libya and elsewhere in the Middle East. The amount was matched by IEA countries, for a total of 60 million barrels (9,500,000 m^{3}) released from stockpiles around the world.

=== Petroleum exchanges and loans ===
Note: Loans are made on a case-by-case basis to alleviate supply disruptions. Once conditions return to normal, the loan is returned to the SPR with additional oil as interest.

- April–May 1996: 900,000 barrels (140,000 m^{3}) lent to ARCO to alleviate pipeline blockage.
- August 1998: 11 million barrels (1,700,000 m^{3}) lent to PEMEX in return for 8.5 million barrels (1,350,000 m^{3}) of higher-quality crude.
- June 2000: 1 million barrels (160,000 m^{3}) lent to Citgo and Conoco in response to shipping channel blockage.
- October 2002: 296,000 barrels (47,100 m^{3}) lent to Shell Pipeline Company in advance of Hurricane Lili.
- September–October 2004: 5.4 million barrels (860,000 m^{3}) lent to Astra Oil, ConocoPhillips, Placid Refining, Shell Oil Company, and Premcor after Hurricane Ivan.
- September–October 2005: 9.8 million barrels (1,560,000 m^{3}) lent to ExxonMobil, Placid Refining, Valero, BP, Marathon Oil, and TotalEnergies after Hurricane Katrina. Purchases of crude oil would then resume in January 2009 using revenues available from the 2005 Hurricane Katrina emergency sale. The DOE purchased 10.7 million barrels (1,700,000 m^{3}) at a cost of $553 million.
- January–February 2006: 767,000 barrels (121,900 m^{3}) lent to Total Petrochemicals USA due to closure of the Sabine–Neches Waterway to deep-draft vessels after a barge accident in the channel.
- June 2006: 750,000 barrels (119,000 m^{3}) of sour crude lent to ConocoPhillips and Citgo due to the closure for several days of the Calcasieu Ship Channel caused by the release of a mixture of storm water and oil. Repaid in early October 2006.
- September 2008: 630,000 barrels (100,000 m^{3}) lent to Citgo, Placid Refining, and Marathon Oil due to disruptions from Hurricane Gustav.
- August 2017: 200,000 barrels of sweet crude and 300,000 barrels of sour crude were lent to Phillips 66 due to disruptions from Hurricane Harvey.

=== Drawdowns since 2015 ===
Since 2015, Congress has been selling the oil in the reserve to fund the deficit, in unpublicized sales. The U.S. Department of Energy has run seven sales since 2017, selling more than 132 million barrels, or about 18.2% of what had been in the reserve.

According to legislation already in place, the amount of oil in the reserve could fall to as little as 238 million barrels by 2028. This will be a 67% reduction of oil in the reserve since 2010.

The legislation is summarized below:

- The Bipartisan Budget Act (Section 404), enacted in 2015, includes authorization for funding an SPR modernization program to support improvements deemed necessary to preserve the long-term integrity and utility of SPR's infrastructure by selling up to $2 billion worth of SPR crude oil in fiscal years 2017 through 2020. Although the estimated volumes presented in the chart above are based on an assumed oil price of $50 per barrel, the actual final sales volumes will depend on how SPR decides to allocate the sales volumes across those fiscal years and the actual price of crude oil at the time of the sales. For the Section 404 sales, SPR must get an appropriation from Congress to approve its requested sales revenue target.
- Another section of the Bipartisan Budget Act (Section 403), enacted in 2015, mandates SPR crude oil sales for fiscal years 2018 through 2025 on a volumetric basis, rather than on a dollar basis, as specified in Section 404. The revenues from sales authorized under section 403 will be deposited into the general fund of the U.S. Department of the Treasury.
- The Fixing America's Surface Transportation Act, enacted in December 2015, calls for SPR sales totaling 66 million barrels from fiscal years 2023 through 2025.
- The 21st Century Cures Act, enacted in December 2016, calls for the sale of 25 million barrels of SPR crude oil for fiscal years 2017 through 2019. The first portion of these sales is expected in late spring 2017.
- In December 2016, the DOE announced it would begin the sale of 190 million barrels (30,000,000 m^{3}) in January 2017.
- The Tax Cuts and Jobs Act of 2017, enacted in December 2017, calls for the sale of 7 million barrels over the two-year period of FY 2026 through FY 2027.
- The Bipartisan Budget Act of 2018, enacted in February 2018, calls for the sale of 30 million barrels over the four-year period of FY 2022 through FY 2025, 35 million barrels in FY 2026, and 35 million barrels in FY 2027.
- In November 2021, the White House announced the release of 50 million barrels (7,900,000 m^{3}) to address high gasoline prices.
- On March 1, 2022, President Biden announced the release of 30 million barrels of oil from the reserve in response to Russia's invasion of Ukraine.
- On March 31, 2022, President Biden announced that his administration would release 1 million barrels of oil per day from the reserve for the next 180 days.

=== Drawdowns since the 2026 Iran war ===
- On March 11, 2026, U.S. Secretary of Energy Chris Wright announced the release of 172 million barrels over approximately 120 days in response to rising oil prices resulting from United States' strikes on Iran.
- By August 2026, sustained withdrawals had left the reserve at its lowest level since 1982. On August 30, President Trump said in a social media post that he would refill it with oil obtained under an agreement with Venezuela covering some 65 billion barrels of reserves, and that the process would "begin very shortly". The New York Times reported that new oil projects take years to produce meaningful volumes, particularly in Venezuela, where much of the energy infrastructure was in disrepair after years of mismanagement, and that any purchase of oil for the reserve would require Congress to authorize the spending.
- By September 2026, it was reported that the strategic reserve had reduced its capacity by more than 30%, from 415 million barrels in February to 285 million barrels by the end of September 2026. This was the lowest level it has been at since the 1980s. This reduced capacity also raised issues regarding the structural integrity of the salt caverns and the ability to have more crude oil extracted from the reserve.
- On October 30, 2026, the Trump administration had released 174.1 million barrels cumulatively from the reserve as a result of the 2026 Iran war. This marked the completion of its drawdown commitment of 172 million barrels, which formed part of an overall global drawdown of 400 million barrels. The October drawdown neared 41 million barrels and was a response to the soaring energy costs. This resulted in the reserve being at its lowest level since 1982. ExxonMobil and Trafigura were among the major beneficiaries of the contracts.

== In popular culture ==
- The West Wing episode "Noël" features a White House discussion on tapping the SPR.

== See also ==
- Global strategic petroleum reserves
- Strategic natural gas reserve
