= Wushi oil field =

Oil and gas field

- Location within China
- Country: China
- Region: South China Sea
- Location: Guangdong
- Offshore/onshore: offshore
- Coordinates: 21.11°N 111.38°E
- Operator: COOEC
- Partners: CNOOC, Zhanjiang municipality, Newfield Exploration, BP

Field history
- Discovery: 2005
- Start of development: 2016

Wushi Oil Field is an oil and gas field located in the South China Sea Exclusive Economic Zone, 30 miles from Zhanjiang, off the southern coast of Guangdong, China.

The region has been the site of new oil and gas related explorations prospect since 2016 though discoveries and surveys have been carried out in the region since 2005 in blocks 17/08 and 16/05.

== History and development ==
Since early 2000, exploration for oil had been well underway in the Tarim basin region where the Wushi sag and Wensu uplift are located. Research by the Petro China institute for oil exploration had found that the compression anticlines that had formed during the late Himalayan tectonic movement had made the Wushi sag a favorable site for petroleum accumulation.

In 2010, CNOOC started to auction oil blocks in the Wushi basin to national as well as international companies when a total of thirteen oil blocks were auctioned for joint development. Block 23/07 lying in the Wushi Sag and partly on Qixi Massif of Beibuwan Basin was auctioned in 2010 to foreign companies who wanted to develop it jointly with CNOOC. This was the first batch of open blocks in China being auctioned to foreign companies.

In 2011, Block 23/08 lying in the western part of the Wushi sag in a depth of 15 to 30m and covering an area of 1,210 square kilometers was auctioned. By then, Two wells had already been drilled in this block. As further exploration was undertaken in the region, the first commercial discovery of Wushi 17-2 was made in Wushi Sag in the Western part of South China Sea.

In 2014, CNOOC made a further appraisal of Wushi 17-2 which was declared "mid-sized oil and gas structure".

In 2016, CNOOC and the Zhanjiang government allocated 63 billion yuan ($9.2 billion) for projects around Zhanjiang during the 13th Five-Year Plan period (2016–20). This includes the Wushi 17-2 oil field in Wushi Sag, Wushi oil field. The Wushi oil field project is the first oilfield under Zhanjiang's administration and also Guangdong's first offshore oil and gas field in shallow waters.

Phase 1 of the technical proposal passed review in February 2016 and the environmental impact assessment received the national government's approval in 2017. Zhanjiang city and Wushi oil field are expected to be part of China's Belt and Road Initiative and is expected to provide clean energy to the residents of Guangdong.

Though traditionally, oil companies assign code names to offshore prospects early in the exploration effort to help ensure secrecy, Wushi oil field was named by the holding companies CNOOC and COOEC in relation to its location as well as a reference to Chinese culture and aspirations.

== Oil wells in Wushi oil field ==
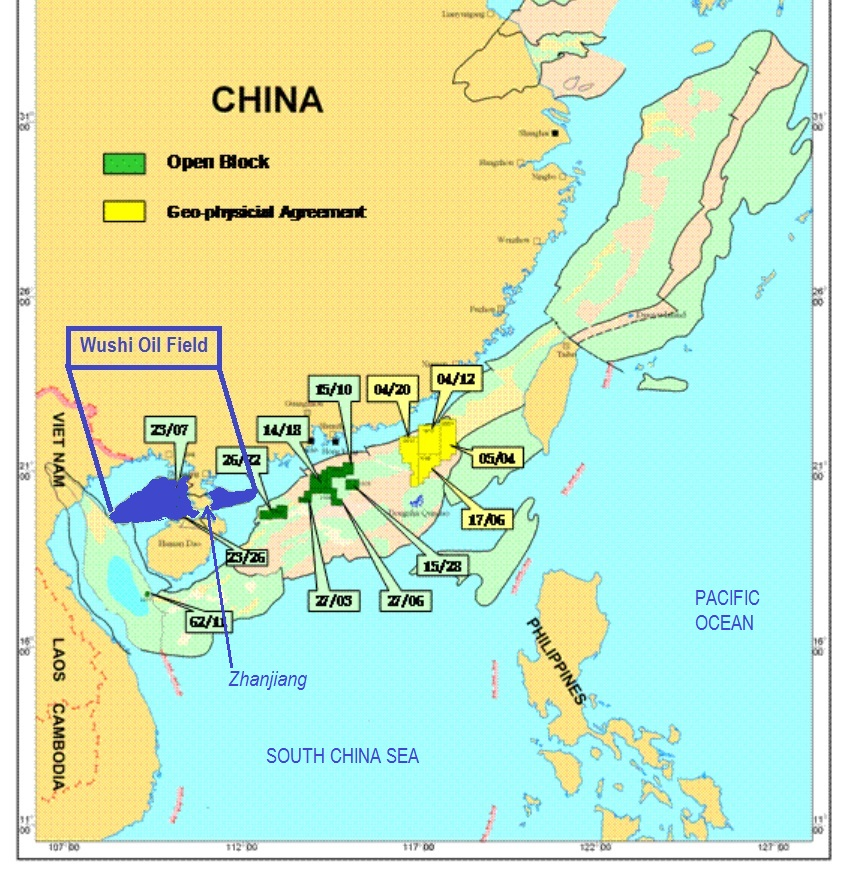
Wushi oil field and oil blocks in the vicinity

=== Block 23/07 ===
Location: Wushi Sag and partly on Qixi Massif of Beibuwan Basin

Depth of water: 18m to 40m

Area: 1649 km^{2}.

Seismic data: 5012 km of 2D seismic data

Number of wells drilled so far: Two.

=== Block 23/08 ===
Location: western Wushi Sag

Description: covering a part of Qixi Massif of Beibuwan Basin

Depth of water: 15m to 30m

Area: 1,212 km^{2}.

Seismic data: 4,190 km of 2D and 118km2 of 3D seismic data

Co-ordinates: 109°11′E 20°40′ N / 109°24′E 20°40′N / 109°24′E 20°20′N / 109°04′N 20°20′N / 109°04′E 20°35′N / 109°11′E 20°35′N

Number of wells drilled so far: Two.

=== Block 23/10 ===
Developed by CNOOC in co-operation with UK based Cairn Energy under a Production Sharing Contract. the 2,945 km^{2} region of Block 23/10 lies in the shallow waters of the Wushi Sag area in the eastern Beibu Gulf. The contract is a standard seven-year, three-phase contract consisting of a work program of 2,000 km of seismic acquisition and one wildcat required in the first phase. Seismic recording commenced in 1996, and was followed by drilling in the region in 1997. The Eocene Liushagang Formation provides the source and reservoir in the area. This tract contains the WU 16-1 discovery that was drilled by the French company Total in the early 1980s, but which was not developed at that time, since it was considered sub-commercial.

== Location ==
The oil field is located in the South China sea, 100 miles from Zhanjiang, a provincial level city in the Southern part of Guangdong province, South China, Close to Nansha, Hainan. China state owned oil exploration company COOEC is the operator of the oil field and principal developer of the oil field with large scale support from the state owned parent company CNOOC. This is the first oil field off China which will be developed along with the local municipality (in this case, the municipal government of Zhanjiang). Zhanjiang city also has one of the largest oil and gas fabrication shipyards of CNOOC Engineering in China and this is expected to support the requirements of the Wushi oil field.

== Geological target ==
Due for commencing operations in 2017–2018, the oil field is expected to have an initial output of 1 mtpa according to the Zhanjiang municipality and Zhanjiang offshore petroleum taxation bureau. Its reserves are expected to last for twenty years after production commences.

== Exploration, Oil blocks and entities ==
The Wushi oil field consists of a number of oil blocks, ranging in area from a few square kilometres up to a few thousand square kilometres. Each block itself consists of a number of oil wells, developed by the entities operating each block.

== See also ==
- Petroleum industry in China
- China National Offshore Oil Corporation
