= Xinjiang Guanghui Industry Investment Group =

Chinese national oil company

Xinjiang Guanghui Industry Investment Group Co., Ltd.
- Native name: 新疆广汇实业投资（集团）有限责任公司
- Romanized name: Xīnjiāng guǎng huì shíyè tóuzī (jítuán) yǒuxiàn zérèn gōngsī
- Type: Public company
- Industry: Natural gas, oil, coal
- Founded: 2 May 1989; 37 years ago
- Founder: Sun Guangxin
- Headquarters: Ürümqi, China
- Key people: Xiao Yong Wu (Chairman); Fa Xian Lin (General Manager)
- Operating income: ▲US$24.30 billion
- Net income: ▲US$5 billion
- Number of employees: 108,000
- Subsidiaries: Xinjiang Guanghui Real Estate Development Company; China Grand Automotive Services; Guanghui Energy
- Website: en.guanghui.com

Xinjiang Guanghui Industry Investment Group
- Simplified Chinese: 新疆广汇实业投资（集团）有限责任公司
- Traditional Chinese: 新疆廣匯實業投資（集團）有限責任公司
Transcriptions
Standard Mandarin
- Hanyu Pinyin: Xīn Tiān Lǜsè Néngyuán Gǔfèn Yǒuxiàn Gōngsī

Xinjiang Guanghui Industry Investment Group Co., Ltd. (Chinese: 新疆广汇实业投资（集团）有限责任公司; pinyin: Xīnjiāng guǎng huì shíyè tóuzī (jítuán) yǒuxiàn zérèn gōngsī) is a major automotive sales, energy, mining, and real estate company based in the city of Ürümqi in the Xinjiang Autonomous Region of China. It was founded in 1989 by Sun Guangxin as a privately owned restaurant, nightclub, and recreational sports company, but entered the real estate development business in 1993. This subsidiary, Xinjiang Guanghui Real Estate Development, became the largest private real estate owner in Ürümqi.

Xinjiang Guanghui Industry went public in 2000. It now has numerous subsidiaries. The most prominent of these is Guanghui Energy, which engages in oil and natural gas exploration and development, the importation of natural gas and liquified natural gas, coal mining, and coal gasification. Other subsidiaries include China Grand Automotive, now China's largest automotive dealership, and Guanghui Industrial Co., a construction stone provider.

== Overview ==
Xinjiang Guanghui Industry is a conglomerate which, as of 2021, was engaged in five major businesses: The liquefaction of natural gas; the importation of liquified natural gas (LNG), coal gasification, coal mining, and oil and gas exploration and development. Its major products included coal, coal tar, LNG, methanol, and petroleum. Guanghui Energy was the first large-scale land-based LNG production supplier in China.

Xinjiang Guanghui Industry generated more than $29 billion in revenue in 2020, and employed more than 108,000 people.

Company founder Sun Guangxin had an estimated worth of about $2.1 billion in 2021.

== Corporate history ==
=== Foundation, early ventures ===
The company was founded on 2 May 1989, under the name Ürümqi Guanghui Industry and Trade Company by Sun Guangxin, a former captain in the People's Liberation Army who had left military service a year before. Initially, Sun opened a restaurant that served fresh seafood imported daily from the coast. Historian James A. Millward says that sources vary as to where he got the funds for his business. (Note: Guangxin either used $400 he had saved during his military service, or he obtained a $50,000 loan from a Japanese cotton dealer. Allegedly, Guangxin helped the cotton dealer with the permits and approvals necessary to get a shipment of cotton from Xinjiang to an east coast port.) Not only was fresh seafood a novelty in Ürümqi, it was favored by government and business elites. Sun began making extensive connections in government, the Chinese Communist Party (CCP), and oil and banking industry executives. He opened a series of entertainment venues in Ürümqi, including the city's first bowling alley, discothèque, karaoke bar, and swimming pool. As his business interests grew, Sun employed many former army officers in key positions.

During the collapse of the Soviet Union, the company began importing oil drilling equipment from Russia and selling it to state-owned firms in China. (Note: The date of Guanghui's entry into this business is not clear. The company says this began in May 1990, while Forbes magazine reporter John Hyatt is less specific and dates it to the early 1990s. Historian James A. Millward says this business began in the late 1990s.)

Guanghui's first subsidiary was the Xinjiang Guanghui Real Estate Development Company, established in February 1993. A year later, the Guanghui Industrial Co. subsidiary was founded to process raw stone for the construction industry. It was a joint venture with a Hong Kong firm, which gave Guanghui Industrial significant tax breaks. Sun Guangxin was accused (but not convicted) of paying bribes in 1993. Afterward, he more strongly cultivated his ties with the local and regional Communist Party. He founded a branch of the local Communist Party within Guanghui and convinced the local party secretary to run it. The move shocked many in the party, and national CCP officials almost expelled the secretary. (Note: The inclusion of the CCP in private corporate governance was, James Millward writes, "the wave of the future". It became one of the central elements in the "Three Represents" socio-political theory adopted by the CCP in 2002. "Three Represents" was the ideological theory proposed by Jiang Zemin, then General Secretary of the Chinese Communist Party. About 2002, the city agreed to appoint five government officials to executive positions at Xinjiang Guanghui Real Estate Development. One of them led the city office that issues demolition permits.) The effort paid off: In 1995, Sun was given an "Outstanding Chinese Young People" award.

In the 1990s, Guanghui rapidly expanded its real estate redevelopment portfolio. Using his close connections with the local CCP and local government officials, Sun began obtaining permission to purchase shuttered factories, many of them on some of the best sites in the city. These included the May First Lumber Factory, October Tractor Factory, Tianshan Shoe Factory, Xinjiang Cooking Utensils Factory, and Xinjiang Specialised Automobile Factory. Financing the purchases with unsecured loans from banks and by mortgaging its own assets, Guanghui razed the properties it acquired and began building apartments and office towers on them. The Xinjiang Specialised Automobile Factory became the "Garden of Shining Stars" 30-building luxury apartment complex, while the October Tractor Factory became the "Red October Garden" luxury apartments. Guanghui constructed Zhong Tian Plaza (at the time of its completion, the tallest building in northwest China) and the Holiday Inn Express Ürümqi Station. The city government allowed the company to tear down its multi-story office building and build a skyscraper on the site; in return, the company built a new 20-story Ürümqi Government Office Building at no cost to the city. By 2021, Guanghui had control of 60 percent of the city's real estate.

=== Entry into the automotive field ===
In 1999, Guanghui won permission from the Chinese national government to build a factory to manufacture luxury passenger automobiles, and to establish a chain of automobile dealerships. The new subsidiary was named China Grand Automotive Services, and headquartered in Shanghai. China Grand Automotive also leased passenger cars, provided repair and maintenance services, and allowed its automobiles to be sold on a commission basis by others. The American private equity investment firm, TPG Inc., made three investments in China Grand Automotive from 2007 to 2010, (Note: Bloomberg Business News said the total amount of the investment was not known, but China Money Network later reported it was about $100 million.) building a 40 percent stake in the subsidiary.

The capital infusion allowed China Grand Automotive to establish an automotive insurance brokerage, automobile financing service, car rental service, and online pre-owned vehicle auction site. The firm also purchased automotive dealerships in Anhui, Gansu, Hebei, Ningxia, and Shandong provinces as well as the city of Chongqing, and began selling Buick, Toyota, and Volkswagen automobiles. By 2014, China Grand Automotive was the largest passenger vehicle dealership in China, with 494 outlets. It was also the country's largest vehicle finance provider, and the largest pre-owned vehicle seller. TPG sold its stake in China Grand Automotive in December 2014 for $700 million to a group of Chinese investors.

Xinjiang Guanghui Industry Investment Group went public in 2000, and its stock was listed on the Shanghai Stock Exchange. It made two more stock offerings by the end of 2003.

=== Entry into the energy field ===
Guanghui had been interested in the energy development field almost since its inception, and in 1994 the parent company adopted the name Guanghui Energy.

About 2002, Guanghui won permission from the Chinese government to market natural gas. Guanghui became the first private Chinese company to enter the energy development and distribution field, as Chinese law had previously prohibited private companies from doing so. The impetus for the company's move came after the Chinese government decided to build a 4,200 km (2,600 mi) natural gas pipeline from Shanghai to Xinjiang. Sun proposed that his new subsidiary, Guanghui Energy, collect natural gas in Xinjiang Province's northern oil fields and pipe it into the southern part of the province. The powerful national State Development Planning Commission and the state-owned oil company developing the pipeline, PetroChina, were both initially opposed to the idea. Sun convinced them that his marketing scheme would not compete with the pipeline. He also pledged to share his profits with the provinces through which the pipeline ran. Eager to collect taxes from Guanghui Energy, Xinjiang Province delegated deputy governor Airkin Iminbaqee acted as a lobbyist for Sun. The provincial government also waived rent for any public land the project used. The provincial government also informally pledged security for the scheme and helped negotiate natural gas contracts with customers in cities like Tianjin and Wuhan.

Guanghui Energy became the first entity in China to move natural gas in large quantities via truck. The first deliveries occurred in 2003, some trucks shipping gas as much as 5,000 km (3,100 mi). The company signed a 15-year contract to collect natural gas from the Turpan-Hami oil fields, where it had previously been flared. With technical assistance from Tractebel Gas Engineering and Linde Engineering, a new subsidiary, Xinjiang Guanghui Liquefied Natural Gas Development Co. Ltd., built a liquefied natural gas (LNG) plant near the city of Turpan in Shanshan County. It went online in 2004, and was capable of making 400,000 metric tons (390,000 long tons; 440,000 short tons) per year. The trucks delivered the LNG to satellite facilities or vehicle refueling stations, where it was revaporized. The satellite facilities then delivered some natural gas via pipeline to consumers or industry. Although ENN Xinao Gas began distributing natural gas by truck as well after 1993 and many roads and highways in China were unable to carry such heavily loaded vehicles, the truck distribution system proved viable. By 2019, Guanghui had scaled back its trucking business, and only delivered LNG to southern provinces during peak season.

=== Expansion in the energy field ===
On 9 September 2005, Guanghui Energy purchased a 49 percent stake in Turkmengas State Gas Company (TMG), an oil exploration and production company based in Kazakhstan. The $300 million investment allowed TMG to develop the Zaysan block in eastern Kazakhstan.

In anticipation of production, Guanhui Energy in March 2006 accepted an investment worth up to $300 million from Newbridge Capital. The money went to build a second LNG facility, this one in or Jimunai County. (Note: Another source says this was in Shanshan County.) capable of producing up to 3,000,000 metric tons (3,000,000 long tons; 3,300,000 short tons) per year. Although PetroChina made a verbal commitment to supply natural gas to the facility, Guanghui Energy failed to secure a supply. Newbridge sold its 24.99 percent stake in the LNG plant to Guanghui for $45.96 million in July 2007.

Guanghui Energy attempted to find this supply in Kazakhstan. In June 2009, the company received permission from the Chinese and Kazakh governments to build a cross-border pipeline to transmit natural gas from Kazakhstan to China. The pipeline, which engineers said would deliver 1,500,000 metric tons (1,500,000 long tons; 1,700,000 short tons) of gas daily, would deliver natural gas from Kazakhstan's Zayan block to Guanghui's idle LNG plant. This was followed in September 2009 by Guanghui's purchase of a 49 percent stake (worth $40.52 million) in Tarbagatay Munay (TBM), a Kazakh company with oil and gas exploration and development rights in the Zaysan block. Guanghui also obtained 50 percent of TBM's management rights. This made Guanghu the first Chinese company to obtain oil and gas resources abroad.

The cross-border pipeline project stalled, however, as it lacked an oil import license.

Anticipating approval, however, Guanghui Energy purchased for $200 million a 51 percent stake in the South Imashevsky block in Kazakhstan.

In July 2012, after the Chinese government enacted new policies to encourage private investment in monopoly industries, Guanghui Energy applied for a crude oil import license. Approval to import natural gas was given in October 2012. The 110 km (68 mi) long pipeline was already complete on both sides of the border, and Guanghui said connecting the two sections at the border would take about a month. It became the first privately owned cross-border pipeline into China. The pipeline began delivering natural gas in June 2013, becoming the first export of natural gas to China.

In June 2013, Guanghui signed a nonbinding letter of intent with Royal Dutch Shell to jointly develop an LNG import terminal at the coastal city of Qidong in Jiangsu province. Phase one of the project was the construction of a 600,000 t (590,000 long tons; 660,000 short tons) per year (tpy) storage and transit plant. Phase two included a 1.5 million tpy LNG import facility, and phased three a 3.5 million tpy import terminal. Shell backed out of the project in 2015, agreeing only to provide LNG to the terminal. Guanghui Energy went forward with the terminal anyway, building a 100,000 t (98,000 long tons; 110,000 short tons) berth and two 50,000 t (49,000 long tons; 55,000 short tons) storage tanks by June 2017, and one 160,000 t (160,000 long tons; 180,000 short tons) storage tank by December 2018. The reconfigured phase two added two 160,000 t (160,000 long tons; 180,000 short tons) storage tanks, a second 100,000 t (98,000 long tons; 110,000 short tons) berth, and a transshipment berth. Reconfigured phase three, intended to begin construction in 2022, included two 200,000 t (200,000 long tons; 220,000 short tons) storage tanks.

In August 2014, the Chinese government gave Guanghui Energy a crude license to import crude oil. It was the first private enterprise to obtain such a license from the government. The license gave Guanghui Energy the right to import up to 200,000 t (200,000 long tons; 220,000 short tons) of crude a year from its assets in Kazakhstan. By the end of 2014, Guanghui Energy was the second largest LNG producer in China.

=== Troubled projects ===
==== Texas property controversy ====
Guanghui Energy incorporated several subsidiaries in the United States in 2015. These included GH PacVest, a commercial real estate development company based in California; GHA Barnett, a natural gas producer in the Barnett Shale in Texas; Brazos Highland Properties and Harvest Texas, real estate companies in Texas; and GH America Investments Group. Through Brazos Highland and Harvest Texas, Guanghui Energy purchased 7 percent (140,000 acres (57,000 ha)) of all the land in Val Verde County, Texas, at a cost of roughly $110 million. GH America planned to build a wind farm on 15,000 acres (6,100 ha) near Laughlin Air Force Base, which would supply electricity to the Texas power grid. Concerns were raised that equipment installed on the solar and wind farms could be used for signals intelligence and electronic warfare on Laughlin Air Force Base. The project, the Blue Hills Wind Farm, passed national security reviews conducted by the United States Department of Defense and United States Department of Homeland Security. As the wind farm began construction in 2020, local residents raised environmental concerns with the state of Texas. The state, alarmed that a Chinese company with close ties to the CCP would have a connection to the state power grid, swiftly enacted the Lone Star Infrastructure Protection Act. The legislation prohibits any company owned by China, Iran, North Korea, or Russia, or one of their citizens, from connecting to any critical communications, cyber security, hazardous waste, power, or water treatment facility.

==== Plant fire and shutdown ====
In 2016, Guanghui Energy began to build an LNG facility and methanol plant near the city of Hami in eastern Xinjiang. The LNG facility was designed to store 500,000,000 t (490,000,000 long tons; 550,000,000 short tons) of liquified natural gas, and the methanol plant was to produce 12,000,000 t (12,000,000 long tons; 13,000,000 short tons) of methanol per year. A fire, caused by leaking natural gas, struck the two facilities in February 2017, causing construction to shut down.

=== New expansion ===
LNG greatly expanded its LNG capacity in September 2015 when it signed a deal with Petronas, a Malaysian oil and gas company. Petronas agreed to supply 600,000 t (590,000 long tons; 660,000 short tons) of LNG a year to Guanghui's Jiangsu terminal.

The company also continued to expand its role in the automobile industry. In December 2015, China Grand Automotive bought a 53.6 percent controlling stake in luxury car dealer Baoxin Auto Group for $1.06 billion. Baoxin, the country's biggest dealer of BMW cars, was China's leading luxury and ultra-luxury automotive sales group.

Guanghui Energy was already involved in coal-to-gas chemical conversion in a limited way by 2015. It built a coal gasification pilot plant in Fuyun County which was capable of producing 100,000 t (98,000 long tons; 110,000 short tons) of coal gas a year. A second plant, located in the East Junggar coalfield, was capable of producing 4,000,000,000 t (3.9×10^{9} long tons; 4.4×10^{9} short tons) of coal gas a year. In August 2017, the company received permission from the Chinese government to start a $441.93 million coal mining project in Xinjiang.

Carbon capture and storage (CCS) became an important research project for Guanghui as it moved into coal. Its coal gasification projects generated large amounts of carbon dioxide, and China was having difficulty finding an economically feasible carbon capture technology. In 2017, Guanghui Energy began a CCS pilot project in the Junggar oil fields. It signed an agreement Wuhuan Xinrui Chemical Company to use its food-grade liquid carbon dioxide capture technology to capture carbon dioxide emitted by the coal gasification plants. It then compressed, enriched, and liquified it before transporting it to the oilfield. A separate agreement with Central Asia Petroleum permitted Guangui Energy to pump the liquid carbon dioxide into exhausted oil pools, where it could be stored permanently. According to a 2017 preliminary study by Xinjiang University, the project was a success. Study authors said "With rich experience and mature technology, Guanghui Company has become the first choice for CCUS projects in Xinjiang."

Guanghui Energy also began a small-scale expansion into zinc mining. In 2017, it began construction of a lead-zinc mine at Mt. Huoshaoyun in Hetian County in Xinjiang. Once fully opened, it would be China's largest lead-zinc mine and the world's seventh-largest lead-zinc mine. A 2019 minerals survey discovered large lead-zinc deposits nearly 15 kilometres (9.3 mi) in every direction from the proposed mine.

Guanghui Energy signed an agreement in July 2018 with China Huadian Corporation, a major electrical utility, to build a new LNG facility near the city of Yueyang in Hunan province. The project won approval from the Hunan Provincial Development and Reform Commission in May 2019. Plant included two 8,000 t (7,900 long tons; 8,800 short tons) LNG discharge berths, a transshipment berth, and a 50,000 t (49,000 long tons; 55,000 short tons) LNG storage tank. Two years later, in April 2019, Guanghui and French oil and gas developer TotalEnergies signed a contract for TotalEnergies to supply 700,000 t (690,000 long tons; 770,000 short tons) of LNG a year to Guangui for 10 years. By 2019, the majority of LNG market share was held by China National Petroleum Corporation (a very large state-owned company) and Guanghui.

China Evergrande Group, the country's largest real estate developer, purchased 23.87 percent of the shares of Guanghui for $1 billion in September 2018. Evergrande also invested another $1.14 billion into the firm as capital. As part of the deal, the two companies agreed to strategic partnerships in automotive sales, energy, logistics, and real estate.

Guanghui received permission in February 2020 to build an LNG receiving station at the port city of Nantong. The project included construction of a 200,000 t (200,000 long tons; 220,000 short tons) LNG storage tank, LNG low pressure pumping station, and related facilities. The facility, located near Guanghui's existing LNG terminal at Qidong, would expand the company's LNG import capacity to 3,000,000 t (3,000,000 long tons; 3,300,000 short tons) per year and enable it to accommodate more LNG now that China had allowed foreign companies to export gas to the country. Phase four of the project was still under construction as of December 2021.

=== Post-pandemic activities ===
The COVID-19 pandemic created significant economic challenges worldwide. China Evergrande suffered significant cash flow problems, and sold its 40.96 percent stake in Guanghui Energy in November 2020 for $2.23 billion. The buyer was Shenergy Group, a state-owned investor in electricity, oil, and natural gas companies operating in China.

== Bibliography ==
- APEC Energy Working Group (September 2019). Small-Scale LNG in Asia-Pacific (PDF) (Report). Tokyo: Asia Pacific Energy Research Centre.
- Eberling, George (2017). China's Bilateral Relations With Its Principal Oil Suppliers. Lanham, Md.: Lexington Books. ISBN 9781498553322.
- Millward, James A. (2021). Eurasian Crossroads: A History of Xinjiang. New York: Columbia University Press. ISBN 9780231204545.
- Qingsan, Shi (14 December 2017). Xinjiang Guanghui Coal to Gas CCUS Pilot Project Prefeasibility Study (PDF) (Report). Ürümqi, Xinjiang, China: Xinjiang University.
