= List of ambassadors of China to Azerbaijan =

Ambassador of China to Azerbaijan
- National emblem of China

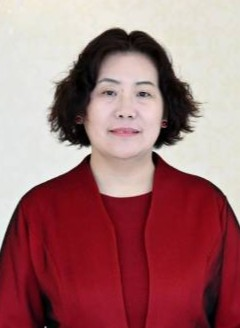
- Incumbent; Lu Mei since April 2025
- Inaugural holder: Xia Shuyuan
- Formation: 2 March 1993; 33 years ago

The ambassador of China to Azerbaijan is the official representative from the People's Republic of China to the Republic of Azerbaijan.

== History ==
On 30 August 1991, Azerbaijan declared independence from the Soviet Union, and China and Azerbaijan established diplomatic relations on July 1, 1992. The first ambassador was Xia Shunyun who took the position in February 1993 and prior served as the chargé d'affaires of the Chinese Embassy in Baku.

As of April 2025, the current ambassador is Lu Mei.

== List of representatives ==
Pinyin name (alternative name)	Chinese name	Title	Took office	Left office	Premier of China	President of Azerbaijan	Source
Xia Shunyun	夏树元	Ambassador	February 1993	July 1995	Li Peng	Abulfaz Elchibey; Heydar Aliyev	
Lei Yincheng	雷荫成	Ambassador	August 1995	August 1998	Li Peng; Zhu Rongji	Heydar Aliyev	
Zhang Guoqiang	张国强	Ambassador	September 1998	February 2002	Zhu Rongji	Heydar Aliyev	
Zhang Xiyun	张喜云	Ambassador	March 2002	October 2005	Zhu Rongji; Wen Jiabao	Heydar Aliyev; Ilham Aliyev	
Zhang Haizhou	张海舟	Ambassador	December 2005	March 2009	Wen Jiabao	Ilham Aliyev	
Zhang Yannian	张延年	Ambassador	April 2009	December 2011	Wen Jiabao	Ilham Aliyev	
Hong Jiuyin	宏九印	Ambassador	January 2012	May 2016	Wen Jiabao; Li Keqiang	Ilham Aliyev	
Wei Jinghua	魏敬华	Ambassador	June 2016	June 2019	Li Keqiang	Ilham Aliyev	
Guo Min	郭敏	Ambassador	July 2019	April 2024	Li Keqiang; Li Qiang	Ilham Aliyev	
Lu Mei	鲁梅	Ambassador	April 2025	Incumbent	Li Qiang	Ilham Aliyev	

== See also ==
- Azerbaijan-China relations
