= Shaan–Jing pipeline =

Natural gas pipeline in China

The Shaan–Jing pipeline is a natural gas pipeline in China, which runs from Jingbian County to Beijing and Tianjin.

== History ==
The construction of pipeline started in March 1996 and was completed on 10 September 1997. The Parallel Shaan-Jing Pipeline was completed and put into operation on 20 July 2005.

== Route ==
The first pipeline starts from the gas processing plant in Changqing gas field, in Shaanxi province, and terminates in the Yamenkou terminal in Shijingshan district, Beijing. It supplies natural gas to Shanxi, Hebei, Beijing and Tianjin. It also supplies The Cangzhou Fertilizer Plant and Shandong Zibo area through Gang-Cang and Cang-Zi lines.

The Parallel Shaan-Jing Pipeline is supplied from the Sulige Gas Field and it starts from the gas processing plant Yulin, Shaanxi. The pipeline runs via Shijiazhuang to Beijing. By the Ji-Ning branch between the Qingshan and Anping distributing stations the Parallel Shaan-Jing Pipeline is connected to the West–East Gas Pipeline. It is also connected with the underground gas storage of Dagang Oilfield by Gang-Jing line and Gang-Qing line.

== Technical features ==
The length of the pipeline is 918 kilometres (570 mi). The first pipeline has a diameter of 660 millimetres (26 in) and designed pressure of 6.4 MPa. The annual capacity of this pipeline is after several upgradings 4 billion cubic meters of natural gas. The pipeline includes three compressor stations and three underground storage facilities.

The length of the Parallel Shaan-Jing Pipeline is 935 kilometres (581 mi). It has a diameter of 1,016 millimetres (40 in) and designed pressure of 10 MPa. The capacity of the Parallel Shaan-Jing Pipeline is 12 bcm.

== Operator ==
The pipeline is operated by Beijing Huayou Gas Company. The Parallel Shaan-Jing Pipeline is operated by PetroChina.

== See also ==
- West–East Gas Pipeline
- Sichuan–Shanghai gas pipeline
- Zhongxian–Wuhan Pipeline
