= Turpan-Hami oil fields =

Oil fields in Xinjiang, China

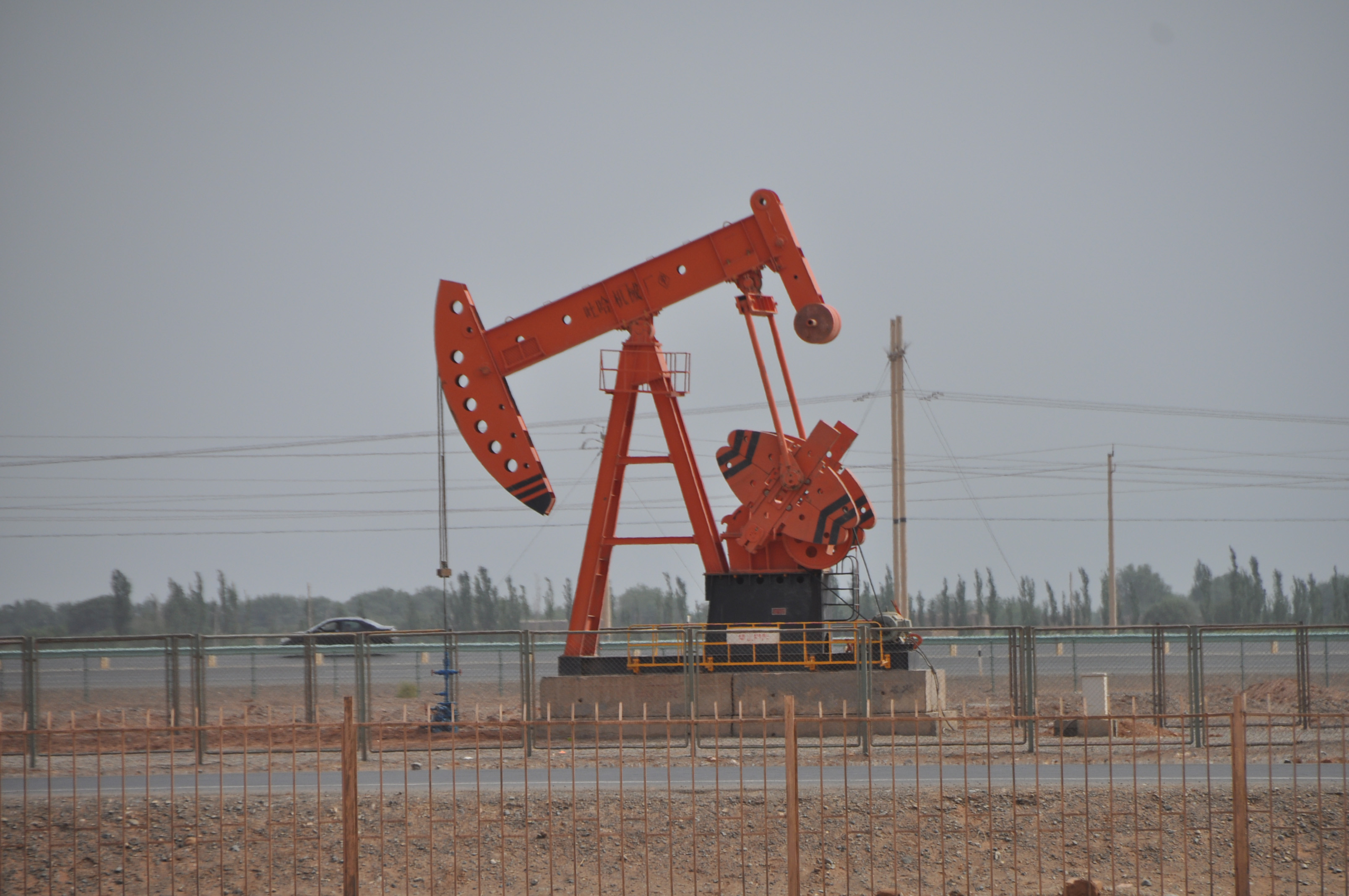
Drilling oil at one of the Turpan-Hami oil fields

The Turpan-Hami oil fields (Chinese: 吐哈油田) or the Tuha oil fields are the oil fields found in Turpan and Hami of Xinjiang Uyghur Autonomous Region, China. They are one of Xinjiang's three largest oil fields, the other two being Jungar and Tarim.

The Turpan-Hami oild field are managed by PetroChina's Tuha subsidiary. Their oil refinery is done in Turpan.

== See also ==
- Tuha Station (吐哈站) on Lanzhou–Xinjiang high-speed railway
- West–East Gas Pipeline
