= Sichuan–Shanghai gas pipeline =

Natural gas pipeline in China

Location
- Country: China
- Start: Pugang gas field
- To: Shanghai

General information
- Type: natural gas
- Operator: Sinopec
- Commissioned: 2010

Technical information
- Length: 1,702 km (1,058 mi)
- Maximum discharge: 12 bcm per year
- No. of compressor stations: 8

Sichuan–Shanghai gas pipeline (Chinese: 川氣東送) is a 1,702 kilometres (1,058 mi) long natural gas pipeline in China. The pipeline runs from Pugang gas field in Dazhou, Sichuan Province, to Qingpu District of Shanghai. An 842 kilometres (523 mi) long branch line connects Yichang in Hubei with Puyang in Henan Province. Two shorter branches are located near the Puguang gas field and one in the east near Shanghai.

The construction of the first 1,360 kilometres (850 mi) long section from Yichang in Hubei Province to Shanghai started on 22 May 2007 and was completed in March 2010. The tunnel to cross Yangtze River was completed in October 2007. The tunnel is about 20 metres (66 ft) beneath the riverbed and connects two wells on each side of the river.

The capacity of the pipeline is 12 billion cubic meters (bcm) of natural gas per year. It has eight centrifugal compressors, provided by GE Oil & Gas. The operator of the pipeline is Sinopec. Sinopec sold 50% stake of the operator to China Life Insurance Company and State Development & Investment Corporation.

== See also ==
- West–East Gas Pipeline
- Shaan–Jing pipeline
- Zhongxian–Wuhan Pipeline
