= Zhongxian–Wuhan Pipeline =

Natural gas pipeline in China

Location
- Country: China
- Start: Zhong County
- To: Wuhan

General information
- Type: Natural gas
- Construction started: 28 August 2003
- Commissioned: 1 July 2005

Technical information
- Length: 703 km (437 mi)
- Maximum discharge: 3 billion cubic metres (110×10^{9} cu ft) per annum
- Diameter: 711 mm (28 in)

The Zhongxian–Wuhan Pipeline is a natural gas pipeline, which connects Sichuan and Chongqing gas fields with consumers in Hubei and Hunan provinces.

== History ==
Preparations of the pipeline project started in 1998 and the project was fully launched in March 2001. The feasibility study was approved by the Chinese State Council on 13 November 2002. Construction of the pipeline started on 28 August 2003 and was completed on 1 July 2005.

== Route ==
The pipeline runs from Zhong County in Chongqing to Wuhan. The trunk pipeline has three branch pipelines from Jingzhou to Xiangfan, from Qianjiang to Xiangtan and from Wuhan to Huangshi and Huaiyang connecting it with the West–East Gas Pipeline. The length of pipeline is 703 kilometres (437 mi) and the total length together with branch pipelines is 1,347 kilometres (837 mi).

== Technical features ==
The pipeline has a diameter of 711 millimetres (28.0 in). The initial capacity is 3 billion cubic metres (110 billion cubic feet) per annum. It cost around 5 billion Chinese yuan.

== Operator ==
The pipeline is operated by PetroChina.

== See also ==
- Sichuan–Shanghai gas pipeline
- Shaan–Jing pipeline
