= Junggar oil fields =

Oil fields in Xinjiang, China

Coordinates: 45°36′N 84°52′E

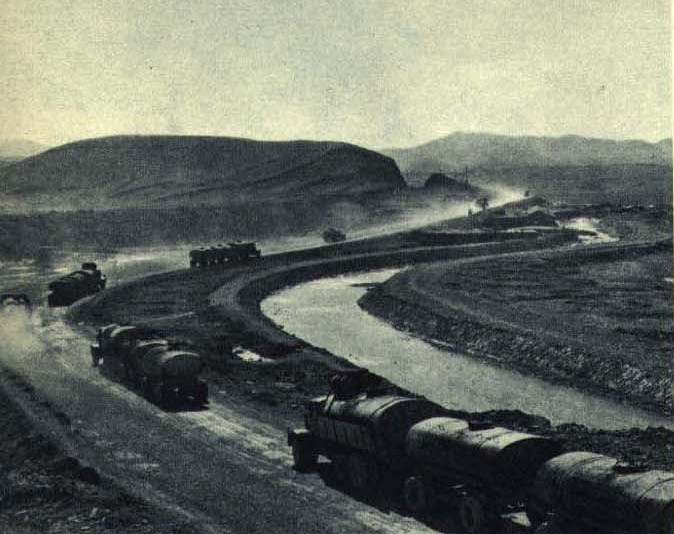
Transporting crude oil from the Karamay oil field of the Junggar oil fields (1962)

The Junggar or Dzungaria oil fields (Chinese: 準噶爾油田) are the oil and gas fields of northern Xinjiang Autonomous Region, China. They include the Karamay oil field in Karamay that started production in 1955.

The Junggar oil fields are one of the three largest oil fields in Xinjiang, the other two being the Tuha in the Turpan and Hami Basins, and the Tarim oil fields in the Tarim Basin. The Junggar fields include such oil fields as:

- Karamay oil field
- Mahe oil field (瑪河油田)

== See also ==
- Tarim oil fields
- Tuha oil fields
- West–East Gas Pipeline

== 外部リンク ==
- Oil fields in China
