= Tarim oil fields =

Oil fields in Xinjiang, China

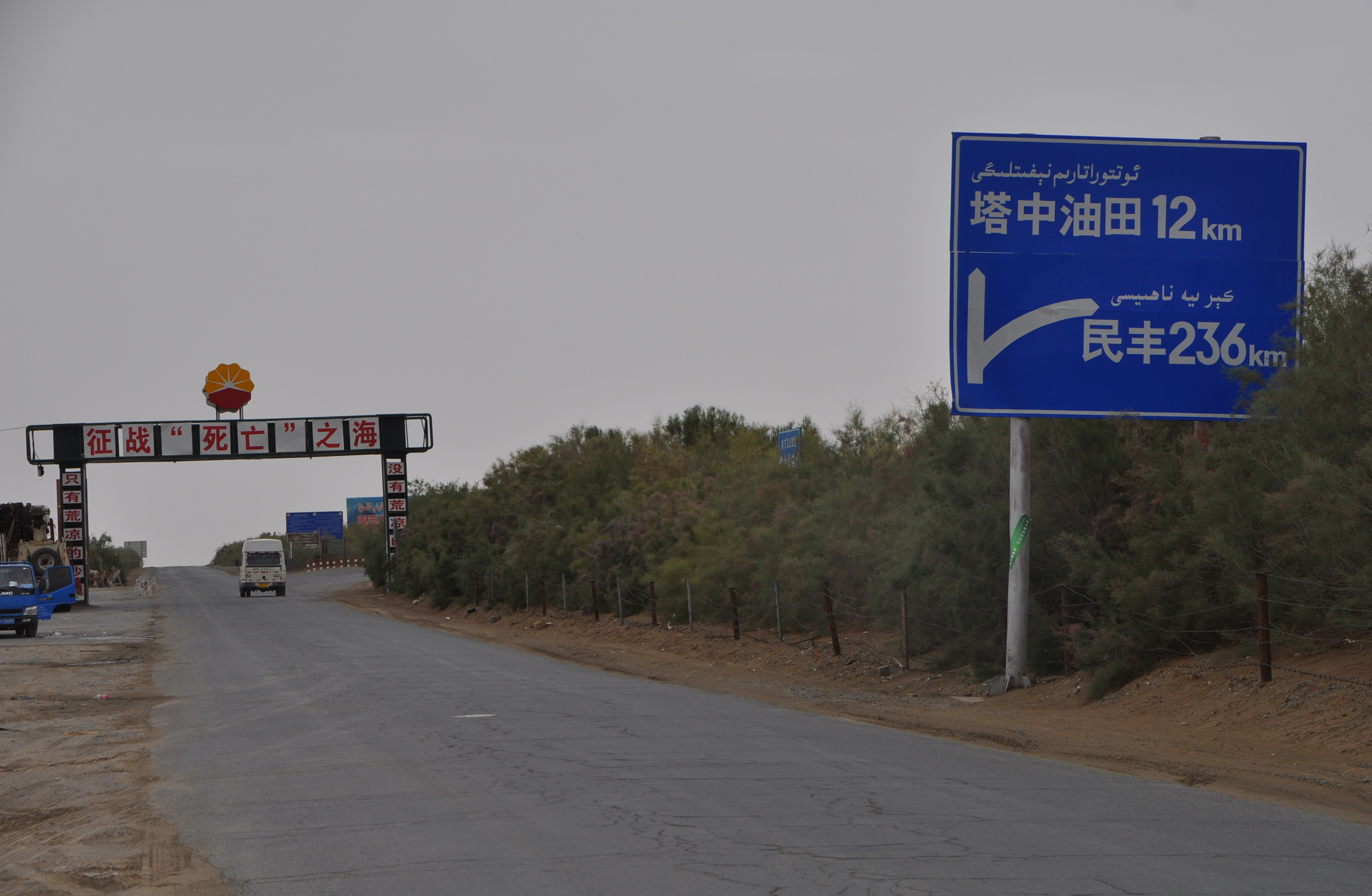
Straight to the Tazhong oil field on Lunmin Highway (Left to Minfeng County)

The Tarim oil fields (Chinese: 塔里木油田) are oil fields found in the Tarim Basin or the Taklamakan Desert in Xinjiang Uyghur Autonomous Region in China. The development of these oil fields was begun in the 1980s, and, with the completion of the transportation infrastructure, such as Tarim Desert Highway, their total oil output reached 5.000 million tons in 2002, and was the sixth largest oil field of China at that time. PetroChina's Tarim oil fields operations are headquartered in Korla.

The Tarim oil fields are one of Xinjiang's three largest oil fields, the other two being Jungar and Tuha. Tarim includes:

- Tahe oil field
- Tazhong oil field

== See also ==
- List of oil fields
- China Western Development
- West–East Gas Pipeline
