= Singapore Petroleum Company =

Singaporean oil company

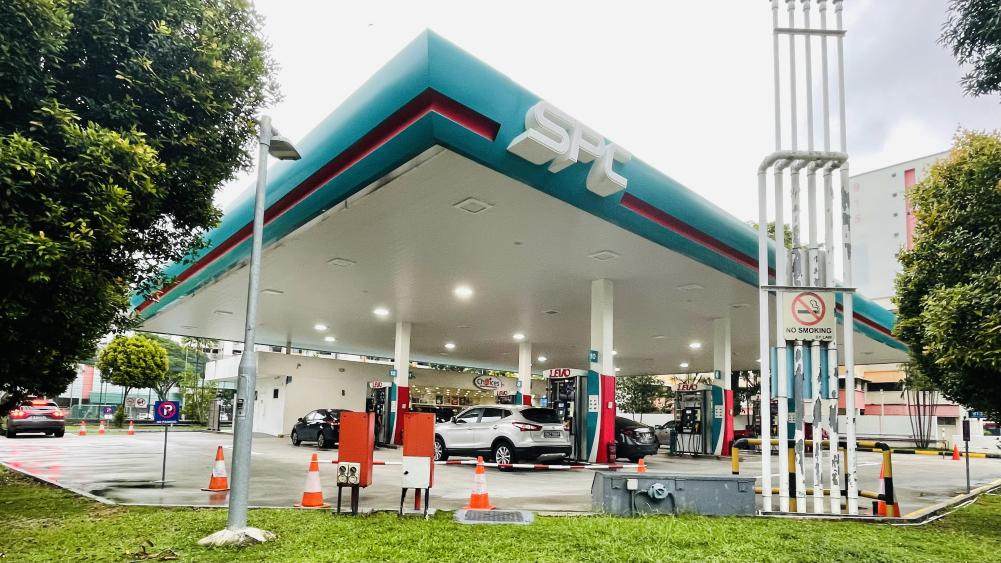
- A SPC station in November 2022
- Type: Private
- Industry: Oil; Petroleum Refining; Aviation
- Founded: 19 May 1969; 57 years ago in Singapore
- Headquarters: Singapore
- Parent: PetroChina
- Website: spc.com.sg

Logo used until 2019

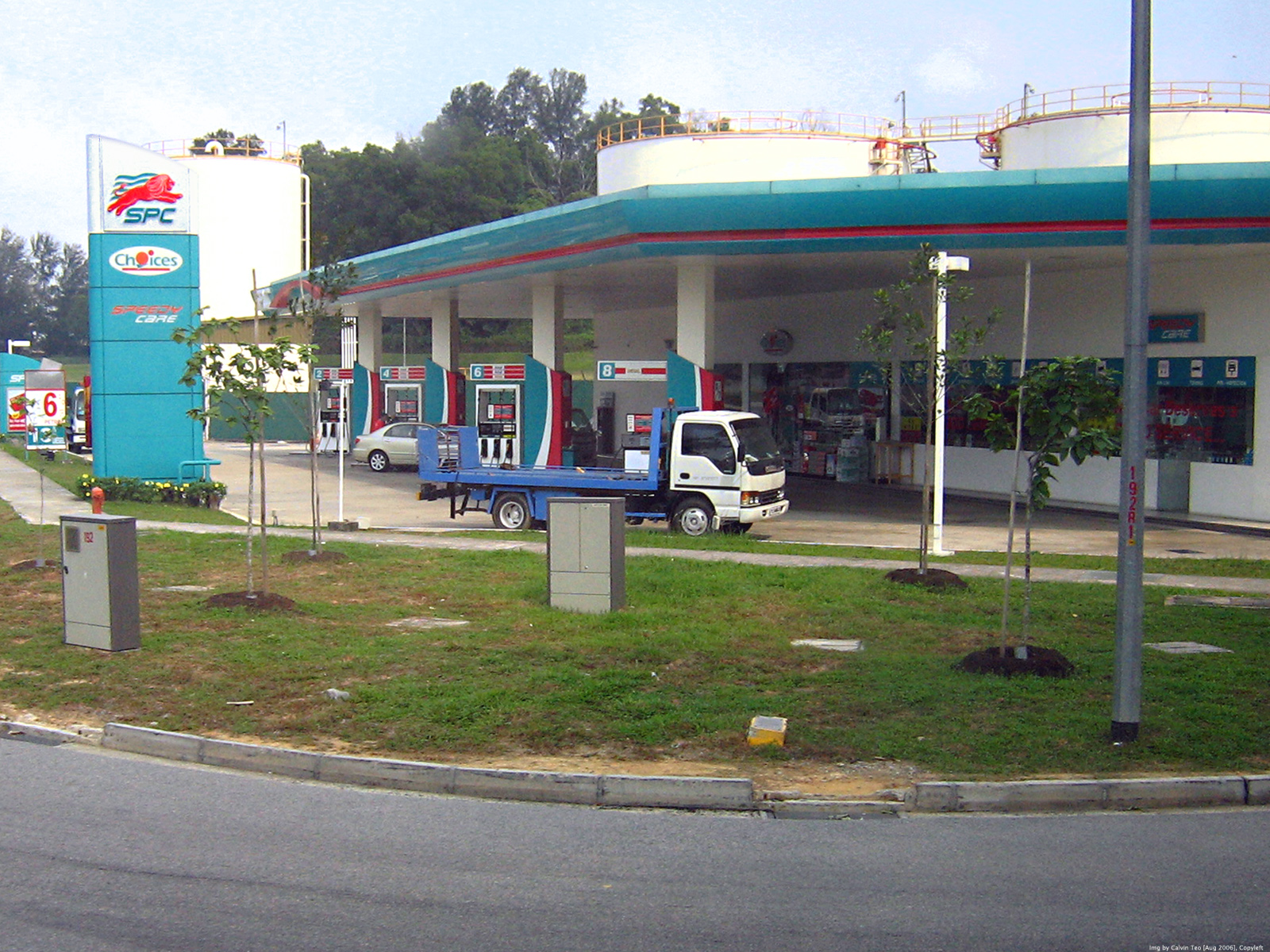
A SPC station in Jurong, 2006

Singapore Petroleum Company Limited, in short SPC, is a subsidiary of Chinese state-owned company PetroChina. It is involved in the exploration and production of petroleum, refining, trading and petroleum product distribution.

== History ==
The company was founded in 1969 as the Singapore Petroleum & Chemical Co. Pte Ltd and later changed its name to the Singapore Petroleum Company Ltd. The company is also a part-owner of Singapore Refining Company Pte Ltd which was founded in 1979.

In 2004, SPC acquired 50% of BP's interest in the SRC and BP's retail network of 28 stations and LPG business in Singapore. In 2009, SPC was acquired by China's PetroChina from Keppel Corporation and was delisted from the Singapore Stock Exchange. In 2019, SPC changed its logo to further integrate into the PetroChina brand and went over a company overhaul. A new visual identity was introduced incorporating logo elements of PetroChina.

== Exploration and Production ==
SPC's presence and profile in the regional E&P sector has grown with the acquisition of assets over the years. These assets include the Kakap Production Sharing Contract (PSC) and the Sampang PSC in Indonesia, Blocks 102 and 106 in Vietnam. In 2007, they expanded their assets to China with 2 additional blocks, 04/36 & 05/36 in Bohai Bay, offshore China.

In the pipeline business, SPC holds interests in three regional gas transmission pipelines. The 654-kilometre West Natuna Transportation System is the first Singapore cross border sub-sea gas pipeline carrying gas from the West Natuna Sea to Singapore. A consortium of PSC blocks in West Natuna including the Kakap PSC owns this pipeline.

The 468-kilometre Grissik-Batam-Singapore Pipeline is the second direct gas pipeline transmitting gas from Indonesia to Singapore. Gas to Singapore commenced in 2003 under a 20-year term contract between Singapore and Indonesia. The 536-kilometre Grissik-Duri Pipeline is a trunk line that transmit gas from the Grissik gas fields to Caltex's Duri facilities under long-term contracts that commenced in 1998.

== Refining, Supply and Trading ==
=== Refining ===
SPC, with equal partner Chevron Corporation (who also owns Caltex), owns half of the 285,000 barrels per day (45,300 m^{3}/d) Singapore Refining Company (SRC) plant, a complex refinery capable of cracking crude oil.

The refining of crude oil to petroleum products remains central to the Group's operations. Given the complexity of its refining facilities, SPC is able to refine heavy, medium and light crudes. SPC buys crudes from some 13 countries with the bulk of its supplies coming from the Middle East. The API gravity of these crudes ranges from 18 (mostly heavy/sour crude) to 45 (mostly light/sweet crudes). In 2006, the Group processed more than 51 million barrels (8,100,000 m^{3}) of crudes through SRC, its jointly owned refinery on Jurong Island.

=== Supply ===
The Company owns a storage terminal for petroleum products at Pulau Sebarok to support its marine bunker operations and trading and marketing activities. The 220,000 cubic metres terminal consisting of 13 tanks is equipped with a deep water jetty up to 160,000 tonnes displacement.

=== Trading ===
The trading unit actively trades in a variety of distillate and residual products which include Naphtha, Gasoline, Automotive Diesel Oil, Jet Fuel and Fuel Oil.

The Aviation Sales unit markets and supplies aviation fuel to airlines at four international airports in Singapore, Hong Kong, Bangkok, and Taipei. SPC is a supplier of aviation fuel in the Asia-Pacific region.

The Distillates unit is responsible for the sales and trading of naphtha, motor gasoline (petrol), gasoil (diesel) and jet fuel (kerosene).

The Residue unit is responsible for fuel oil trading and marine sales activities. Fuel oil of various specifications, including standard bunker grades, is sourced directly from SRC as well as from the Group's extensive network of global oil traders.

In 2006, more than 74.1 million barrels (11,780,000 m^{3}) of crude and refined petroleum products were handled in these downstream product channels. Of this volume, slightly more than 50.0 million barrels (7,950,000 m^{3}) were products sourced directly from SRC with the balance of more than 24.0 million barrels (3,820,000 m^{3}) sourced from the Group's extensive network of oil majors, multinational oil traders and national oil companies.

== Financial ==
Singapore Petroleum Company or SPC was delisted from the Singapore Exchange on 22 October 2009 when Chinese oil giant PetroChina completed its takeover of the Singapore firm.
