= Madian, Hebei =

Madian 马店镇
- Town
- Location in Hebei
- Coordinates: 38°19′9″N 115°24′46″E
- Country: People's Republic of China
- Province: Hebei
- Prefecture-level city: Hengshui
- County: Anping County
- Time zone: UTC+8 (China Standard)

Madian (simplified Chinese: 马店; traditional Chinese: 馬店; pinyin: Mǎdiàn) is a town under the administration of Anping County, Hebei, China. As of 2018, it has 31 villages under its administration.
