= Sun Guangxin =

Chinese businessman (born 1962)

- Born: 1962 (age 63–64); Ürümqi, Xinjiang, China
- Education: Chinese Academy of Social Sciences; Tianjin University
- Occupation: Businessman
- Organization: All-China Federation of Industry and Commerce
- Title: Founder of Xinjiang Guanghui Industry Investment Group
- Political party: Chinese Communist Party
- Children: 3

Sun Guangxin (Chinese: 孙广信; born 1962) is a Chinese businessman.

== Early life ==
Sun was born in 1962 in Xinjiang, China, with his ancestral home in Pingdu, Shandong. He received a Master of Arts from the Chinese Academy of Social Sciences, and an EMBA from Tianjin University. He joined the People's Liberation Army (PLA) and retired as a captain in 1989.

== Career ==
In 1989, Sun founded Xinjiang Guanghui Industry Investment Group under the name Ürümqi Guanghui Industry and Trade Company. Initially, Sun opened a restaurant that served fresh seafood imported daily from the coast. Historian James A. Millward says that sources vary as to where he got the funds for his business. Not only was fresh seafood a novelty in Ürümqi, it was favored by government and business elites. Sun began making extensive connections in government, the Chinese Communist Party (CCP), and oil and banking industry executives. He opened a series of entertainment venues in Ürümqi, including the city's first bowling alley, discothèque, karaoke bar, and swimming pool. As his business interests grew, Sun employed many former army officers in key positions. During the collapse of the Soviet Union, the company began importing oil and gas drilling equipment from Russia and selling it to state-owned enterprises in China.

In 1993, Sun was investigated for bribery.

Working closely with the state, Sun's company grew into a conglomerate with interests on natural gas, real estate and auto distribution. China Grand Auto, which is controlled by Guanghui Group, became the largest auto dealer in China. According to Sun, "Guanghui functions like a great state-owned enterprise."

=== Texas property controversy ===
In 2021, Sun's plan to build solar and wind farms on a 140,000-acre ranch in Val Verde County, Texas were stopped when the Texas Legislature passed a law, the Lone Star Infrastructure Act, preventing it from connecting to the grid due to national security concerns. Concerns were raised that equipment installed on the solar and wind farms could be used for signals intelligence and electronic warfare on Laughlin Air Force Base. Despite the law, Sun declared his intention to lease the land, held by subsidiaries of Guanghui (GH America Energy and Brazos Highland Properties), to other companies to build and operate solar panels. Local ranchers sued Electric Reliability Council of Texas (ERCOT) in 2023 to halt the project. Sun's company filed a lawsuit against ERCOT in 2024 to advance the project.
