= Lu Mei (diplomat) =

Chinese diplomat

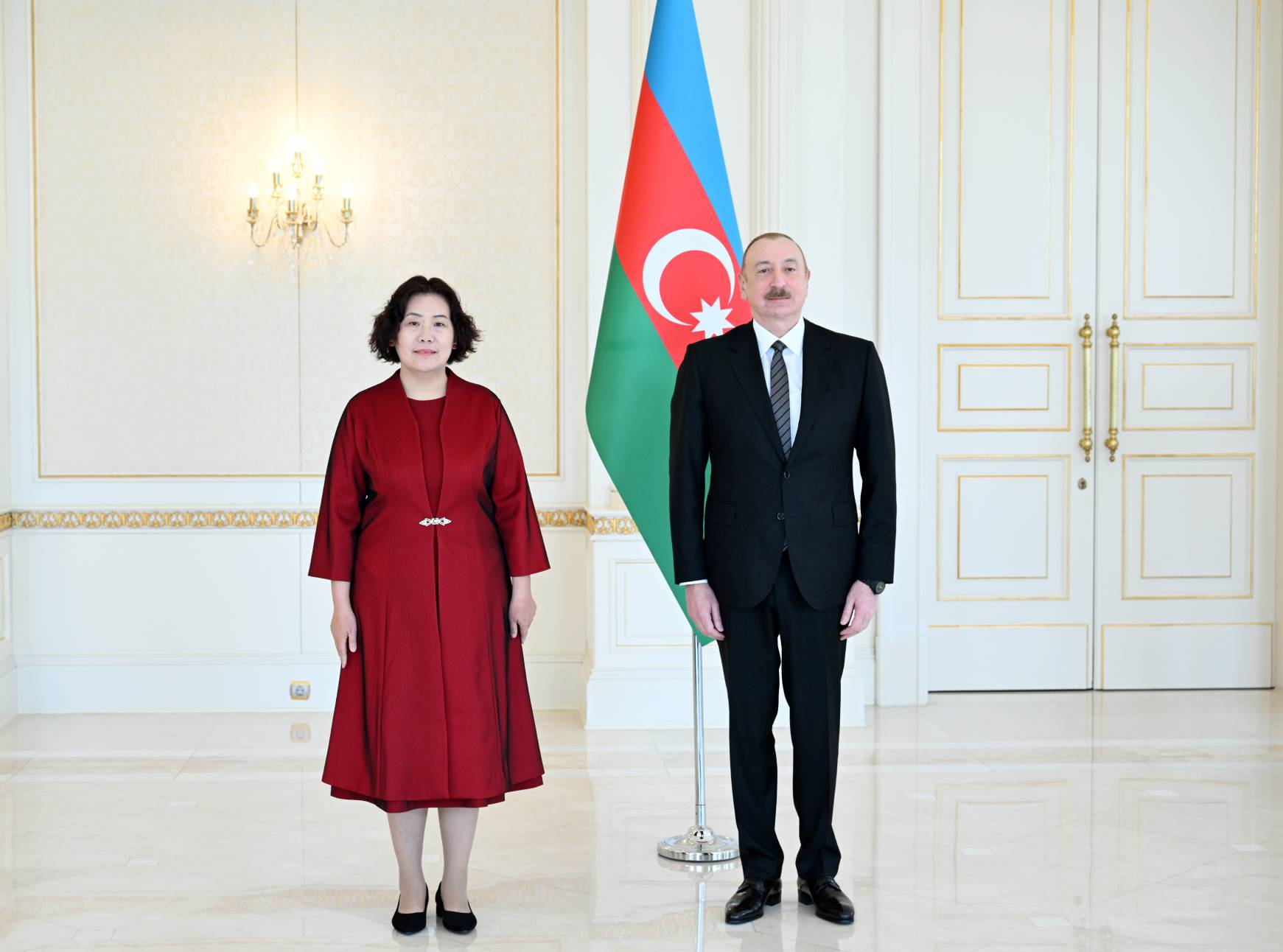
Lu Mei (left) in 2025

Lu Mei (Chinese: 鲁梅; pinyin: Lǔ Méi, born in January 1973) is a diplomat of the People's Republic of China, who is currently serving as the Chinese ambassador to Azerbaijan since April 2025.

== Career ==
Lu Mei previously served as a Counselor to the Permanent Mission of China to the United Nations, and Counselor, then into Deputy Director-General, of the Department of International Economic Affairs of the Ministry of Foreign Affairs. In 2025, she was appointed as Chinese ambassador to Azerbaijan.
