= Dahezhuang Township =

Dahezhuang Township 大何庄乡
- Rural Township
- Dàhézhuāng Xiāng
- Location in Hebei Location in China
- Coordinates: 38°16′57″N 115°25′07″E
- Country: People's Republic of China
- Province: Hebei
- Prefecture-level city: Hengshui
- County: Anping

Area
  - Total: 56.02 km^{2} (21.63 sq mi)

Population (2010)
  - Total: 32,399
  - Density: 578.3/km^{2} (1,498/sq mi)
- Time zone: UTC+8 (China Standard)

Dahezhuang Township (Chinese: 大何庄乡; pinyin: Dàhézhuāng Xiāng) is a rural township located in Anping County, Hengshui, Hebei, China. According to the 2010 census, Dahezhuang Township had a population of 32,399, including 16,497 males and 15,902 females. The population was distributed as follows: 4,805 people aged under 14, 23,602 people aged between 15 and 64, and 3,992 people aged over 65.

== See also ==
- List of township-level divisions of Hebei
