= Guo Min =

Chinese politician and diplomat

- 郭敏
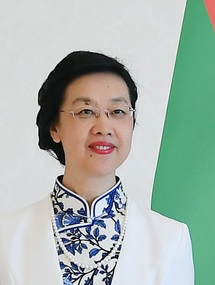
- Guo in 2019

Chinese Ambassador to Azerbaijan
- In office July 2019 – April 2024
- Preceded by: Wei Jinghua
- Succeeded by: Lu Mei

Consul-General of the People's Republic of China in Saint Petersburg
- In office September 2015 – June 2019
- Preceded by: Ji Yanchi
- Succeeded by: Wang Wenli

Consul-General of the People's Republic of China in Irkutsk
- In office October 2007 – January 2012
- Preceded by: Position established
- Succeeded by: Guo Zhijun

Personal details
- Born: October 1963 (age 62) Botou, Hebei, China
- Party: Chinese Communist Party

Guo Min (Chinese: 郭敏) is a Chinese diplomat who served as the Chinese ambassador to Azerbaijan from 2019 to 2024. She previously served as Chinese consul general in the Russian cities of Irkutsk from 2007 to 2012 and Saint Petersburg from 2015 to 2019.

== Early life ==
Born in 1963 in the city of Botou in Hebei, Guo majored in Russian language at the Department of Foreign Languages and Literatures of Jilin University.

== Diplomatic and political career ==
In 1985, she joined the Ministry of Foreign Affairs and on the same year, she was appointed as staff member of the Consular Department within the ministry. From 1988 to 1989, she served as the staff member and attaché of the Consular Department and from 1989 to 1991, she served as the attaché and third secretary of the visa office of the ministry in Hong Kong. In 1991, Guo was appointed as the third secretary of the department of consular affairs within the ministry. From 1994 to 1997, she was assigned to the Embassy of China in Moscow where she served as the third secretary and second secretary. From 1997 to 2000, she served as the second secretary, deputy director and first secretary of the Consular Department. Guo served as the first secretary and counselor at the Embassy of China in Moscow, from 2000 to 2005. She served as the counselor and director of the consular department from 2005 to 2007.

In 2007, the Ministry of Foreign Affairs opened a consulate general in the Russian city of Irkutsk and Guo was appointed as the consul general, making her the first consul general of the People's Republic of China in Irkutsk. Other than Irkutsk, the Chinese consulate also had consular jurisdiction in the Russian regions of Zabaykalsky Krai, Tuva, Buryatia and Khakassia. She served as the consul general in Irkutsk till 2011. Upon her return to China, she was appointed as counselor of the Department of Foreign Affairs Management within the Ministry of Foreign Affairs.

In 2013, she was appointed as the deputy mayor of the city of Nanning in Guangxi Zhuang Autonomous Region, China. During her tenure, there were interactions between Guangxi and Taiwanese business communities in 2014 and in 2015, a work conference regarding tourism in Nanning was held where tourist agencies, hotel and scenic spots which contributed to the tourism in the city were awarded by the municipal government. In July 2014, she reported on the development of Nanning's tourism industry on behalf of the Municipal People's Government to a research team composed of deputies to the National People's Congress and the Autonomous Region People's Congress in Liuzhou. In 2015, she stepped down as deputy mayor.

In 2015, she was appointed as consul general to Saint Petersburg, Russia. In 2019, she was appointed as the Chinese ambassador to Azerbaijan and on 23 July, she handed her credentials to President of Azerbaijan Ilham Aliyev. During her tenure as ambassador, in the aftermath of the Second Nagorno-Karabakh War in 2020 between Azerbaijan and Armenia, Azerbaijani media reported that in a July 2021 interview Guo said that the controversial Zangezur corridor would contribute to China's Belt and Road initiative. Following coverage of her remarks by Armenian media, the Chinese ambassador to Armenia Fan Yong denied that Guo made such remarks following discussions with her. Guo's tenure as ambassador ended in April 2024.

Diplomatic posts
Preceded by Wei Jinghua (魏敬华)	Chinese Ambassador to Azerbaijan; 2019–2024	Succeeded by Lu Mei (鲁梅)
