= West–East Gas Pipeline =

Set of natural gas pipelines in China

Location
- Country: China
- Direction: West to East
- Start: Khorgos
- Passes through: Xinjiang; Gansu; Ningxia; Shaanxi; Henan; Hubei; Hunan; Jiangxi; Fujian; Guangdong
- To: Fuzhou

General information
- Type: natural gas
- Status: In operation
- Owner: PetroChina West–East Gas Pipeline Company
- Operator: incumbent
- Pipe manufacturer: Vyksa Steel Works Vyksa, Russia; Chelyabinsk Pipe Rolling Plant Chelyabinsk, Russia; Izhora Pipe Mill St Petersburg, Russia; Volzhsky Pipe Plant Volzhsky, Volgograd Oblast, Russia; Zagorsk Pipe Plant Sergiyev Posad, Russia; Pipe Innovative Technologies Moscow, Russia
- Construction started: January 1, 2005 (20 years ago)
- Commissioned: December 30, 2004 (21 years ago)

Technical information
- Length: 7,378 km (4,584 mi)

The West–East Gas Pipeline (Chinese: 西气东输) is a set of natural gas pipelines which run from the western part of China to the east. The pipeline was a major project of the China Western Development campaign.

== PetroChina Pipelines ==
PetroChina Pipelines is a subsidiary (72.26%) of PetroChina that managed the first three pipelines of the project.

== First Operation ==
The pipeline was a major project of the China Western Development campaign. The pipeline connected China's east to western gas reserves and facilitated access to gas from Central Asia.

=== History and Timeline ===
The construction of the West–East Gas Pipeline started in 2002. The pipeline was put into trial operation on October 1, 2004, and the full commercial supply of natural gas commenced on January 1, 2005. The pipeline is owned and operated by PetroChina West–East Gas Pipeline Company, a subsidiary of PetroChina. Originally, it was agreed that PetroChina would have owned 50% of the pipeline, while Royal Dutch Shell, Gazprom, and ExxonMobil had been slated to hold 15% each, and Sinopec 5%. However, in August 2004, the Board of Directors of PetroChina announced that following good faith discussions with all parties to the Joint Venture Framework Agreement, the parties had not been able to reach an agreement, and the joint venture framework agreement was terminated.

=== Technical features ===
The 4,000-kilometre (2,500 mi) long pipeline runs from Lunnan in Xinjiang to Shanghai. The pipeline passes through 66 cities in the ten provinces in China. Natural gas transported by the pipeline is used for electricity production in the Yangtze River Delta area. There is a plan to replace coal with gas in Shanghai by 2010. The capacity of the pipeline is 12 billion cubic metres (420 billion cubic feet) of natural gas annually. The cost of the pipeline was US$5.7 billion. By the end of 2007, the capacity was planned to be upgraded to 17 billion cubic metres (600 billion cubic feet). For this purpose, ten new gas compressor stations will be built and eight existing stations are to be upgraded.

=== Connections ===
The West–East Gas Pipeline is connected to the Shaan-Jing pipeline by three branch pipelines. The 886-kilometre (551 mi) long Ji-Ning branch between the Qingshan Distributing Station and the Anping Distributing Station became operational on 30 December 2005.

=== Source of supply ===
The pipeline is supplied from the Tarim Basin oil and gas fields in Xinjiang province. The Changquing Gas Area (CGA) in Shaanxi province is a secondary gas source. In the future, the planned Kazakhstan-China gas pipeline will be connected to the West–East Gas Pipeline.

Starting from 15 September 2009, the pipeline is also supplied with coalbed methane from the Qinshui Basin in Shanxi.

== Second Operation ==
Construction of the second West–East Gas Pipeline started on 22 February 2008. The pipeline with a total length of 9,102 kilometres (5,656 mi), including 4,843 kilometres (3,009 mi) of the main line and eight sub-lines, will run from Khorgas in northwestern Xinjiang to Guangzhou in Guangdong. Up to Gansu, it will be parallel and interconnected with the first west-east pipeline. The western part of the pipeline is expected to be commissioned by 2009, and the eastern part by June 2011.

The capacity of the second pipeline is 30 billion cubic metres (1.1 trillion cubic feet) of natural gas per year. It is mainly supplied by the Central Asia-China gas pipeline. The pipeline is expected to cost US$20 billion. The project is developed by China National Oil and Gas Exploration and Development Corp. (CNODC), a joint venture of China National Petroleum Corporation and PetroChina.

== Third Operation ==
Construction of the third pipeline started in October 2012 and it is to be completed by 2015. The third pipeline will run from Khorgos in western Xinjiang to Fuzhou in Fujian. It will cross Xinjiang, Gansu, Ningxia, Shaanxi, Henan, Hubei, Hunan, Jiangxi, Fujian, and Guangdong provinces.

The total length of the third pipeline is 7,378 kilometres (4,584 mi), including a 5,220-kilometre (3,240 mi) trunkline and eight branches. In addition, the project includes three gas storages and a LNG plant. It will have a capacity of 30 billion cubic metres (1.1 trillion cubic feet) of natural gas per year with operating pressure of 10–12 megapascals (1,500–1,700 psi). The pipeline will be supplied from Central Asia–China gas pipeline's Line C supplemented by supplies from the Tarim basin and coalbed methane in Xinjiang. Compressors for the pipeline are supplied by Rolls-Royce.

== Fourth and Fifth Operation ==
The fourth pipeline will start from the Tarim Basin or from Sichuan.

== See also ==
- Sichuan–Shanghai gas pipeline
- Shaan–Jing pipeline
- Zhongxian–Wuhan Pipeline
