= Huoshaoyun =

Mountain in Xinjiang with significant lead-zinc deposit

- Location within Southern Xinjiang Location within Ladakh
- Interactive map of Huoshaoyun
- Location: West Kunlun Mountains (Aksai Chin), Xinjiang, China (Claimed by India as part of Leh District); 34°36′30″N 79°9′00″E
- Products: lead-zinc
- Production: 2.5 million metric tons (2.8×10^{6} short tons) (annual capacity)
- Type: open-pit
- Discovered: 2015-2016
- Opened: 2024
- Company: Guanghui Energy

Huoshaoyun (Chinese: 火烧云; pinyin: Huǒshāoyún) is a mountain and a Chinese-operated mine with significant lead-zinc deposit in the disputed region of Aksai Chin region administered by China as Hetian County, Xinjiang. The discovery of the mineral deposit was published in academic journal in 2015 and commercially announced in 2016. The development of the site into a mining operation started in 2017. The mine is owned by Guanghui Energy. It is expected to come online between 2020-2022. It is expected to become world's 7th largest lead-zinc mine.

In 2019, on-site survey discovered nearby mountains to include sufficient deposits to warrant future development.

Mining started in 2024.

== See also ==
- List of locations in Aksai Chin § Outposts
- Lhünzê County § Mining Controversy
