= Chengyouzi Township =

Chengyouzi Township 程油子乡
- Rural Township
- Chéngyóuzi Xiāng
- Location in Hebei Location in China
- Coordinates: 38°17′50″N 115°35′21″E
- Country: People's Republic of China
- Province: Hebei
- Prefecture-level city: Hengshui
- County: Anping

Area
  - Total: 61.59 km^{2} (23.78 sq mi)

Population (2010)
  - Total: 36,007
  - Density: 584.7/km^{2} (1,514/sq mi)
- Time zone: UTC+8 (China Standard)

Chengyouzi Township (Chinese: 程油子乡; pinyin: Chéngyóuzi Xiāng) is a rural township located in Anping County, Hengshui, Hebei, China. According to the 2010 census, Chengyouzi Township had a population of 36,007, including 18,287 males and 17,720 females. The population was distributed as follows: 5,508 people aged under 14, 26,806 people aged between 15 and 64, and 3,693 people aged over 65.

== See also ==
- List of township-level divisions of Hebei
