= Zhong Tian Plaza =

Coordinates: 43.7986°N 87.6055°E

China CITIC Bank Mansion
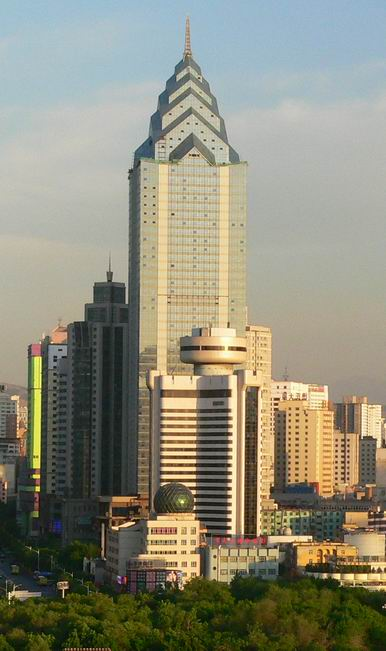
- Interactive map of the China CITIC Bank Mansion area

General information
- Location: North Xinhua Road, Ürümqi, Xinjiang, China
- Construction started: 2001
- Completed: 2008
- Owner: China CITIC Bank

Height
- Antenna spire: 229 m (751 ft)

Technical details
- Floor count: 59
- Floor area: 91,000 m^{2} (980,000 sq ft)
- Lifts/elevators: 24

Design and construction
- Developer: Xinjiang Guanghui Industry Investment Group

China CITIC Bank Mansion (Chinese: 中信银行大厦), formerly Zhong Tian Plaza (Chinese: 中天广场) is a 59-floor/229-meter tall skyscraper in Ürümqi, Xinjiang, People's Republic of China. It is the tallest building in Northwestern China It was noted for having a similar design to One Liberty Place in Philadelphia, Pennsylvania, US.

== See also ==
- List of tallest buildings in China
