= Pugang gas field =

Natural gas field in Sichuan, China

Pugang
- Country: China
- Region: Sichuan
- Offshore/onshore: onshore
- Operator: China National Petroleum Corporation

Field history
- Discovery: 2006
- Start of production: 2007

Production
- Current production of gas: 35×10^{6} m^{3}/d 1,000×10^{6} cu ft/d 3.65×10^{9} m^{3}/a (129×10^{9} cu ft/a)
- Estimated gas in place: 356×10^{9} m^{3} 12.46×10^{12} cu ft

The Pugang gas field is a natural gas field located in Sichuan, China. Discovered in 2006, it was developed by the China National Petroleum Corporation, determining it to have initial total proven reserves of around 12.46 trillion ft^{3} (356 km^{3}). It began production of natural gas and condensates in 2007, with a production rate of around 1 billion ft^{3}/day (35×10^{5} m^{3}).
