= Tahe oil field =

Oil field in Xinjiang, China

Tahe
- Country: China
- Region: Xinjiang
- Offshore/onshore: onshore
- Operator: China National Petroleum Corporation

Field history
- Discovery: 1990
- Start of production: 1990

Production
- Estimated oil in place: 600 million tonnes (~ 677×10^{6} m^{3} or 4260 million bbl)

The Tahe oil field (Chinese: 塔河油田) is an oil field located in Xinjiang. It was discovered in 1990 and developed by China National Petroleum Corporation. It began production in 1990 and produces oil. The total proven reserves of the Tahe oil field are around 4.26 billion barrels (600 million tonnes), and production is centered on 100,000 barrels per day (16,000 m^{3}/d).

The Tahe oil field is a part of the Akekule Arch which is located in the North Uplift of the Tarim Basin. This area experienced two events of karstification which affected the Ordovician strata. The paleokarst reservoirs constituting the Tahe oil field were mostly formed by the younger, early Hercynian karstification. The oil field contains multiple caves filled with sediments, collapse breccias, and chemical fills. Sediments and collapsed breccias are characteristic for the reservoir run-off zone, whereas vadose zone is characterized by high-angle fractures and epikarst zone is characterized by weathering residues and dissolution fractures. The paleogeomorphological results indicate that paleokarst structures formed mostly in highlands and slopes during the Hercynian karstification event.
