= Azerbaijan–China relations =

- Azerbaijan: China

Diplomatic mission
- Azerbaijani Embassy, Beijing: Chinese Embassy, Baku

Diplomatic relations between the Republic of Azerbaijan and the People's Republic of China were established on April 2, 1992. The relations between the two countries have developed smoothly with high-level exchanges taking place. The PRC embassy in Baku openly commends Azerbaijan for supporting its stance on the political status of Taiwan, Tibet's sovereignty, the conflict in Xinjiang, and the suppression of Falun Gong. All Azerbaijani political forces have actively advocated strengthening friendly cooperation with China, which was one of the first countries to recognize Azerbaijan's independence, and has supported the country on the issue of Nagorno-Karabakh.

In 1999, the two sides held the first meeting of the China-Azerbaijan Intergovernmental Economic and Trade Cooperation Committee and held the sixth meeting in 2016.

The two sides have cooperated smoothly in the fields of education, culture, science and technology, sports, tourism and media. The two sides cooperated in the opening of two Confucius Institutes.

== History ==
The exchanges between China and Azerbaijan can be traced back some 2,000 years ago. The Silk Road, which started from Chang'an in the east and led to Europe through Azerbaijan, played an important role in the development of cultural exchanges between the East and the West. Azerbaijani poets in the 12th century created literary works about China. During the Yuan Dynasty, the Mongolian army conquered many places, and Chinese medicine was spread to Azerbaijan.

During the Soviet period, the relationship between China and Azerbaijan was part of the Sino-Soviet relationship. The Soviet Azerbaijan State Song and Dance Troupe once visited China for a two-month performance. Azerbaijani experts sent by the Soviet Union helped China build its oil industry, with the Karamay Oilfield being one example. In early 1961, the First Secretary of the Communist Party of Azerbaijan Vali Akhundov met with a delegation from the Sino-Soviet Friendship Association and the two sides held talks. As Sino-Soviet relations deteriorated, the relationship between China and Azerbaijan came to a standstill.

=== 1992-2000 ===
After the disintegration of the Soviet Union, Azerbaijan became independent. The two countries established diplomatic relations on April 2, 1992, and China established the Chinese Embassy in Azerbaijan in August of the same year. From March 7 to 10, 1994, the President of Azerbaijan Heydar Aliyev visited China. The two sides signed eight documents, including the "Joint Statement on the Foundations of Sino-Azerbaijani Friendly Relations". During the visit, President Aliyev held talks with Chinese leader Jiang Zemin and Chinese Premier Li Peng, and exchanged views on bilateral political, economic and trade relations, the Nagorno-Karabakh conflict and other major international issues.

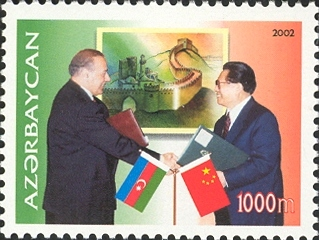
Azerbaijan's commemorative stamp shows the signing of the "Joint Declaration on the Foundations of Sino-Azerbaijani Friendly Relations" by Azerbaijan President Heydar Aliyev and Chinese leader Jiang Zemin in March 1994

On March 7–10, 1994, President of Azerbaijan Heydar Aliyev made a work trip to the People's Republic of China. He has met with the General Secretary of the Chinese Communist Party, Jiang Zemin, and Premier of China Li Peng. 8 agreements were signed between the two countries during the visit. At the meeting, leaders signed a joint statement on the basis of improving the friendly ties between the PRC and Azerbaijan. Several agreements on opening the air route between the two countries, cooperation in the scientific, technical, cultural, medical sphere, television, and tourism fields have also been signed.

On March 8, Heydar Aliyev met with the Premier of the People's Republic of China Li Peng.

In addition to political relations, there are also cultural relations between the two eastern countries. According to the agreement on cultural cooperation signed between Azerbaijan and China, an exhibition of works by famous Azerbaijani artist Sattar Bahlulzade was opened at Beijing International Exhibition Center on April 12–21, 1995.

April 17–18, 1996, Deputy Prime Minister of the People's Republic of China Jiang Jemin visited Azerbaijan and met with Heydar Aliyev.

From August 27 to 30, 1997, the delegation headed by Deputy Chairman of the People's Representatives Assembly of the PRC Wang Bingqian paid a visit to Azerbaijan. During the visit, meetings on strengthening economic cooperation between the two countries, further development of relations between the parliaments of Azerbaijan and China were held. The Chinese People's Assembly delegation provided $60,000 in technical assistance to the parliament.

=== 2000-present ===
In March 2005, Azerbaijani President Ilham Aliyev paid a state visit to China. On August 7, 2008, President of Azerbaijan Ilham Aliyev visited China to attend the opening ceremony of the 2008 Summer Olympics in Beijing. In May 2014, Aliyev arrived in China to attend the Fourth Summit of the Conference on Interaction and Confidence Building Measures in Asia, and held talks with General Secretary of the Chinese Communist Party Xi Jinping on May 20. Both sides highly praised each other's contributions to the international regional order and economic development.

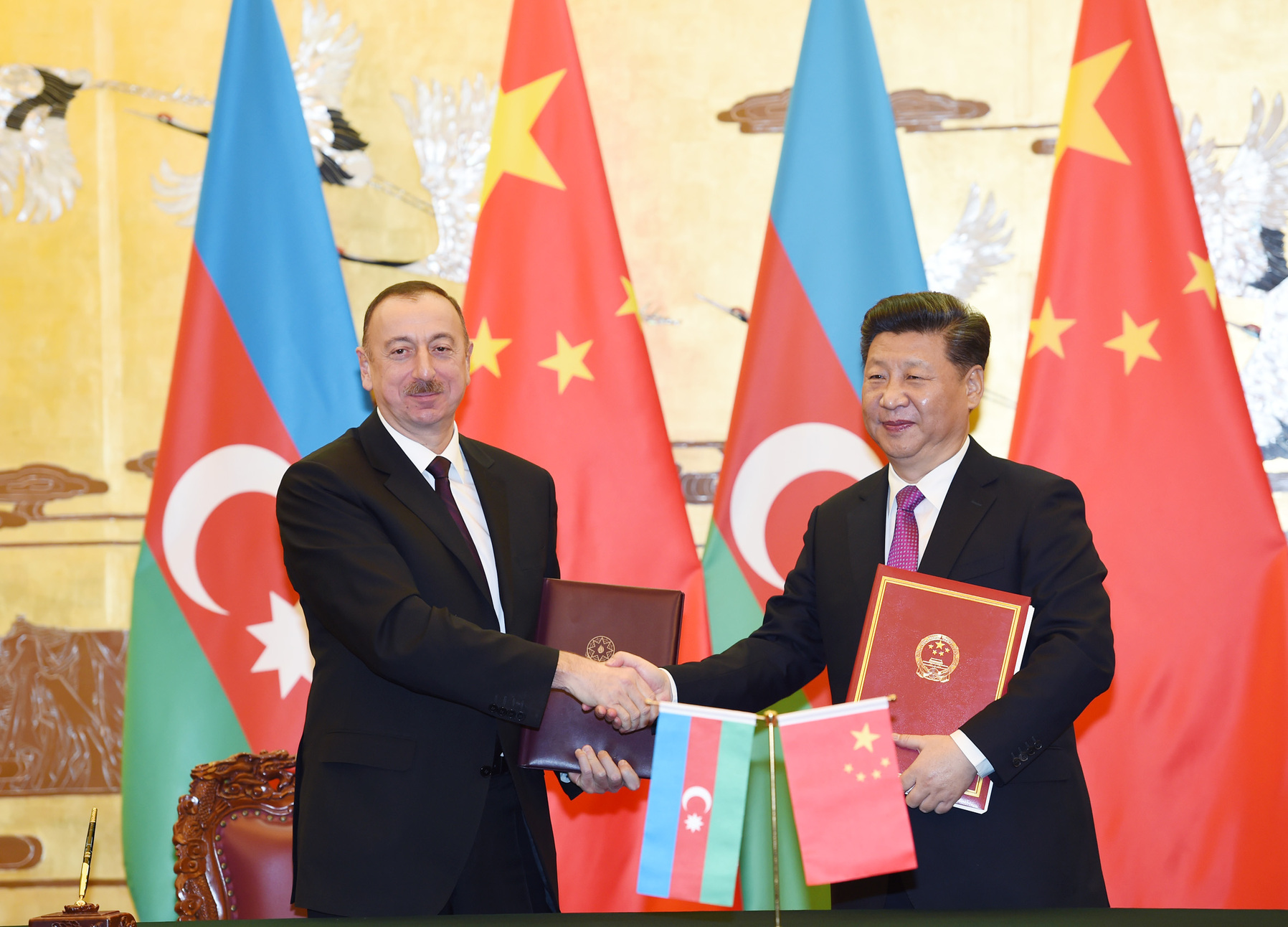
Ilham Aliyev meeting with Chinese leader Xi Jinping in 2015

In 2015, Azerbaijan stated it recognized Taiwan as a part of China, while China stated it recognized that Nagorno-Karabakh was part of Azerbaijan. In 2015, Azerbaijan joined the Belt and Road Initiative while President Ilham Aliyev was visiting China.

In May 2016, CCP General Secretary Xi Jinping's special envoy, secretary of the CCP Central Political and Legal Affairs Commission Meng Jianzhu visited Azerbaijan. On June 2 of the same year, Zhang Gaoli, Vice Premier of the State Council, visited Azerbaijan and met with Azerbaijani President Aliyev in Baku. In June 2018, Azerbaijan National Assembly Chairman Asadov visited China. In May 2019, Chinese State Councilor and Foreign Minister Wang Yi visited Azerbaijan. In September, Chairman of the Standing Committee of the National People's Congress Li Zhanshu visited Azerbaijan. In October, Azerbaijani Deputy Prime Minister Abtalybov came to China to attend the closing ceremony of the 2019 Beijing Expo.

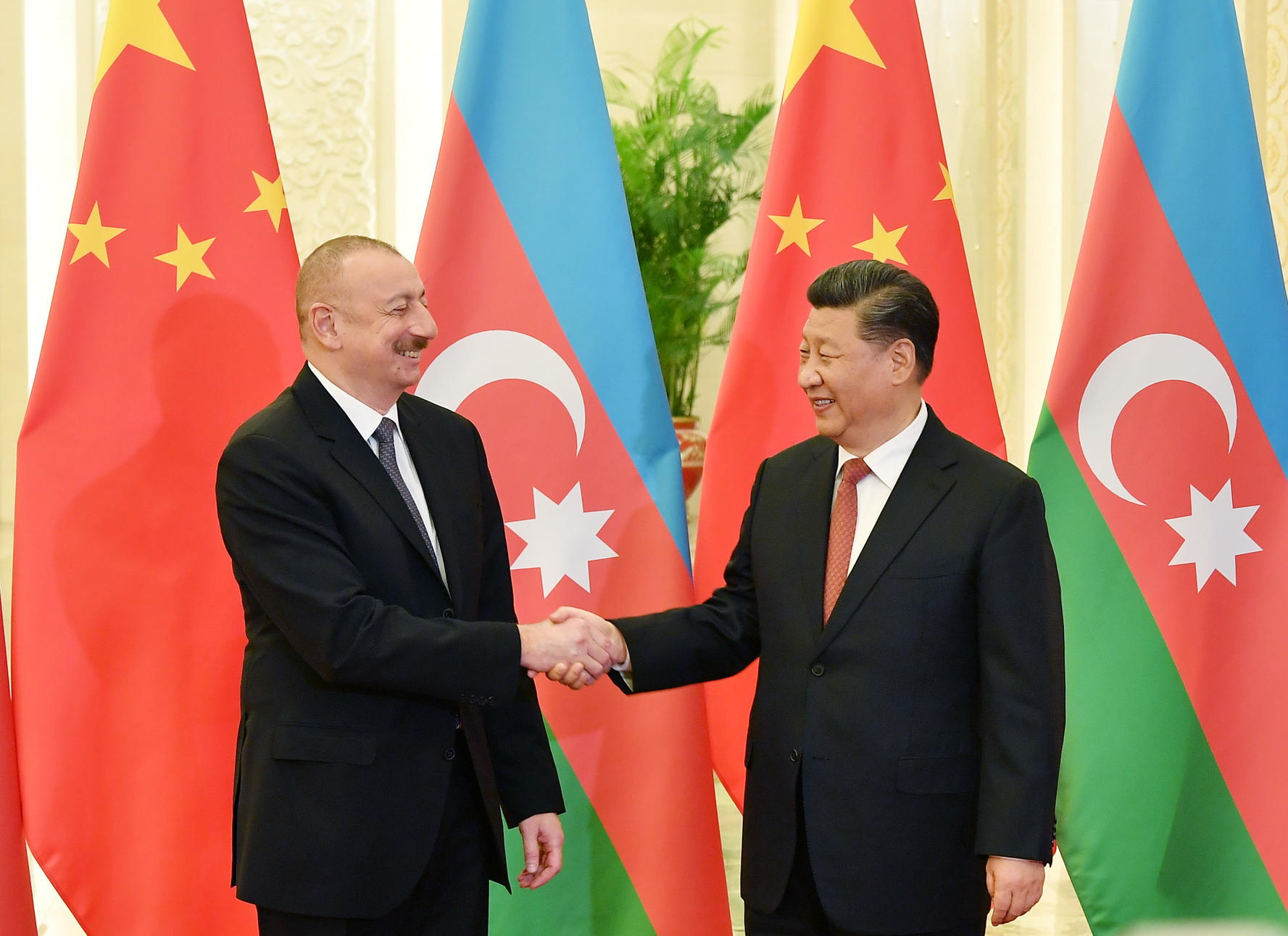
Ilham Aliyev meeting with Chinese leader Xi Jinping in 2019

On 25 April 2019, Azerbaijan and China signed a document worth $821 million with the participating co-chair of the Azerbaijan-China Intergovernmental Trade and Economic Cooperation Commission, head of the Eurasia Department of the Ministry of Commerce. The signing ceremony of documents between Azerbaijani and Chinese companies was held within the framework of the “One Belt One Road” international forum in Beijing, China.

On 2 June 2021, in a phone call, Azerbaijani President Ilham Aliyev congratulated CCP general secretary Xi Jinping and wished the Chinese Communist Party (CCP) on its upcoming 100th anniversary of its founding on 1 July 2021.

On April 2, 2022, the leaders of China and Azerbaijan exchanged congratulatory messages on the 30th anniversary of the establishment of diplomatic relations between the two countries. In July 2024, the two countries established a strategic partnership. On April 23, 2025, China and Azerbaijan established a comprehensive strategic partnership. On August 31, 2025, a meeting was held between Azerbaijan and China to advance their comprehensive strategic partnership.

== High level visits ==
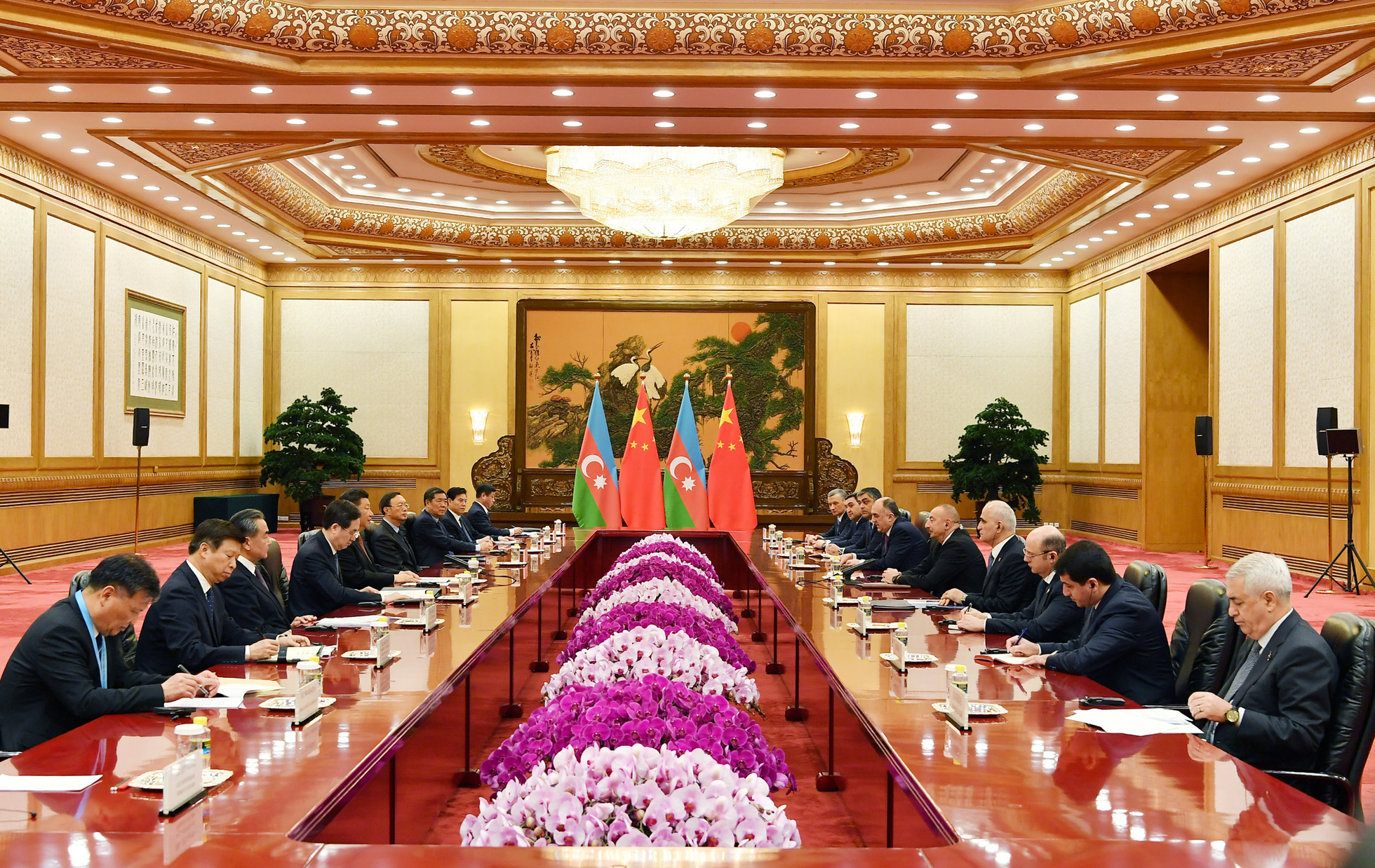
On April 24, 2019, Azerbaijani President Ilham Aliyev visited China and held talks with Chinese leader Xi Jinping at the Great Hall of the People

President Aliyev visited China in August 2008 and May 2014 to attend the opening ceremony of the Beijing Olympic Games and the fourth summit of the Asia Cooperation and Confidence Measures Conference. In March 2005 and December 2015, he twice went to China for state affairs. access. In June 2018, the President of the National Assembly, Assador, visited China. In May 2016, Special Envoy of Chinese Communist Party (CCP) general secretary Xi Jinping, member of the Political Bureau of the CCP Central Committee and Secretary of the CCP Central Political and Legal Affairs Commission Meng Jianzhu visited Afghanistan. In June of the same year, Zhang Gaoli, member of the Standing Committee of the Political Bureau of the CCP Central Committee and Vice Premier of the State Council, visited Azerbaijan.

On August 31, 2025, President of Azerbaijan Ilham Aliyev met with President of the People's Republic of China Xi Jinping in Tianjin, China. The meeting took place within the framework of the SCO Plus Summit and coincided with ceremonies and a military parade held to mark the 80th anniversary of China’s victory against foreign military aggression and fascism. During the discussions, both sides addressed the development of Azerbaijan–China relations at the level of a comprehensive strategic partnership, the increase in bilateral trade volume, and cooperation within the frameworks of the Belt and Road and Middle Corridor initiatives. The parties also explored opportunities to expand collaboration in renewable energy and digitalization. President Aliyev expressed Azerbaijan’s support for China’s positions on the issues of Taiwan, Hong Kong, and the Xinjiang Uyghur Autonomous Region. The leaders additionally discussed mutual support within international organizations and the impact of visa-free travel arrangements on tourism.

== Taiwan ==
Azerbaijan follows the one China principle, and recognizes government of the People's Republic of China as the sole legal government representing the whole of China and Taiwan as "an inalienable part" of China. Azerbaijan also supports all efforts by the PRC to "achieve national reunification" and opposes Taiwan independence.

== Economic relations ==
Since the establishment of diplomatic relations between China and Azerbaijan, the two countries signed the Agreement between the Government of the People's Republic of China and the Government of the Republic of Azerbaijan on the Encouragement and Mutual Protection of Investment in 1994. In 1999, the two sides established the China-Azerbaijan Intergovernmental Economic and Trade Cooperation Committee as a bilateral cooperation mechanism between China and Azerbaijan, and held its first meeting in the same year. After 2000, the bilateral trade volume between the two countries grew rapidly, with a growth rate of 100 to 200% from 2000 to 2003. In 2006, the bilateral trade volume between the two countries reached US$368 million. In 2005, the two sides signed the Agreement on Economic and Trade Cooperation between the Government of the People's Republic of China and the Government of the Republic of Azerbaijan, the Memorandum of Understanding on Cooperation between the Ministry of Information Industry of the People's Republic of China and the Ministry of Communications and Information Technology of the Republic of Azerbaijan, the Agreement between the Government of the People's Republic of China and the Government of the Republic of Azerbaijan on the Avoidance of Double Taxation and the Prevention of Fiscal Evasion with Respect to Income, and the Agreement between the Government of the People's Republic of China and the Government of the Republic of Azerbaijan on Mutual Assistance in Customs Matters. As of 2011, China was Azerbaijan's 12th largest trading partner. Chinese products can be found everywhere in Azerbaijan's markets, and daily necessities produced in China have become the first choice of residents. In December 2015, Ilham Aliyev visited China. Chinese leader Xi Jinping held talks with President Ilham Aliyev. The two heads of state jointly signed the "China-Azerbaijan Joint Statement on Further Developing and Deepening Friendly and Cooperative Relations" and witnessed the signing of the "China-Azerbaijan Memorandum of Understanding on Jointly Promoting the Construction of the Silk Road Economic Belt" and bilateral cooperation documents in the fields of economy and trade, justice, civil aviation, education, transportation, energy, etc.

Since 2002, Chinese oil companies have had two development rights projects in Azerbaijan. Chinese companies are also engaged in oil drilling services in Azerbaijan, and their business volume is growing. However, the cooperation between the two countries in the oil and gas field is relatively small. China National Electric Equipment Corporation has contracted some engineering projects in Azerbaijan. As of the end of 2007, the total contract value of Chinese companies contracting projects in Azerbaijan through bidding was about US$500 million. There are also Chinese people running businesses in Azerbaijan, including catering and health care product marketing. From 2004 to mid-2011, 40 Chinese companies were registered in Azerbaijan, and there were 16 Chinese companies in Azerbaijan.

In 2015, the two countries signed the Memorandum of Understanding of the Silk Road Economic Belt between China and Azerbaijan, which has provided opportunities for cooperative development.

Following the signing of the 2017 Memorandum of Understanding on Investment and Financing Cooperation between CNPC, China Development Bank and SOCAR for Azerbaijan Natural Gas Chemical Project, Azerbaijan has sought to strengthen its position in the Belt and Road Initiative's Energy Silk Road.

In 2020, affected by the Second Nagorno-Karabakh War and the COVID-19 pandemic, China-Azerbaijan bilateral trade volume reached US$1.847 billion, down 15.4%, or US$337 million. Of this, Azerbaijan imported US$1.414 billion and exported US$433 million. During the reporting period, China was Azerbaijan's fourth largest trading partner (accounting for 7.6% of Azerbaijan's trade volume), the third largest source of imports (accounting for 13.2% of Azerbaijan's total imports), and the ninth largest export destination (accounting for 3.2% of total exports).

Azerbaijan is an important economic link for China's increasing westward connectivity through the China-Central Asia-West Asia Economic Corridor (CCAWAEC). This helps facilitate an alternative land route from China to Europe which avoids Russian territory.

As of 2023, Azerbaijan is the largest market in the South Caucasus for Chinese goods. Although a small market by Chinese standards, Azerbaijan is a large market by comparison to other South Caucasus countries.

== Cultural relations ==
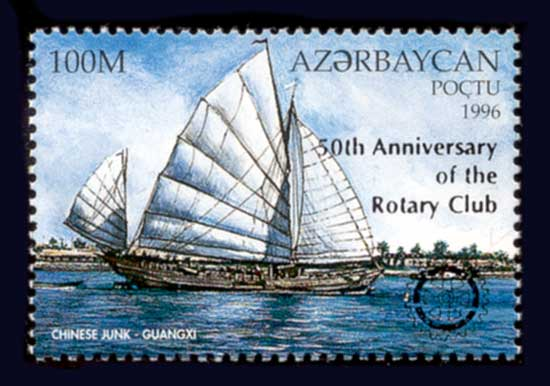
Azerbaijan stamp featuring a Chinese sailing ship

There are strong diplomatic and cultural ties between the two countries. Azerbaijan has a Confucius Institute at Baku State University, jointly established by Anhui University and Baku State University, where Azerbaijani citizens can learn Chinese and traditional Chinese customs; since 2004, China has provided scholarships to Azerbaijani students. In the same year, China's rhythmic gymnastics and boxing teams went to Azerbaijan to participate in competitions, and Azerbaijan's teams also participated in international competitions and art festivals in China. On May 24, 2011, China held the "Azerbaijan Culture Day" event. The opening ceremony was held at the National Museum of China. Vice Minister of Culture Zhao Shaohua attended the opening ceremony and met with Azerbaijan's Minister of Culture Garayev and his delegation. On the evening of December 11, 2012, the opening ceremony of Azerbaijan's "China Culture Day" was held at the Azerbaijan National Theatre.

To commemorate the 20th anniversary of the establishment of diplomatic relations between the two countries, the two governments issued commemorative coins and stamps. The two countries' news agencies (such as News Agency and Xinhua News Agency) maintain a cooperative relationship. Azerbaijan has also been continuously exploring the aviation tourism market in China. For example, the Beijing route opened by Azerbaijan Airlines is its first long-distance route, and the Baku-Istanbul flight has also become a choice for some Chinese passengers traveling to Turkey. On the evening of March 18, 2018, the National Grand Theater and the Embassy of Azerbaijan in China jointly organized the "Azerbaijan Night", inviting Azerbaijani artists to perform Azerbaijani traditional music "Mukham" and excerpts from Azerbaijani national operas.

== Military relations ==
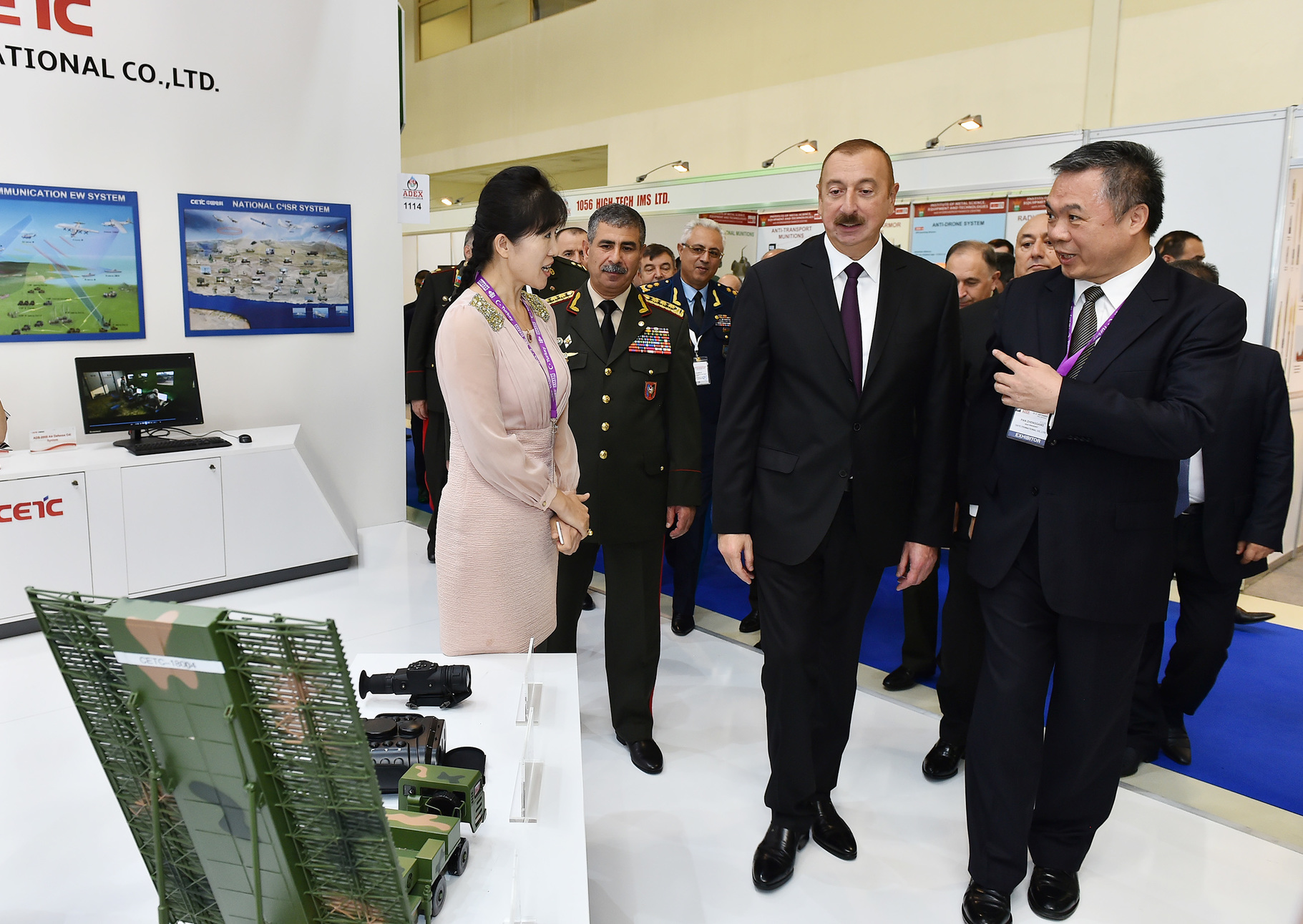
Azerbaijan President Aliyev visits the China Electronics Technology Group booth at the 3rd Azerbaijan International Defense Exhibition (ADEX 2018)

In 2005, the chairman of the Azerbaijan Veterans Association and others were invited to attend the important commemoration of the 60th anniversary of the Second Sino-Japanese War. In 2007 and 2008, the two countries had active exchanges in the military field. The Chief of the General Staff of the Azerbaijani Armed Forces, General Nadimykin Sadykov, visited China, and Major General Ding Jingong, deputy director of the Foreign Affairs Office of the Ministry of National Defense of the People's Republic of China, also met with the Minister of Defense of Azerbaijan, General Safar Abiyev.

In 2011, the two countries signed an international agreement, under which China provided Azerbaijan with RMB 6 million in free military aid; in January 2013, the Azerbaijani Ministry of Defense and the Chinese Ministry of Defense signed an agreement, under which China provided Azerbaijan with another RMB 3 million in military aid. In July 2014, the Chinese Language and Culture Center of the Azerbaijan University of Languages organized a seminar on military diplomacy between the two countries to commemorate the establishment of the two countries' armed forces. During the seminar, Liu Hong, the military attaché of the Chinese Embassy in Azerbaijan, gave a speech on the military situation of China. Azerbaijan and China's military purchase orders also progressed step by step.

== Medical assistance ==
On January 16, 2021, Azerbaijan's presidential assistant Movsumov announced that the first batch of COVID-19 vaccines produced by China's Sinovac (4 million doses of Sinovac COVID-19 vaccine) had arrived in Azerbaijan. On January 18, Azerbaijan began vaccinating its people with this vaccine. Azerbaijan's Minister of Health Ogtay Shiraliyev was the first to receive the Sinovac COVID-19 vaccine. On February 1, Azerbaijan began the second phase of large-scale vaccination with the Chinese COVID-19 vaccine. On March 21, the two countries signed a new vaccine procurement cooperation agreement, with China providing 5 million doses of vaccine to Azerbaijan. On April 1, a batch of Sinovac vaccines arrived in Baku, Azerbaijan. Deputy Foreign Minister Hasanov, Deputy Health Minister Gasimov, and Chinese Ambassador to Azerbaijan Guo Min went to the airport to welcome them.

== Resident diplomatic missions ==
- Azerbaijan has an embassy in Beijing.
- China has an embassy in Baku.

== See also ==
- Foreign relations of Azerbaijan
- Foreign relations of China
