= Karamay oil field =

Oil field in Xinjiang, China

Karamay
- Country: China
- Region: Xinjiang
- Offshore/onshore: onshore
- Operator: China National Petroleum Corporation

Field history
- Discovery: 1955
- Start of production: 1955

Production
- Estimated oil in place: 423 million tonnes (~ 500×10^{6} m^{3} or 3000 million bbl)

The Karamay oil field is an oil field located in Xinjiang. It was discovered in 1955 and developed by China National Petroleum Corporation. It began production in 1955 and produces oil. The total proven reserves of the Karamay oil field are around 3 billion barrels (423 million tonnes), and production is centered on 290,000 barrels per day (46,000 m^{3}/d).

== History ==
In 1951, the China-Soviet Petroleum Company began preliminary surveys and exploration.

On October 29, 1955, the No. 1 exploration well in the Hei You Shan area on the northwest edge of the Junggar Basin in Xinjiang (Karamay No. 1 Well) gushed industrial oil.

In 1956, trial production started with an annual crude oil output of 16,000 tons.

By 1960, Karamay's annual crude oil production reached 1.636 million tons, accounting for 39% of China's total natural petroleum output that year.

On November 9, 1991, the Mazhuang gas field began development.

On March 22, 2000, the Baikouquan Oilfield's Bai Zhong 7 well area was officially put into production.

On December 22, 2002, Karamay Oilfield's annual crude oil production surpassed 10 million tons.

== Production ==
- In 2010, the Karamay Oilfield produced 10.89 million tons of crude oil, with a daily average of 222,000 barrels; newly built crude oil capacity totaled 1.3225 million tons; natural gas production reached 3.8 billion cubic meters.
- In 2015, crude oil production reached 11.8 million tons; natural gas production was 3.14 billion cubic meters.
- In 2020, crude oil production reached 13.2 million tons; natural gas production was 3.63 billion cubic meters.
