= PetroChina =

Chinese oil producer

PetroChina Company Limited

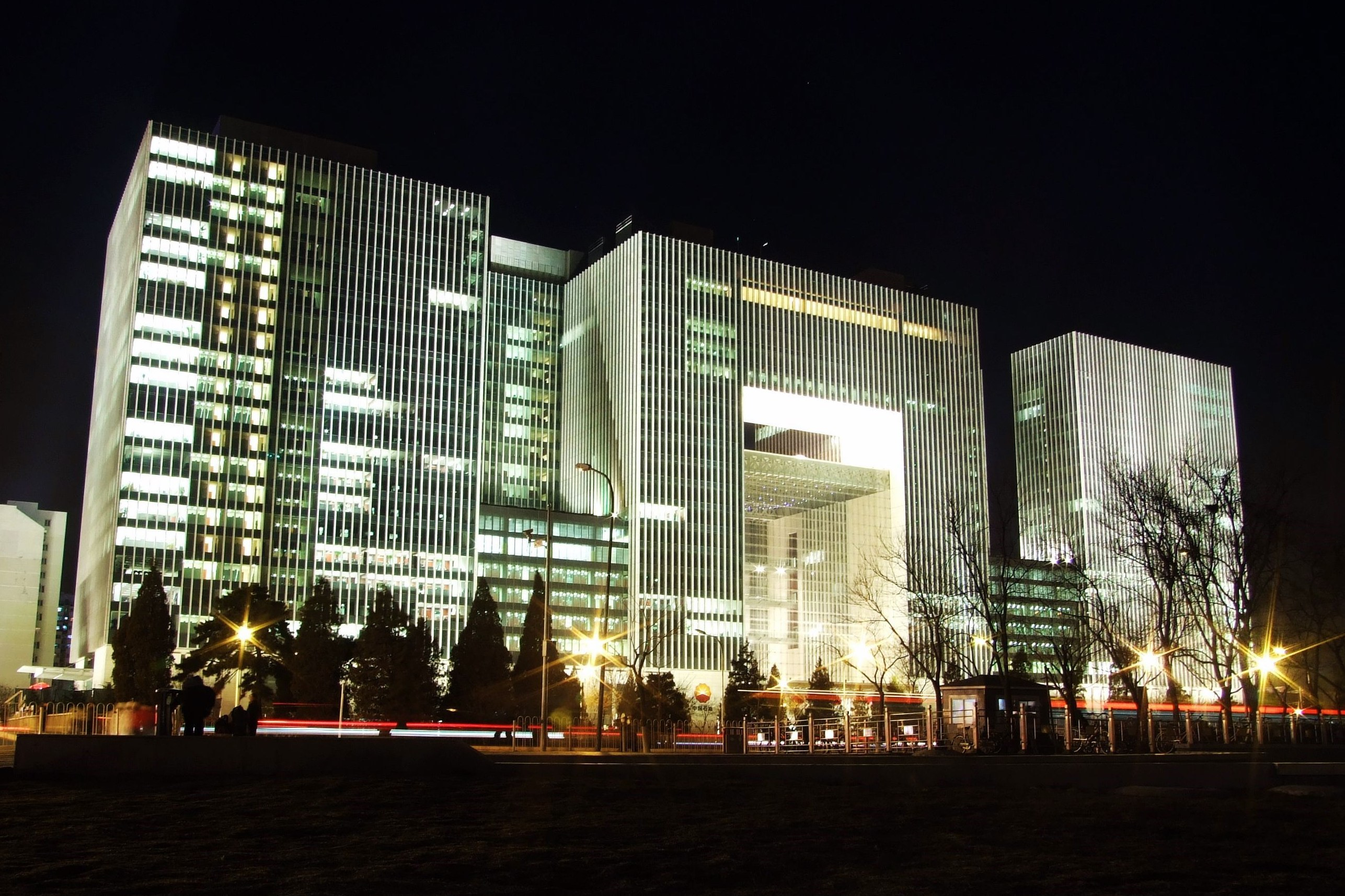
- Headquarters in Beijing, China
- Native name: 中国石油天然气股份有限公司
- Type: State-owned
- Traded as: SSE: 601857; SEHK: 857; HSI component
- ISIN: CNE1000007Q1; CNE1000003W8
- Industry: Energy
- Founded: 5 November 1999; 27 years ago
- Headquarters: Dongcheng District, Beijing, China
- Area served: Worldwide with primary markets in China
- Key people: Dai Houliang (Chairman); Hou Qijun (Vice Chairman); Huang Yongzhang (President)
- Products: Crude oil; Oil products; Natural gas; Petrochemicals
- Revenue: ▼US$402.503 billion (2024)
- Operating income: ▼US$32.051 billion (2024)
- Net income: ▲US$25.174 billion (2024)
- Total assets: ▼US$377.126 billion (2024)
- Total equity: ▲US$234.218 billion (2024)
- Number of employees: 370,799 (2024)
- Parent: China National Petroleum Corporation (82.62%)
- Subsidiaries: Singapore Petroleum Company
- Website: www.petrochina.com.cn

PetroChina
- Traditional Chinese: 中國石油天然氣股份有限公司
- Simplified Chinese: 中国石油天然气股份有限公司
Transcriptions
Standard Mandarin
- Hanyu Pinyin: Zhōngguó Shíyóu Tiānránqì Gǔfèn Yǒuxiàn Gōngsī

Abbreviated as
- Traditional Chinese: 中國石油
- Simplified Chinese: 中国石油
Transcriptions
Standard Mandarin
- Hanyu Pinyin: Zhōngguó Shíyóu

PetroChina Company Limited (Chinese: 中国石油天然气股份有限公司) is a Chinese oil and gas company and is the listed arm of state-owned China National Petroleum Corporation (CNPC), headquartered in Dongcheng District, Beijing. The company is currently Asia's largest oil and gas producer. Traded in Hong Kong and New York, the mainland enterprise announced its plans to issue stock in Shanghai in November 2007, and subsequently entered the constituent of SSE 50 Index. In the 2020 Forbes Global 2000, PetroChina was ranked as the 32nd-largest public company in the world.

== History ==
PetroChina was established as a joint stock company with limited liabilities under the Company Law of the People's Republic of China (the PRC) on 5 November 1999, as part of the restructuring of CNPC. In the restructuring, CNPC injected into PetroChina most of the assets and liabilities of CNPC relating to its exploration and production, refining and marketing, chemicals and natural gas businesses. Because of Sinopec's link to Sudan through parent company China Petrochemical Corporation, several institutional investors such as Harvard and Yale decided, in 2005, to divest from Sinopec. Sudan divestment efforts have continued to be concentrated on PetroChina since then. Fidelity Investments, after pressure from activist groups, also announced in a filing in the US that it had sold 91 per cent of its American Depositary Receipts in PetroChina in the first quarter of 2007.

At the beginning of May 2007, the company announced it had made China's largest oil find in a decade off the country's northeast coast, in an oilfield named Jidong Nanpu oil field in Bohai Bay. In May 2008 these expectations were lowered.

On 7 November 2007, Hang Seng Indexes Company announced that PetroChina would be a Hang Seng Index Constituent Stock, effective 10 December 2007. PetroChina also came under scrutiny from international organizations for its part in trading with the Sudanese government as it undertook the war in Darfur.

On 19 August 2009, PetroChina signed an A$50 billion deal with ExxonMobil to purchase liquefied natural gas from the Gorgon field in Western Australia, considered the largest contract ever signed between China and Australia, which ensures China a steady supply of LNG fuel for 20 years, and also forms as China's largest supply of relatively "clean energy". This deal has been formally secured, despite relations between Australia and China being at their lowest point in years, following the Rio Tinto espionage case and the granting of visas to Rebiya Kadeer to visit Australia.

PetroChina's Dushanzi District refinery became fully operational on 24 September 2009. The refinery is China's largest refinery with annual capacity of 10 million tons of oil and 1 million tons of ethylene. The refinery is an integral part of China's ambitions to import oil from Kazakhstan.

In February 2011, PetroChina agreed to pay $5.4 billion for a 49% stake in Canada's Duvernay shale assets owned by Encana. It was China's biggest investment in shale gas to date. PetroChina's subsidiary in Canada is named PetroChina Canada and has an office in Calgary. It operates under the direction of Li Zhiming.

China signed a deal in 2016 with the Nepal Oil Corporation to sell 30% of the total Nepalese petroleum consumption. China plans to build a pipeline to Nepal's Panchkhal along with a storage depot.

In 2017, the shares of PetroChina upped after the rise of natural gas prices for commercial use.

In February 2019, as part of the Arrow Energy joint venture with Royal Dutch Shell, the company was granted leases for $10 billion (AUS) towards the Surat project in Queensland, Australia. Liaoyang Petrochemical Corp, a unit of PetroChina, in May 2019 exported to Europe for the first time. PetroChina posted a US$4 billion profit for 2019. In 2023, PetroChina received the equivalent of US$343 million in state subsidies.

PetroChina was allowed to accelerate its renewable energy business in 2022, installing 5.36 gigawatts of wind and solar power plants and 11.2 million square meters of geothermal projects during the first half of the year. This came after the company posted a 55.3 percent year-on-year increase in interim earnings.

== PetroChina Pipelines ==
PetroChina Pipelines is a subsidiary (72.26%) of PetroChina that managed the first three pipelines of the project.

=== West–East Gas Pipeline I ===
==== History ====
The construction of the West–East Gas Pipeline started in 2002. The pipeline was put into trial operation on 1 October 2004, and the full commercial supply of natural gas commenced on 1 January 2005. The pipeline is owned and operated by PetroChina West–East Gas Pipeline Company, a subsidiary of PetroChina. Originally, it was agreed that PetroChina would have owned 50% of the pipeline, while Royal Dutch Shell, Gazprom, and ExxonMobil had been slated to hold 15% each, and Sinopec 5%. However, in August 2004, the Board of Directors of PetroChina announced that following good faith discussions with all parties to the Joint Venture Framework Agreement, the parties had not been able to reach an agreement, and the joint venture framework agreement was terminated.

==== Technical features ====
The 4,000-kilometre (2,500 mi) long pipeline runs from Lunnan in Xinjiang to Shanghai. The pipeline passes through 66 cities in the 10 provinces in China. Natural gas transported by the pipeline is used for electricity production in the Yangtze River Delta area. The capacity of the pipeline is 12 billion cubic metres (420 billion cubic feet) of natural gas annually. The cost of the pipeline was US$5.7 billion. By the end of 2007, the capacity was planned to be upgraded to 17 billion cubic metres (600 billion cubic feet). For this purpose, ten new gas compressor stations will be built and eight existing stations are to be upgraded.

==== Connections ====
The West–East Gas Pipeline is connected to the Shaan-Jing pipeline by three branch pipelines. The 886 kilometres (551 mi) long Ji-Ning branch between the Qingshan Distributing Station and the Anping Distributing Station became operational on 30 December 2005.

==== Source of supply ====
The pipeline is supplied from the Tarim Basin oil and gas fields in Xinjiang province. The Changqing gas area in Shaanxi province is a secondary gas source. In the future, the planned Kazakhstan-China gas pipeline will be connected to the West–East Gas Pipeline.

Starting from 15 September 2009, the pipeline is also supplied with coalbed methane from the Qinshui Basin in Shanxi.

=== West–East Gas Pipeline II ===
Construction of the second West–East Gas Pipeline started on 22 February 2008. The pipeline with a total length of 9,102 kilometres (5,656 mi), including 4,843 kilometres (3,009 mi) of the main line and eight sub-lines, will run from Khorgas in northwestern Xinjiang to Guangzhou in Guangdong. Up to Gansu, it will be parallel and interconnected with the first west–east pipeline. The western part of the pipeline is expected to be commissioned by 2009, and the eastern part by June 2011.

The capacity of the second pipeline is 30 billion cubic metres (1.1 trillion cubic feet) of natural gas per year. It is mainly supplied by the Central Asia-China gas pipeline. The pipeline is expected to cost US$20 billion. The project is developed by China National Oil and Gas Exploration and Development Corp. (CNODC), a joint venture of China National Petroleum Corporation and PetroChina.

=== West–East Gas Pipeline III ===
Construction of the third pipeline started in October 2012 and it is to be completed by 2015. The third pipeline will run from Horgos in western Xinjiang to Fuzhou in Fujian. It will cross Xinjiang, Gansu, Ningxia, Shaanxi, Henan, Hubei, Hunan, Jiangxi, Fujian, and Guangdong provinces.

The total length of the third pipeline is 7,378 kilometres (4,584 mi), including a 5,220-kilometre (3,240 mi) trunkline and eight branches. In addition, the project includes three gas storages and a LNG plant. It will have a capacity of 30 billion cubic metres (1.1 trillion cubic feet) of natural gas per year with operating pressure of 10–12 megapascals (1,500–1,700 psi). The pipeline will be supplied from Central Asia–China gas pipeline's Line C supplemented by supplies from the Tarim basin and coalbed methane in Xinjiang. Compressors for the pipeline are supplied by Rolls-Royce.

== Controversies ==
=== Chemical spills ===
In November 2005, one of PetroChina's chemical plants exploded in Jilin, China, resulting in 100 tons of benzene, which is a carcinogen and toxic, pouring into the Songhua River. There was a slick of chemicals that spanned 80 kilometres. Harbin, which is another city along the Songhua River, had to cut the water supply from almost 4 million people, for 5 days. More than 60 people were injured, five died, and one person was missing due to the incident. The spill reached as far as Khabarovsk, Russia, where residents stocked up on bottled water. The Russian city tried filtering its water of toxic substances, but could not guarantee the water was safe. China's environmental agency fined the company one million yuan (approximately $125,000, £64,000) for its pollution, which was the maximum fine that can be handed out in China for breaking an environmental law. The Chinese government said that cleaning up the aftermath would require one billion US dollars. Li Zhaoxing, Chinese Foreign Minister at the time, issued a public apology to Russia due to the incident. The Chinese press responded harshly to the authorities' response to the disaster.

In 2014, Petrochina's subsidiary Lanzhou Petrochemical was responsible for ethylene and ammonia leaks, benzene contamination of water supplies, and air pollution in Lanzhou. City officials criticized the company and demanded an apology.

=== The "Western Gas to the East" Pipeline Project ===
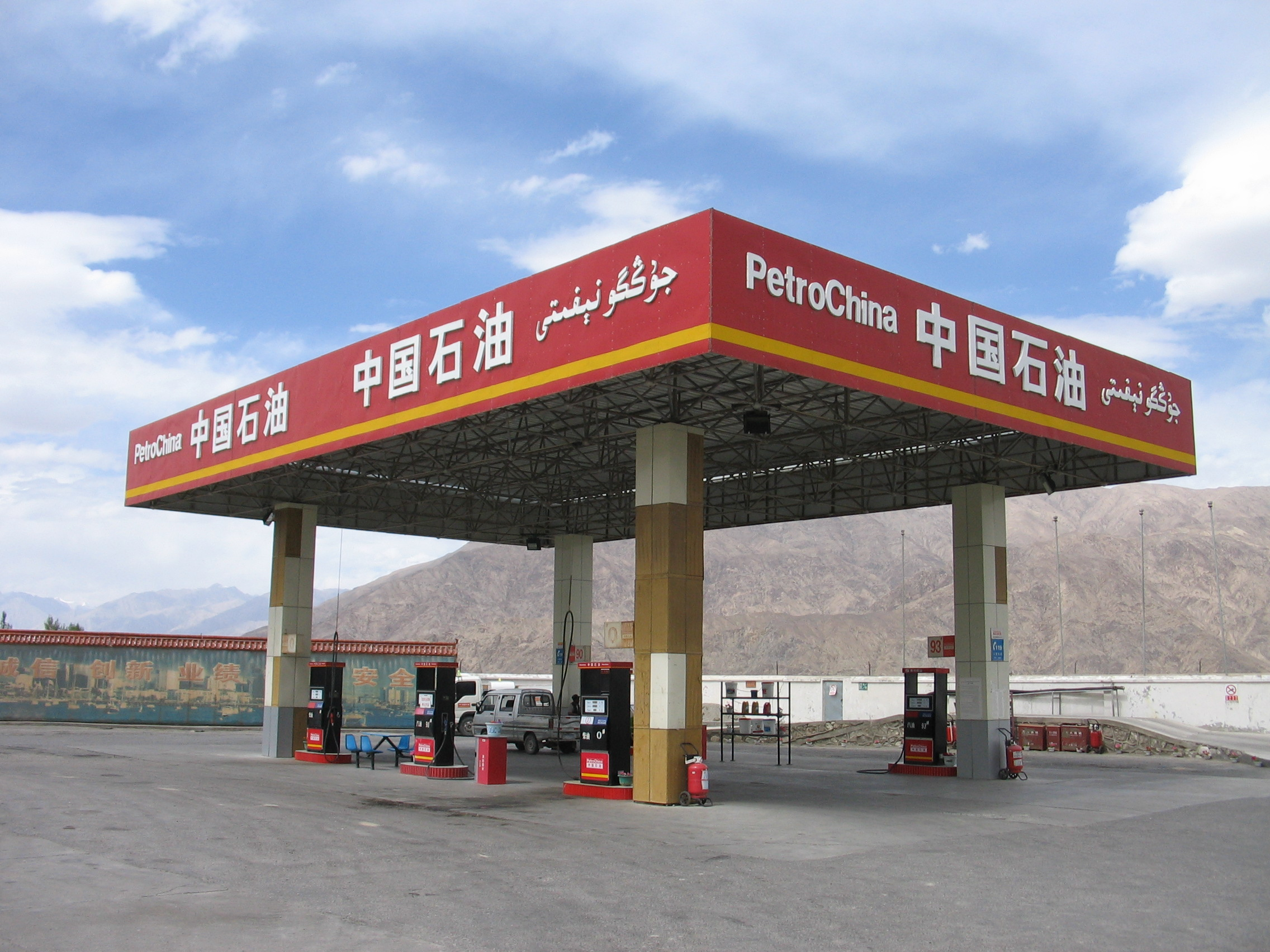
A PetroChina gas station in Xinjiang

PetroChina's development of gas reserves in Tarim Basin, Xinjiang has been the subject of controversy, as such a project could pose a threat to the environment.

=== Demonstration at Chengdu plant ===
In 2008, PetroChina began constructing a $5.5 billion petrochemical plant, expected to produce 800,000 tons of ethylene and refine 10 million tons of crude oil a year, in Chengdu, China. Although PetroChina claimed that $565 million of the total investment would be dedicated to environmental protection, residents of Chengdu believed it might bring pollution to the local area and took to the streets on 3 and 4 May 2008, to protest the petrochemical plant. The whole demonstration was peaceful, with little Chinese government intervention.

=== Trade anomalies ===
On 19 January 2022, Chinese authorities punished PetroChina's subsidiary "PetroChina Fuel Oil Co Ltd" for alleged oil trade inconsistencies that "severely disrupted oil products market order... facilitated blind development of outdated production capacity at independent refineries...caused losses in government tax revenue indirectly," said the National Development and Reform Commission.

=== Human rights ===
In 2011, Earthrights International accused PetroChina of complicity in serious human rights abuses in Burma, a country known for militarily furthering its economic interests through the use of forced labor.

=== Corruption ===
In September 2013, Jiang Jiemin, a former chairman of PetroChina, was abruptly removed from his role as director of the State-owned Assets Supervision and Administration Commission of the State Council and investigated for corruption and abuse of power, along with four other senior oil executives. Jiang was considered an ally of corrupt former security chief Zhou Yongkang, and part of a group of officials that had political ties with Zhou. On 12 October 2015, the court found Jiang guilty on all counts, including accepting bribes, possessing dark assets, and abusing his power. He was sentenced to 16 years in prison.

In January 2017, former vice chairman Liao Yongyuan was sentenced to 15 years in prison for abuse of power and accepting nearly $2 million worth of bribes.

In October 2021, the Central Commission for Discipline Inspection announced that it was investigating former vice president Ling Xiao, for "serious disciplinary violations".

=== Tax issues ===
In January 2014, the International Consortium of Investigative Journalists published research based on leaked financial records from the British Virgin Islands, implicating CNPC, PetroChina, Sinopec, and CNOOC in offshore tax evasion.

== Ranking ==
PetroChina was ranked 30th in 2018 Forbes Global 2000, a list of top listed companies of the world. In 2019, PetroChina was ranked 22nd in Forbes Global 2000. In 2023, PetroChina was ranked #18 in Forbes' Global 2000 (World's Largest Public Companies).

== Corporate bonds ==
PetroChina, on 24 October 2008 issued a series of medium-term corporate bonds worth 80 billion yuan ($11.7 billion), which was the biggest ever domestic issue by a listed company.

== Logo ==
The logo of PetroChina has represented the company in plenary capacity since 2004. The logo's basic, abecedarian design consists of a rising sun, projected onto a petal-based graphic. The colors utilized in the graphic are red and yellow, auspicious in Chinese culture. Beneath the English-language version of the design is positioned the company's name in an emboldened, black typeset, "PetroChina" (Chinese: 中国石油; pinyin: Zhōngguó shíyóu).

PetroChina's current logo was adopted 26 December 2004. The contour of the logo is defined as a "petal graphic equally divided by ten in red and yellow colors", which, according to description, "are the basic colors of the national flag of the People's Republic of China, and which embody the characteristics of the oil and gas industry". The essentially spherical design of the logo, meant to exemplify PetroChina's global development stratagem. The ten equanimous petals are indicative of PetroChina's ten consolidated core businesses. The red substratum is intended to highlight "an angle of a square shape, not only demonstrating PetroChina's strong fundamentals, but also implicating the company's huge power of cohesion and creativity". The general floral connotations of the logo are designed to capture PetroChina's "social responsibility of creating harmony between energy and environment". Finally, the sun ascending over the horizon in the center of the logo epitomizes the prosperous future hoped to lie within the future of PetroChina.

== See also ==
- China Petrochemical Corporation
- China National Offshore Oil Corporation
- Natural Gas Industry
