= Anping County =

County in Hebei, China

Anping County 安平县
- County
- Location in Hebei
- Coordinates: 38°14′N 115°31′E
- Country: People's Republic of China
- Province: Hebei
- Prefecture-level city: Hengshui
- Elevation: 29 m (95 ft)
- Time zone: UTC+8 (China Standard)
- Postal code: 053600

Anping (Chinese: 安平; pinyin: Ānpíng) is a county located in the middle of Hebei Province, it is about 100 kilometres (62 mi) away from Shijiazhuang, the provincial capital. Anping is known for its metal wire mesh in China and around the world. Over five hundred years ago, Anping people began to weave wire mesh products. There are 6700 factories and/or workshops engaged in production of metal wire mesh products and over 100,000 people in production and sales of metal wire mesh. Export quantity of metal wire mesh products from Anping accounts for over half of that of China.

Following the fast development of trading business with the world, the related industries as international trading, travel and translation agents emerged like mushrooms after rain who provide business help for coming visitors from the world, such as SinoGuider, Maersk, Cosco, Sinotrans, CMA, CN-13shipping, Evergreen-Marine for transporting and trading services, and SinoGuider company specially for language translation and business guidance services.

Anping county won many titles due to the strong trading business of iron wire mesh, such as National-level county, Base of China Wire Mesh, National Advanced County.

There is a national class commodity fair in Anping named "Anping Iron Wire Mesh World" where coming visitors can easily find hundreds of factories and agents who display their products.

== Administrative Divisions ==
Towns

- Anping (安平镇), Madian (马店镇), Nanwangzhuang (南王庄镇).

Townships

- Dahezhuang Township (大何庄乡), Chengyouzi Township (程油子乡), Xiliangwa Township (西两洼乡), Daziwen Township (大子文乡), Donghuangcheng Township (东黄城乡).

== Climate ==
Climate data for Anping, elevation 22 m (72 ft), (1991–2020 normals, extremes 1981–present)
Month	Jan	Feb	Mar	Apr	May	Jun	Jul	Aug	Sep	Oct	Nov	Dec	Year
Record high °C (°F)	16.5 (61.7)	23.3 (73.9)	30.8 (87.4)	34.2 (93.6)	40.0 (104.0)	41.6 (106.9)	41.8 (107.2)	37.6 (99.7)	35.7 (96.3)	31.5 (88.7)	25.2 (77.4)	19.2 (66.6)	41.8 (107.2)
Mean daily maximum °C (°F)	3.0 (37.4)	7.3 (45.1)	14.4 (57.9)	21.8 (71.2)	27.5 (81.5)	32.0 (89.6)	32.4 (90.3)	30.5 (86.9)	26.8 (80.2)	20.5 (68.9)	11.2 (52.2)	4.3 (39.7)	19.3 (66.7)
Daily mean °C (°F)	−2.9 (26.8)	1.0 (33.8)	7.9 (46.2)	15.2 (59.4)	21.2 (70.2)	25.8 (78.4)	27.4 (81.3)	25.7 (78.3)	20.9 (69.6)	14.0 (57.2)	5.4 (41.7)	−1.0 (30.2)	13.4 (56.1)
Mean daily minimum °C (°F)	−7.3 (18.9)	−3.9 (25.0)	2.2 (36.0)	9.3 (48.7)	15.1 (59.2)	20.2 (68.4)	23.0 (73.4)	21.7 (71.1)	16.1 (61.0)	8.9 (48.0)	0.9 (33.6)	−5.0 (23.0)	8.4 (47.2)
Record low °C (°F)	−18.6 (−1.5)	−16.6 (2.1)	−9.5 (14.9)	−2.2 (28.0)	5.0 (41.0)	9.9 (49.8)	16.2 (61.2)	12.3 (54.1)	5.2 (41.4)	−3.2 (26.2)	−15.6 (3.9)	−20.4 (−4.7)	−20.4 (−4.7)
Average precipitation mm (inches)	1.7 (0.07)	5.1 (0.20)	8.0 (0.31)	26.8 (1.06)	40.3 (1.59)	55.2 (2.17)	133.4 (5.25)	112.8 (4.44)	45.8 (1.80)	25.0 (0.98)	13.7 (0.54)	3.1 (0.12)	470.9 (18.53)
Average precipitation days (≥ 0.1 mm)	1.6	2.4	2.7	5.0	6.6	8.4	11.2	10.0	6.3	5.0	3.7	2.0	64.9
Average snowy days	2.7	2.6	1.0	0.2	0	0	0	0	0	0	1.3	2.5	10.3
Average relative humidity (%)	57	52	49	53	57	59	74	79	72	66	65	61	62
Mean monthly sunshine hours	151.4	164.3	215.9	236.5	269.8	248.2	199.3	197.8	203.7	190.3	153.3	148.1	2,378.6
Percentage possible sunshine	50	53	58	59	61	56	45	47	55	56	51	50	53
Source: China Meteorological AdministrationAll-time June low
