= List of oil pipelines =

Oil industry map showing oil pipelines, refineries, and petroleum fields.

This is a list of oil pipelines

== Africa ==
- Algeria – Spain Pipeline Gazoduc Pedro Duran Farel 48 inch
- Algeria – Italy Gazoduc Enrico matini
- Chad – Cameroon Petroleum Development and Chad–Cameroon pipeline
- South Sudan – Ethiopia Sudeth pipeline (under construction)
- South Africa – Transnet Pipelines
- Somaliland – Genel Energy / CPC Taiwan Pipeline towards Berbera 157 km (planned)
- Uganda, Tanzania – TotalEnergies East African Crude Oil Pipeline (Commencing 2026) 1,444 km.
- Egypt – Sumed pipeline
- Tanzania – Zambia Tazama Pipeline
- Nigeria – Nembe Creek Trunk Line
- Mozambique – CPMZ-Mozambique-Zimbabwe Pipeline Company
- Sudan – Khartoum-Madani Petroleum Products Pipeline (KMPP)
- Kenya – Kenya pipeline

== Asia ==
- Afghanistan Oil Pipeline (planned)
- Alashankou–Dushanzi Crude Oil Pipeline
- Baku–Tbilisi–Ceyhan pipeline
- Baku–Supsa Pipeline
- Baku–Novorossiysk pipeline
- Bangladesh–India Friendship Pipeline
- Caspian Pipeline Consortium
- Dornod–Sainshand Oil Pipeline (under construction)
- East–West Crude Oil Pipeline
- Eastern Siberia–Pacific Ocean oil pipeline
- Gwadar–Kashgar Crude Oil Pipeline
- Habshan–Fujairah oil pipeline
- Kabrai–Dhanbad cutter pipeline
- Kandla–Gorakhpur LPG pipeline (planned)
- Kazakhstan–China oil pipeline
- Kirkuk–Banias pipeline
- Kirkuk–Ceyhan Oil Pipeline
- Koyali–Mohanpura product pipeline
- Mumbai–Manmad Pipeline
- Mundra–Delhi pipeline
- Mundra–Panipat crude oil pipeline
- Motihari-Amlekhgunj Oil Pipeline
- Paradip-Haldia-Barauni crude oil pipeline
- PS Pipeline
- Samsun–Ceyhan Pipeline
- Sino-Burma pipelines
- South–North Pipeline Korea
- Trans-Arabian Pipeline, a.k.a. Tapline (defunct)
- Trans-Israel pipeline
- Trans-Korea Pipeline
- Rojkov-Goto Pipeline
- Trans-Caspian Oil Pipeline – planned
- Salaya–Mathura crude oil pipeline
- White Oil Pipeline in Pakistan

== Europe ==
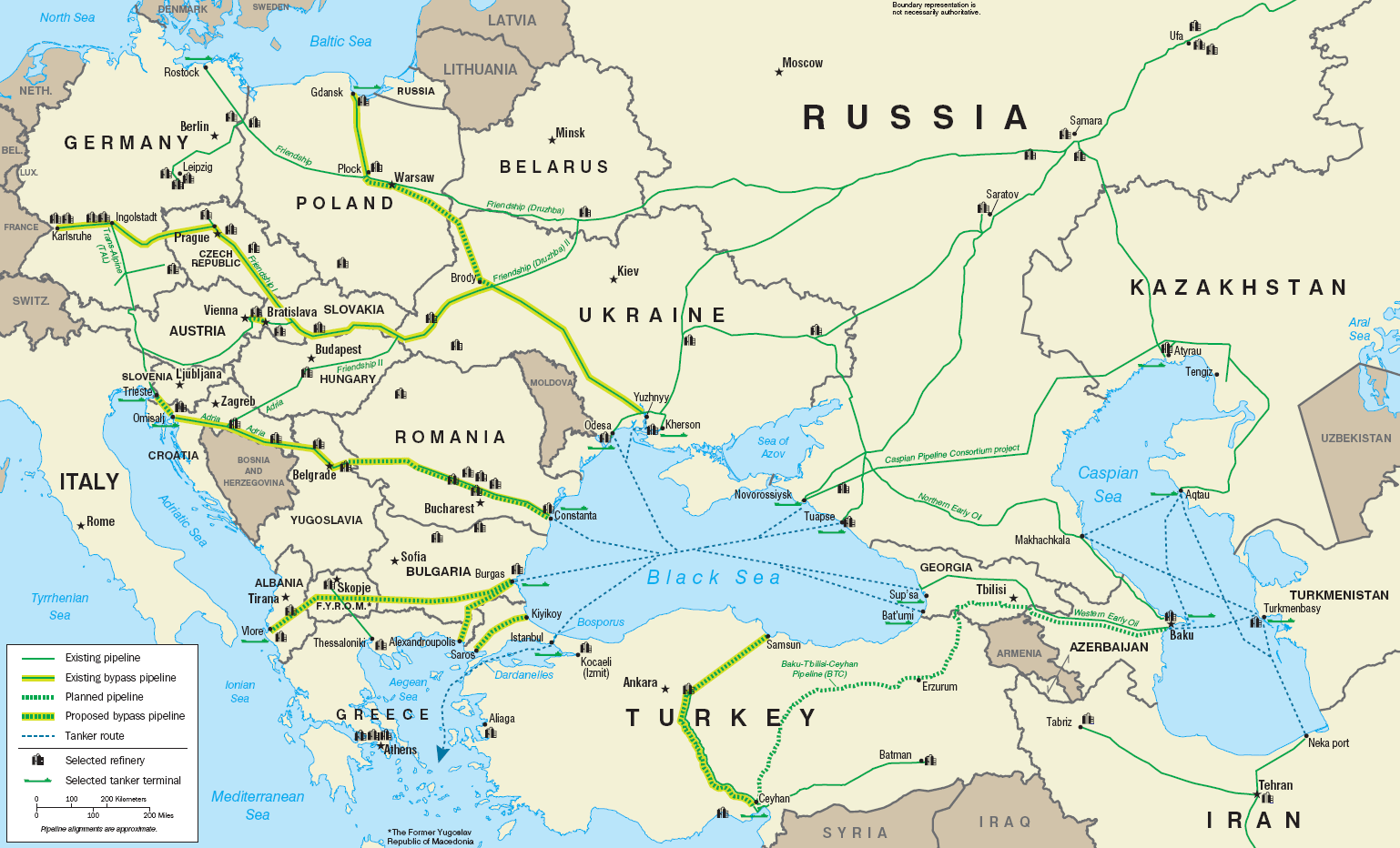
A non-exhaustive map of oil pipelines in Europe (2007)

- Hungary – Serbia Region Adria oil pipeline
- Bulgaria – Albania Region AMBO pipeline
- Russia – Baltic Pipeline System
- United Kingdom – Brent System
- Burgas-Alexandroupoli pipeline
- CLH
- Druzhba pipeline
- United Kingdom – Forties pipeline system
- Russia – Grozny-Tuapse pipeline
- Ninian pipeline
- Ukraine – Poland Odesa–Brody pipeline
- Europe – Pan-European Pipeline
- Germany-Czech Republic-Austria-Transalpine Pipeline
- France-Switzerland-Germany-South European Pipeline
- France – TRAPIL

== Americas ==
=== Northern America ===
==== Canada ====
Canada
Name	Status	Capacity (bpd)	Receipt point(s)	Crossing	Delivery point(s)	Owner(s)	Length (km)	Regulator	Notes
Aurora	operating	45,000	Rangeland Pipeline	Carway	Glacier Pipeline	Plains Midstream	0.75	AER	
Cochin	operating		Explorer, TEPPCO, Wabash pipelines at Kankakee, IL	Elmore, SK	Fort Saskatchewan, AB				Moves condensate westward from 2014; from 1979 it moved product eastward.
Enbridge Bakken	operating	145,000	Steelman, SK, & Berthold, ND	Portal	Enbridge Mainline at Cromer	Enbridge Bakken Pipeline Co	132		
Enbridge Pipeline System	operating		Kerrobert & Regina, SK; Cromer, MB; Clearbrook, MB	Gretna, MB		Enbridge			
Enbridge Norman Wells	suspended		Norman Well, NWT		Zama, AB	Enbridge Pipelines (NW) Inc.	869 c		Shut down after 2016
Express Pipeline	operating	280,000	Hardisty, AB	Wild Horse, AB	Casper, WY	Express Pipeline Ltd	439 c		
Keystone Pipeline 1,2,3	operating	300,000	Alberta (Hardisty)	Haskett, AB	Steele City, NB & Cushing, OK	TransCanada			Crosses South Dakota to Steele City, where it branches east through Kansas and Missouri to delivery points at Wood River and Patoka, Illinois, and south to delivery points at Cushing, Oklahoma and Houston and Port Arthur, Texas. Along the way at Patoka, Keystone delivers crude oil to the Plains terminal which facilitates delivery to local refineries via third party pipelines.
Keystone XL Pipeline	cancelled					TransCanada			Project cancelled in June 2021 as a result of US President Biden revoking permits for the project on January 20, 2021, due to opposition from Native American tribes, climate activists, and the Democratic Party, as the Keystone XL pipeline will worsen pollution and climate change.
Milk River Pipeline	operating	97,900	Bow River Pipeline, Milk River, AB	Sweetgrass, MT	Front Range Pipeline, Coutts, AB	Plains Midstream	69 c	AER	
Portland-Montreal Pipe Line	part operation	223,000	South Portland, ME		Montreal, QC	Montreal Pipe Line Ltd	236 c		This is the NEB-regulated segment of the Portland-Montreal pipeline system. Moves crude from Atlantic to Suncor refinery at Montreal. Two of 3 pipelines decommissioned (12 & 18 inch). Only 24-inch in operation
Southern Lights	operating	180,000	Manhattan, IL		Edmonton, AB	Enbridge Southern Lights GP Inc.	1529 c		Moves diluent north; formed in 2010 by reversing 1465 km of former Enbridge Line 13 and constructing 1091 km of new pipeline in the U.S. It shares the Enbridge Mainline right-of-way.
Trans Mountain Pipeline System	operating		Edmonton, AB, & Kamloops, BC.		Burnaby & Burrard Inlet, BC, & Sumas, WA	Government of Canada			Moves crude oil & petroleum products to Parkland Burnaby refinery & Suncor Burrard products terminal; moves crude oil to four refineries in Washington via connection at Sumas to Puget Sound Pipeline; moves crude oil to Asia and U.S. West coast via Westridge Marine Terminal in Burnaby. One of few to ship crude & products in one pipe.
Trans-Northern	operating	132,000	Montreal & Nanticoke		Toronto, Oakville, Ottawa, Maitland, Belleville, Cornwall, Kingston, Montreal, Dorval				RPPs delivery at points including Oakville, Toronto, Ottawa, Maitland, Belleville, Cornwall, Kingston, Montreal, Dorval; operates bi-directionally between Toronto & Oakville. Three other petroleum products pipelines (two Sun-Canadian and Enbridge's Line 8) transport gasoline, diesel, heating oil and jet fuel to Toronto and other cities along the route.
Utopia / Cochin Eastern	operating	50,000	Harrison County, OH		Windsor, ON				Formerly the eastern part of Cochin. Moves ethane from new pipeline from a point in Harrison County to a connection with existing Kinder Morgan pipeline and facilities near Riga, Michigan.
Wascana	operating	40,000	Raymond Station, MT		Plains Terminal, Regina	Plains Midstream	173 c		Moves light crude from Bakken north to connect to Enbridge Mainline at Regina; prior to 2012 it was southbound
Westspur	operating	247,400	Alida, Steelman, Bryant, Midale, SK		Enbridge Mainline near Cromer, MB	TEML	511 c	Saskatchewan	Tundra Energy Marketing; Moves crude oil & condensate to Mainline; until Dec. 2106 owned by Enbridge

==== United States ====
Name	Status	Capacity	Starting point	Crossing	Ending point	Owners	Length (mi)	Regulator	Notes
ATEX Pipeline	operating		Washington County, PA			Enterprise Production Partners	1,230		
Big Inch	operating					Spectra Energy Partners Enterprise Production Partners			
Buckeye Partners									
Calnev Pipeline	operating	128,000	Los Angeles, CA		Las Vegas, NV	Kinder Morgan Energy Partners	550		
Chaparral NGL Pipeline						Enterprise Production Partners			
Colonial Pipeline	operating	3 million				Colonial Pipeline Company	5,500		
Dakota Access Pipeline	operating	750,000					1,172		
Dixie Pipeline						Enterprise Production Partners	1,307		
Double H Pipeline						Kinder Morgan Energy Partners			
Dow Pipeline Company									
Enbridge Pipeline System						Enbridge			
Jayhawk and Kaw Pipelines									
Keystone Pipeline						TC Energy Government of Alberta			XL phase halted in January 2021, XL phase terminated in June 2021
Lakehead Pipeline						Enbridge			
Line 3 pipeline	operating					Enbridge			
Longhorn Pipeline						Longhorn Partners			
Magellan Midstream Partners									
Mahadeva Pipeline									
Mariner East Pipelines									
Mid-America Pipeline System									
Minnesota Pipeline						Minnesota Pipe Line Company, LLC Koch Pipeline Company (operator)			
North Dakota Pipeline							950		
Olympic Pipeline									
Plantation Pipeline							3,100		
Pilgrim Pipeline	cancelled								
Pony Express Pipeline						Tallgrass Energy Partners	760		
Seaway Pipeline		180,000					760		
Seminole Pipeline						Enterprise Production Partners			
Trans-Alaska Pipeline System	operating	2,136,000	Prudhoe Bay, Alaska		Valdez, Alaska	Alyeska Pipeline Service Company	800.3		
Trans Mountain Pipeline									
Unev Pipeline							399		
Yellowstone Pipeline									

===== Not yet operational =====
- Sand Hills Pipeline: This pipeline is being developed by DCP Midstream. It will extend for 700 miles from West to East Texas and have an initial capacity of approximately 120,000 barrels per day. The first segment of the pipeline opened in October 2012.
- Pecos River Pipeline: Developed by Bridger Group and Advantage Pipeline, the Pecos River Pipeline will provide a link from the Delaware Basin to the Gulf Coast. The pipeline will run from the Pecos, Texas, to Crane, Texas, where it will connect to the Longhorn Pipeline. The Pecos River Pipeline will have an initial capacity of 150,000 barrels per day.
- Sterling III Pipeline: Under development from Oneok Partners, the Sterling III Pipeline will extend from parts of Texas and Oklahoma in the Mid-Continent Region to the Gulf Coast, and have a capacity of approximately 193,000 barrels per day.

=== Latin America ===
- Activo de Burgos pipeline network – Mexico
- Burgos–Monterrey pipeline – Mexico
- Cadereyta pipeline – Mexico
- Ecopetrol pipelines – Colombia
- OCP pipeline – Ecuador
- Oil tanking pipeline – Argentina
- PDVSA pipelines – Venezuela
- PEMEX pipelines – Mexico
- Petroandina pipeline – Argentina (under construction)
- Recope pipelines – Costa Rica
- San Fernando pipeline – Mexico
- SOTE pipeline – Ecuador
- Tamazunchale pipeline – Mexico
- TGN pipeline network – Argentina
- TGI pipeline network – Colombia
- TGS pipeline network – Argentina
- Trans-Isthmian pipeline – Panama
- Transpetro pipelines – Brazil
- North Peruvian Pipeline (Oleoducto Norperuano) – Petroperú, Peru

== See also ==
- List of natural gas pipelines
- List of oil refineries
- Pipeline transport
