= Trailblazer Pipeline =

Trailblazer Pipeline is a natural gas pipeline that brings natural gas from Colorado into Nebraska, where the pipeline joins the NGPL. It is owned by Tallgrass Energy Partners, LP is a private master limited partnership (MLP) headquartered in Overland Park, KS. On August 17, 2012, Tallgrass entered into a purchase and sale agreement with Kinder Morgan Energy Partners, L.P. (NYSE: KMP) to buy Kinder Morgan Interstate Gas Transmission, Trailblazer Pipeline Company, the Casper-Douglas natural gas processing and West Frenchie Draw treating facilities in Wyoming, and KMP's 50 percent interest in the Rockies Express Pipeline. Tallgrass closed this acquisition on November 13, 2012. Its FERC code is 68.

== See also ==
- List of North American natural gas pipelines
