= Transport in South Korea =

Transportation in South Korea is provided by extensive networks of railways, highways, bus routes, ferry services and air routes that traverse the country. South Korea is the third country in the world to operate a maglev train, which was an automatically run people mover at Incheon International Airport.

== History ==
Development of modern infrastructure began with the first Five-Year Development Plan (1962–66), which included the construction of 275 kilometers of railways and several small highway projects. Construction of the Gyeongbu Expressway, which connects the two major cities of Seoul and Busan, was completed on 7 July 1970.

In 1970, around half of the population of Seoul, one of South Korea's most industrial cities, had moved to it only in the prior decade. With the rapid increase of people traveling across the country, a means of transporting large groups of people was needed. Public transportation, such as trams and railways, was installed for these people to move quickly. These people naturally settled in close proximity to jobs or near easy-to-move stations. The concentration of population in large cities continued and more transportation was needed to move these people.

The 1970s saw increased commitment to infrastructure investments. The third Five-Year Development Plan (1972–76) added the development of airports and seaports. The Subway system was built in Seoul, the highway network was expanded by 487 km and major port projects were started in Pohang, Ulsan, Masan, Incheon and Busan.

The development of industry and automobile technology in the 1960s led to a growing number of people having private cars, mainly in advanced countries such as Europe. The number of cars has more than doubled in Europe in a decade. People can go anywhere, anytime by car. Even now, the demand for cars continues to grow. Increased demand for cars has also helped ease the population's downtown concentration. This is because you can buy a cheap house in a relatively remote area that was difficult to access by public transportation and travel by car. At first, residential areas were formed in the center of the city, and the size of the city grew as the concentric circle grew from the center. Of course, new roads had to be built and intersections, circular roads and highways had to be built to accommodate the growing number of cars. In other words, transportation systems such as private cars and road expansion have been developed to speed up travel time. The problem of environmental pollution is also a reason why public transportation has developed. The car's fuel is consumed and pollutants such as nitrogen oxides, carbon monoxide, hydrocarbons and dust due to incomplete combustion are also released. By the 1990s, cars also emitted sulfur dioxide.

The railroad network experienced improvements in the 1980s with electrification and additional track projects. Operation speed was also increased on the main lines. Though the railroad was still more useful for transportation of freight, passenger traffic was also growing. There was 51,000 kilometers of roadways by 1988. Expressway network was expanded to connect more major cities and reached a combined length of 1,539 kilometers before the end of the decade.

== Rail ==
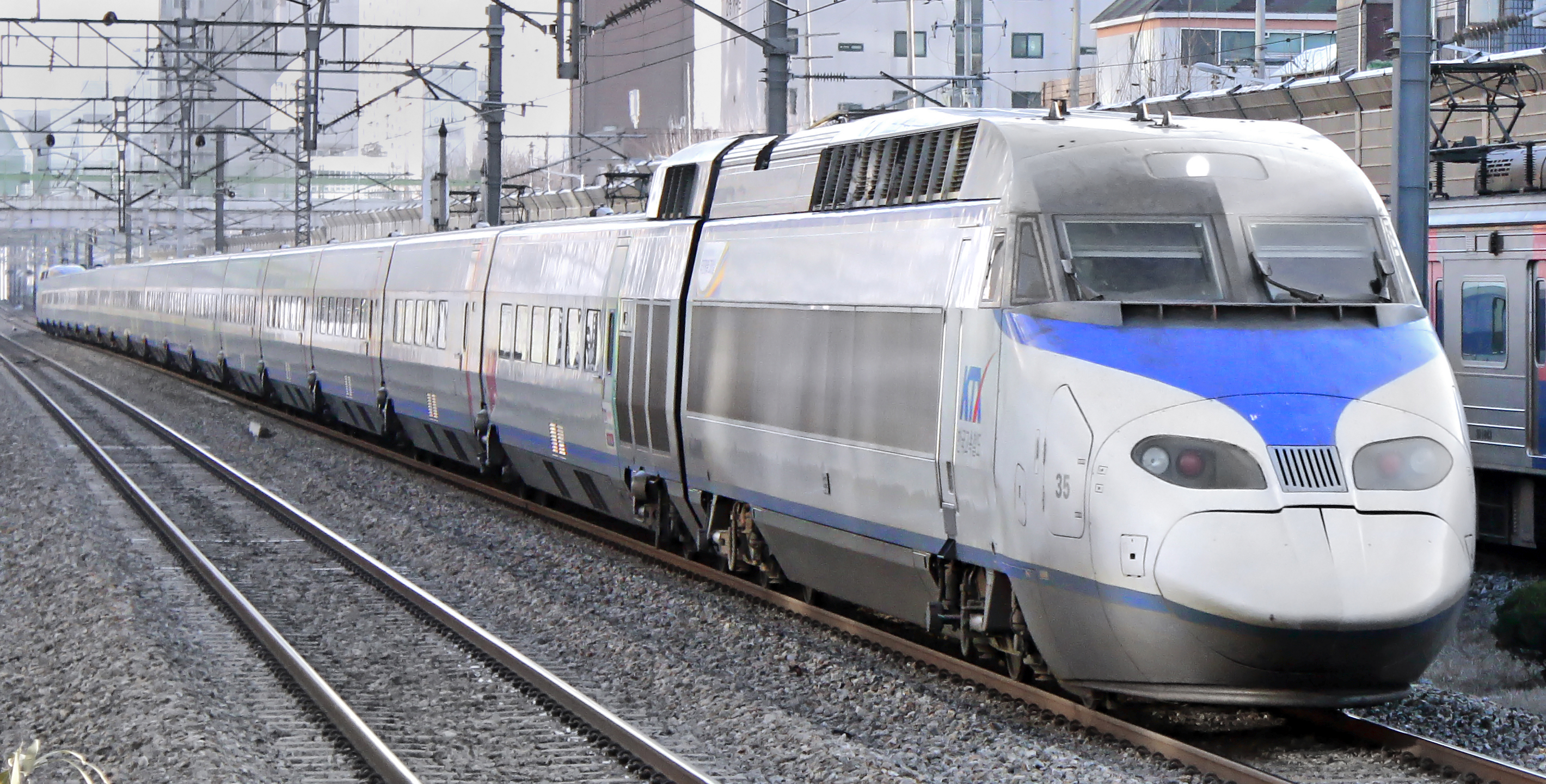
KTX train

The largest railway operator is Korail. Railway network is managed by Korea Rail Network Authority.

Korea Train Express began service in April 2004 as Korea's first high-speed service. Intercity services are provided by ITX-Saemaeul and Mugunghwa-ho. ITX-Saemaeul generally stops less than Mugunghwa-ho. They stop in all stations and seat reservation is not available. On routes where KTX operates, air travel significantly declined with fewer passengers choosing to fly and airlines offering fewer flights.

Nuriro Train service runs between Seoul-Sinchang route and other lines. Nuriro Train serves commuters around Seoul Metropolitan Area, providing shorter travel time than Seoul Subway. The rapid trains have same cost and seat reservation as Mugunghwa-ho. Korail plans to expand the service area. (Stopped its service)

=== Subways ===
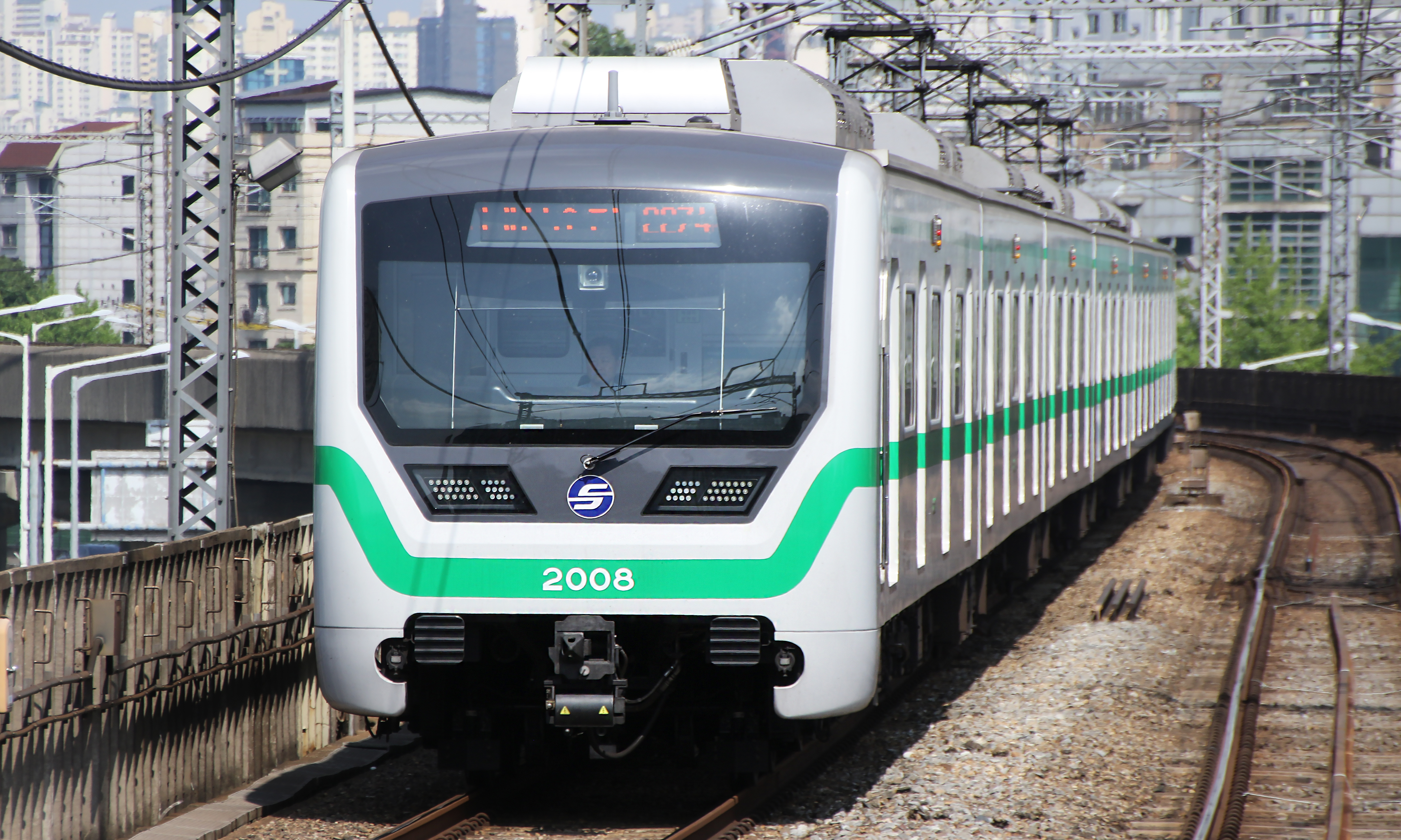
Subway line 2 in Seoul, Korea

a subway map of the metropolitan area

South Korea's six largest cities — Seoul, Busan, Daegu, Gwangju, Daejeon and Incheon — all have subway systems.

Seoul's subway system is the oldest system in the country, with the Seoul Station – Cheongnyangni section of Line 1 opening in 1974.

== Trams ==
The first tram line in Seoul started operation between Seodaemun and Cheongnyangni in December 1898. The network was expanded to cover the whole downtown area (Jung-gu and Jongno-gu districts) as well as surrounding neighbourhoods, including Cheongnyangni in the east, Mapo-gu in the west, and Noryangjin across the Han River to the south.

The networks reached its peak in 1941, but was abandoned in favor of cars and the development of a subway system in 1968. Seoul Subway Line 1 and Line 2 follow the old streetcar routes along Jongno and Euljiro, respectively.

A new tram line, Wirye Line is scheduled to open in Seoul in 26 December 2026, and openings are planned in Daejeon and Ulsan.

== Buses ==
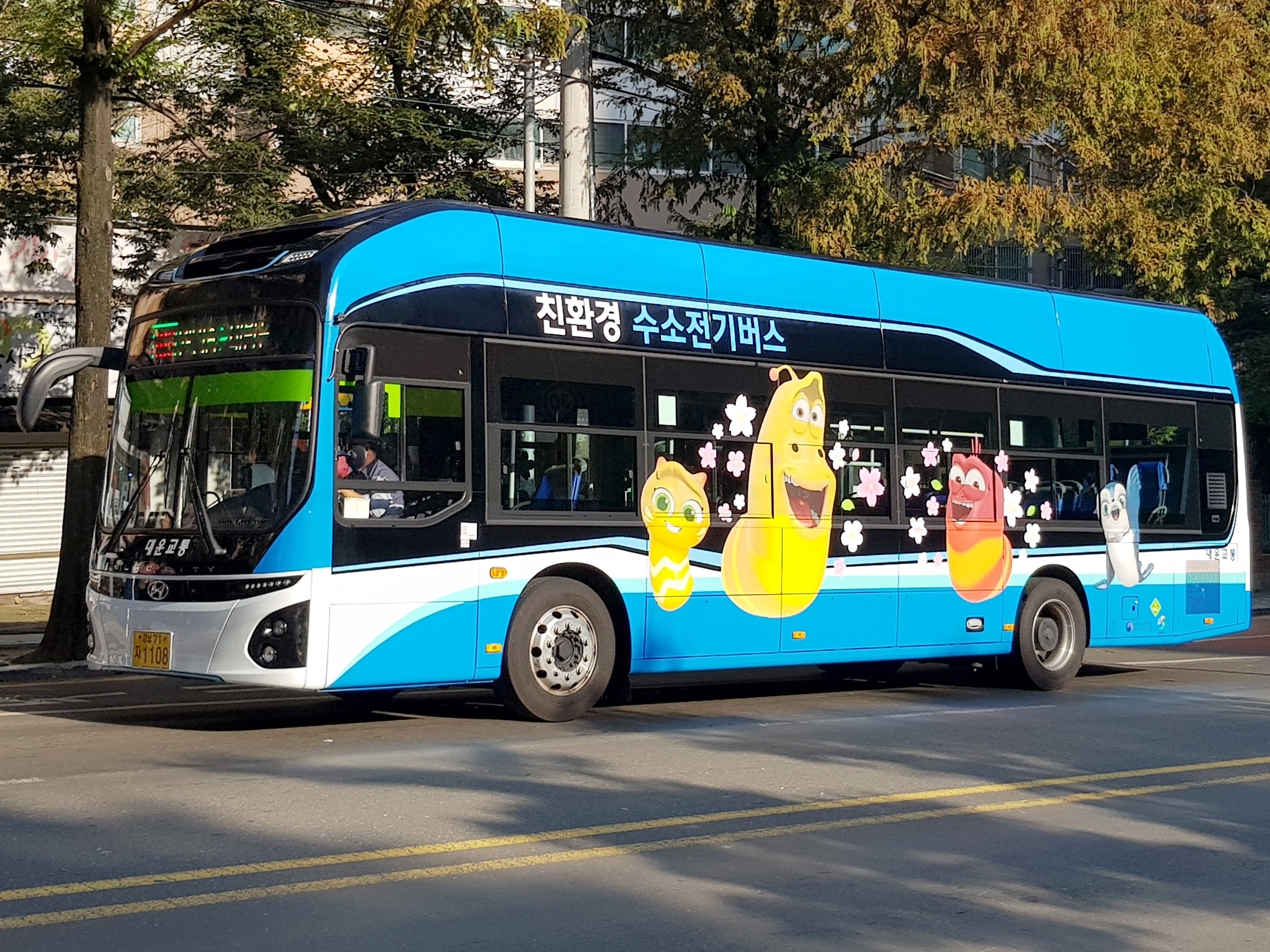
Hydrogen city bus in Changwon

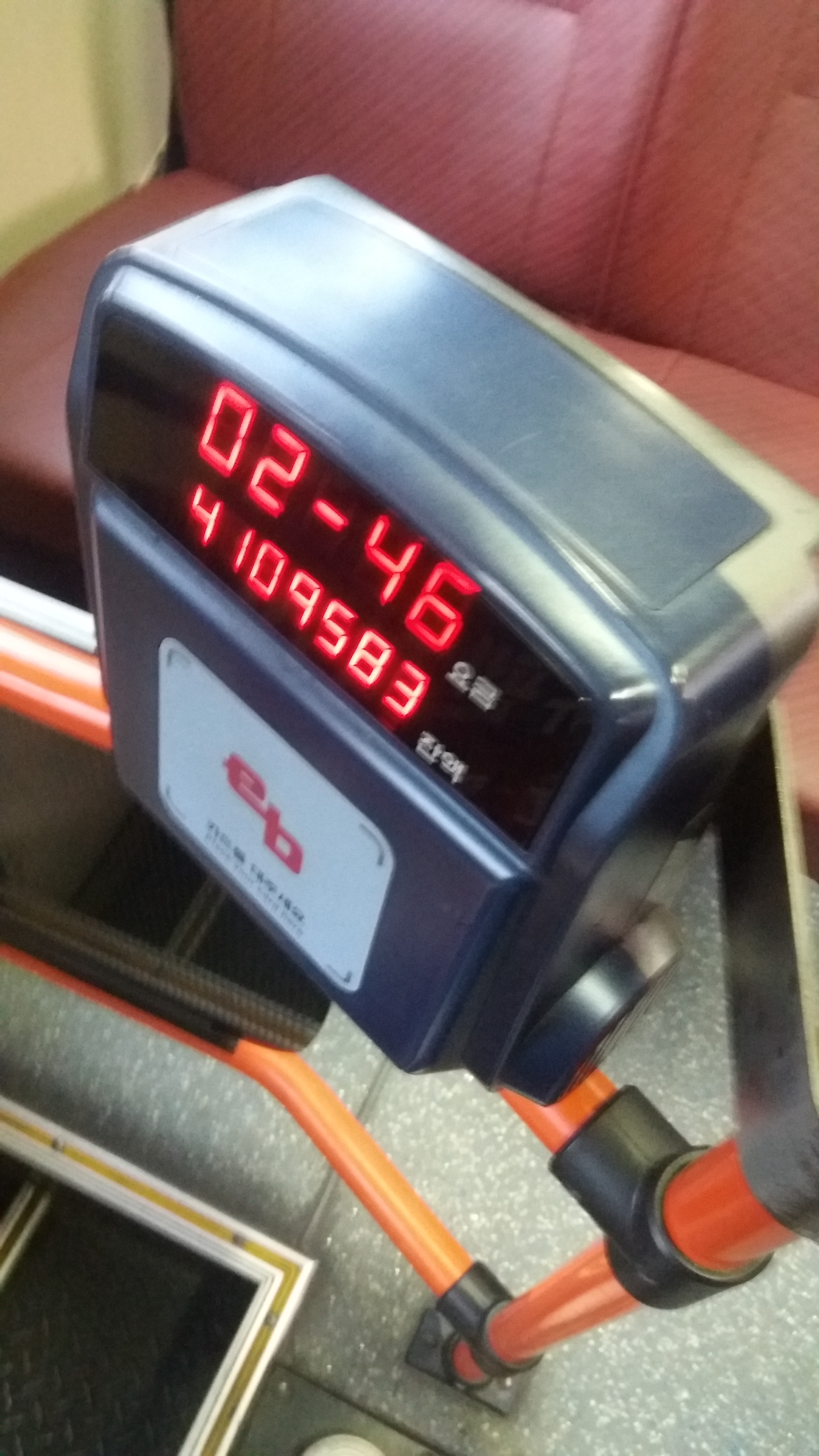
Card terminal in bus

=== Regional services ===
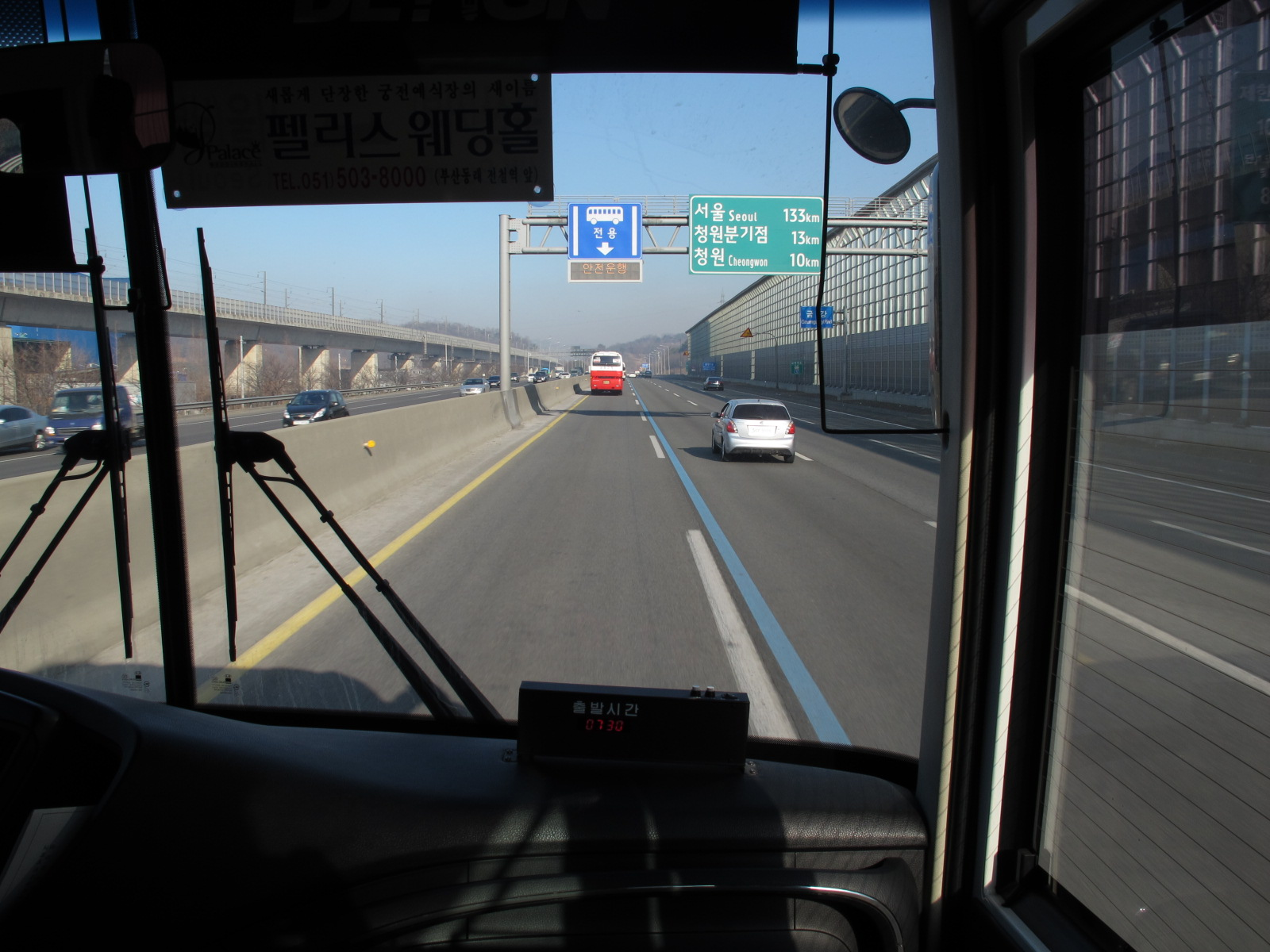
Highway bus lane on Gyeongbu Expressway in South Korea.

Virtually all towns in South Korea of all sizes are served by regional bus service. Regional routes are classified as gosok bus (고속버스, "high speed" express bus) or sioe bus (시외버스, "suburban" intercity bus) with gosok buses operating over the longer distances and making the fewest (if any) stops en route. Shioe buses typically operate over shorter distances, are somewhat slower, and make more stops. It is possible to reach another city by intercity buses. From Seoul, the place is Express Bus Terminal, the subway station is served by Seoul Subway Lines 3, 7 and 9.

=== Local services ===
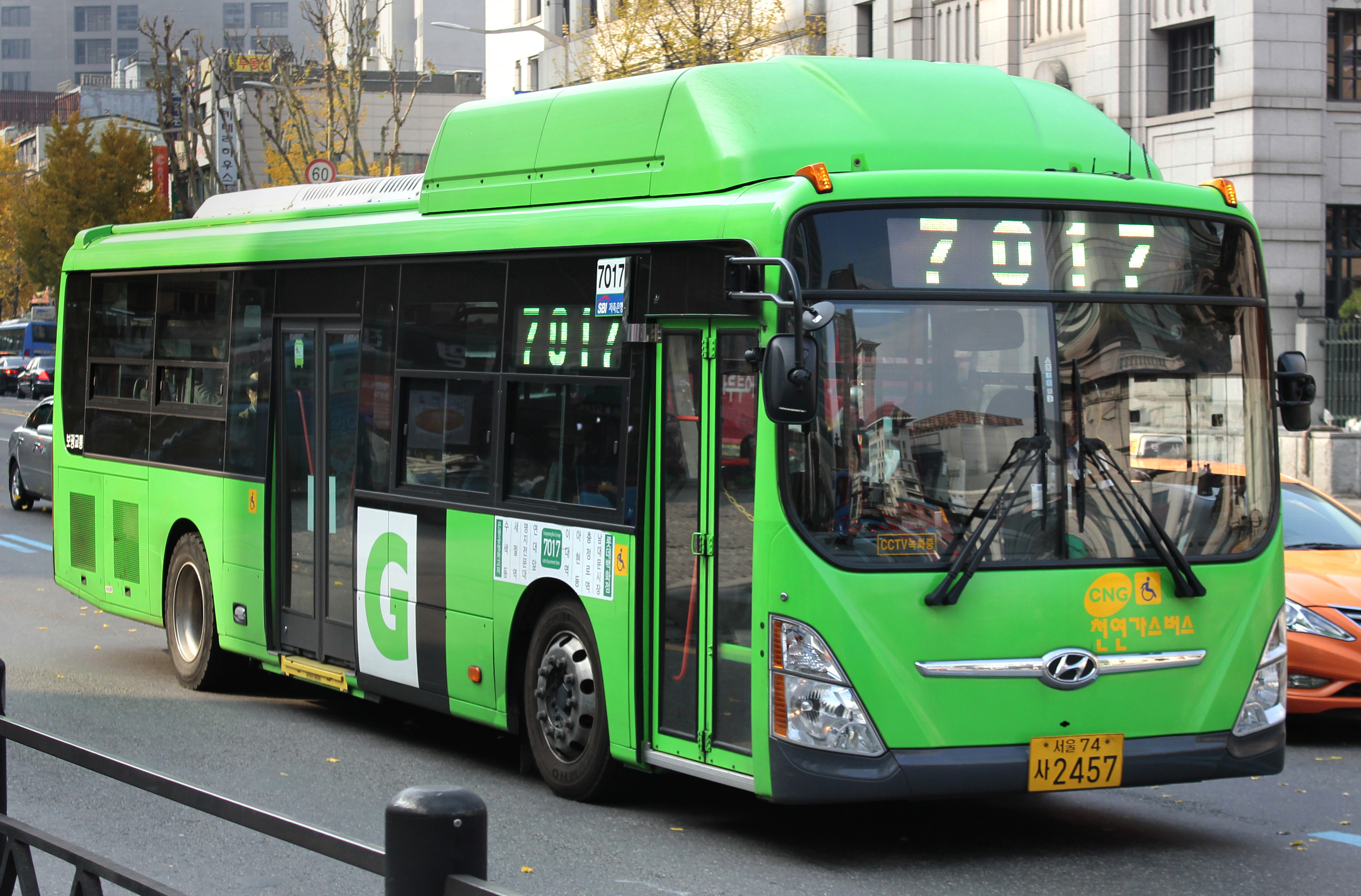
Local bus in Seoul

Within cities and towns, two types of city bus operate in general: jwaseok (좌석, "coach") and dosihyeong (도시형, "city type") or ipseok (입석, "standing"). Both types of bus often serve the same routes, make the same (or fewer) stops and operate on similar frequencies, but jwaseok buses are more expensive and offer comfortable seating, while doshihyeong buses are cheaper and have fewer and less comfortable seats. Many small cities and towns do not have jwaseok buses and their buses are officially called nongeochon (농어촌, "rural area" bus). The local buses in Seoul and other cities are categorized by colours: the blue buses are trunk lines that cross the entire city, the green ones are circulator/short run lines that connect passengers with subway or railway stations, and the red buses are express lines go out of the city to nearby suburbs.

Some cities have their own bus classifying systems.

Bus type	Seoul	Busan	Daegu	Daejeon
Jwaseok (좌석)	Rapid: Gwangyeok (광역), red Trunk: Ganseon (간선), blue	Rapid: Geuphaeng (급행); Coach: Jwaseok (좌석)	Rapid: Geuphaeng (급행); Trunk Coach: Ganseon jwaseok (간선좌석)	Rapid: Geuphaeng (급행), red Trunk: Ganseon (간선), blue
Doshihyeong (도시형 also known as city style)/Ipseok (입석)	Trunk: Ganseon (간선), blue Branch: Jiseon (지선), green	Regular: Ilban (일반)	Circulation: Sunhwan (순환); Trunk: Ganseon (간선); Branch: Jiseon (간선)	Trunk: Ganseon (간선), blue Branch: Jiseon, green
Village	Branch: Jiseon (지선), green Circulation: Sunhwan (순환), yellow	Village: Maeul-bus (마을버스 also known as village bus)	N/A	Branch: Jiseon (지선), green Outer: Oegwak (외곽), green Village: Maeul-bus (마을버스)

=== Other services ===
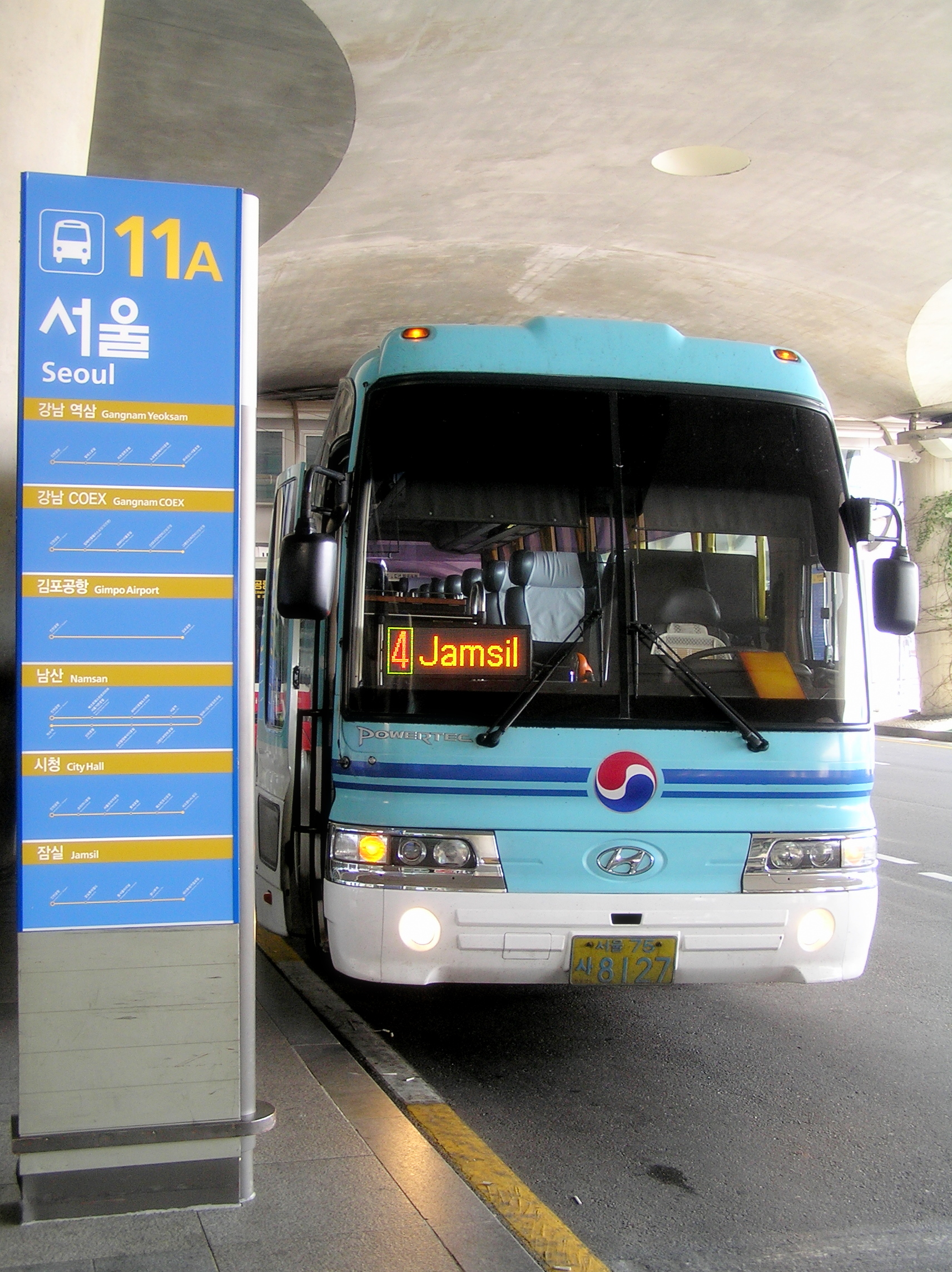
A limousine bus departing from Incheon International Airport bus station

Incheon International Airport is served by an extensive network of high-speed buses from all parts of the country.

Beginning in the late 1990s, many department stores operated their own small networks of free buses for shoppers, but government regulation, confirmed by a court decision on June 28, 2001, have banned department stores from operating buses. However, most churches, daycare centres and private schools send buses around to pick up their congregants, patients or pupils.

=== Fares ===
Bus fares vary depending on the type of bus, the method of payment, and the age of the passenger. Passengers pay the right fare by placing their transportation card, which they can fill with money prior, on a card terminal. Among the various types (mainly classified according to distance traveled), there is a separate application for bus booking. The app has a simple payment function and passengers can quickly make a reservation, choosing a boarding date and seat. There are machines at bus stops that allow passengers to check their remaining balance on their transportation cards. In addition, the arrival time and remaining seats of the buses at the bus stop in question are displayed on the electronic display board. Passengers can determine the arrival time of a bus on various transportation applications.

=== Inclusion of Taxis ===
In South Korea, public transportation methods and facilities, like buses and railroad stations, receive financial support from the government. Not included in the list are taxis. Some South Koreans argue that taxi drivers should be included in public transportation even if they do not have regular connections due to the nature of taxis. On the other hand, other South Koreans disagree and express their opinions that what is considered the current means of public transportation should be maintained.

Some members of the National Assembly of the Republic of Korea proposed a bill to include taxis in the scope of public transportation in 2012, but bus drivers and operators decided to suspend the operation of buses in Korea in protest. In addition, the bill was opposed by the South Korean government. In April 2023, another bill has been put forward to include taxis in the group of public transportation methods.

=== Accommodations ===
Public transportation in South Korea lack accommodations for people with disabilities. For buses, there are low floor buses with low footrest heights and though they have increased in number compared to the past, they are still lacking. There are some areas where low-floor buses have difficulty running, making people who use them face difficulty when traveling to those areas. For subways, there are elevators and spaces for wheelchairs to help people with disabilities travel, however these places are often crowded and used by other passengers as well. Even for taxis (which are still being debated on being a part of public transportation), people with disabilities must reserve priorly to ride a taxi, and even then, usually have to wait a long time before it arrives. The lack of accommodations in the transportation system also has a social effect, as it has affected the number of people with disabilities who leave their homes to travel.

== Roads ==
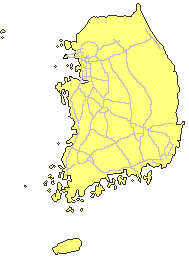
Expressway arteries throughout South Korea

Highways in South Korea are classified as freeways (expressways/motorways), national roads and various classifications below the national level. Almost all freeways are toll highways and most of the expressways are built, maintained and operated by Korea Expressway Corporation (KEC).

The freeway network serves most parts of South Korea. Tolls are collected using an electronic toll collection system. KEC also operates service amenities (dining and service facilities) en route.

There are also several privately financed toll roads. Nonsan-Cheonan Expressway, Daegu-Busan Expressway, Incheon International Airport Expressway, Seoul-Chuncheon Expressway and parts of the Seoul Ring Expressway are wholly privately funded and operated BOT concessions. Donghae Expressway was built in cooperation between KEC and the National Pension Service.

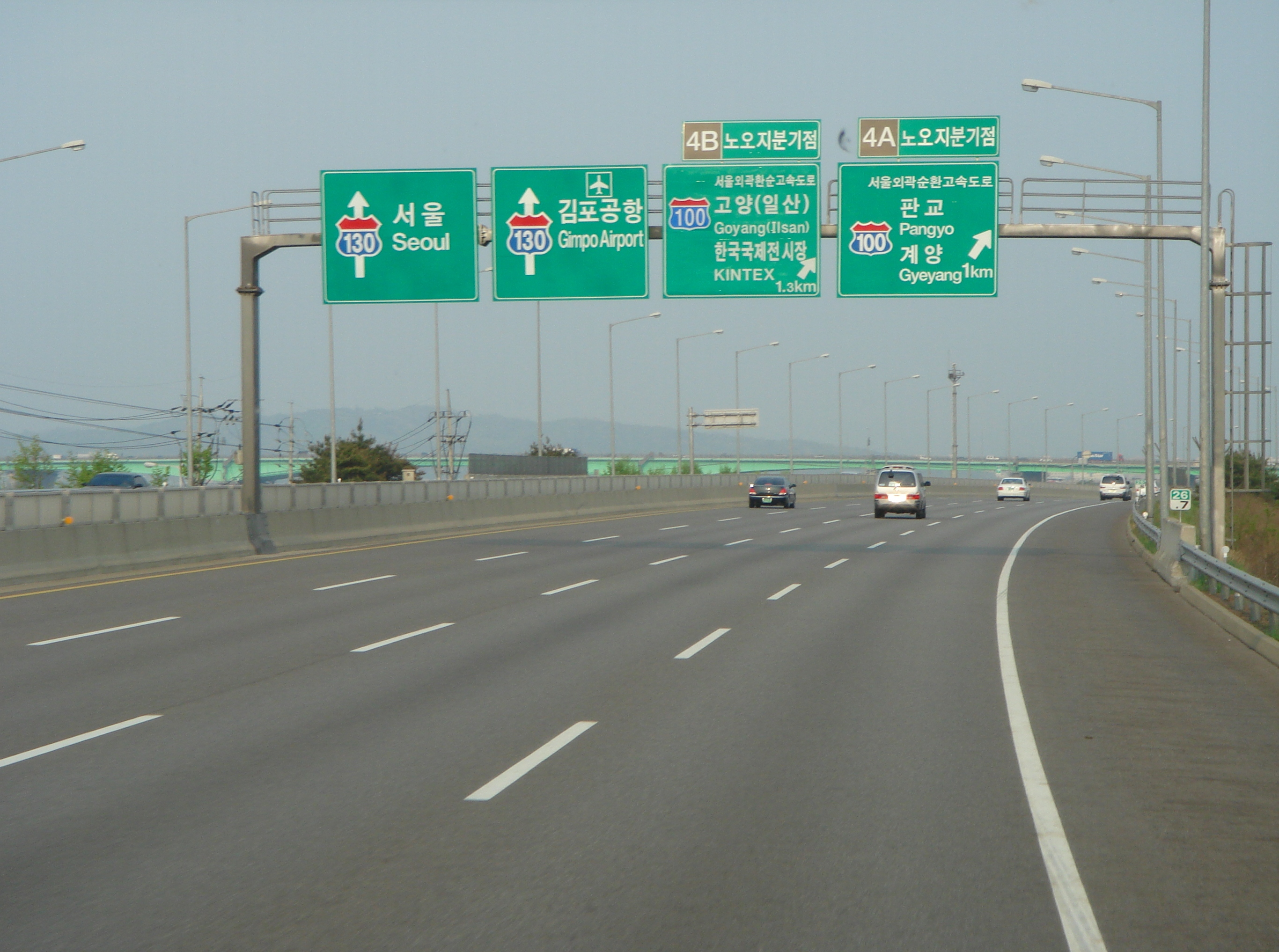
Approaching Seoul from Incheon International Airport

Total length of the South Korean road network was 86,989 km in 1998. Of this, 1,996 km was expressways and 12,447 km national roads. By 2009, combined length of the expressways had reached approximately 3,000 km, it mostly equal to the whole area of South Korea

Total (2014)	Expressways	National roads	Paved	Unpaved
105,672 km	4,138 km	13,708 km	89,701 km	8,218 km

== Bicycle ==
In Korea, there is a record that Seo Jae-pil first introduced bicycles in 1895 after returning from the U.S. in the 1890s and toured the construction site of Independence Gate. At that time, it was called a wheelbarrow, but the government named it Bicycle in the 1903s.

When other public transportation is crowded, office workers often use bicycles as a faster transportation method when commuting. As the number of bicycle riders increased, almost every part of the country also built bike lanes. Bicycle-only roads are mainly accessible, and are designed to reduce the contact accidents between pedestrians and bicycles.

=== Social Benefits ===
There are many bicycle clubs in South Korea, as many people enjoy riding bicycles as a leisure activity. Many join bicycle clubs so they can build a bond between people and live a healthier life. However, there are growing calls for improvement as they are driving on motorways rather than bicycle lanes, and are feared to cause contact accidents between bicycles and cars.

== Waterways ==
Virtually cut off from the Asian mainland, South Korea is a seafaring nation, with one of the world's largest shipbuilding industries and an extensive system of ferry services. South Korea operates one of the largest merchant fleets serving China, Japan and the Middle East. Most fleet operators are large conglomerates, while most ferry operators are small, private operators.

There are 1,609 km of navigable waterways in South Korea, though use is restricted to small craft.

=== Ferries ===
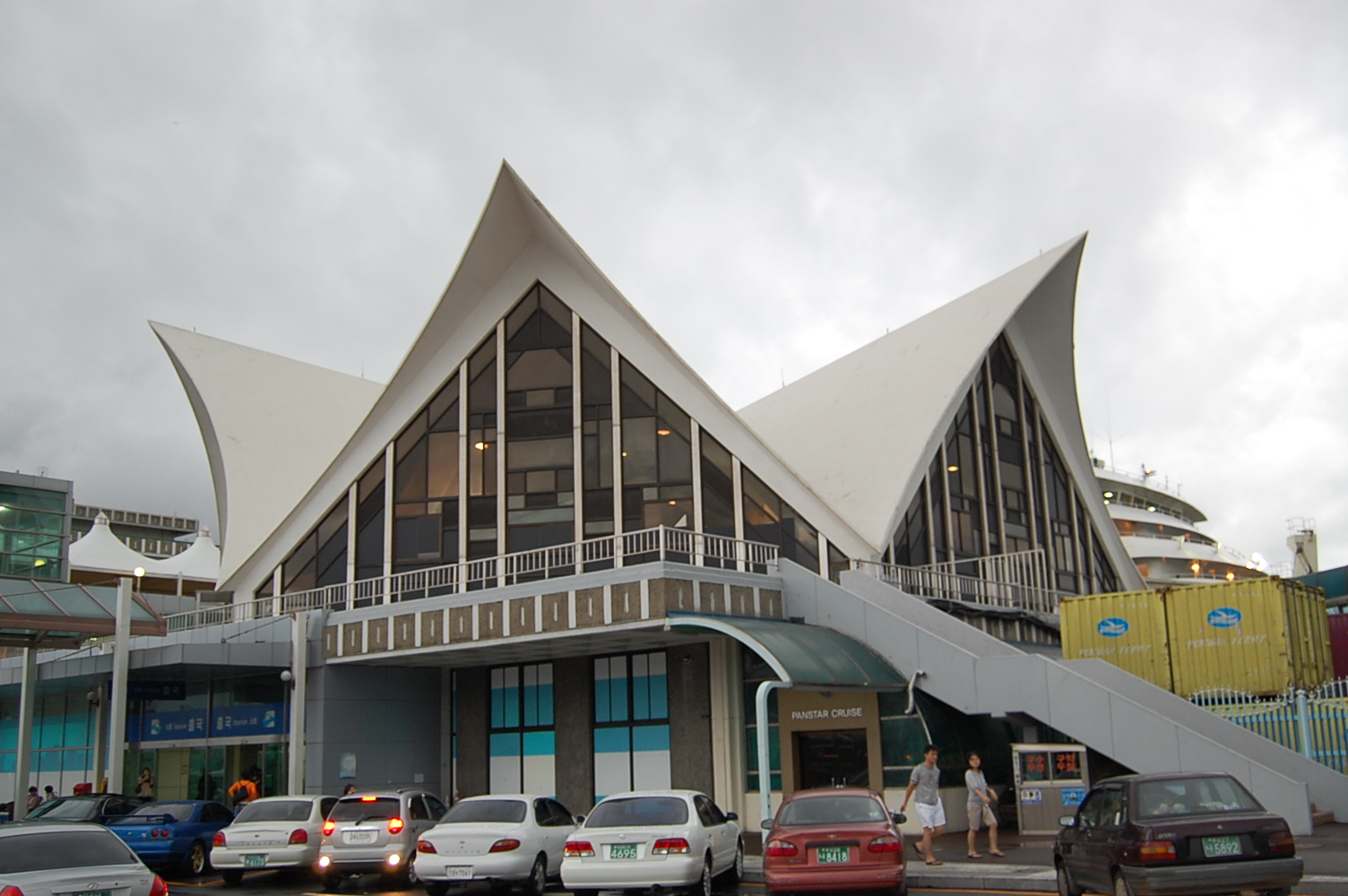
Busan International Ferry Terminal

The southern and westerns coasts of the country are dotted with small islands which are served by ferries. In addition, the larger offshore Jeju and Ulleung Islands are also served by ferry. Major centres for ferry service include Incheon, Mokpo, Pohang and Busan, as well as China and Japan.

=== Ports and harbours ===
The cities have major ports Jinhae, Incheon, Gunsan, Masan, Mokpo, Pohang, Busan ( Busan Port), Donghae, Ulsan, Yeosu, Jeju.

=== Merchant Marine ===
In 1999, there was a total of 461 merchant ships (1,000 GT or over) totalling 5,093,620 GT/8,100,634 tonnes deadweight (DWT). These are divisible by type as follows:

- bulk 98
- cargo 149
- chemical tanker 39
- combination bulk 4
- container 53
- liquefied gas 13
- multi-functional large load carrier 1
- passenger 3
- petroleum tanker 61
- refrigerated cargo 26
- roll-on/roll-off 4
- specialised tanker 4
- vehicle carrier 6

== Air travel ==
Korean Air was founded by the government in 1962 to replace Korean National Airlines and has been privately owned since 1969. It was South Korea's sole airline until 1988. In 2008, Korean Air served 2,164 million passengers, including 1,249 million international passengers.

A second carrier, Asiana Airlines, was established in 1988 and originally served Seoul, Jeju and Busan domestically and Bangkok, Singapore, Japan and Los Angeles internationally. By 2006, Asiana served 12 domestic cities, 66 cities in 20 foreign countries for commercial traffic and 24 cities in 17 countries for cargo traffic.

Combined, South Korean airlines currently serve 297 international routes. Smaller airliners, such as Air Busan, Jin Air, Eastar Jet and Jeju Air, provide domestic service and Japan/Southeast Asian route with lower fares.

South Korea contains the busiest passenger air corridor as measured by passengers per year. Over ten million people traveled between Seoul Gimpo Airport and Jeju in 2015 alone. As competition is fierce and prices affordable, the trend has been increasingly towards more air travel on this route. Similarly, air travel is also growing between Jeju and other mainland airports. There is discussion about a Jeju Undersea Tunnel which would make many of these domestic flights redundant.

Along other routes, air travel competes with the KTX high speed rail service and has declined in the 2000s and 2010s.

=== Airports ===
Construction of South Korea's largest airport, Incheon International Airport, was completed in 2001, in time for the 2002 FIFA World Cup. By 2007, the airport was serving 30 million passengers a year. The airport has been selected as the "Best Airport Worldwide" for four consecutive years since 2005 by Airports Council International.

Seoul is also served by Gimpo International Airport (formerly Kimpo International Airport). International routes mainly serve Incheon, while domestic services mainly use Gimpo. Other major airports are in Busan and Jeju.

There are 103 airports in South Korea (1999 est.) and these may be classified as follows.

Airports with paved runways:
total: 67
over 3,047 m: 1
2,438 to 3,047 m: 18
1,524 to 2,437 m: 15
914 to 1,523 m: 13
under 914 m: 20 (1999 est.)

Airports with unpaved runways:
total: 36
over 3,047 m: 1
914 to 1,523 m: 3
under 914 m: 32 (1999 est.)

Heliports: 203 (1999 est.)

== Etiquette ==
In South Korean buses and subways, proper etiquette includes not talking or calling loudly as the systems are used by many other people, keeping the facilities clean, and avoiding the consumption of foods. For safety reasons, passengers board in order and get off in turn. In the subway, the proper system of passengers getting on and off is considered to be waiting for passengers to get off first and then getting on. Younger individuals are expected to give up their seat when the elderly and the weak board on the bus or subway as well.

== Pipelines ==
- South–North Pipeline Korea
- Trans Korea Pipeline

These pipelines are for petroleum products. Additionally, there is a parallel petroleum, oils and lubricants (POL) pipeline being completed

== See also ==
- Transportation in North Korea
- The Korea Transport Institute
- Plug-in electric vehicles in South Korea
