= PXP =

PXP may refer to:

- Pony Express Pipeline, a 760-mile (1,220 km) pipeline
- Plains Exploration & Production, a petroleum and natural gas exploration company
- Pacific Air Transport, the former ICAO code
