= Double H Pipeline =

American crude oil pipeline

Location
- Country: United States
- Start: Dore, North Dakota
- To: Guernsey, Wyoming

General information
- Type: Crude oil
- Owner: Kinder Morgan Inc.

Technical information
- Length: 462 mi (744 km)

Double H Pipeline is a 462-mile (744 km) crude oil pipeline from Dore, North Dakota to Guernsey, Wyoming. It is supposed to carry 100,000 barrels (50,000 initially) of crude oil from the North Dakota Bakken formation shale plays as well as Montana and Wyoming oil fields.

Participates in a joint tariff transportation arrangement with Tallgrass Pony Express Pipeline to transport oil from Seiler Station at Baker, MT to delivery points at the Phillips 66 Refinery at Ponca City, OK and Deeprock Terminal at Cushing Oklahoma.

Double H Pipeline also delivers to other connecting pipelines at Guernsey, Wyoming.

== Overview ==
The project was proposed by Hiland Crude, LLC a subsidiary of Hiland Partners that was owned by the Harold Hamm family from Enid, Oklahoma.

The 12-inch line was scheduled to begin operating after completion in January 2015. It would connect to the Pony Express Pipeline owned by Tallgrass Energy to connect with the crude oil hub of Cushing, Oklahoma and access lucrative oil markets.

In January 2015, it was reported that Hamm was selling the Bakken pipeline network to Kinder Morgan Inc.

== See also ==
- Tallgrass Energy Partners
- List of oil pipelines
- List of oil refineries
