= Kinder Morgan Interstate Gas Transmission =

Natural gas pipeline system

Kinder Morgan Interstate Gas Transmission was a natural gas pipeline system that brought gas from the Rocky Mountains into Missouri and Nebraska, where it joined other pipes to go on towards the Midwest. Prior to being purchased by Kinder Morgan Energy Partners, it was named KN Energy and Kansas Nebraska Pipeline. Its FERC code is 53.

In 2012, Tallgrass Energy Partners (FERC code 1007) bought this pipeline (See Tallgrass Interstate Gas Transmission).

== See also ==
- List of North American natural gas pipelines
