= Samsun–Ceyhan pipeline =

Turkish oil pipeline which was not built

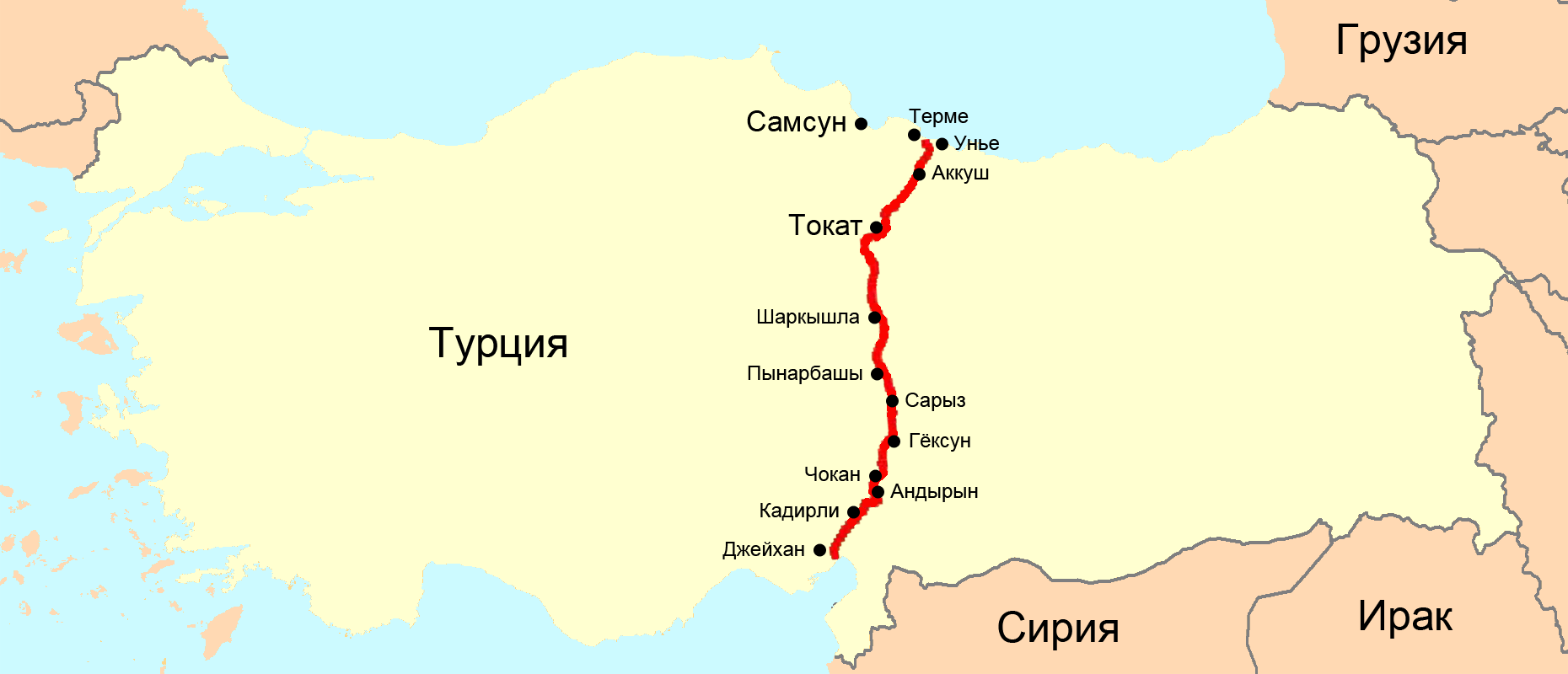
- Location of Samsun–Ceyhan pipeline

Location
- Country: Turkey
- Direction: north–south
- Start: Ünye
- Passes through: Tokat, Sarız, Göksun, Andırın, Kadirli
- To: Ceyhan
- Runs alongside: Baku–Tbilisi–Ceyhan pipeline

General information
- Type: oil
- Partners: Eni, Çalık Enerji, Rosneft, Transneft,
- Operator: Trans-Anatolian Pipeline Company
- Commissioned: 2014

Technical information
- Length: 550 km (340 mi)
- Maximum discharge: 1.5 million barrels per day (240×10^{3} m^{3}/d)

The Ünye–Ceyhan pipeline, commonly known with its former name, the Samsun–Ceyhan pipeline, was a planned crude oil pipeline traversing Turkey from the Black Sea to the Mediterranean oil terminal in Ceyhan. The aim of the project was to provide an alternative route for Russian and Kazakhstani oil and to ease the traffic burden in the Bosporus and the Dardanelles. The project was halted in 2010. This was confirmed again in 2013.

== History ==
The Samsun–Ceyhan pipeline was planned as a Bosphorus bypass. At the beginning of the 2000s, Tun Oil filed for construction of a pipeline from Samsun through Sivas to Ceyhan. In 2003, the Italian energy company Eni studied possible oil transport routes from the North Caspian area. In 2004, based on the pre-feasibility study, the Samsun–Ceyhan route was selected. Another partner in the project, Turkish company Çalık Enerji, carried out technical and commercial studies, and filed for the construction licence on 31 March 2004. One of the route alternatives involved connecting the Kırıkkale refinery; however, this option was rejected.

On 26 September 2005, Eni and Çalık Enerji signed a Memorandum of Understanding for their joint cooperation in the project. A pipeline feasibility study was completed in March 2006. The construction licence was granted in June 2006. The Front End Engineering Design Phase was completed at the beginning of 2007, and the ground-breaking ceremony, attended by the Italian Minister for Economic Development Pier Luigi Bersani and the Turkish Minister for Energy and Natural Resources Hilmi Güler, was held in Ceyhan on 24 April 2007. On 13 September 2007, the pipeline was rerouted to start from Ünye instead of Samsun and end at Yumurtalık, although it would still pass through Ceyhan. The new route shortened the pipe by 100 kilometres (62 mi).

On 19 October 2009, at a ceremony held in Milan, Italy, Russia and Turkey signed an intergovernmental agreement guaranteeing a stable regulatory framework and agreeing to the participation of Russian oil companies in the pipeline project. At the same ceremony, Eni and Çalık Enerji signed a Memorandum of Understanding with Transneft and Rosneft to include Russian companies in the development of the project. In September 2010, however, Transneft president Nikolay Tokarev said in an interview that work on the project was halted due to "many questions marks about [the pipeline]".

On 27 March 2013, Turkish energy minister Taner Yıldız announced that Eni would not be allowed to go forward with the project due to company's plans for the natural gas exploration off Cyprus, and that the pipeline's project may be suspended if Çalık continues their partnership with Eni. A month later, in April 2013, the Russian Minister of Energy Alexander Novak said that the project wasn't "economical enough".

== Technical features and financing ==
The project was designed to consist of a new unloading terminal and tank farm, a pipeline from the Ünye terminal to Ceyhan, and additional storage capacity in Ceyhan. It was to be connected with the existing Ceyhan loading terminal.

The planned length of the pipeline was 550 kilometres (340 mi). Starting from Sarız, the pipeline was intended to follow the Baku–Tbilisi–Ceyhan pipeline's corridor. The diameter of the pipe was to vary from 42 inches (1,070 mm) to 48 inches (1,220 mm). It was designed to have four pumping stations and one pressure-reducing station. The designed capacity was 1.5 million barrels per day (240×10^{3} m^{3}/d) and the initial capacity was 1-million-barrels-per-day (160,000 m^{3}/d). The tank farm in Samsun was planned to have a storage capacity of 6 million barrels (950,000 m^{3}) and the additional tank farm in Ceyhan 8 million barrels (1.3×10^{6} m^{3}).

The pipeline was originally scheduled to become operational in 2012. The project costs were expected to be around $2 billion.

== Pipeline company ==
The pipeline will be constructed, owned and operated by the Trans-Anatolian Pipeline Company (TAPCO), a joint venture of Eni and Çalık Enerji incorporated in Turkey. In 2006, it was announced that Indian Oil Corporation will have a 12.5% stake in the project; however, this deal was not completed. Also Royal Dutch Shell and Total S.A. had expressed their interest in the project. In 2009, it was decided that the new partners in the project will be Rosneft and Transneft, while Lukoil and Kazakhstan have expressed interest in participating in the project.

== Environmental impact ==
As of 2006, ships passing through the Turkish Straits (the Bosporus and the Dardanelles) currently carry 120 million barrels (19,000,000 m^{3}) of crude oil annually. This figure is expected to exceed 250 million barrels (40,000,000 m^{3}) in the next 10 years. Tanker traffic in the Straits is expected to decrease by 50% when the Samsun–Ceyhan pipeline becomes operational.

== See also ==
- Burgas–Alexandroupoli pipeline
- AMBO pipeline
- Pan-European Oil Pipeline
- Odesa–Brody pipeline
- Caspian Pipeline Consortium
