= TKP =

TKP may refer to:

== Places ==
- Trans-Korea Pipeline, South Korea
- Takapoto Airport, French Polynesia (IATA:TKP)

== Political parties ==
- Communist Party of Turkey (disambiguation) (Turkish: Türkiye Komünist Partisi), numerous parties
- Communist Party of Turkmenistan (1998) (Turkmen: Türkmenistanyň Kommunistik Partiýasy)
- Tobwaan Kiribati Party, Kiribati (founded 2016)

== Other uses ==
- Tikopia language, spoken in the Solomon Islands (ISO 639-3:tkp)
