= Çalık Enerji =

Turkish energy company of the Çalık Holding

- Company type: Private
- Industry: Energy
- Founded: 1998
- Founder: Çalık Holding
- Headquarters: Istanbul, Turkey
- Products: Petroleum; Natural gas Electrical power
- Revenue: ▲1.49 billion $ (2023)
- Operating income: ▲204 million $ (2023)
- Net income: ▲258 million $ (2023)
- Total assets: ▲2.07 billion $ (2023)
- Total equity: ▲1.18 billion $ (2023)
- Number of employees: 1,430 (2023)
- Parent: Çalık Holding
- Website: www.calikenerji.com.tr/eng/

Çalik Enerji is a Turkish energy company of the Çalık Holding, which was established in 1998. The main areas of operations include:

- oil and gas exploration, production, transportation, and distribution;
- power generation, transmission, and distribution; power design and engineering;
- telecommunications services.

Çalik Enerji has oil and gas exploration and production activities in Turkey, Iraq, Afghanistan, Azerbaijan, and Turkmenistan (notably in the Ýolöten Gas Field). It will construct the Samsun-Ceyhan Pipeline with Italian company Eni to transport crude oil from the Black Sea to the Mediterranean Sea. It also operates power plants in Turkey and Turkmenistan.

In 2015, Mitsubishi Corporation announced a strategic alliance with Çalık Enerji to develop infrastructure projects in Turkey and Northern Africa.
