= Pony Express Pipeline =

American crude oil pipeline

Location
- Country: United States
- Start: Guernsey, Wyoming
- To: Cushing, Oklahoma

General information
- Type: Crude oil
- Owner: Tallgrass Energy Partners

Technical information
- Length: 760 mi (1,220 km)
- Maximum discharge: 0.23 million barrels per day (~1.1×10^{7} t/a)
- No. of compressor stations: 10
- Website: Pipeline Website

The Pony Express Pipeline (PXP) is a 760-mile (1,220 km) pipeline connecting Guernsey, Wyoming with the oil hub of Cushing, Oklahoma.

== Overview ==
In 2013 agreement was reached to convert the natural gas pipeline to carry crude oil from the Bakken formation shale plays in North Dakota and Montana. It is supposed to connect with the planned Double H Pipeline. The project is being developed by Tallgrass Pony Express Pipeline, LLC (Tallgrass Energy Partners). Construction was completed in October 2014. The Pony Express Pipeline will have a capacity of 230,000 barrels per day (37,000 m^{3}/d) and be expandable to more than 400,000 barrels per day (64,000 m^{3}/d).

== See also ==
- Tallgrass Energy Partners
- List of oil pipelines
- List of oil refineries
