= Rockies Express Pipeline =

US natural gas pipeline system

Location
- Country: United States
- Direction: west-east (Zones 1 and 2) bi-directional (Zone 3)
- Start: Meeker, Colorado
- Passes through: Wyoming; Nebraska; Kansas; Missouri; Illinois; Indiana
- To: Clarington, Ohio

General information
- Type: natural gas
- Partners: Tallgrass Development; Phillips 66; Sempra U.S. Gas & Power
- Operator: Tallgrass Development
- Commissioned: 2009

Technical information
- Length: 1,679 mi (2,702 km)
- Maximum discharge: 3.6 billion cubic feet per day (37 billion cubic metres per annum)

The Rockies Express Pipeline is a 1,679-mile (2,702 km) long high-pressure natural gas pipeline system from the Rocky Mountains of Colorado to eastern Ohio. The pipeline system consists of three sections running through eight states. It is one of the largest natural gas pipelines ever built in North America. The final section of the pipeline was completed on 12 November 2009.

== Partnership ==
The pipeline is operated by Rockies Express Pipeline, LLC, a partnership between Tallgrass Energy Partners, Phillips 66 and Sempra Energy. In February 2006, Kinder Morgan Energy Partners and Sempra Energy acquired Entrega Gas Pipeline Inc., from EnCana Corporation. In June 2006, ConocoPhillips acquired 24% of the project. ConocoPhillips spun off the downstream part of its business in May 2012.

== Environmental concerns ==
The pipeline project has raised some environmental concerns. Ohio officials have asked to avoid crossing the Big Darby Creek in Pickaway County and the Little Miami River in Warren County within Caesar Creek State Park because of the risk of harming fish and other wildlife posed by drilling the pipeline beneath the rivers.

A Lawsuit by American Energy Corporation was filed against REX over the disruption of a coal mine owned by AEC beneath REX. In light of past pipeline accidents, where subsiding abandoned mines have caused pipelines to fail, the wisdom of the location of that part of the REX pipeline is of concern to pipeline industry critics.

== Technical description ==
The diameter of 1,679-mile (2,702 km) long pipeline system varies between 36 and 42 inches (910 and 1,070 mm), being primarily 42 inches (1,100 mm). The capacity of the pipeline is 3.6 billion cubic feet per day (37 billion cubic metres per annum). It operates at a maximum allowable operating pressure of 1,480 pounds per square inch (10,200 kPa). The initial cost of the pipeline was around US$5 billion.

=== REX – Entrega (Zone 1) ===
REX – Entrega is the 328-mile (528 km) long former Entrega Pipeline between the Meeker Hub in Rio Blanco County, Colorado, and the Cheyenne Hub in Weld County, Colorado. Construction of this pipeline was authorized in August 2005. The pipeline project was acquired by Rockies Express Pipeline, LLC in February 2006. The 136-mile (219 km) long segment from the Meeker Hub to the Wamsutter Hub in Sweetwater County, Wyoming, is a 36-inch (910 mm) pipeline, which has been in service since February 2006. The 192-mile (309 km) long segment from the Wamsutter Hub to the Cheyenne Hub in Weld County, Colorado, is a 36-inch (910 mm) pipeline, which has been in service since February 2007.

=== REX – West (Zone 2) ===
REX – West is a 713-mile (1,147 km) long 42-inch (1,100 mm) pipeline from Weld County, Colorado, to Audrain County, Missouri. It has a 5-mile (8.0 km) long 24-inch (610 mm) branch connecting pipeline with the Williams Energy owned Echo Springs Processing Plant.

On 31 May 2006, the Rockies Express Pipeline filed an application to construct and operate this section. The construction approval was issued by the Federal Energy Regulatory Commission (FERC) on 20 April 2007. The first 503-mile (810 km) long segment of this pipeline was commissioned on 27 December 2007, and the second 214-mile (344 km) long segment was commissioned on 16 May 2008. It is in full service since 16 May 2008.

=== REX – East (Zone 3) ===
REX – East is a 638-mile (1,027 km) long 42-inch (1,100 mm) pipeline from Audrain County, Missouri, to Clarington in Monroe County, Ohio. The Rockies Express Pipeline filed an application to construct and operate this section on 30 April 2007 and the FERC issued approval on 30 May 2008.

In June 2014, REX placed the Seneca Lateral into initial service and in January 2015, the Seneca Lateral was placed into full service with the ability to move approximately 0.6 billion cubic feet per day (6.2 billion cubic metres per annum) onto the REX mainline in Zone 3. On August 1, 2015, REX placed its Zone 3 East-to-West Project into service, making Zone 3 of the mainline fully bi-directional with the ability to move approximately 1.8 billion cubic feet per day (19 billion cubic metres per annum) of Appalachian production to Midcontinent markets.

The diameter of 1,679-mile (2,702 km) long pipeline system varies between 36 and 42 inches (910 and 1,070 mm), being primarily 42 inches (1,100 mm).The capacity of the pipeline is 3.6 billion cubic feet per day (37 billion cubic metres per annum). It operates at a maximum allowable operating pressure of 1,480 pounds per square inch (10,200 kPa). The initial cost of the pipeline was around $5 billion.

REX has filed with FERC for a 0.8 billion cubic feet per day (8.3 billion cubic metres per annum) expansion of its Zone 3 east-to-west capacity, via compression additions. This project is anticipated to be completed in Q4 2016.

== See also ==
- List of oil pipelines
