= Prometheus Gas =

Russian/Greek gas company

Prometheus Gas S.A.
- Type: Private
- Industry: Natural gas
- Founded: 1991
- Headquarters: Athens, Greece
- Area served: SE Europe
- Key people: Dimitrios Copelouzos
- Owner: Copelouzos Group (100%)
- Website: www.prometheusgas.gr

Prometheus Gas S.A. is a Greek natural gas company established in Athens in 1991 as a joint company between Gazprom Export and the Copelouzos Group, with each company holding a 50% share. In February 2023, Gazprom sold its 50% share in the company to Copelouzos.

Before the 2022 Russian invasion of Ukraine, Prometheus Gas primary objective was to import and market Russian gas in Greece. Since 2022, Greece made efforts to lower its import of Russian gas and instead raised the import of LNG. Prometheus Gas also builds natural gas transmission and distribution infrastructure.

In 2016, Prometheus started to import Russian gas under a contract with Gazprom Export. In 2017 the company signed a contract for natural gas deliveries until 2027, which was confirmed to be still in effect after Gazprom sold its share in 2023. Prometheus Gas imported approximately 1 billion cubic metres of natural gas, which was about 20% of Greece's market in 2017.

Prometheus Gas was a member of the Burgas–Alexandroupolis pipeline. The company holds a 25% share in Enelco, a Greek electricity company.

== See also ==
- Energy in Greece
