= Adria oil pipeline =

Oil pipeline in southern Europe

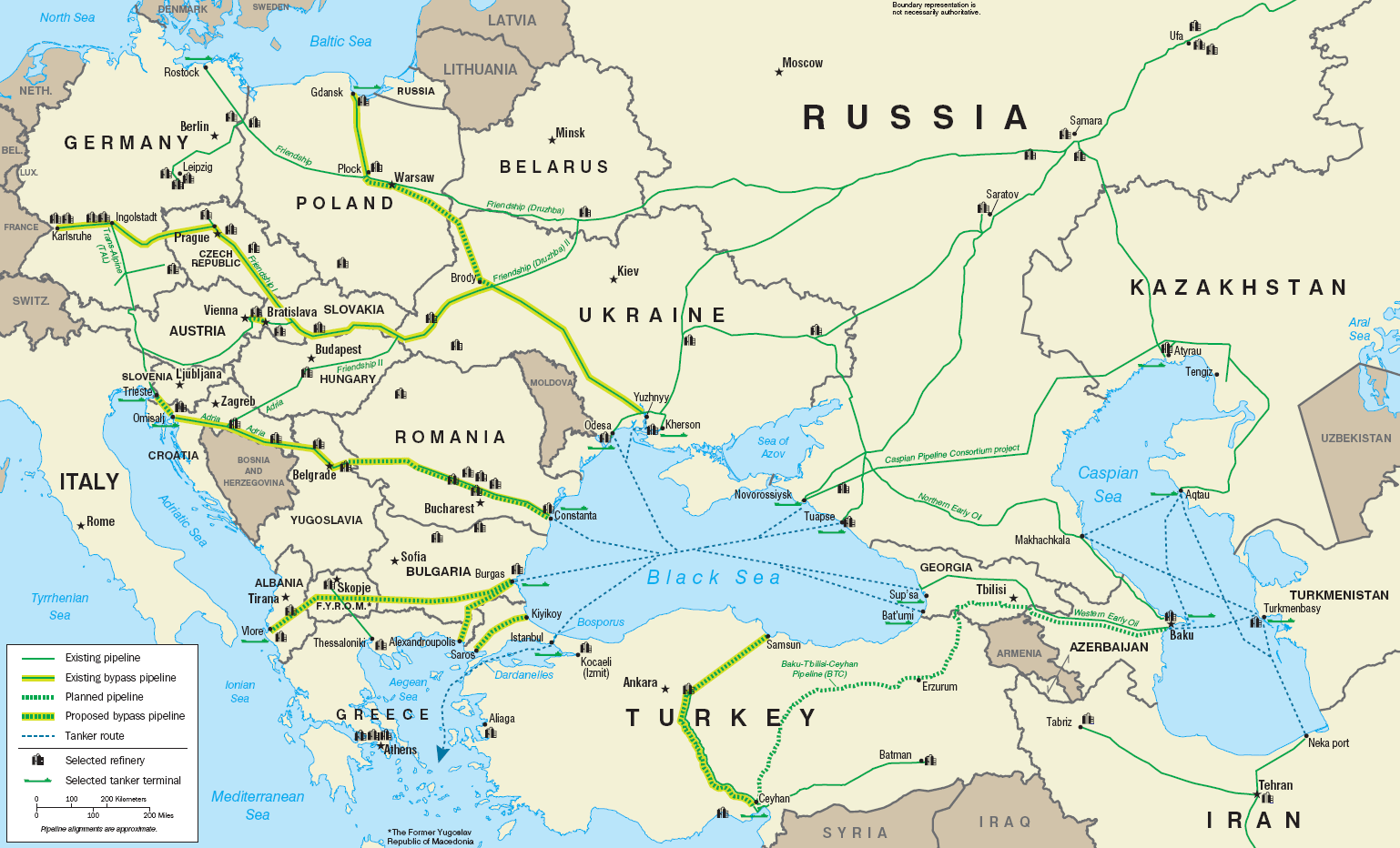
- Map of pipelines in Europe. Adria oil pipeline runs through Serbia, Croatia and Hungary.

Location
- Country: Croatia, Serbia, Hungary, Slovenia, Bosnia and Herzegovina and Slovakia
- Direction: west-north-east; west-south-east
- Start: Omišalj Oil Terminal
- Passes through: Sisak, Virje, Gola, Slavonski Brod, Vukovar, Novi Sad
- To: Százhalombatta (Duna refinery), Pančevo, Kostrena (Urinj refinery), Lendava, Bosanski Brod

General information
- Type: oil
- Operator: Jadranski naftovod, Naftna Industrija Srbije
- Commissioned: 1990

Adria oil pipeline (Note: Croatian: Jadranski naftovod, Hungarian: Adria-kőolajvezeték, Serbian: Јадрански нафтовод / Jadranski naftovod; also known as Yugoslav pipeline and JANAF pipeline) is a crude oil pipeline in Croatia, Serbia, and Hungary, with branch lines to Slovenia and Bosnia and Herzegovina.

== History ==
The idea of the Adria pipeline was first discussed in 1964 by Yugoslav officials. The plan in October 1965 proposed a pipeline with a capacity of about 10 million tonnes per annum to supply Yugoslav refineries in Croatia, Bosnia and Herzegovina, and Vojvodina in northern Serbia. It would include a branch line to the Hungarian border and pass through Ljubljana to Graz in Austria. The project was intended to supply oil refineries in Sisak, Lendava, Bosanski Brod, Novi Sad and Pančevo. In June 1966 the pipeline was to have a diameter of 510 millimetres (20 in) and its first 176 kilometres (109 mi)-long section would begin in Bakar or in Rijeka. The annual capacity of the Bakar-Sisak section was to be 17 million tonnes. From Sisak, the 107 kilometres (66 mi)-long northern branch was to be extend to the border town of Botovo, 20 kilometres (12 mi) from the Hungarian pipeline between Nagykanizsa and Budapest. The 135 kilometres (84 mi)-long eastern branch was to be extend to Bosanski Brod on the Sava River, and from there was to continue about 84 kilometres (52 mi) to the Danubian port of Vukovar. A completion date for the Bosanski Brod-Vukovar section was set on May 1, 1968. In addition, a branch from Bosanski Brod to the Danubian port of Pančevo near Belgrade was planned. This proposal was supported Croatian authorities and INA oil company. Another proposal called for a 328 kilometres (204 mi)-long pipeline from the port of Ploče, through Sarajevo, and finally to Bosanski Brod and Vukovar. This was preferred by Bosnian and Serbian authorities and companies, but was ultimately rejected.

In 1966, Czechoslovakia offered to participate in the construction of the northern branch of the Adria pipeline by supplying pipes and equipment. This offer was accepted in July 1967. Early in June 1967, preliminary talks began between Yugoslav and Austrian experts about a Bakar-Vienna pipeline (via Hungary), with a total annual capacity of 22 million tonnes. Another proposal was for an extension of the planned Yugoslav-Hungarian section to Austria. At the same time, construction of the eastern branch from Bosanski Brod to Vukovar began.

In 1968, the route from Bakar through Hungary to Bratislava was decided. On May 7, 1968, Czechoslovakia signed a memorandum with Iran calling for the supply of 15 to 20 million tonnes over a 10-year period beginning in 1970. By August 1968, an agreement between the Yugoslav, Hungarian, and Czechoslovak stakeholders was reached on the joint construction of the Bakar-Sisak-Hungary pipeline. A joint enterprise was created for the construction and operation of the pipeline, which went into operation early in 1971.

At the end of 1968, Austria invested in the Trieste-Ingolstadt pipeline and lost interest in the development of the Adria pipeline. Hungary, Czechoslovakia, and Poland became more interested in the expansion of Druzhba pipeline and construction of the Trieste-Vienna-Budapest pipeline. Disagreement between the Yugoslav companies arose as HENA and Energoinvest preferred the Ploče-Sarajevo-Bosanski Brod route.

In 1968, a dispute was raised concerning the quality of the large-diameter pipes delivered by Czechoslovakia for the eastern branch of the pipeline. API-5Lx pipes with diameter of 16 inches (410 mm) were produced by the NHG Kunčice rolling mill of Czechoslovakia. Yugoslav partners claimed that these pipe ends were not calibrated according to API specifications. In addition, improper loading equipment and shipment between Bratislava and Osijek on improperly adapted ships resulted in damage to many pipe ends. Welding frequently could not be carried out on site and production costs rose. A trial run of the Bosanski Brod–Vukovar section was carried out on April 29, 1969.

In 1969, the Yugoslav oil company Naftagas (now Naftna Industrija Srbije), the Czechoslovak enterprise Hidrostav, and the United States engineering company Bechtel signed an agreement on jointly engineering the planning of the Adriatic link and the northern branch. In October 1969, it was agreed that the northern branch of Adria pipeline would be operational by the beginning of 1974. The total capacity was planned to be 17 million tonnes annually, with Yugoslavia receiving 10 million, Czechoslovakia getting 5 million, and Hungary and Poland acquiring 2 million tonnes each. It was also agreed that the northern branch of the pipeline would extend to Poland.

In 1973, Yugoslavia's three biggest oil companies INA, Energoinvest, and Naftagas agreed to the construction of the pipeline from Omišalj port near Rijeka to the main industrial centers around Zagreb and Belgrade. The northern branch of the pipeline would be connected with the Hungarian and Czechoslovak pipeline system, while the eastern branch would be connected with the Romanian system. Each of the companies agreed to take on one third of the total costs. A joint committee (Jugoslavenski naftovod, later Jadranski naftovod) was established to manage construction and the operation of the pipeline. The agreement between Yugoslavia, Hungary, and Czechoslovakia was signed on February 12, 1974. The pipeline was to be constructed in two phases. In the initial phase, expected to be completed by the end of 1976, all pipelines and oil pools were to be constructed at Omišalj. In the second phase all other installations and storage tanks were to be completed by 1978 to enable the unloading capacity of 34 million tonnes of crude oil annually. At this stage, the pipeline was expected to cost US$350 million, of which Yugoslavia was to provide $30 million, and Hungary and Czechoslovakia $25 million each. The rest of the costs were expected to be financed by a World Bank loan.

In 1975, the expected cost was increased up to $412 million. A new financing scheme was agreed upon, according to which the World Bank would provide $49 million,Kuwait $125 million, Libya $70 million, Hungary and Czechoslovakia $25 million each, and Yugoslavia $118 million. Construction was scheduled to begin in the spring of 1976, and the first phase was to be finished in 1978.

The construction of the Adria pipeline started in 1984, and it became fully operational at the end of 1989 (alternative sources cite 1990). In 1991, as a result of the Croatian War of Independence and other Yugoslav wars, the operation of the Adria pipeline was suspended and the facilities were mothballed and maintained in operational condition by its stakeholder countries. The northern branch of Adria pipeline was re-opened at the end of 1995, and it has been used sporadically with its flow in reverse.

In February 2022, Russia has begun a large scale invasion of Ukraine; many countries have imposed sanctions against Russia. Croatia announced in March 2022 that the pipeline would cease supplying Gazprom's Serbian subsidiary NIS with crude oil in May 2022. However, in October 2022, it was announced that the ban would start on December 5, 2022, and the agreement to ship Russian oil would expire in December 2022. In December 2022, a two-year agreement was signed to supply Serbia, but not Russia, with crude oil through the pipeline.

Following disputes between regional operators regarding transportation fees and actual throughput volumes, Hungarian energy group MOL and Croatian pipeline operator JANAF began long term capacity tests on Adria oil pipeline to evaluate its ability to supply landlocked central European refineries with seaborne crude. According to independent assessments, the pipeline features an estimated annual capacity of 11 to 15 million tons, serving as a critical alternative route during disruptions to northern supply lines.

== Description ==
The Adria pipeline starts at the Omišalj Oil Terminal. From Omišalj, the main line runs to Sisak, while spur pipelines connect a terminal and refinery in Urinj. In Sisak, the northern and eastern branches split. The northern branch runs farther to Virje, where a branch continues to Lendava in Slovenia and Gola, where the pipeline crosses Croatian–Hungarian border. It continues through Hungary to the Duna refinery in Százhalombatta. Here it connects with the southern line of Druzhba and the Druzhba's branch between Hungary and Slovakia. The annual capacity of Hungarian section is 10 million tonnes of oil per annum. The maximum rated capacity in the Slovak section is 3.68 million tonnes per year.

The eastern branch runs from Sisak to Slavonski Brod. From there, the branch section continues to Bosanski Brod in Bosnia and Herzegovina, while the main line continues to Sotin at the Croatian–Serbian border. In Serbia, the pipeline stretches to Novi Sad and farther to Pančevo.

== Further connections ==
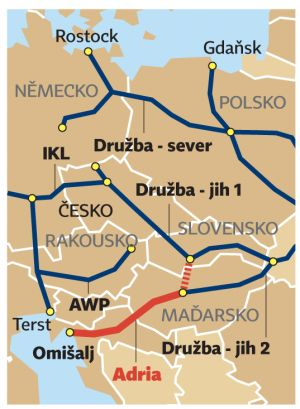

The Druzhba Adria project proposed the connection of the Adria pipeline with the Druzhba pipeline. If this had occurred, the Soviet Union would have had a direct connection to the Omišalj harbor for its oil exports. Due to environmental objections, it wasn't realized. As an alternative, the combination of these two pipelines with the proposed Pan-European Pipeline was suggested for transportation of Russian oil to Trieste. The Adria pipeline was or is indirectly linked with Druzhba pipeline in Šahy, Slovakia.
