= Ruby Pipeline =

Natural gas pipeline in the United States

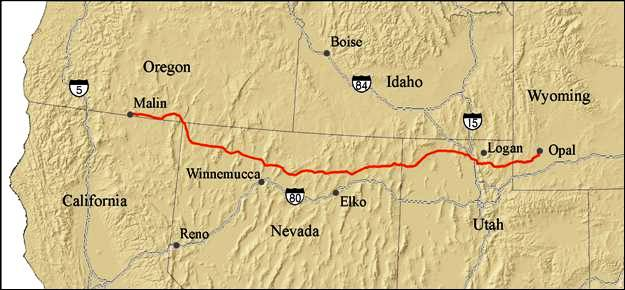
- Ruby Pipeline

Location
- Country: United States
- Direction: east-west
- Start: Opal, Wyoming
- Passes through: Wyoming, Utah, Nevada, Oregon
- To: Malin, Oregon

General information
- Type: natural gas
- Operator: Tallgrass Energy Partners
- Commissioned: 2010

Technical information
- Length: 683 mi (1,099 km)
- Maximum discharge: 1.5 billion cubic feet per day (15 billion cubic metres per year)
- Diameter: 42 in (1,067 mm)

The Ruby Pipeline is a 683-mile, 42-in. diameter natural gas pipeline running from Opal, Wyoming, to Malin, Oregon. The route crosses Northern Utah, and Northern Nevada. Ruby Pipeline, L.L.C., a child company of the El Paso Corporation, filed an application with the Federal Energy Regulatory Commission (FERC) on January 27, 2009, authorizing the construction and operation of the Ruby Pipeline Project. On April 5, 2010, the FERC approved the application. Construction began on July 31, 2010, and the pipeline was placed in service on July 28, 2011. The pipe is 683 miles (1,099 km) long with an expected capacity of 1.5 billion cubic feet per day (42×10^{6} m^{3}/d). As of 2026, it is estimated to be at around 50% utilization.

The El Paso Corporation was acquired by Kinder Morgan for $38 billion on May 25, 2012.

On April 1, 2022, Ruby Pipeline filed for Chapter 11 bankruptcy. The company received bankruptcy court approval for a $282 million sale of its assets to Tallgrass Energy Partners, a Blackstone Group company.

== Controversy ==
There is concern that the project crosses more than 1000 rivers and streams and, according to the Center for Biological Diversity, threatens some endangered fish species.

The Center for Biological Diversity and Summit Lake Paiute Tribe of Nevada petitioned the Ninth Circuit Court of Appeals for an emergency action blocking the pipeline. Despite not winning the injunction requests, the Court ultimately ruled in their favor, finding that environmental reviews for the pipeline's impacts to endangered fish species and sagebrush habitats did not comply with environmental laws.

== Proposed data center ==
In 2026, Utah's Military Installation Development Authority (MIDA), in collaboration with Canadian businessman Kevin O'Leary, announced the Stratos Project: a plan to construct a large data center campus in the Box Elder County of northern Utah, with energy infrastructure that would draw exclusively from the Ruby Pipeline. If completed, it is estimate the project could reach a capacity of 9 gigawatts generated by onsite natural gas power generation.

== Notes ==
- BLM.gov: Ruby Pipeline Project (Archived)
