= Tallgrass Interstate Gas Transmission =

Natural gas pipeline system

Tallgrass Interstate Gas Transmission (TIGT) is a 4,645-mile (7,475 km) natural gas pipeline system in the US states of Nebraska, Colorado, Kansas, Missouri, and Wyoming. It is owned by Tallgrass Energy Partners, who acquired Kinder Morgan Interstate Gas Transmission from Kinder Morgan in 2012.
