= John R. Eckel Jr. =

American businessman and art collector

John R. Eckel Jr. (October 22, 1951 – November 13, 2009) was an American businessman and art collector. He was the founder, CEO, and chairman of Houston-based Copano Energy.

== Biography ==
Eckel was born on October 22, 1951, in Houston and graduated from Columbia University in 1973. After graduating, he worked for the Mutual Life Insurance Company of New York and Lehman Brothers before joining the energy sector, working for various energy drilling, service and E&P companies. Eckel founded Copano Energy in 1992 and served as its president and CEO until April 2003, when he became chairman and CEO. Under his tenure, the company grew from having a 23-mile pipeline to a publicly trading midstream natural gas company with more than 6,000 miles of pipeline and seven processing plants across four states. He died in 2009 after suffering liver failure.

== Art collection ==
Eckel is most known for his art collection, which focused on a few American designers and artists, including Paul Evans, Harry Bertoia, Edward Ruscha, and Edward Wormley. After his death, his eponymous foundation has been focusing on supporting art groups and other charities, and his collection went to the Whitney Museum of American Art and the Museum of Fine Arts, Houston (MFAH). He is the namesake of the John R. Eckel, Jr. Foundation Gallery on the first floor of the newly opened Whitney Museum.

His collection was the subject of a 2012 exhibition titled The Spirit of Modernism: The John R. Eckel, Jr. Foundation Gift to the Museum of Fine Arts, Houston, held at the MFAH. As art collector, he was praised for having a "wonderfully holistic vision of a moment in time" by the museum's curators and for being a "brilliant, largely self-directed collector" by the Houston Chronicle.
