= Copano Energy =

Copano Energy, L.L.C.
- Company type: Public
- Traded as: Nasdaq: CPNO
- Industry: natural gas
- Founder: John R. Eckel Jr.
- Headquarters: United States
- Website: http://www.kindermorgan.com

Copano Energy, L.L.C. is a national natural gas distributor and supplier in the U.S. The company operates over 6,800 miles of natural gas transmission pipelines, with 2.7 billion cubic feet of natural gas processing capability, and 10 natural gas plants, with 1 billion cubic feet of natural gas processing capability. The served areas of the company include many states including Texas, Oklahoma and Wyoming.

In 2013, the total assets of the company was acquired by Kinder Morgan Energy Partners, LP, (KMP) at the price of $5 billion. On August 5, 2013, the company announced that it and its wholly owned subsidiary Copano Energy Finance Corporation would redeem for cash $178.5 million. Driven by the acquisition of the Company as well as drop down assets that KMP acquired from parent company Kinder Morgan Inc in 2012, KMP's certain items rise to around $665 million.
