= Jadranski naftovod =

Croatian crude oil company

Jadranski naftovod JANAF
- Type: Public
- Traded as: ZSE: JNAF
- Industry: Oil and gas
- Headquarters: Zagreb, Croatia
- Key people: Stjepan Adanić (President of the board)
- Services: Oil transportation
- Revenue: ▼€136.1 million (2024)
- Operating income: ▼€59 million (2024)
- Net income: ▼€48.3 million (2024)
- Total assets: ▲€744.7 million (2024)
- Number of employees: 441 (2024)
- Website: www.janaf.hr

Jadranski naftovod, commonly known as JANAF, is a crude oil transportation company in Croatia. It was established in 1974. It operates one of the most significant oil pipelines in Europe – the JANAF oil transport system, a part of the Adria oil pipeline. It transports crude oil from the Adriatic Sea to Central Europe.

Its headquarters is located in Zagreb, Croatia. The JANAF pipeline system runs from the port of Omišalj on the island of Krk, through Croatia, and into Slovenia, Hungary, Slovakia, Bosnia and Herzegovina and Serbia. The pipeline system spans approximately 759 kilometers.

JANAF's pipeline has a designed capacity of 34 million tons per year, having storage facilities for crude oil and petroleum products. The company operates several storage terminals, including those in Omišalj, Sisak, Virje, and Slavonski Brod. The pipeline network connects to international oil pipelines, facilitating the transportation of crude oil to various European countries.

JANAF operates oil terminal of the Port of Rijeka in Omišalj on the Krk Island. In 2020, the Port of Rijeka Liquid Cargo Terminal transported 8.1 million tonnes of oil, what is an increase of 22% compared to 6.6 million tonnes transported in 2019. In 2020, JANAF recorded annual revenue of 790 million kuna (104.9 million euro), what is 10.6% more than 2019, and annual net profit of 288.1 million kuna (38.2 million euro). This was JANAF's best business results since its establishment. JANAF is a joint stock company owned by Croatian Pension Insurance Institute (37.26%), Restructuring and Sales Center (26.28%), the Republic of Croatia (14.97%), INA (11.80%), HEP (5.36%) and other shareholders owning less than 5% of stock each. JANAF had 382 employees working in Omišalj terminal and other JANAF facilities in Croatia. JANAF plays a critical role in the energy security of Croatia and its neighboring countries by ensuring a stable supply of crude oil.
