= Tallgrass Energy Partners =

American energy company

Tallgrass
- Website: https://tallgrass.com/

Tallgrass is a leading infrastructure company focused on safely, reliably, and sustainably delivering energy. Based in Kansas City, Kansas with an operational headquarters in Denver, Colorado, and a large office in Houston, Texas, the company operates over 10,000 miles of energy infrastructure assets across 15 states. It is part of the Blackstone Group of companies.

Tallgrass was founded in 2012 and traded on the New York Stock Exchange under the symbols “TEP”, “TEGP”, and “TGE” before it was taken private in 2020.

Tallgrass operates five FERC-regulated natural gas pipelines (Rockies Express Pipeline, Ruby, Trailblazer, Tallgrass Interstate Gas Transmission and Cheyenne Connector), and East Cheyenne Gas Storage. In addition, the company operates three FERC-regulated oil pipeline systems (Pony Express, Powder River Express and Iron Horse) as well as 8.3 million barrels of oil terminal storage. Since 2020, the company has developed a robust low carbon, clean fuel, and clean energy business inclusive of projects such as the conversion of the Trailblazer pipeline to CO_{2} service, their JV partnership to produce 2+ billion gallons of sustainable aviation fuel, and their investment in Escalante H_{2} Power (EH2 Power), a first-of-its-kind hydrogen-to-power project which is working to convert a retired coal-fired power plant to a clean hydrogen-fired power generation facility.

Matthew P. Sheehy was named President & Chief Executive Officer in 2022.

== See also ==
- List of oil pipelines
