= Gwadar–Kashgar Crude Oil Pipeline =

Proposed oil pipeline between Pakistan and China

Location
- Country: Pakistan, China
- Direction: South to North
- Start: Gwadar, Pakistan
- To: Kashgar, China

General information
- Type: Crude oil
- Operator: M/s China Zhenhua Import and Export Co Ltd

The Gwadar–Kashgar Crude Oil Pipeline is a planned initiative intending to build a crude oil pipeline connecting Gwadar, Pakistan to Kashgar, China. The project has approximated an investment of a substantial amount, around $10 billion, for the pipeline's construction. The anticipated transmission capacity of the pipeline is projected to reach up to one million barrels per day.

== Background ==
The pipeline holds strategic significance by enabling diversification and acceleration of crude oil imports for Beijing. Given Gwadar's proximity to the Persian Gulf, where approximately 40% of the world's crude oil is sourced, this venture is vital. Sources suggest that China currently satisfies 50% of its oil demand by importing from the Middle East. The pipeline is expected to substantially shorten the transportation distance for delivering crude oil to China, ultimately bolstering energy security.

== Economic impact ==
The Gwadar–Kashgar Crude Oil Pipeline possesses the potential to reshape not only Pakistan's economy but also the broader region, sparking economic growth and fostering prosperity. This pipeline initiative is anticipated to stimulate economic activities, leading to positive financial outcomes for the region.
