= Burgas–Alexandroupoli pipeline =

Bulgaria-Greece gas transporter

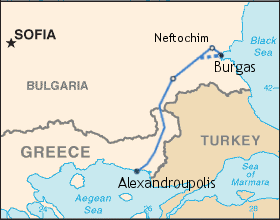
- Location of Burgas–Alexandroupoli pipeline

Location
- Country: Bulgaria, Greece
- Start: Burgas (Bulgaria)
- To: Alexandroupoli (Greece)

General information
- Type: Petroleum
- Partners: Transneft, Rosneft, Gazprom Neft, Technoexportstroy, Hellenic Petroleum, Prometheus Gas, Latsis Group, Government of Greece
- Operator: Trans-Balkan Pipeline B.V.

Technical information
- Length: 279 km (173 mi)
- Maximum discharge: 35 million tons per year
- Diameter: 36 in (914 mm)
- No. of pumping stations: 3

The Burgas–Alexandroupoli pipeline was a proposed oil pipeline project for transportation of Russian and Caspian oil from the Bulgarian Black Sea port of Burgas to the Greek Aegean port of Alexandroupoli. It was seen as an alternative route for Russian oil, bypassing the Bosporus and the Dardanelles. However, in December 2011, the project was suspended by the Bulgarian government due to environmental and supply concerns.

Bulgaria is seeking to revive this idea, and the idea was once again proposed in 2023 due to the Invasion of Ukraine.

== History ==
The pipeline project was proposed in 1993–1994 by several Russian and Greek companies. In 1994, for construction of the pipeline Greece and Bulgaria signed a bilateral agreement, followed by a memorandum of cooperation, signed by Greece and Russia.

In February 1998, a Greek consortium for pipeline construction named Bapline was established, and in May 1998, a memorandum of creation of the Transbalkan Oil Pipeline Company was signed. In 2000, a technical specifications and an economic evaluation of the project were prepared by the German company ILF.

A joint protocol for preparing the pipeline's construction was signed by the three countries in January 2005. The political memorandum between governments was signed on 12 April 2005. An inter-governmental agreement on the project was agreed on 7 February 2007, and it was signed on 15 March 2007 in Athens, by the relevant ministers of the three countries, in the presence of their leaders, Vladimir Putin (Russian president), Sergey Stanishev (Bulgarian prime-minister), and Kostas Karamanlis (prime-minister of Greece). The agreement establishing the international project company was signed in Moscow on 18 December 2007 and the company—Trans-Balkan Pipeline B.V.—was incorporated in the Netherlands on 6 February 2008.

Construction of the pipeline was scheduled to start in October 2009, and was estimated to be completed by 2011. However, the project was delayed as the Bulgarian government coming to power in July 2009 started to reconsider its participation in the project. On 19 October 2009, Italy, Russia and Turkey signed an inter-governmental agreement agreeing the participation of Russian oil companies in the competing Samsun-Ceyhan pipeline project. On 11 June 2010, Prime Minister of Bulgaria Boyko Borisov announced that Bulgaria would not participate in the project due to strong opposition from the local population of Burgas. Later it was said that the government would await an environmental impact assessment before making a final decision about termination of the project. On 7 December 2011, the Bulgarian government officially decided to terminate its participation in the project and proposed that the tripartite inter-governmental agreement be terminated by mutual consent.

In 2023, Bulgaria sought to revive this project to the Russo-Ukrainian war, and Russia producing more oil starting in 2024.

== Technical features and financing ==
The main pipeline with a diameter of 36 inches (900 mm) would be 279 kilometres (173 mi) long, and it would transport 15-23 million tons of oil per year during the first phase, as well as 35 million during the second. The pipeline would have three oil refilling stations, two of which in Bulgaria (the first one at Neftochim close to Burgas) and one at Alexandroupoli. The project included reconstruction of Burgas and Alexandroupolis terminals, including oil tanks with a capacity of 600,000 tons in Burgas, and 1,200,000 tons in Alexandroupolis.

The pipeline was expected to cost up to €1 billion. The investment scheme was not agreed, and it was not decided from which sources the pipeline would be filled.

== International project company ==
The pipeline was to be constructed and owned by the Dutch-registered Trans-Balkan Pipeline B.V. In this company, a stake of 51% of shares belongs to the Burgas–Alexandroupolis Pipeline Consortium, a joint venture of Russian Transneft, Rosneft and Gazprom Neft. Bulgarian Burgas–Alexandroupolis Project Company-BG, a subsidiary of Technoexportstroy, owns 24.5% of shares. Greece consortium HELPE S.A. - THRAKI S.A., a joint venture between Hellenic Petroleum and Thraki, which is owned by Prometheus Gas and the Latsis Group, owns 23.5%, while the Government of Greece has 1%.

There were speculations that the part of Bulgarian and Hellenic stakes could be sold to other oil companies as Chevron, TNK-BP and KazMunayGas. Kazakhstan's Energy Minister Baktykozha Izmukhambetov had said that Kazakhstan wants to buy a stake in the pipeline consortium.

== Controversy ==
There were several competitive pipeline projects, such as the AMBO pipeline from Burgas to Vlorë, Pan-European Pipeline from Constanţa to Trieste, Odesa-Brody-Plotsk pipeline, Kıyıköy-İbrice pipeline, and Samsun-Ceyhan pipeline — all aimed to transport oil from the Black Sea bypassing Turkish straits. The project of the Burgas–Alexandroupoli pipeline was described as one of the shortest pipeline through a plain terrain and therefore to be one of the cheapest and cost effective. The critics of the Burgas–Alexandroupoli pipeline project raised environmental concerns because of oil tankers traffic in the Aegean Sea, which contains numerous submerged rocks and island populations dependent on tourism and fishing. It has been mentioned that a possible oil spill in the Aegean would be devastating for Greece's tourism industry. The residents of Burgas and Sozopol in Bulgaria voted against in the pipeline in local referendums in the spring of 2008.

== See also ==
- AMBO pipeline
- Pan-European Pipeline
- Odesa–Brody pipeline
- Samsun–Ceyhan pipeline
- Baku–Tbilisi–Ceyhan pipeline
- Caspian Pipeline Consortium
- South Stream
- Trans-Balkan Pipeline
