= Bangladesh–India Friendship Pipeline =

Oil pipeline

Bangladesh-India Friendship Pipeline

Location
- Country: Bangladesh; India
- Coordinates: 26.62°N 94.67°E; 25.62°N 88.70°E
- Start: Siliguri, India
- Passes through: Plains
- To: Parbatipur Upazila, Dinajpur District, Bangladesh

General information
- Type: Oil
- Partners: Numaligarh Refinery Limited; Bangladesh Petroleum Corporation
- Construction started: 2020
- Expected: June 2022
- Commissioned: March 18, 2023

Technical information
- Length: 131.5 km (81.7 mi)
- Maximum discharge: 200,000–1,000,000 metric tons/year

Bangladesh–India Friendship Pipeline, or simply as Bangladesh-India Pipeline, is a pipeline for the purpose of transporting oil between Bangladesh and India. The construction of the pipeline was completed in June 2022. On 18 March 2023, then Prime Minister of Bangladesh, Sheikh Hasina, and the Prime Minister of India, Narendra Modi, virtually inaugurated the project.

== History ==
With the goal of importing fuel oil through the pipeline, the construction work for the Bangladesh–India Friendship Pipeline project was officially inaugurated in 2020. Once the 131.5 kilometers pipeline is completed, fuel oil will be transported directly through the pipeline from India's Numaligarh Refinery Limited to the Parbatipur oil depot in Dinajpur, Bangladesh. This is expected to alleviate the fuel crisis in the northern region of the country. The pipeline installation work in a place called Sonapukur in Parbatipur Upazila was inaugurated by Md. Abu Bakar Siddique, Chairman of Bangladesh Petroleum Corporation (BPC). On 9 April 2018, a memorandum of understanding was signed between Bangladesh and India regarding the import of diesel through the 131.5 kilometers pipeline from Numaligarh in India to the Parbatipur depot in Bangladesh. Subsequently, on 18 September 2018, the Prime Ministers of the two countries laid the foundation stone for the project via video conference. It was announced that out of the 131.5 kilometers, 5 kilometers of the pipeline would be on the Indian side and 126.5 kilometers would be laid up to Parbatipur in Dinajpur on the Bangladesh side. Under this project, India will spend 346 crore rupees, while Bangladesh will spend 306 crore 23 lakh taka. Once the project is completed by June 2022, fuel oil will be directly imported from India to Bangladesh through the pipeline.

== Duration and supply volume ==
India's state-owned company, Numaligarh Refinery Limited, will supply diesel to Bangladesh's Parbatipur oil head depot through the pipeline for a period of 15 years. Upon implementation of the project, 200,000 metric tons of oil will be supplied in the first three years, 300,000 metric tons over the following three years, 500,000 metric tons over the next four years, and 1 million metric tons over the remaining five years.
