= Mumbai–Manmad Pipeline =

The Mumbai Manmad Bijwasan Pipeline (MMBPL) was one of the most ambitious projects undertaken by BPCL [Bharat Petroleum Corporation Limited]. The project commenced in mid-1998 and involved the laying of a 252 km long petroleum product pipeline from Mumbai on the Arabian sea coast to Manmad, near Nashik, located in North-Eastern Maharashtra. Subsequently, by March 2007, the pipeline was extended from Manmad to Bijwasan near New Delhi's Indira Gandhi International Airport. The total length of the MMPL pipeline, reaching from Mumbai to the outskirts of New Delhi, is approximately 1,500 km.

The details of pipeline sections are as under:

Mumbai - Manmad - 18" x 252 km (approx.) long - Externally Coal tar enamel coated

Manmad - Manglya - 14" x 350 km (approx.) long - Externally coal tar enamel coated (Note-1)

Manmad - Piyala - Bijawasan - 18" / 8" - 750 km long - Externally 3 LPE coated.

Note-1: Only Pipeline section across Narmada River of approx. 1000 m long was provided with 3 Layer PE Coated.

In all the phases, M/s Engineers India Limited has been the Project Management Consultant responsible from concept to commissioning of the entire pipeline system.

The MMBPL department of Bharat Petroleum is currently headed by Mr. L. R. Jain (CGM, Pipelines), Mr. Sehgal (General Manager, Operations - Product Pipelines) and Mr. S.K Agarwal (General Manager, ROU & HSSE - Pipelines).

The MMBPL department has set high standards in the field of product pipelines. The experience in laying the Mumbai-Manmad-Bijwasan pipeline was utilised by Bharat Petroleum to lay a crude-oil pipeline from Vadinar on the West coast to Bina in Madhya Pradesh, where a new 6 million tonnes per year grassroot refinery was commissioned. The success achieved by the MMBPL department has made it almost certain that the pipeline department will become a "Strategic Business Unit" or SBU of Bharat Petroleum Corporation Limited in the near future.

Online monitoring of the status of the product and pipeline has been made possible by the use of SCADA (Supervision Control and Data Acquisition) Software. Advanced techniques are also employed in pigging operations. The department also conducts studies in various aspects of pipeline management, like minimizing interface, cathodic protection etc.
