= ATEX Pipeline =

Oil pipeline in the eastern US

ATEX Pipeline (Appalachia-to-Texas Express) is a 1,230-mile (1,980 km) long oil pipeline, carrying ethane. The ATEX pipeline starts in Washington County, Pa., and is connected to four fractionators in the Marcellus-Utica shale region, including the MarkWest Houston plant in Pennsylvania and Cadiz plant in Ohio, the Blue Racer Natrium plant in West Virginia, and the Utica East Ohio Scio plant. It is owned and operated by Enterprise Products Partners.

== Accidents and incidents ==
On January 16, 2015, the 20 inch ATEX-1 pipeline failed, in Brooke County, West Virginia. About 1,283,000 gallons of ethane were released, and burned. A nearby house was damaged. A survey of the failure site comparing the elevation of the pipeline at the failure location to the as-built map elevations was conducted during the excavation and remediation process. The survey indicated that the pipe had dropped more than 3 feet since the line was originally constructed. A geotechnical survey conducted by Pennsylvania Soil and Rock determined that the failed pipe was installed across a transition area or “head wall” of an old underground mine and surface strip mine. In addition, the soil on which the pipeline was laid had undergone little consolidation since the mining was completed.
