= Longhorn Pipeline =

Oil pipeline in the southern US

Longhorn Pipeline started as a 450-mile pipeline, from Houston, Texas, to Crane, Texas, in the Permian Basin, that was built in the 1950s to carry West Texas crude oil to Gulf Coast refineries. In 1995, Longhorn Partners acquired that pipeline, with the aim of reversing its flow, to carry gasoline and other refined products from Houston-area refineries to markets in West Texas, New Mexico, and Arizona. The pipeline was lengthened to 700 miles.

As part of an environmental agreement, Longhorn Partners replaced 19 miles of that 1950s-vintage pipe, over a section of the Edwards Aquifer, near Austin, Texas, with thicker-walled pipe.

In 2013, Longhorn was switched back to its original flow direct of west to east, and, switched back to crude oil shipping.

== Accidents and incidents ==
On August 13, 2013, Longhorn leaked about 300 gallons of crude oil at a valve, in southwest Austin, Texas.
