= Trans-Korea Pipeline =

Petroleum pipeline in South Korea

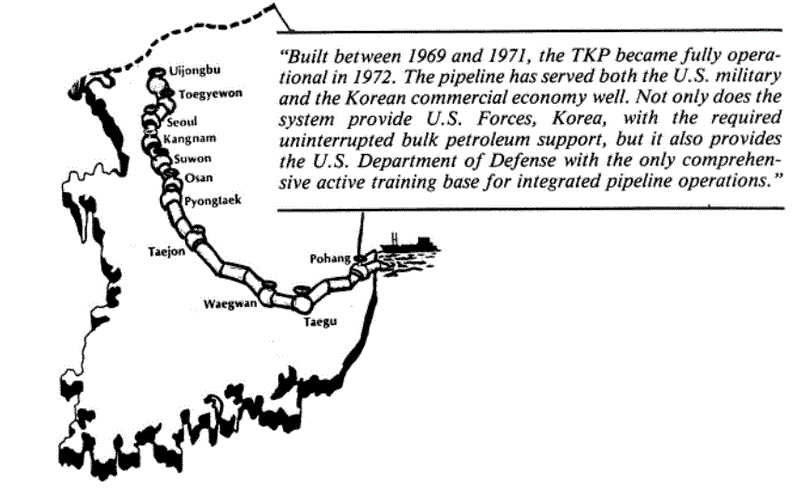
Map of 1985.

The Trans-Korea Pipeline (TKP) is a north-south petroleum pipeline in South Korea. Since 1970 the pipeline was used to transport petroleum products for United States Forces Korea (USFK) and South Korea's oil refiners. The USFK originally owned the TKP and in 1992 it was transferred to the Korean Ministry of National Defense. In 1999, the pipeline operation was consigned to the Deahan Oil Pipeline Corporation (DOPCO).

The original pipe was 452 kilometre from the southern port city of Pohang to Euijeongbu near the Demilitarized Zone.

There were about 18 times leakage of oil occurred before replaced by the South-North pipeline (SNP).

In 2004 an agreement was reached where the USFK will obtain fuel from the commercial South-North Pipeline (SNP), using only portions of the TKP from the commercial terminal at Songnam to Suwon and Osan Air Bases and storage tanks at Pyongtaek.
