= AMBO pipeline =

Bulgaria-Albania gas transporter

Location
- Country: Bulgaria; Republic of North Macedonia; Albania
- Direction: east-west
- Start: Burgas
- To: Vlorë

General information
- Type: Oil
- Operator: Albanian Macedonian Bulgarian Oil Corporation

Technical information
- Length: 912 km (567 mi)
- Maximum discharge: 750,000 barrels per day (119,000 m^{3}/d)

AMBO pipeline was a planned oil pipeline from the Bulgarian Black Sea port of Burgas via the Republic of North Macedonia to the Albanian Adriatic port of Vlorë.

== History ==
The pipeline was proposed in 1993. On 27 December 2004, prime-ministers of Albania, the Republic of North Macedonia and Bulgaria signed the latest political declaration, followed by the memorandum of understanding between representatives of Albania, the Republic of Macedonia and Bulgaria and Ted Ferguson, the president and CEO of AMBO. On 30 October 2006, Albania and the Republic of North Macedonia signed a protocol to determinate the entrance points of the pipeline. The entrance point will be Stebleve village in Albania and Lakaica village in the Republic of Macedonia. A similar protocol between Bulgaria and the Republic of North Macedonia was signed later in 2006.

On 31 January 2007, the Republic of North Macedonia, Bulgaria and Albania signed a trilateral convention on the construction of the AMBO pipeline. This document was ratified by the Parliaments of all three countries and governed the construction, operation, and maintenance of the pipelines.

In 2006, intervention was proposed by Russia (President Putin) with a proposal for a competing pipeline from Burgas to Alexandropoulos in Greece. The financing of this was to be by Russia and was tied to the finance of an Atomic Energy Power Plant. It took at least four years for the Russian proposal to be discarded. By which time shipping in the Bosphorus had settled into an acceptable operation and shippers/investors were reluctant to commit financing.

== Description ==
The aim of the 912-kilometre (567 mi) long pipeline was to bypass the Turkish Straits in transportation of Russian and Caspian oil. The pipeline was expected to cost about US$1.5 billion and it would have a capacity of 750,000 barrels per day (119,000 m^{3}/d). There would be four pump stations, two in Bulgaria and one each in the Republic of North Macedonia and Albania, constructed along the route. A pre-front-end engineering and design study (FEED) was to be prepared by KBR. The pipeline was expected to be operational by 2011.

== Project company ==
The pipeline was to be built and operated by the US-registered Albanian Macedonian Bulgarian Oil Corporation (AMBO). The project was backed by the US government, who financed a feasibility study of pipeline.

== Alternative projects ==
Other pipeline projects were the Burgas-Alexandroupoli pipeline from Burgas to the Greek Aegean port Alexandroupoli, and the Pan-European Pipeline from Constanţa in Romania to Trieste in Italy. Compared with Burgas-Alexandroupoli pipeline, the AMBO pipeline would be longer and more expensive, but Vlorë (which is a sheltered, deep-water, all-weather port) could accommodate larger tankers and is more accessible than Alexandroupoli. Also, an oil spill in the Aegean would have a negative influence on Greece's tourism industry.

== See also ==
- Burgas-Alexandroupoli pipeline
- Pan-European Pipeline
- Baku-Tbilisi-Ceyhan pipeline
- Trans-Balkan Pipeline
