= Pan-European Oil Pipeline =

Proposed gas transporter

- Location of Pan-European Oil Pipeline

Location
- Country: Romania, Serbia, Croatia, Slovenia, Italy
- Direction: east–west
- Start: Constanța
- Passes through: Rijeka
- To: Trieste

General information
- Type: oil
- Partners: Conpet Ploiești, Oil Terminal Constanța, Transnafta, JANAF
- Operator: Pan-European Oil Pipeline Project Development Company

Technical information
- Maximum discharge: 1.8 million barrels per year

The Pan-European Oil Pipeline (PEOP) is a proposed oil pipeline from Constanţa in Romania via Serbia and Croatia to Rijeka and from there through Slovenia to Trieste in Italy. The aim of the pipeline is to bypass Turkish straits in the transportation of Russian and Caspian oil to Central Europe. In Trieste the pipeline will be connected with the Transalpine Pipeline, running to Austria and Germany.

== History ==
The project was originally proposed in 2002. Signing of the memorandum of understanding on the construction of the pipeline was several times delayed until on 3 April 2007 it was signed by officials of Croatia, Italy, Romania, Serbia, and Slovenia during an energy forum in Zagreb. On 22 April 2008 Romanian, Serbian and Croatian companies signed an agreement establishing the Pan-European Oil Pipeline Project Development Company (PEOP PDC). On 10 July 2008 Shareholders adopted the Statute and appointing the Managing Board of the PEOP PDC Plc.

The national governments of Romania, Serbia and Croatia are favorable about the project. Most engaged is the President of Romania, Traian Băsescu, who has cited a study estimating the benefits of the project for Romania over 20 years of operation in the range between US$2.27 to 4.39 billion. The Government of Serbia is also politically motivated so as to decrease its dependence on crude oil supply from Croatia.

In 2006, the Government of Slovenia did not support the project because the 29 kilometres (18 mi) long stretch would pass the environmentally sensitive Karst terrain and no national interest exists regarding oil supply. Nevertheless, Slovenian representatives in 2009 expressed support for the project.

On January 15, 2010, JANAF decided to freeze its involvement in PEOP. The Romanian and Serbian companies responded by saying they would still build the pipeline from the Black Sea to the Pančevo refinery.

== Technical description ==
The 1,856 kilometres (1,153 mi) long pipeline is expected to cost about €3.5 billion. The capacity of the pipeline will be 1.2 million and 1.8 million barrels per day (~6.0×10^{7} and ~9.0×10^{7} t/a). It is planned to be operational by 2012.

== Project company ==
The pipeline project is developed by the London-registered Pan-European Oil Pipeline Project Development Company, comprising Romanian companies Conpet Ploiești and Oil Terminal Constanța, Serbian company Transnafta and Croatian company JANAF. One of the main purposes of the company is promotion of the Pan European Oil Pipeline and subsequently attracting new investors. Italian and Slovenian companies are invited to participate in the project.

== See also ==
- Burgas-Alexandroupoli pipeline
- AMBO pipeline
- Baku-Tbilisi-Ceyhan pipeline
