= South–North Pipeline Korea =

Petroleum pipeline in South Korea

The South North Pipeline (SNP) is a north–south petroleum products pipeline in the Republic of Korea owned by the Daehan Oil Pipeline Corporation (DOPCO).

DOPCO finished construction of the Kyungin pipeline between Koyang terminal and Gimpo Airport in 1992. In 1997, construction of Seongnam terminal marked the completion of the entire 900 km (560 mi) pipeline.

The United States Forces Korea obtain jet fuel through the SNP.
