= Kinder Morgan Energy Partners =

Kinder Morgan Energy Partners LP (NYSE: KMI) (KMEP) is a subsidiary of Kinder Morgan, Inc. The company, which is classified as an oil and gas master limited partnership (MLP), owns or operates petroleum product, natural gas, and carbon dioxide pipelines, related storage facilities, terminals, power plants and retail natural gas in the United States and Canada.

== History ==
Kinder Morgan Energy Partners LP, headquartered at One Allen Center in Houston, Texas, was co-founded by Richard Kinder and William Morgan. The company began in 1997, when Kinder, a former Enron executive, and Morgan purchased the liquid pipeline assets of Enron for $40 million. It has since employed many former Enron employees, including former Enron whistleblower Jordan Mintz.

Kinder Morgan is credited for bucking the trend in MLPs that traditionally deliver low double-digit total return to investors. It has produced a 26 percent compound growth rate from its founding to May 2009.

On March 1, 2002, Shares of Kinder Morgan Inc., fell to a 15-month low on concern that the company faced competition for assets and on investor wariness about its partnership arrangements. On March 1, 2002, Nova Chemicals Corp. sold its 20-per-cent share of the Cochin pipeline, and the sale, for $64 million (U.S.), is subject to right of first refusal by the other Cochin owners, which include subsidiaries of Kinder Morgan Energy Partners LP.

In May 2013, the company acquired Copano Energy LLC (NASDAQ:CPNO, closed), which is now assigned under the company's Natural Gas Pipeline section as well as under Product Pipeline section. On August 10, 2014, Kinder Morgan announced it was moving to full ownership of along with two other partly owned companies, Kinder Morgan Management, and El Paso Pipeline Partners, in a deal worth $71 billion. Kinder Morgan announced its completion of the acquisition on November 26, 2014. The combined entity became the largest midstream energy company in North America.

== Regulatory oversight ==
The majority of its pipelines fall under the regulatory oversight of the U.S. Department of Transportation. The company maintains a safety record and follows many regulations and procedures to monitor and ensure the integrity of its pipelines, despite involvement in numerous accidents as outlined below. Interstate natural gas pipelines are subject to the rate and facility regulation of the Federal Energy Regulatory Commission under the Natural Gas Act.

== Facilities ==
- Calnev Pipeline (Hazardous Liquids)
- Central Florida Pipeline (Hazardous Liquids)
- Cypress Pipeline System (Hazardous Liquids)
- Plantation Pipe Line (Hazardous Liquids)
- Portland Jet Line
- Rockies Express-West Pipeline (Gas Transmission)

== Accidents ==
Pipelines operated by this company have failed throughout the United States.

=== Suisun Marsh diesel spill ===
On April 28, 2004, a petroleum pipeline owned and operated by Kinder Morgan Energy Partners ruptured, spilling an estimated 1,500 barrels (240 m^{2}) of diesel fuel into marshes adjacent to Suisun Bay.

=== Walnut Creek gasoline fire ===
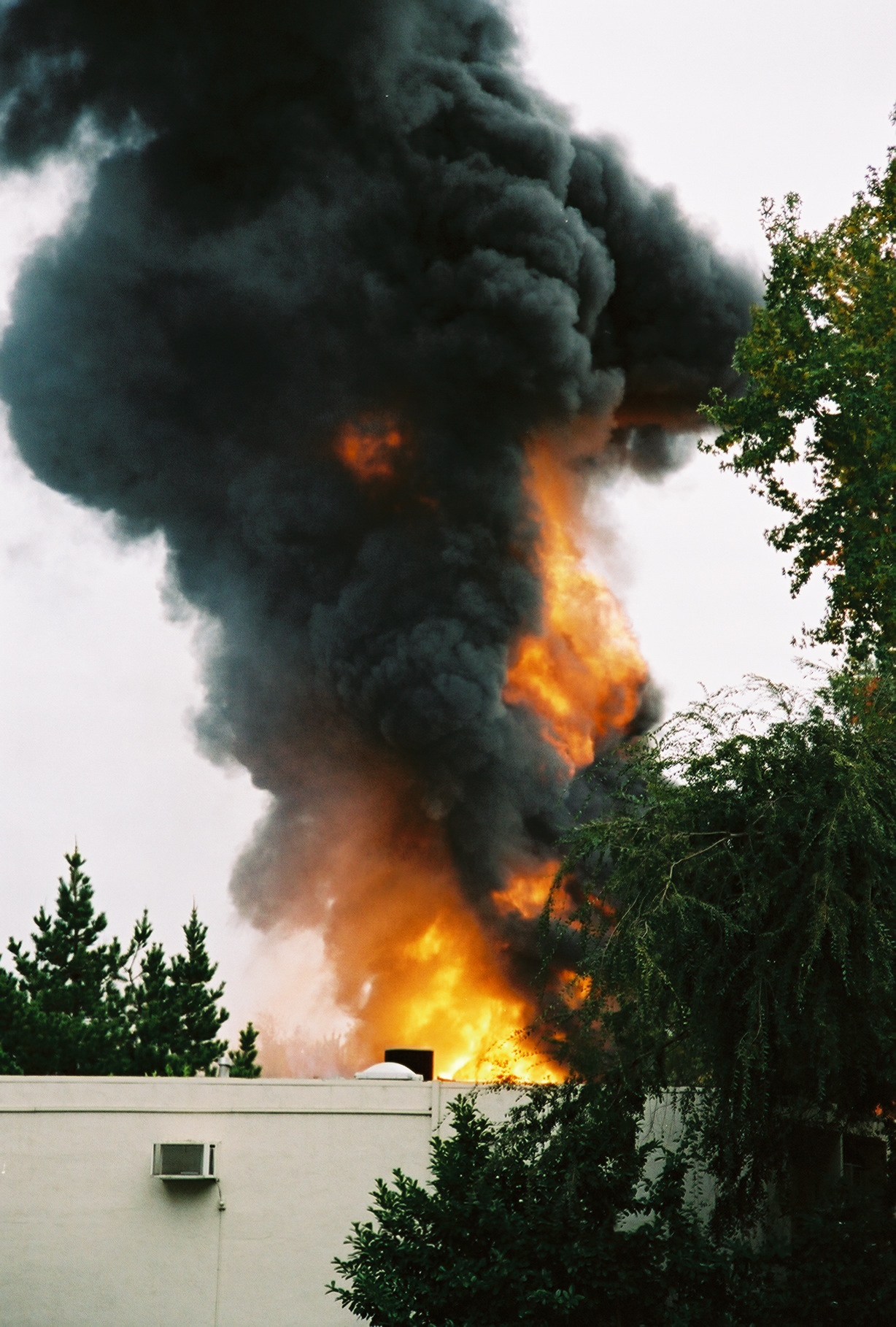
Pipeline fire flames

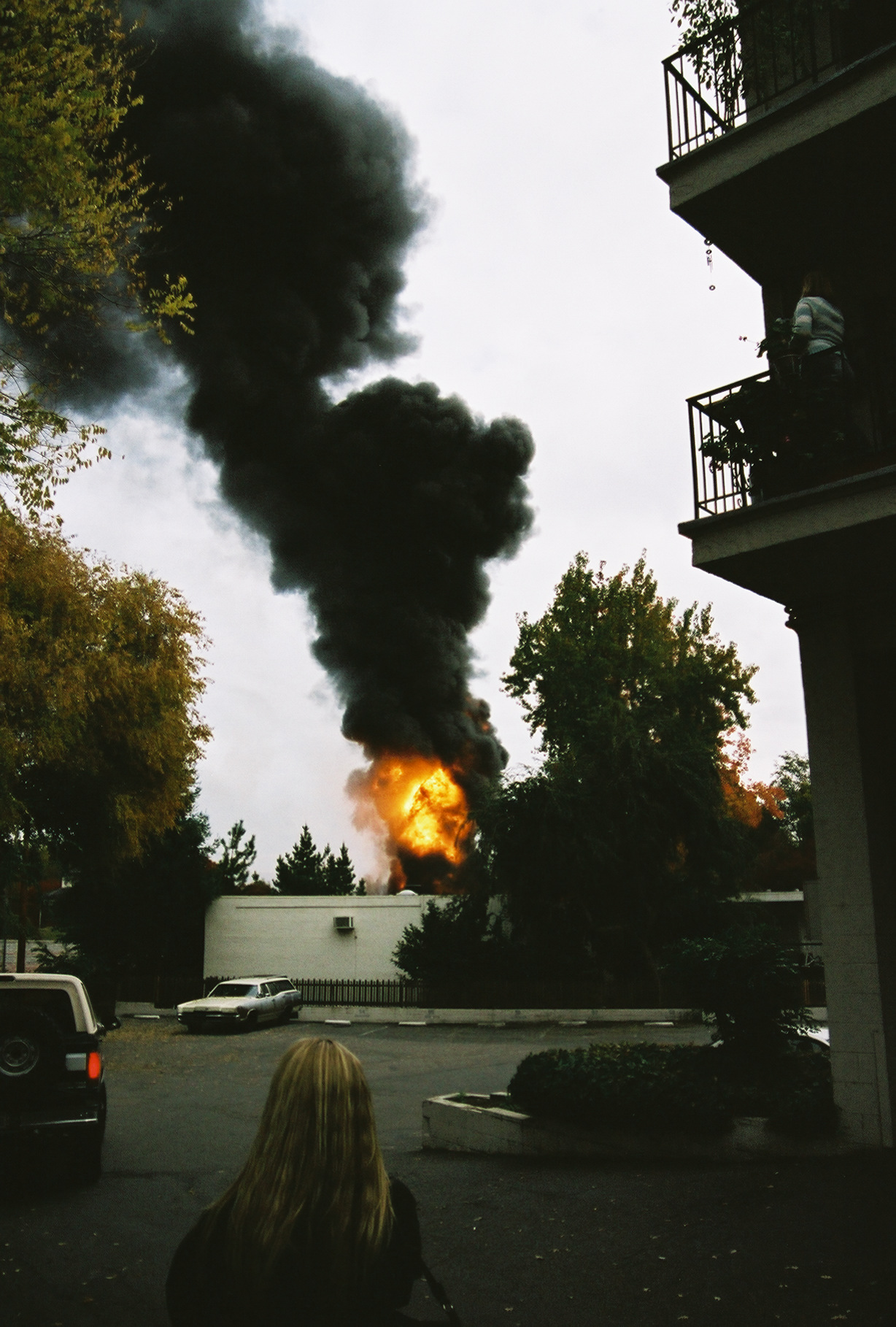
Pipeline fire wide angle

On November 9, 2004 in Walnut Creek, California, a petroleum pipeline carrying gasoline to San Jose owned and operated by Kinder Morgan Energy Partners (KMEP) was struck by a backhoe used by Mountain Cascade Inc. (MC), a contractor operating in the construction of a water pipeline for the East Bay Municipal Utility District (EBMUD). A massive gasoline spill was subsequently ignited, likely by the unaware welders of subcontractor Matamoros Welding working inside the steel water pipe, resulting in an explosive fireball that caused the deaths, by burns, of four workers and one supervisor and the severe injury of four others. Several nearby homes were ignited and one was partially destroyed. The fire burned for several hours before being brought under control by firefighters from departments throughout the central Contra Costa County region. CalOSHA (California Occupational Safety and Health Administration) cited KMGP Services Company (a subsidiary of Kinder Morgan) for failure to accurately stake-out the pipeline location. On Wednesday, July 7, 2005, the California State Fire Marshal assessed a fine of $500,000 upon KMGP, the largest ever levied within the state.

On September 22, 2007, KMGP was convicted on six felony charges related to the Walnut Creek Explosion. They were fined $15 million in connection with the case. Over $90 million in legal settlements were paid to the various victims of the explosion.

=== Burnaby crude oil spill ===
On July 24, 2007, a crude oil pipeline owned and operated by Kinder Morgan Energy Partners was ruptured by an excavator digging a storm sewer trench. The rupture was a few hundred meters from the final location at the Westridge Marine Terminal. It resulted in almost 2,000 barrels of crude oil being released into the residential neighborhood and the ocean near Inlet Drive in Burnaby, British Columbia. The crude oil sprayed 11 houses on Inlet Drive and caused an evacuation of the area, forcing 250 residents from their homes. Approximately 600 barrels of the oil flowed into Burrard Inlet, the resulting cleanup costing more than $15 million. The cleanup operation ultimately recovered 1,800 barrels of oil from the Inlet and coastline.

The Transportation Safety Board released a report on the incident in 2009, which concluded that the pipe, which was 610 mm in diameter, was struck and punctured by a contractor’s excavator bucket during excavation of a trench for a new storm sewer line along Inlet Drive in Burnaby. On October 3, 2011, three companies—two contractors and Kinder Morgan—each entered guilty pleas to a 21-count indictment in Provincial Court. The Crown sought a sentence of a $1,000 fine and a $149,000 contribution to the Habitat Conservation Trust Foundation, which works to protect B.C.'s fish, wildlife and habitats. Kinder Morgan was also asked to contribute $100,000 to an educational and training program.

=== Burnaby Mountain oil spill ===
On May 6, 2009, a contractor discovered that oil was leaking from one of the tanks Kinder Morgan's Burnaby Mountain terminal. In total, almost 1,700 barrels of crude oil were spilled. Fire and HazMat teams were called to the scene and contained the spill.

=== Abbotsford oil spill ===
On January 24, 2012, an oil spill was discovered at Kinder Morgan's Sumas terminal in Abbotsford. Local residents began reporting a strong gas-like smell coming from the area as early as 4:30 a.m. The spill was reported to be limited to a "containment area."
