= Slovakia–Ukraine relations =

- Slovakia: Ukraine

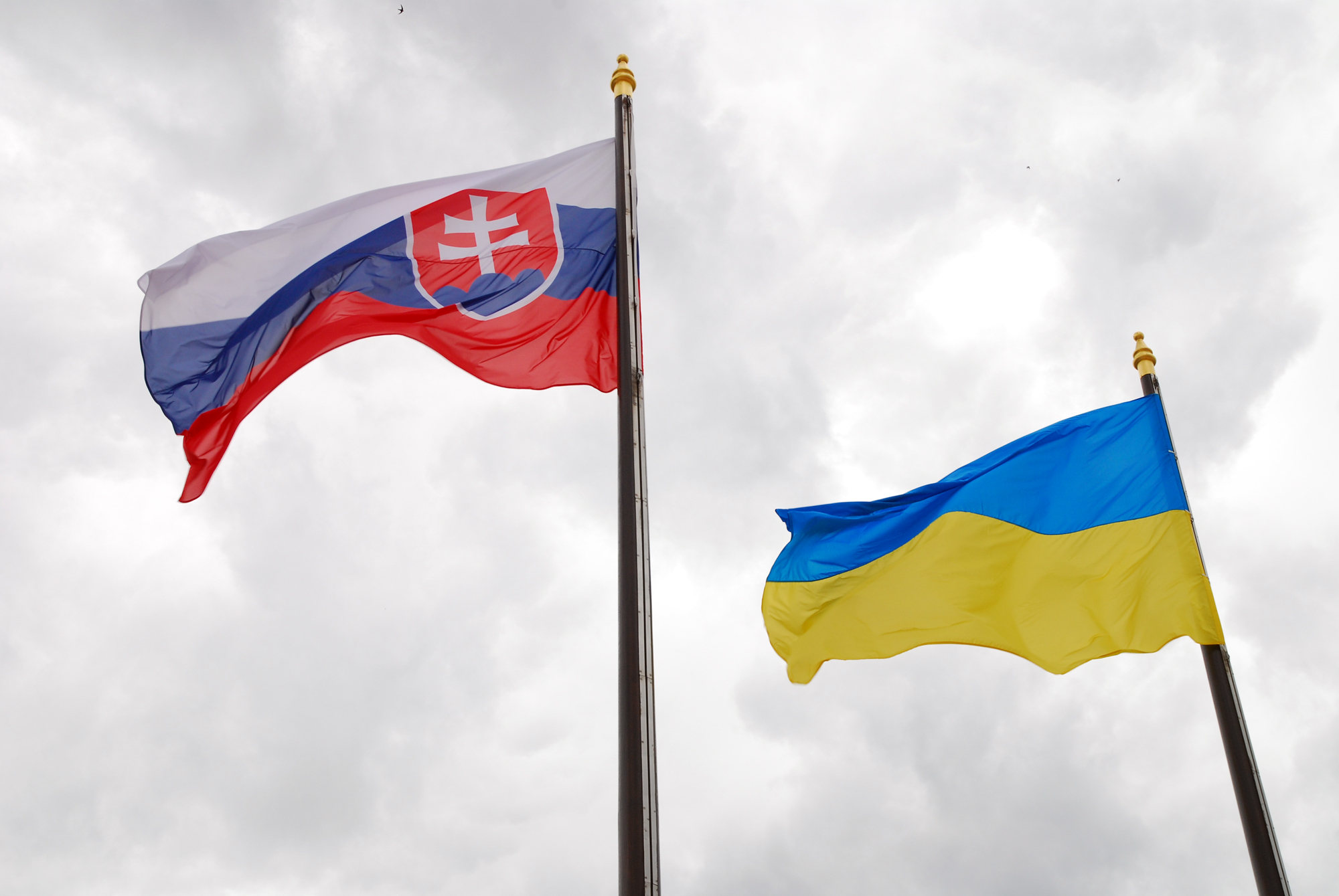
Slovak and Ukrainian flags

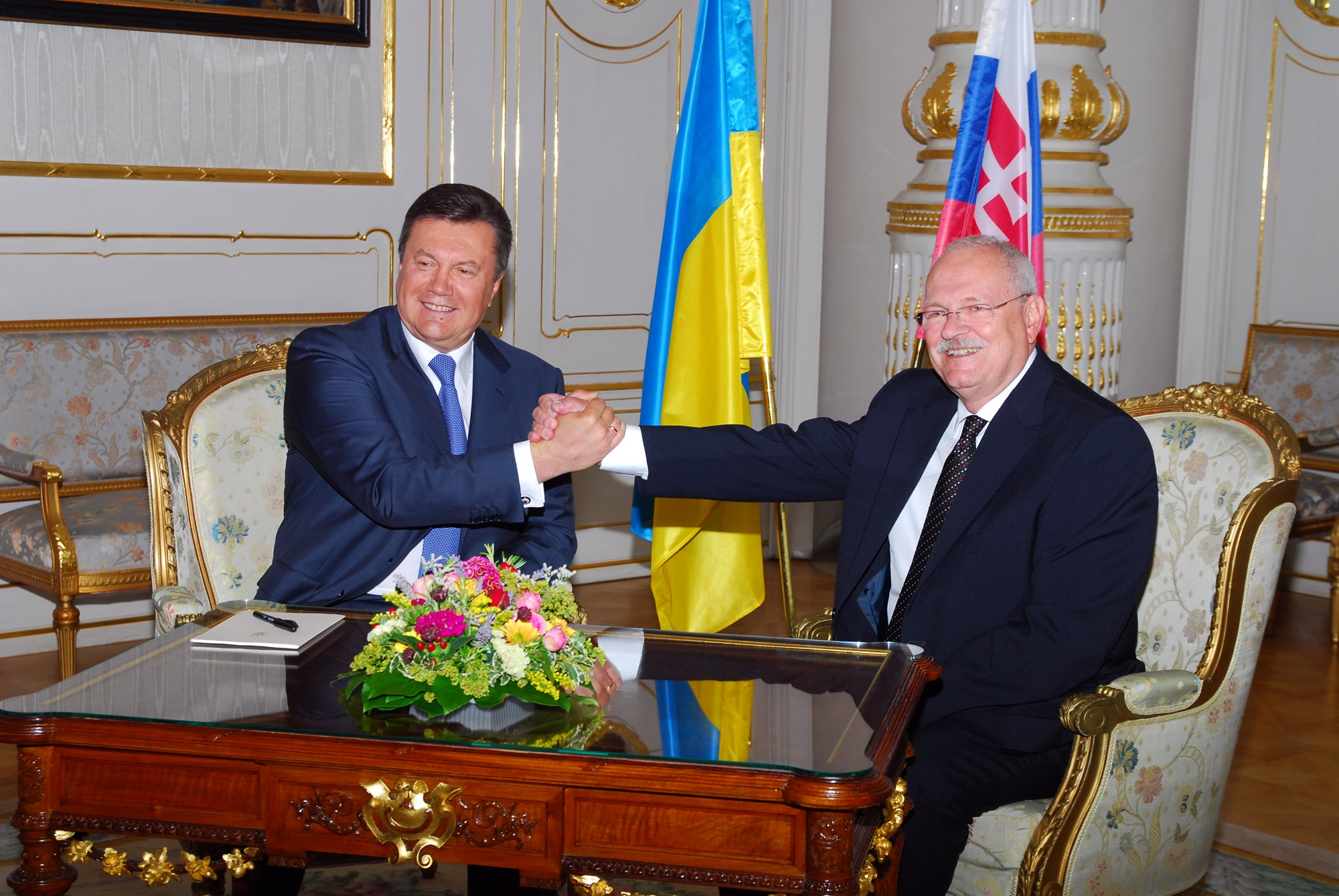
Former Presidents Viktor Yanukovych of Ukraine and Ivan Gašparovič of Slovakia in 2011

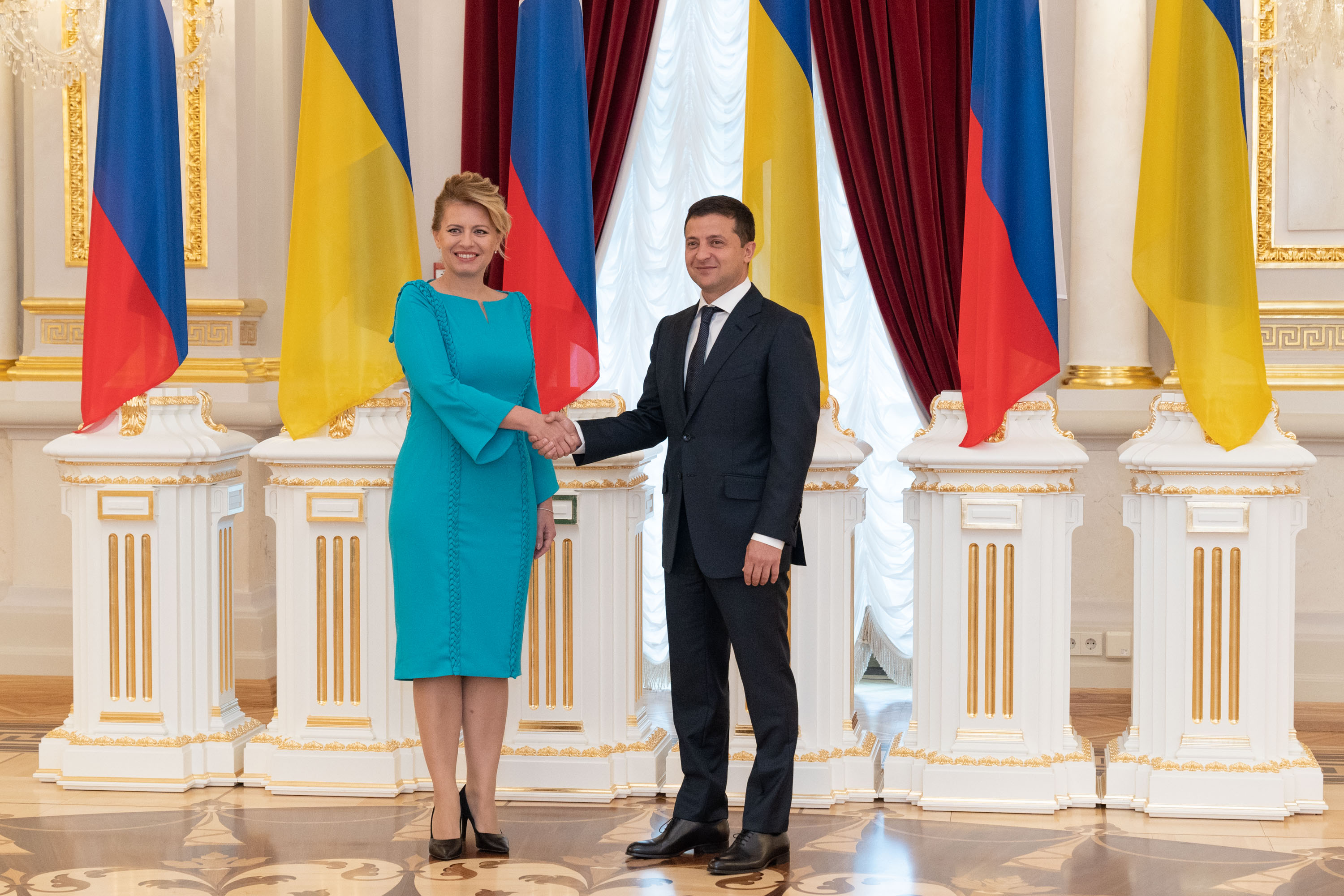
Former President Zuzana Čaputová of Slovakia and President Volodymyr Zelenskyy of Ukraine in 2019

Slovakia–Ukraine relations are the foreign relations between Slovakia and Ukraine. Both countries established diplomatic relations on 1 January 1993. Slovakia has an embassy in Kyiv, a general consulate in Uzhhorod, and two honorary consulates (in Donetsk and Uzhhorod). Ukraine has an embassy in Bratislava and a general consulate in Prešov.

The countries share 97 km of common border. There are between 40,000 and 100,000 people of Ukrainian descent living in Slovakia. Slovakia is a European Union member and Ukraine is a European Union candidate. Both countries are full members of the Council of Europe.

== History ==
During the Interwar era the Ukrainian oblast Zakarpattia was part of Czechoslovakia, before being ceded to Hungary. In 1993, during an official visit to Ukraine, the first president of independent Slovakia Michal Kováč signed an agreement on establishing constructive relations between the two countries. Multiple visits have subsequently been made from Slovakia to Ukraine from 2000 to present. In March 2022, the Slovak embassy in Kyiv temporarily suspended its work due to the Russian invasion of Ukraine. The embassy resumed its work on 12 April 2022.

=== 2020s ===
In April 2023, Slovakia banned the import of grain from Ukraine, following similar decisions made by Poland and Hungary.

Ukraine's Uzhhorod Airport is located near the Slovak-Ukraine border, requiring the potential use of Slovak airspace by planes landing or taking off at the airport.

On 25 October 2023, Robert Fico became the Prime Minister of Slovakia.

Fico is widely seen as pro-Russian, and his government has stopped militarily supporting Ukraine, saying he "will not send one bullet" to Ukraine. Fico has been opposing sanctions against Russia, with his standpoint on Ukraine being compared to that of Viktor Orbán.

In an RTVS interview, Fico questioned Ukraine's sovereignty and independence, claiming that Ukraine is just a US puppet, sparking outrage in both Slovakia and Ukraine. He has also stated that Slovakia will veto Ukraine's NATO membership, and has pushed for a peace deal, even if Ukraine suffers territorial losses. His words regarding Ukraine have been described as "heartless", "vulgar" and "disgraceful".

Upon taking office, Fico officially ended Slovakia's arms supplies to Ukraine. However, he has since taken a somewhat different line on Ukraine in office than during his election campaign. During a meeting with Ukrainian Prime Minister Denys Shmyhal in January 2024, Fico promised not to block private Slovak arms companies from selling to Ukraine, not to block EU financial support for Ukraine, and to support the accession of Ukraine to the European Union. He described Slovakia's political differences with Ukraine as "minor" and claimed to support Ukraine's sovereignty and territorial integrity.

On 29 July 2024, Prime Minister Robert Fico threatened to suspend Slovakia's diesel exports to Ukraine if the Ukrainian government continues to suspend pipeline oil transport from Russian oil company Lukoil, which Slovakia claims is causing a national energy crisis.

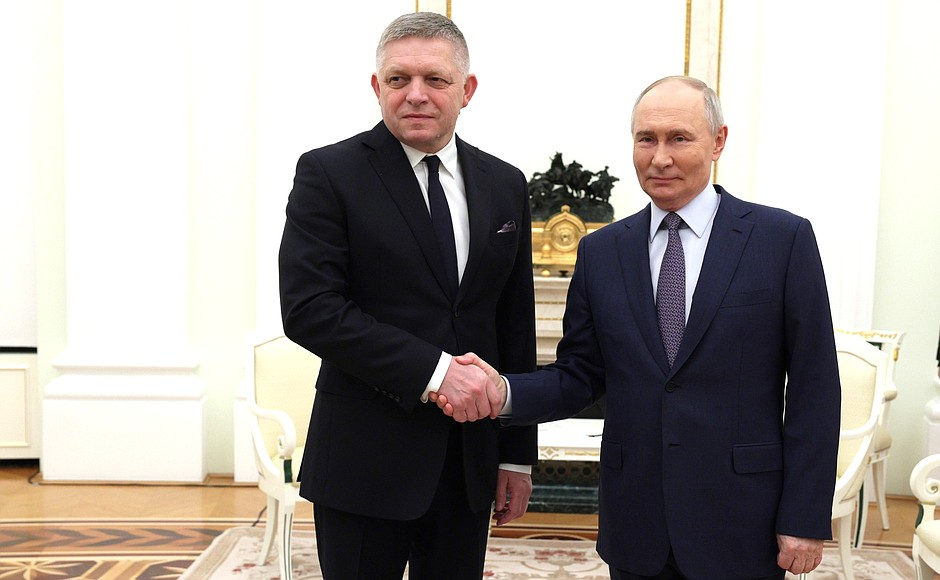
Fico meeting Russian president Vladimir Putin in Moscow, 22 December 2024

Fico met with Russian president Vladimir Putin in December 2024 in Moscow to discuss primarily the transfer of Russian gas to Slovakia. He became the third Western leader to do so since the war started.

In 2025 February, The Slovak National Party criticised Fico for his support for United Nations General Assembly Resolution ES-11/7, suggesting that Slovakia should have opposed the resolution in line with Hungary's position.

On 5 September 2025, Fico met with Ukrainian President Volodymyr Zelenskyy in Uzhhorod, Ukraine. During the meeting, Fico voiced support for Ukraine's accession to the EU.

On 18 February 2026, Slovakia suspended exports of diesel fuel to Ukraine during the 2026 Slovak–Ukraine oil dispute.

On 23 February 2026, Slovakia halts exports of emergency electricity supplies to Ukraine during the 2026 Slovak–Ukraine oil dispute.

During the 2026 Slovak–Ukraine oil dispute, Fico explicitly threatened that Slovakia would withdraw its support for Ukraine's accession to the European Union if the oil flow through the Druzhba pipeline was not immediately restored.

== See also ==
- Foreign relations of Slovakia
- Foreign relations of Ukraine
- Slovaks in Ukraine
- Ukrainians in Slovakia
- Russia–Ukraine gas disputes
- 2025 Slovak–Ukraine gas dispute
- 2026 Druzhba pipeline dispute
- Ukraine–European Union relations
  - Accession of Ukraine to the European Union
