= 2026 Druzhba pipeline dispute =

2026 diplomatic and energy crisis

- Part of the Russo-Ukrainian war (2022–present)
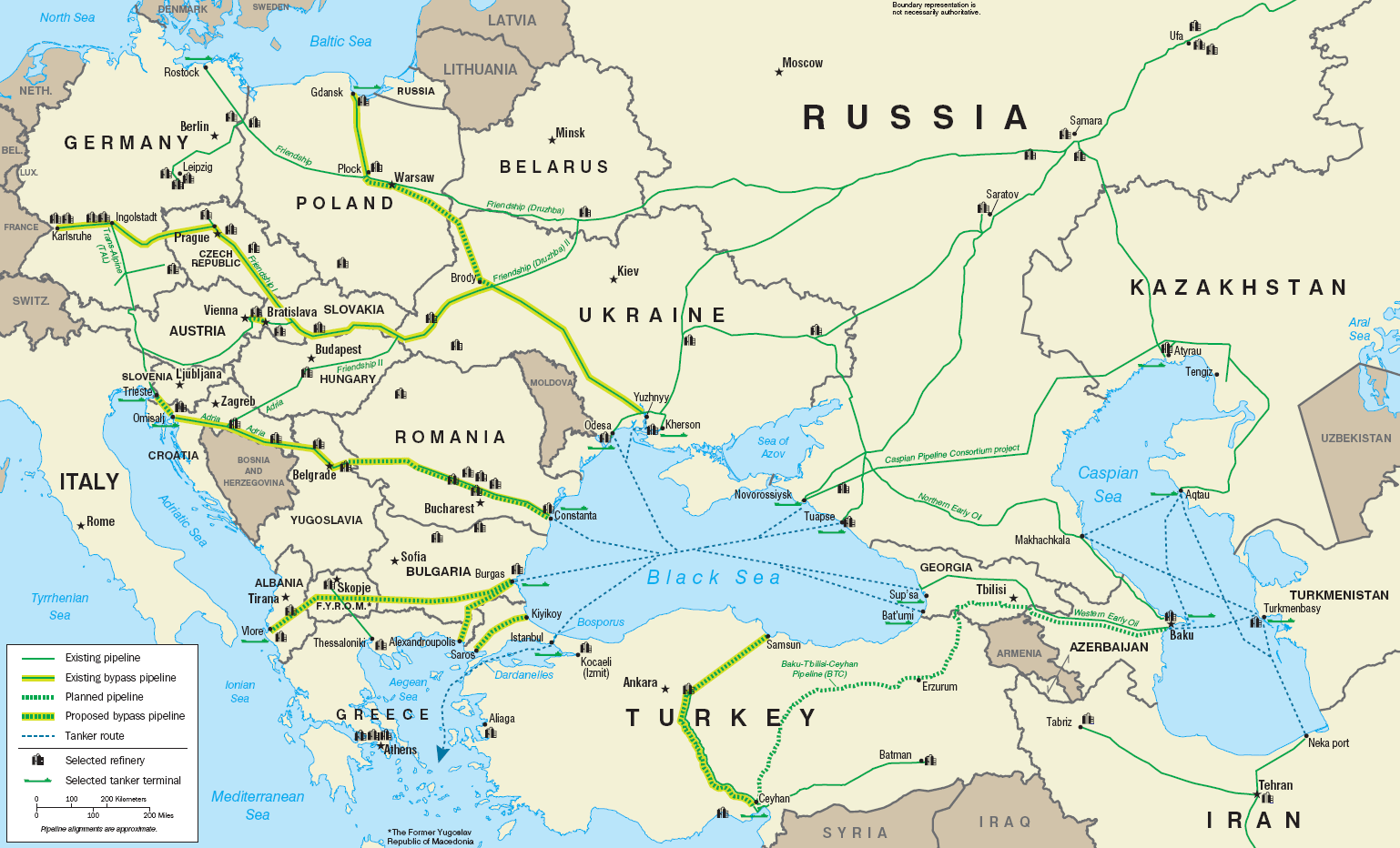
- Oil pipelines from Russia to Europe.
- Date: 27 January 2026 – 23 April 2026 (2 months, 3 weeks and 6 days)
- Location: Slovakia, Hungary and Ukraine
- Caused by: Disruption of the Druzhba pipeline by Ukraine following Russian drone strikes
- Result: Long-term degradation of diplomatic trust and bilateral relations between the Slovak and Ukrainian governments; Slovakia halts emergency electricity supplies to Ukraine; Slovakia and Hungary suspend diesel fuel exports to Ukraine; Permanent expansion of the Adria Pipeline capacity to ensure Slovakia is never 100% dependent on Druzhba again; The state of emergency measures in Slovakia; Millions of euros spent by Slovakia to replenish strategic reserves that were drained during the three-month halt

Parties
Slovakia; Hungary; Russia	Ukraine; Croatia

Lead figures
Robert Fico Viktor Orbán Vladimir Putin	Volodymyr Zelenskyy Andrej Plenković

The 2026 Druzhba pipeline dispute was a major diplomatic and energy crisis between Hungary, Slovakia and Ukraine that escalated in February 2026. It occurred precisely one year after the 2025 Slovak–Ukraine gas dispute, which was triggered by the expiration of the Russia–Ukraine gas transit contract. The 2026 conflict centers on the total cessation of Russian crude oil transit through the southern leg of the Druzhba pipeline, a vital energy artery for Slovakia and Hungary, due to a Russian drone strike on January 27, 2026, that severely damaged pipeline infrastructure near the Brody oil hub in western Ukraine.

While both Slovakia and Hungary were affected, the situation was more critical for Slovakia, because it is almost entirely dependent on its single refinery, Slovnaft, which is specifically configured for Russian crude, unlike Hungary, which has multiple refining facilities with significantly larger storage capacities. Slovakia has declared a national energy state of emergency due to its more limited infrastructure and immediate supply vulnerabilities.

The dispute has led to a significant breakdown in bilateral relations, characterized by unprecedented retaliatory measures from Slovakia, including the suspension of diesel fuel exports and the termination of emergency electricity supplies to Ukraine during a critical winter period. Slovak Prime Minister Robert Fico has accused Ukrainian President Volodymyr Zelenskyy of lying, asserting that the Druzhba oil pipeline is fully functional and that Zelenskyy is intentionally blocking transit for political leverage.

Following the closure of the land route, Hungary and Slovakia turned to Croatia's Adria pipeline as their primary alternative for oil supplies. This transition has led to further diplomatic friction, as both nations have filed formal complaints with the European Commission, claiming that despite offering its pipelines as a "helpful" alternative, Croatia is abusing its monopoly to charge fees three times higher than the European average.

The oil dispute concluded on April 23 after repairs to the Druzhba pipeline restored crude flows to Slovakia, leading to the immediate unblocking of a €90 billion EU aid package for Ukraine and the approval of the 20th package of sanctions against Russia. Prime Minister Robert Fico welcomed the resumption as a "fantastic message" for energy security but alleged the crisis was a geopolitical tool, noting that diplomatic trust between Bratislava and Kyiv remained severely damaged.

== Background ==
Following the expiration of the Russia–Ukraine gas transit contract on January 1, 2025, Slovakia had already experienced significant economic strain. Tensions intensified on January 27, 2026, when oil flows through the southern leg of the Druzhba pipeline, which supplies Slovakia and Hungary, were halted.

Ukraine attributed the disruption to a Russian drone strike that damaged pipeline infrastructure near the Brody oil hub in western Ukraine.

On January 29, 2026, Ukrainian Foreign Minister Andrii Sybiha posted photos to social media showing the extensive damage and ongoing fires at the Brody oil hub following the Russian drone strike two days earlier. In his statement, Sybiha officially attributed the disruption to Russian aggression and cited "force majeure" to international partners, explaining that the destruction of high-pressure pumps and control systems made the continued transit of oil to Slovakia and Hungary physically impossible.

Despite the total cessation of oil transit through the Druzhba pipeline on January 27, 2026, the Slovak government maintained public silence for over two weeks, leaving the population unaware of the disruption. The outage was only brought to light on February 12 by external reports and Ukrainian officials, rather than an official announcement from Bratislava. Slovak Prime Minister Robert Fico did not formally address the crisis until February 18. Fico defended this silence by stating that the government "did not want to spread panic" among the population. He argued that the situation was being managed internally with Slovnaft and that the public was not in immediate danger of a fuel shortage.

Ukrainian diplomats have informed the European Commission that while repair work is underway, the "uninterrupted and stable functioning" of the system is impossible as long as Russian attacks continue. To mitigate the crisis, Ukraine has formally proposed the use of the Odesa–Brody pipeline as a temporary alternative to transport non-Russian crude or rerouted supplies to Slovak and Hungarian refineries.

=== Alternative logistics ===
On February 16, in an effort to bypass the disruption of the Druzhba pipeline, the governments of Hungary and Slovakia have formally requested that Croatia facilitate the transit of Russian crude oil via the Adria pipeline (also known as the JANAF pipeline). Hungarian Foreign Minister Péter Szijjártó and Slovak officials argued that their current EU sanctions exemptions allow for the import of Russian oil by sea if land-based pipeline deliveries are interrupted.

However, this proposal has faced significant resistance from the Croatian government, which has balked at allowing Russian-origin crude to enter its infrastructure, despite expressing a willingness to help with non-Russian alternatives. Furthermore, Fico has noted that utilizing the Adria route would be commercially disadvantageous, as transit fees in Croatia are estimated to be more than five times higher than those previously paid for the Druzhba pipeline.

Croatian Minister of Economy Ante Šušnjar stated: "The Adria pipeline is ready, so no EU country has any technical justification to stay tied to Russian oil. A barrel bought from Russia may appear cheaper to some countries, but helps fund war and attacks on the Ukrainian people. It's time to end this war-time speculation".

=== State of emergency ===
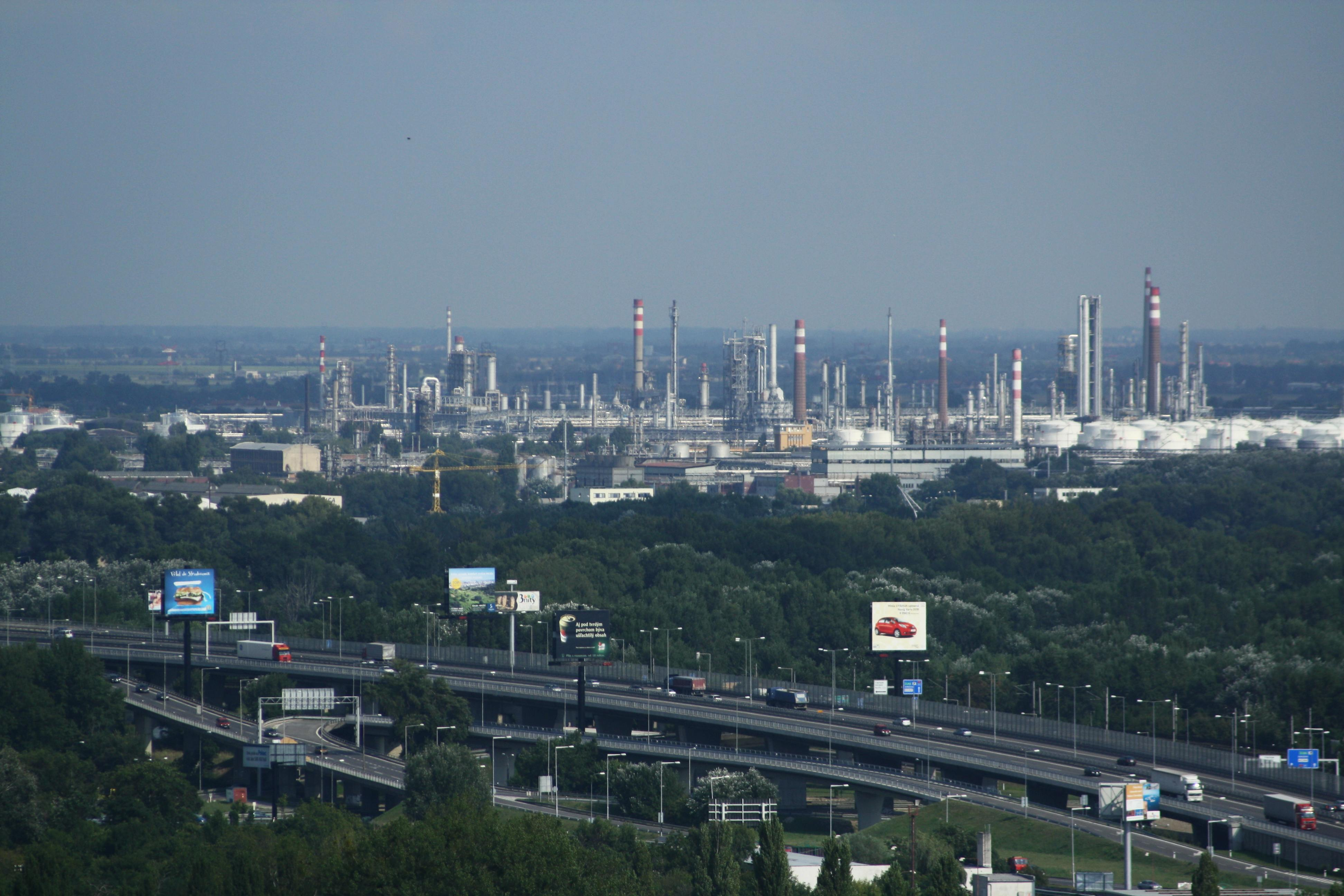
The Slovnaft refinery in Bratislava, focal point of the state of emergency declared by the Slovak government on February 18, 2026.

On February 18, the Slovak government declared a national state of emergency in the oil sector, the first in the country's history. To maintain the operations of the Slovnaft refinery and ensure domestic fuel stability, Robert Fico authorized the release of up to 250,000 tonnes of crude oil from the state's strategic material reserves. This measure was designed to cover approximately one month of refinery operations while the government negotiated alternative supply routes through Croatia and the Czech Republic.

In the same day, Fico publicly challenged Ukraine's claims of infrastructure damage, citing Slovak intelligence reports that allegedly show the Brody oil hub has already been repaired and is "technically ready" for transit. Based on this information, Fico accused President Volodymyr Zelenskyy of using the disruption as a tool for "political blackmail" and "playing games" to pressure Slovakia into changing its foreign policy regarding the Russo-Ukrainian War.

Fico argued that it was "unacceptable" for Slovakia to provide extensive humanitarian and energy aid while Ukraine's decisions caused economic damage to Slovakia, estimated by the Prime Minister at €500 million annually.

== Dispute ==
=== Fuel export suspension ===
On February 18, 2026, in a coordinated response to the transit disruption, the governments of Slovakia and Hungary officially suspended all diesel fuel exports to Ukraine, a move that significantly intensified the energy pressure on Kyiv during a critical winter period.

Robert Fico defended this escalation by arguing that it was no longer sustainable or justifiable for Slovakia to continue supplying critical refined petroleum products and humanitarian energy assistance while its own national energy security and economic interests were being directly compromised by Ukrainian transit decisions. He characterized the situation as a fundamental breach of reciprocity, asserting that Slovakia could not be expected to bolster Ukraine's infrastructure and military logistics with fuel exports while Bratislava's primary source of crude oil remained blocked by Ukrainian authorities. This suspension was particularly impactful as the Slovnaft refinery in Bratislava had previously been a primary supplier of diesel for Ukraine's agricultural and defense sectors.

=== EU accession support withdrawal ===
In addition to energy-based retaliatory measures, the Slovak government significantly escalated the diplomatic stakes of the conflict. Fico explicitly threatened that Slovakia would withdraw its support for Ukraine's accession to the European Union if the oil flow through the Druzhba pipeline was not immediately restored.

While Hungarian Prime Minister Viktor Orbán has consistently opposed Ukraine's EU membership on ideological and economic grounds, the threat to block EU membership marks a notable policy shift for Fico, who historically voiced support for Ukraine's European ambitions.

=== EU loan to Ukraine ===
On February 20, 2026, Hungary announced it would block a €90 billion EU loan to Ukraine until the resumption of oil supplies to the country via the Druzhba pipeline.

=== Termination of electricity supplies ===
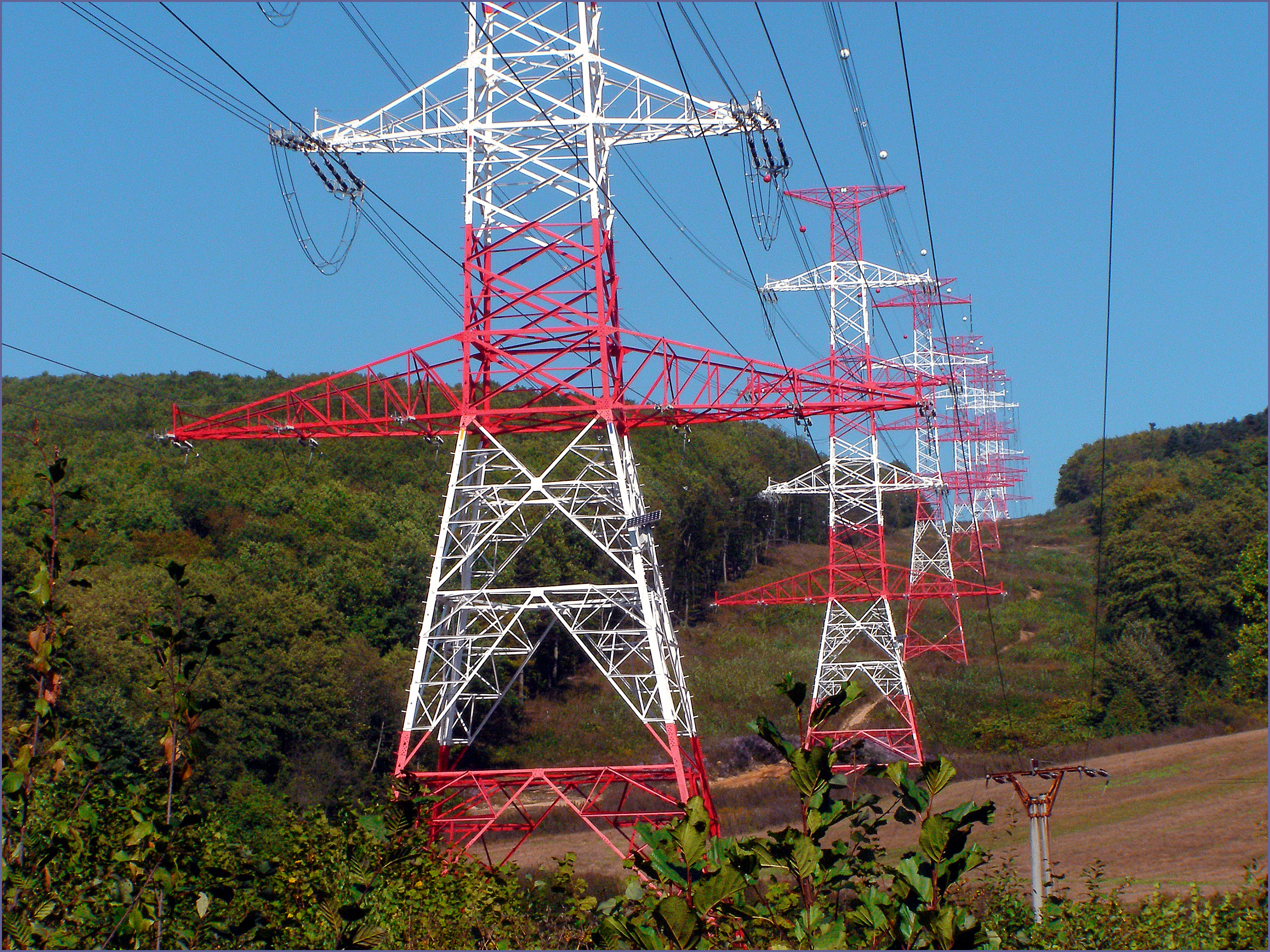
A high-voltage transmission line operated by SEPS at the east of Slovakia.

On February 21, Robert Fico escalated the energy standoff by issuing a direct ultimatum to President Volodymyr Zelenskyy via social media. He declared that if oil transit through the Druzhba pipeline was not restored by Monday, February 23, he would instruct the state grid operator to terminate all emergency electricity assistance.

The Ukrainian Ministry of Foreign Affairs officially condemned the actions of Bratislava as "unacceptable energy blackmail," asserting that the government of Slovakia was issuing irresponsible ultimatums during a critical winter period. "Ultimatums should be sent to the Kremlin, and certainly not to Kyiv", the ministry said, maintaining that the disruption of the Druzhba pipeline was a direct result of Russian aggression rather than Ukrainian policy. Kyiv argued that such retaliatory measures from Bratislava only serve to undermine European solidarity and play into the hands of the aggressor.

On February 22, Fico released a video statement on social media announcing that he would request the state-owned grid operator Slovenská elektrizačná prenosová sústava (SEPS) to stop emergency electricity deliveries. He stated, "If the (Ukrainian) President tells us we should buy gas and oil elsewhere than in Russia, even if it is harder and more expensive... we have the right to respond".

On February 23, Fico conducted a high-profile visit to the headquarters of SEPS accompanied by Finance Minister Ladislav Kamenický. During this meeting, Fico formally requested the immediate termination of emergency electricity assistance to Ukraine.

In clarifying the nature of this aid, Fico emphasized that Slovakia does not provide a constant flow of power, but rather "emergency assistance" intended to stabilize the Ukrainian grid and facilitate a "system restart" during critical blackouts.

=== 20th sanctions package ===
On February 23, Slovakia joined Hungary in blocking the European Union's 20th sanctions package against Russia, preventing its adoption ahead of the fourth anniversary of the full-scale invasion of Ukraine. Fico specifically linked his opposition to the suspension of oil transit through the Druzhba pipeline, characterizing the situation as a deliberate provocation by Ukraine.

EU High Representative Kaja Kallas expressed deep regret over the deadlock, describing it as a "setback and message we didn't want to send" on such a somber anniversary. Kallas emphasized that the vetoes undermine the "principle of sincere cooperation" enshrined in EU treaties and criticized the use of unrelated energy disputes to block support for Ukraine.

== Adria pipeline ==
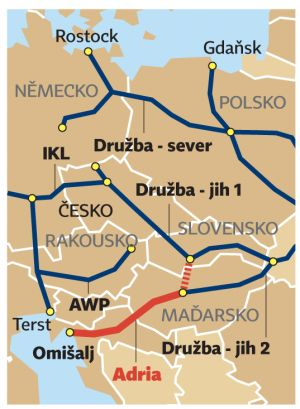
Adria oil pipeline

Zelenskyy revealed that Croatia had officially offered Hungary and Slovakia the necessary capacity to replace all Russian oil imports, but that Viktor Orbán had refused. Zelenskyy stated that the refusal proves the dispute is not about energy security, but rather a political preference, saying, "They don't want to use the Croatian route because it’s not Russian oil. They want to pay Russia." He emphasized that by rejecting this European alternative, Hungary and Slovakia are choosing to maintain a financial lifeline to Moscow despite the technical risks to the Druzhba pipeline.

Croatian Prime Minister Andrej Plenković offered the Adria pipeline as a cheaper and more reliable alternative, claiming its transit fees would be three times lower than those of the Druzhba route.

On March 4, 2026, the MOL Group (parent company of Slovnaft), acting on behalf of its Hungarian and Slovak subsidiaries including Slovnaft, filed a formal complaint with the European Commission’s Directorate-General for Competition. The filing officially rejects Croatia's terms for using the Adria pipeline, accusing the Croatian operator, JANAF, of abusing its dominant market position to engage in "unjustified pricing and negotiation practices".

MOL argues that JANAF is exploiting the current energy crisis, to charge transit fees that are actually three to four times higher than fair market benchmarks, such as those of the TAL pipeline serving Austria and Germany. Beyond the financial cost, the complaint alleges that Croatia is engaging in a "refusal of supply" by intentionally delaying the acceptance of legally permitted seaborne Russian oil shipments, citing unnecessary "legal reviews" as a delay tactic that directly endangers the energy security of Central Europe.

In addition to these claims, MOL and Slovnaft have characterized the situation as a "stalemate" where Brussels has theoretically permitted the import of seaborne Russian oil due to the Druzhba pipeline outage, but Croatia continues to block it due to its interpretation of EU and U.S. (OFAC) sanctions. While EU sanctions include an exemption allowing landlocked countries to import Russian crude by sea if their primary pipeline route is disrupted, JANAF has reportedly demanded that MOL obtain specific, separate permits from both the EU and the U.S. Office of Foreign Assets Control for each shipment. MOL has rejected this demand as "unrealistic" and an "unjustified bureaucratic obstacle," arguing that no such individual permits are required under existing law as long as the involved entities are not on sanctions lists.

The Croatian operator JANAF issued a statement asserting that oil supplies for Hungary and Slovakia are fully secured and under no threat, emphasizing that they have already transported significant quantities of non-sanctioned oil for MOL in recent weeks.

== Further developments ==
=== February 2026 ===
On the night of February 22–23, 2026, Ukrainian long-range drones operated by the Security Service of Ukraine (SBU) struck the Kaleykino oil pumping station in Russia's Republic of Tatarstan, located approximately 1,200 km (750 miles) from the border. The facility serves as a critical strategic hub for the Druzhba pipeline network, receiving and mixing crude oil from Western Siberia and the Volga region before exporting it to Central and Eastern Europe. Local residents reported six to seven powerful explosions followed by a large-scale fire that reportedly engulfed two storage tanks, each with a capacity of 50,000 cubic meters. Ukrainian officials characterized the operation as part of a systematic effort to reduce Russia's oil revenues, while the strike further intensified diplomatic tensions with Hungary and Slovakia, who are already facing supply disruptions via the pipeline.

On February 25, 2026, the European Commission's Oil Coordination Group confirmed that there is "no immediate risk" to the energy security of Slovakia or Hungary, noting that both countries have successfully begun utilizing their strategic reserves.

Croatia confirmed that the Adria pipeline (JANAF) is already actively transporting non-Russian crude to refineries in both nations, with additional seaborne shipments already in transit to Croatian terminals. While the Commission urged Ukraine to accelerate repairs on the Druzhba pipeline, it emphasized that the Croatian route remains a viable and high-capacity alternative to fully cover the needs of the affected member states.

In a social media post on February 27, 2026, Fico detailed a phone call with President Volodymyr Zelenskyy. Fico asserted Slovakia's "legitimate right" to Russian oil imports until 2027 under EU exemptions and highlighted the significant economic damage caused by the shutdown.

In response, Fico proposed an international inspection team—composed of EU and Member State experts—to verify the technical state of the pipeline, noting that Ukraine had previously blocked Slovak and EU diplomats from visiting the site. While Zelenskyy reportedly rejected the inspection due to security service objections, he invited the Slovak side to a broader bilateral meeting to discuss all aspects of Slovak-Ukrainian cooperation. Fico accepted the invitation but specified a preference for the meeting to take place within an EU member state. Fico concluded by stating he was left with the "unequivocal feeling" that Ukraine has no genuine interest in restoring the oil flow.

=== March 2026 ===
On March 2, 2026, Zelenskyy criticized the "purely pragmatic" stance of Robert Fico and Viktor Orbán, accusing them of ingratitude for ignoring the human cost of maintaining the Druzhba pipeline under fire. He revealed that Ukrainian workers were injured while repairing damage from Russian strikes, noting that neither leader expressed sympathy for the casualties.

On March 4, 2026, Fico accused Zelenskyy of "deliberate lies", he stated that his distrust of the Ukrainian leader is so absolute that "he doesn't even believe President Zelenskyy has a nose between his eyes". Fico claimed to possess satellite images confirming that the main transit route remains functional, despite Ukraine’s assertion that Russian strikes on January 27 caused debilitating internal damage. Zelenskyy argues that satellite views cannot show destroyed control panels or underground pipe damage, making them an insufficient tool for assessing the pipeline's true operational status.

On March 5, Zelenskyy escalated tensions with Viktor Orbán by suggesting he would give the Hungarian leader’s address to Ukrainian soldiers so they could "speak their own language" with him. These remarks were made in response to Orbán blocking a vital €90 billion EU loan for Ukraine, a move Budapest linked to disruptions in the Druzhba oil pipeline. The European Commission condemned Zelenskyy’s rhetoric as "unacceptable," emphasizing that no EU member state should be subject to threats.

Zelenskyy has said he would prefer not to repair the Druzhba oil pipeline, by saying "my position, which is shared with European leaders, is that I would not repair the pipeline".

On March 10, Fico met with European Commission President Ursula von der Leyen in Paris during the World Nuclear Forum to address the suspension of oil transit through the Druzhba pipeline. During the meeting, Fico presented satellite imagery which he claimed proved the pipeline remained technically functional despite Ukrainian reports of irreversible damage from Russian drone strikes. According to Fico, both parties reached a consensus that restoring the flow of Russian crude is a regional priority, with the European Commission reportedly offering to provide both technical expertise and direct financing for any necessary repairs. Additionally, the leaders discussed the formation of an independent international inspection team to verify the status of the infrastructure in Ukraine as a step toward de-escalating the crisis.

On March 11, during a government session attended by President Peter Pellegrini, Fico announced that the state would release 250,000 tons of crude oil from its strategic reserves to the Slovnaft refinery. While the Slovak Constitution allows the President to attend and preside over government meetings at their discretion, such participation is highly unusual and typically reserved for moments of extreme national significance. Fico stated that this emergency loan is intended to maintain standard production for at least another month. The Prime Minister characterized the crisis as a double blow caused by President Zelenskyy’s decision to halt transit and the rising global oil prices linked to the Iran war. While Fico emphasized that Slovakia maintains a valid EU exemption to use Russian oil until 2027, he noted that Slovnaft is already securing alternative tanker deliveries to supplement the depleted state reserves.

On March 15, Zelenskyy issued a formal statement addressing the link between energy transit and military aid, explicitly labeling the pressure from European neighbors as "blackmail". He articulated his position by stating: "I will say it openly: I am against it. But when I am given the condition that Ukraine will not receive weapons, then, excuse me, I am powerless in this matter. I told our friends in Europe that this is called blackmail".

On March 18, the Slovak government approved a resolution allowing gas stations to charge higher prices for foreign-registered vehicles to combat "fuel tourism". The policy officially took effect at midnight on March 19, 2026, aiming to stabilize domestic supply after a surge of drivers from neighboring countries caused fuel shortages at border stations. While Slovak authorities framed the 30-day emergency regulation as a necessary step for national energy security, the measure immediately drew scrutiny for its potential violation of European Union non-discrimination laws.

The European Commission formally condemned the measure as "highly discriminatory". Commission spokesperson Ricardo Cardoso stated that while the EU understands the need to support citizens during an energy crisis, such unilateral actions violate EU non-discrimination laws and undermine the integrity of the single market. The Commission warned it would take "appropriate legal action" to ensure Slovak compliance with Union law.

During the EU summit in Brussels on March 19, Fico broke consensus by refusing to sign the European Council’s joint conclusions regarding Ukraine. Speaking from the summit, Fico criticized EU leadership and warned of "further measures" against Kyiv if it continued to "deliberately inflict economic damage" by obstructing the Druzhba pipeline. He accused President Volodymyr Zelenskyy of "illegitimate interference" in regional energy security and lambasted the European Union for failing to "persuade or force" Ukraine to restore oil flows.

On March 25, Hungarian Prime minister Viktor Orbán said Hungary will gradually suspend gas supplies to Ukraine until Russian oil transit through the Druzhba pipeline resumes, citing disruptions to deliveries crossing Ukraine.

On March 26, Branislav Gröhling, chairman of the opposition party Freedom and Solidarity (SaS), announced that the Slovak police had officially launched an investigation into Prime Minister Robert Fico for high treason. The investigation began after a criminal complaint was filed on February 24, 2026. With nearly 13,000 citizens signing it, this has been described as the largest criminal complaint in Slovak history. The allegations center on Fico’s decision to stop emergency electricity and diesel supplies to Ukraine, a move the opposition claims was coordinated with a foreign power to undermine Slovakia's security and state interests. Under Section 311 of the Slovak Criminal Code, high treason (vlastizrada) is defined as an intentional act committed by a Slovak citizen in coordination with a foreign power or a foreign agent to dismantle the country's constitutional system, sovereignty, or territorial integrity. It is considered the most serious crime against the Republic, as it involves the betrayal of the state's fundamental safety and independence.

=== April 2026 ===
On April 14, after the 2026 Hungarian parliamentary election, Ukraine's President Volodymyr Zelenskyy said the Druzhba pipeline will be repaired by the end of April.

On April 17, Slovak Foreign Minister Juraj Blanár announced that Slovakia would veto the European Union's 20th sanctions package against Russia unless it received a "clear, transparent, and verifiable" guarantee that the Druzhba oil pipeline would be reopened. Speaking to the Slovak Parliament’s European Affairs Committee, Blanár stated that the country has "no other tools" to pressure Zelensky and the European Commission to restart operations.

== Result ==
The oil dispute concluded on April 23, 2026, as crude oil flows through the southern branch of the Druzhba pipeline were officially restored. The crisis ended when Slovak officials confirmed that supply levels had returned to normal at the Budkovce pumping station.

This resolution resulted in the immediate unblocking of a €90 billion EU financial aid package for Ukraine and the unanimous approval of the 20th package of EU sanctions against Russia.

The standoff prompted Slovakia to permanently diversify its energy infrastructure by expanding the Adria pipeline and upgrading domestic refineries to process non-Russian crude. While the restoration of flows allowed for the resumption of Slovak electricity and diesel exports to Ukraine, the dispute resulted in a long-term degradation of diplomatic trust and bilateral relations between the two governments.

Slovak Prime Minister Robert Fico labeled the restoration of the Druzhba pipeline a "fantastic message for the energy security of Slovakia" and a success of his government's "sovereign foreign policy". He asserted that the prompt resumption of flow at 2:00 AM on April 23 was "clear confirmation" that the pipeline had not been physically damaged, alleging instead that the infrastructure and the oil itself had been used as "tools in a geopolitical battle". Fico credited the reopening to a combination of "sovereign pressure" from Bratislava and cooperation with the Hungarian government and the European Commission. While acknowledging that the resolution unblocked EU loans for Ukraine, he reiterated that Slovakia remained opposed to participating in those specific financial aid programs. Fico further remarked that trust between Bratislava and Kyiv remained "badly damaged".

Zelenskyy stated that Ukraine had fulfilled its technical obligations by completing repairs under difficult wartime conditions and expected the restoration to lead to the immediate release of the stalled EU financial support.

== Reactions ==
Following Prime Minister Robert Fico's official request to terminate emergency electricity assistance to Ukraine on February 23, 2026, a wave of domestic and international reactions highlighted the deep polarization over the decision.

=== Domestic ===
Slovak President Peter Pellegrini stated, that diplomatic negotiations should be given space as soon as possible regarding the energy supply issue. He emphasized that these talks are necessary to urgently resume the delivery of oil to Slovakia and electricity to Ukraine.

Fico's coalition partner Slovak National Party (SNS), led by Andrej Danko, fully supported the move, calling it a "clear and vigorous step" against Ukrainian "extortion".

Michal Šimečka, leader of the opposition party Progressive Slovakia (PS), described the move as an "unbelievable shame", particularly as it coincided with the anniversary of the Russian invasion. He argued that the move would damage Slovakia's reputation and that neighboring countries like Poland or Romania would likely compensate for the energy shortfall.

The opposition party Freedom and Solidarity filed a criminal complaint against the government for the suspension of emergency electricity. Representatives of the party characterized the decision as a "crime against humanity", arguing that cutting off energy supplies to a country at war is a violation of basic humanitarian principles.

=== International ===
Ukraine: On February 23, 2026, the Ukrainian national operator Ukrenergo stated that while they had not requested emergency assistance from Slovakia in several weeks, the unilateral termination of the agreement undermines regional energy solidarity. Kyiv maintains that the loss of Slovak emergency supplies will not immediately collapse the grid, but complicates technical stability during peak loads.

Russia: On February 26, 2026, Kremlin spokesperson Dmitry Peskov stated that Russia views the suspension of oil transit as "sabotage by the Kyiv regime". He praised the "absolutely clear and consistent positions" of Bratislava and Budapest in defending their national economic interests against Ukrainian actions.

Russian Foreign Ministry spokesperson Maria Zakharova criticized the European Union's response, calling the "inaction of Brussels" surprising given that the blockade "threatens the energy security of Hungary, Slovakia, and all of Europe".

Hungary: On February 22, 2026, Hungarian Foreign Minister Péter Szijjártó signaled a more cautious approach toward halting electricity supplies to Ukraine, stepping back from earlier threats of a total cutoff. He explained that since nearly half of Ukraine's electricity imports come from Hungary, stopping these exports would primarily cause suffering for the ethnic Hungarian community living in the Zakarpattia region. Szijjártó clarified that Budapest's dispute is specifically with the Ukrainian government and President Zelenskyy, not the Ukrainian people.

Czech Republic: Former Czech Prime Minister Petr Fiala issued a stinging rebuke of the Slovak government's decision. In a statement on February 23, Fiala described the cutting of electricity to a country at war as "criminal conduct". He argued that such a move crosses a moral line, stating that "to leave people in the dark and cold while they are defending themselves against an aggressor is not a legitimate tool of diplomacy, but an act of cruelty". Fiala further noted that this decision would lead to the total international isolation of the Fico government within the EU and NATO.

Czech politician Tomáš Zdechovský, who represents the Czech Republic in the European Parliament, strongly criticized the Slovak government's decision on social media, emphasizing that "true character reveals itself in times of crisis". He stated that Poland and Romania are prepared to intervene and replace the electricity supplies previously provided by Slovakia.

European Union: Brussels has officially rejected the claims by Fico and Orbán that the transit halt is a political maneuver by Kyiv. The Commission stated it relies on technical data showing the pipeline was damaged by Russian airstrikes and that repairs are being hampered by ongoing security risks.

European Commission President Ursula von der Leyen and Foreign Policy Chief Kaja Kallas have strongly criticized the linkage of the oil dispute to the €90 billion "Steel Porcupine" loan and the 20th sanctions package. Von der Leyen stated that the loan agreement "cannot be broken" and that the EU would deliver the funds to Ukraine "one way or the other," even if it requires bypass mechanisms to circumvent the Hungarian and Slovak vetoes.

== See also ==
- 2025 Slovakia–Ukraine gas dispute
- 2025 Moldovan energy crisis
- Slovak opposition to sanctions on Russia
- International sanctions during the Russian invasion of Ukraine
- International sanctions during the Russo-Ukrainian war
- European Union sanctions
