= Slovak opposition to sanctions on Russia =

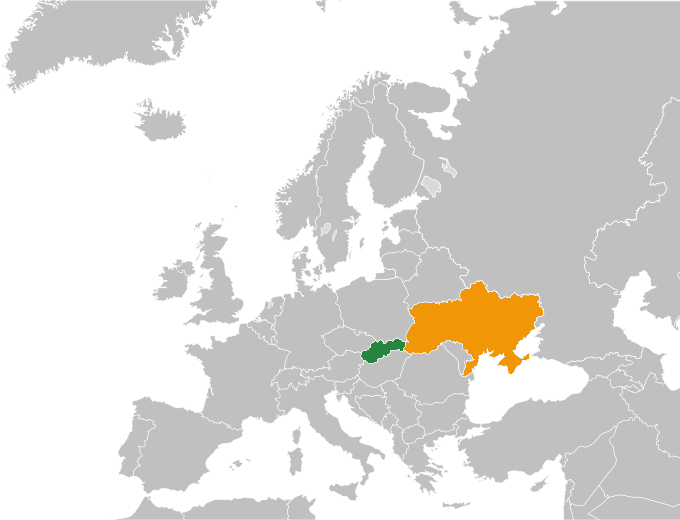
- Locations of Slovakia and Ukraine
- Date(s): 25 October 2023 – present
- Location: Slovakia, European Union
- Participants: Prime Minister Robert Fico; Government of Slovakia; Smer-SD, Hlas-SD, SNS; European Commission; Council of the European Union; Slovak opposition parties; PS, SaS, KDH, Slovakia Movement

The opposition to European Union sanctions on Russia in Slovakia is a prominent political and diplomatic issue, primarily driven by the policies of the governing coalition led by prime minister Robert Fico of the Direction – Social Democracy party. This stance contrasts with the majority position of EU member states and has made Slovakia a frequent outlier, often aligning with Hungary on this foreign policy matter.

Following the 2026 Hungarian parliamentary election, which resulted in the defeat of Viktor Orbán's Fidesz party by Péter Magyar's Tisza party, Slovakia has stood virtually isolated within the EU on this foreign policy matter.

Fico has repeatedly labeled the sanctions as "self-destructive" for both the EU and Slovakia, arguing that they have failed to achieve their goal of reversing Russian policy while causing disproportionate harm to the Slovak people.

== Background ==
The EU has implemented numerous, unprecedented sanctions packages against Russia since its 2022 invasion of Ukraine, building on measures in place since 2014. These restrictive measures target Russia's economy, with key focus areas including the financial sector (e.g., SWIFT exclusion for certain banks and asset freezes), energy (import bans on seaborne crude oil and refined petroleum products), and technology (export bans on dual-use and advanced tech items). Additionally, sanctions include individual asset freezes and travel bans on those deemed responsible for or supporting the aggression. The goal is to severely impair Russia's ability to finance its war.

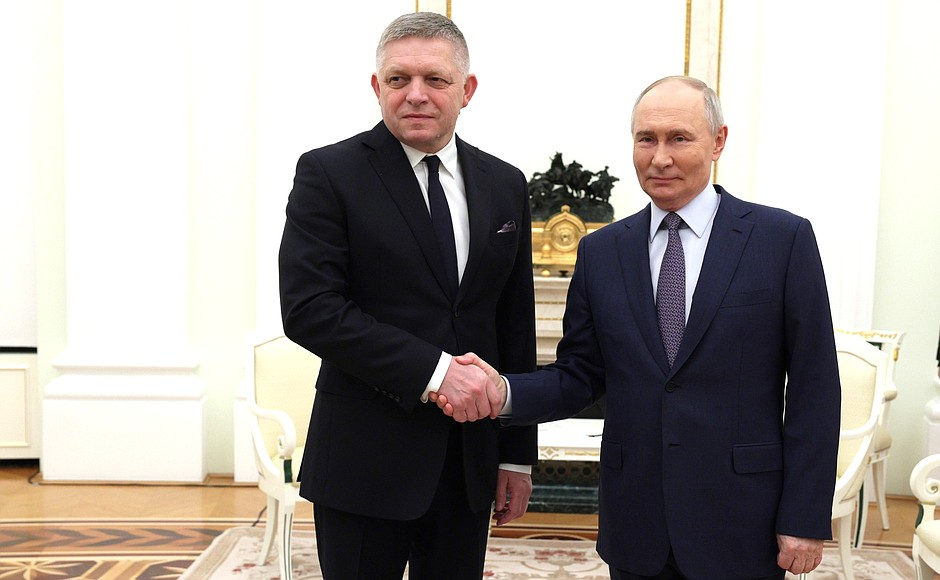
Fico meeting Russian president Vladimir Putin in the Moscow Kremlin, Russia, 22 December 2024

Slovakia's opposition to the sanctions primarily emerged following the 2023 parliamentary election, which brought Fico and his coalition—including Direction – Social Democracy, the center-left Voice – Social Democracy, and the far-right Slovak National Party, back to power. Fico, known for his long-standing pro-Russian views and frequent criticism of EU and NATO policies, has often openly challenged the efficacy and necessity of the sanctions. He has terminated military aid to Ukraine, called sanctions "demagogic and damaging," and frequently aligns with Hungary's Viktor Orbán in obstructing EU unity.

Opponents of sanctions argue that the measures have failed to achieve their intended goal of halting the war or significantly crippling the Russian economy, while simultaneously harming the EU and Slovak economy.

=== Political positioning ===
Direction – Social Democracy, led by prime minister Robert Fico is the main proponent of re-evaluating or blocking new sanctions. Their stated position often focuses on "evaluating the efficiency" of existing sanctions, arguing they harm the Slovak and broader European economies more than Russia's. Fico has repeatedly used Slovakia's veto power in the European Council to block or delay new sanctions packages.

Fico often frames his opposition as defending Slovak national economic interests and refusing to be a "punching bag" for EU decisions, playing into a sense of Euroscepticism or prioritizing national concerns over Brussels' agenda.

Fico has consistently called for a shift in EU policy from military aid and sanctions to peace negotiations and diplomacy to end the conflict, arguing that "peace" should be the "key word" of Slovak foreign policy. Fico has also criticized the EU's approach by saying, "If the EU spent as much energy on peace as it does on supporting the war in Ukraine, the war could have been over long ago," while rejecting the goal of seeking Russia's military defeat.

An ultranationalist coalition partner, the Slovak National Party, has publicly called for an end to anti-Russia sanctions and the restoration of trade relations with Moscow.

=== Economic concerns ===
Slovakia is highly dependent on the automotive industry, which has been affected by high energy prices and economic instability resulting, in part, from the sanctions regime and the shift away from Russian energy. Proponents of lifting sanctions argue that the EU must prioritize solutions for this sector.

Historically, Slovakia has been heavily reliant on Russian energy, particularly gas and oil. Though efforts have been made to diversify, this dependence is used as an argument against further energy-related sanctions, with a focus on mitigating domestic price increases.

Prior to Russia's full-scale invasion of Ukraine in February 2022, Slovakia was nearly 100% dependent on Russian gas imports, making it one of the most highly reliant countries in the European Union. Furthermore, it was extremely dependent on Russian crude oil, with imports delivered via the Druzhba pipeline consistently accounting for well over 90% of the feedstock processed at the country's sole refinery, Slovnaft. Slovakia was also 100% dependent on Russia for the supply of nuclear fuel for its power plants, which generate over 60% of the nation's electricity.

As of 2026, most of gas imports to Slovakia is from Russia via TurkStream pipeline. TurkStream connects Russia and Turkey, with gas flowing through the Balkans and Hungary before reaching Slovakia. Despite reducing its dependence on Russian oil, Slovakia continues to rely heavily on these imports. By 2023, the percentage of Russian oil in Slovakia's total imports had fallen to approximately 75%.

== Opposition to sanctions ==
The Slovak parliamentary delegation, led by Deputy Speakers of the National Council of the Slovak Republic Andrej Danko and Tibor Gašpar, meeting with Russian officials at the Federation Council in Moscow, 1 January 2025

Slovakia, as an EU member state, holds veto power over key foreign policy decisions, including the adoption of sanctions, which require unanimity among all 27 members. Fico has repeatedly leveraged this power to extract concessions or block further punitive measures against Russia, arguing they damage the Slovak economy.

In June 2025, the National Council of Slovakia passed a non-binding resolution instructing the government to oppose new anti-Russian sanctions in international forums, providing political justification for Fico's vetoes.

=== 18th sanctions package ===
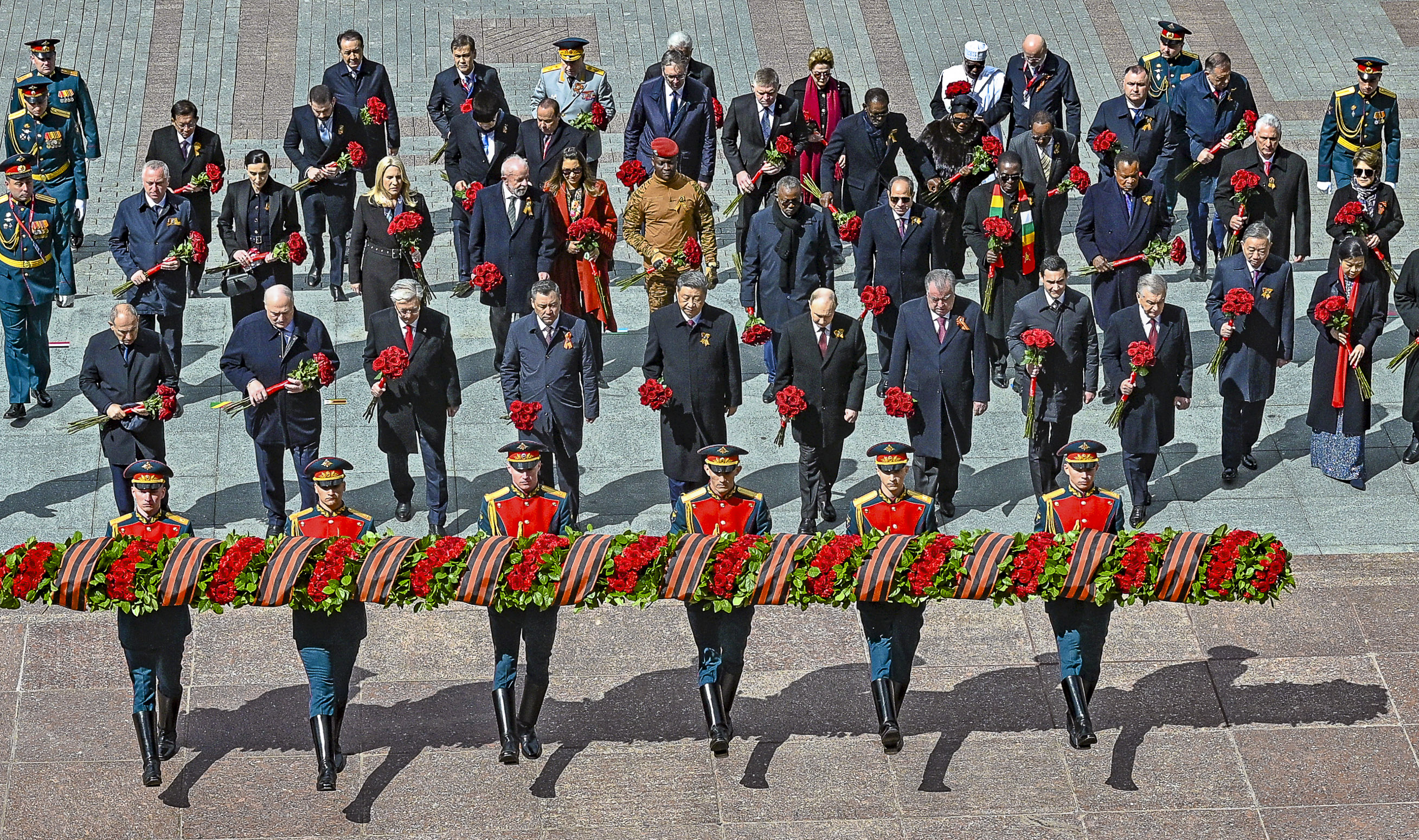
Fico (in the middle of the last row) was the only leader of an EU member state to attend the Russian Victory Day parade in Moscow, Russia, 9 May 2025

In July 2025, Fico initially blocked the 18th sanctions package against Russia for over six weeks, using the veto not to oppose the package's content directly, but to secure leverage on the separate, but related, issue of the EU's planned phase-out of Russian fossil fuels by 2028, which he publicly described as an "imbecilic proposal" due to the potential negative impact on Slovakia's energy security and economy. Slovakia, which has a long-term gas contract with Russia's Gazprom expiring in 2034, remains heavily reliant on Russian gas supplies. Fico had demanded a legal exemption from the 2028 phase-out or financial guarantees to offset potential losses from early termination of the Gazprom contract, which he warned could amount to billions of euros.

German Chancellor Friedrich Merz publicly rebuked Fico, urging him to "give up the resistance" for the sake of EU unity and warning that Slovakia and Hungary could face increasing pressure if they continue to obstruct common positions on Russia. Merz signaled a confrontational line towards the pro-Kremlin outliers, which Fico's government dismissed as "unacceptable" attempts to "punish" or "lecture" Slovakia.

Czech prime minister Petr Fiala sent a direct letter to Fico, urging him not to block the sanctions package, citing the close ties between the two nations and a shared responsibility to confront Russian aggression. Fico's party publicly rejected the Czech appeal, stating that "Slovakia will not automatically vote as needed by Brussels simply because the Czech prime minister wants us to".

EU officials and diplomats have consistently expressed deep unhappiness over the brinkmanship, with one European Green Party co-chair describing Fico's veto in July 2025 as "outright sabotage" and accusing him of acting as "Russia's Trojan horse within the European Council".

The United States has been a strong proponent of tougher European sanctions, particularly on Russia's energy revenues. While the United States does not directly intervene in the EU's voting mechanisms, Washington's persistent calls for the bloc to be "tougher on Russia and its enablers" have indirectly increased the pressure on sanctions-sceptical members like Slovakia and Hungary.

Ultimately, Fico lifted his veto on July 18, 2025, after receiving a "comfort letter" from European Commission President Ursula von der Leyen. This letter, while containing no concrete financial commitments, reportedly promised that if Slovakia faced an "unbearable" situation—such as severe price increases or supply shortages—a crisis procedure could be triggered to grant exemptions from EU policy. It also stipulated that EU legislation forcing an end to Russian gas imports would be considered a "force majeure" event, relieving Slovakia of liability in potential legal disputes with Gazprom.

=== 19th sanctions package ===
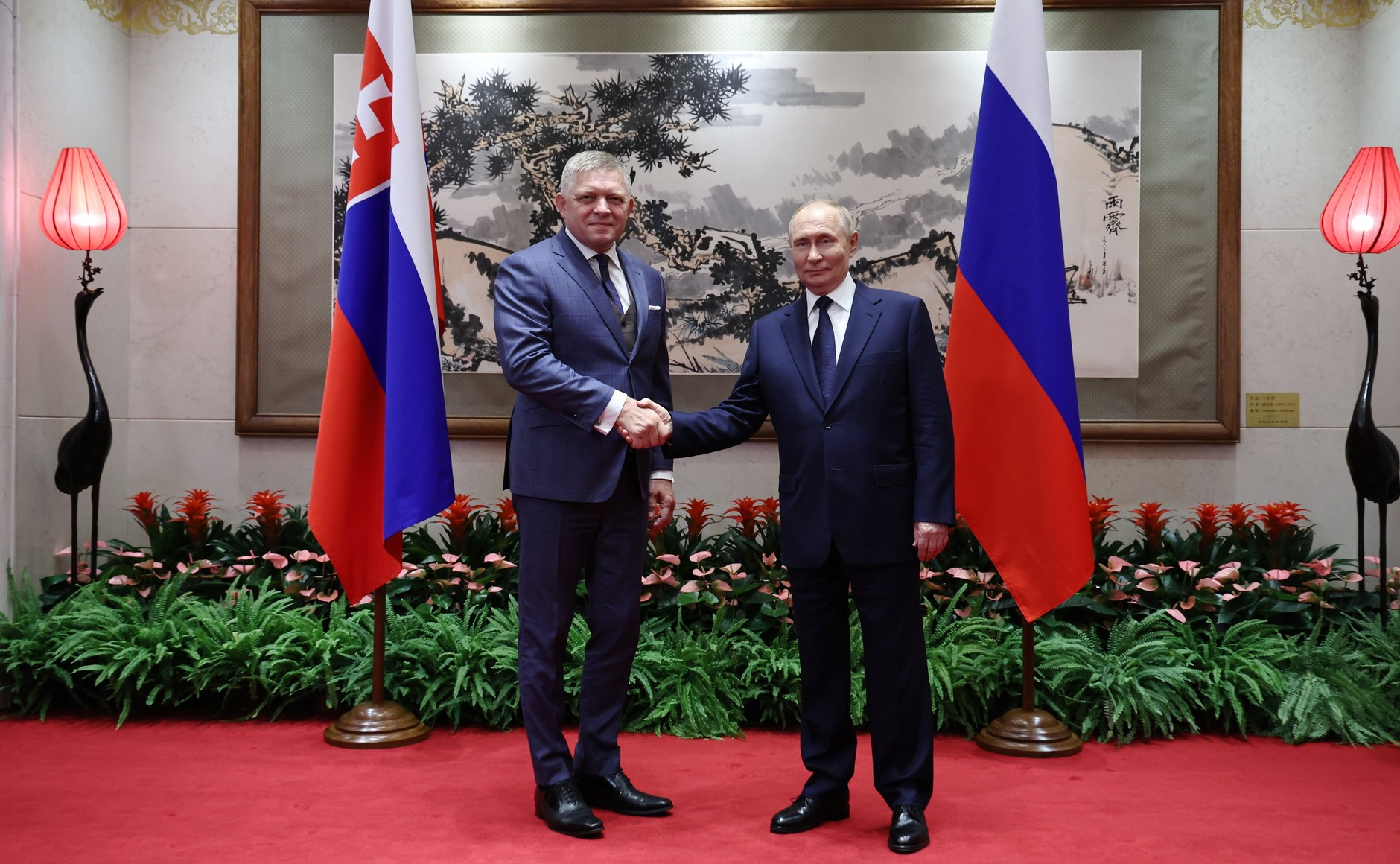
Fico meeting Russian president Vladimir Putin in Beijing, China, 2 September 2025

The European Commission first unveiled its proposal for the 19th sanctions package on September 19, 2025. Fico made his opposition public and conditional as early as September 11, 2025, before the official proposal, when he met with European Council President António Costa, stating he would not support new sanctions unless the European Commission presented concrete proposals on energy prices and the automotive industry.

In October 2025, Fico invoked his veto power again to block a new round of sanctions. He explicitly conditioned his approval on the EU addressing the crisis in the Slovak automotive industry and high energy prices, accusing Brussels of prioritizing aid to Ukraine over Europe's economic competitiveness.

In a speech delivered in the National Council of Slovakia, Fico dismissed the objective to "bring Russia to its knees," and stated that the World knows "Russians only get on their knees to tie their shoelaces".

The standoff over the 19th sanctions package lasted for weeks, with Slovakia being the final member state holding up the unanimous approval required for the measure. Fico, maintaining his focus on domestic issues, publicly stated that the European Union is "in the shit" but still planning to support the anti-Russian sanctions package itself. Ahead of the European Council summit, Fico ultimately lifted his veto in late October, after EU leaders agreed to include specific language regarding high energy prices and the European automotive sector in the summit's conclusions, clearing the way for the package's formal adoption.

=== REPowerEU ===
On October 20, 2025, the Council of the European Union agreed on its negotiating position for a regulation under the REPowerEU roadmap to phase out Russian gas (pipeline and LNG). The plan sets a legally binding prohibition on new Russian gas contracts from January 1, 2026, with existing long-term contracts allowed to run until January 1, 2028. This phase-out plan is particularly relevant for Slovakia, which currently receives a portion of its Russian gas supply via the TurkStream pipeline. Fico called this plan an "imbecilic".

Slovakia, along with Hungary, voted against the regulation, expressing concerns about the impact on their energy security. However, this dissent was ineffective in blocking the measure, as the regulation was approved by a qualified majority vote, which does not require unanimity.

In early December 2025, Slovakia and Hungary announced they will file a joint lawsuit with the European Court of Justice to challenge the mandatory gas phase-out, labeling the EU decision a blatant attack on their national sovereignty and a potentially ruinous threat to their economies.

On January 27, 2026, Slovakia officially announced it would file a lawsuit against the European Union over the mandatory phase-out of Russian gas, following a similar move by Hungary a day earlier. Both nations filed their challenges shortly after the regulation's formal adoption on January 26, arguing that the EU used a "legal trick" to bypass the need for a unanimous vote.

=== Frozen Russian assets ===
In November 2025, Fico has stated that Slovakia will not support the European Union's plan to use frozen Russian assets to finance military costs in Ukraine. Fico called the EU initiative controversial, warning that seizing the assets for military aid would only prolong the war, and argued that the focus should be on a peace plan. He emphasized that Slovakia would not participate in any legal or financial schemes directed at using the frozen funds for Ukrainian military spending and stated, "This piece of Russian cheese smells extremely tempting to the European raven".

On December 12, 2025, the EU used an emergency rule to permanently lock up €210 billion in Russian state money, a measure opposed by Slovakia and Hungary, which successfully prevents them from using their veto power to block the funds' future use for Ukraine's reconstruction.

On December 19, 2025, the EU summit concluded with a unanimous agreement to provide Ukraine with a €90 billion loan for 2026–2027 funded through joint borrowing on capital markets rather than the direct seizure of frozen assets, though Slovakia and Hungary secured an opt-out from the loan's financial guarantees while the Russian funds remain permanently immobilized as potential collateral.

In a critique of the European Union's priorities, he stated, "If for Western Europe the life of a Russian or a Ukrainian is worth shit, I do not want to be part of such a Western Europe".

=== 20th sanctions package ===
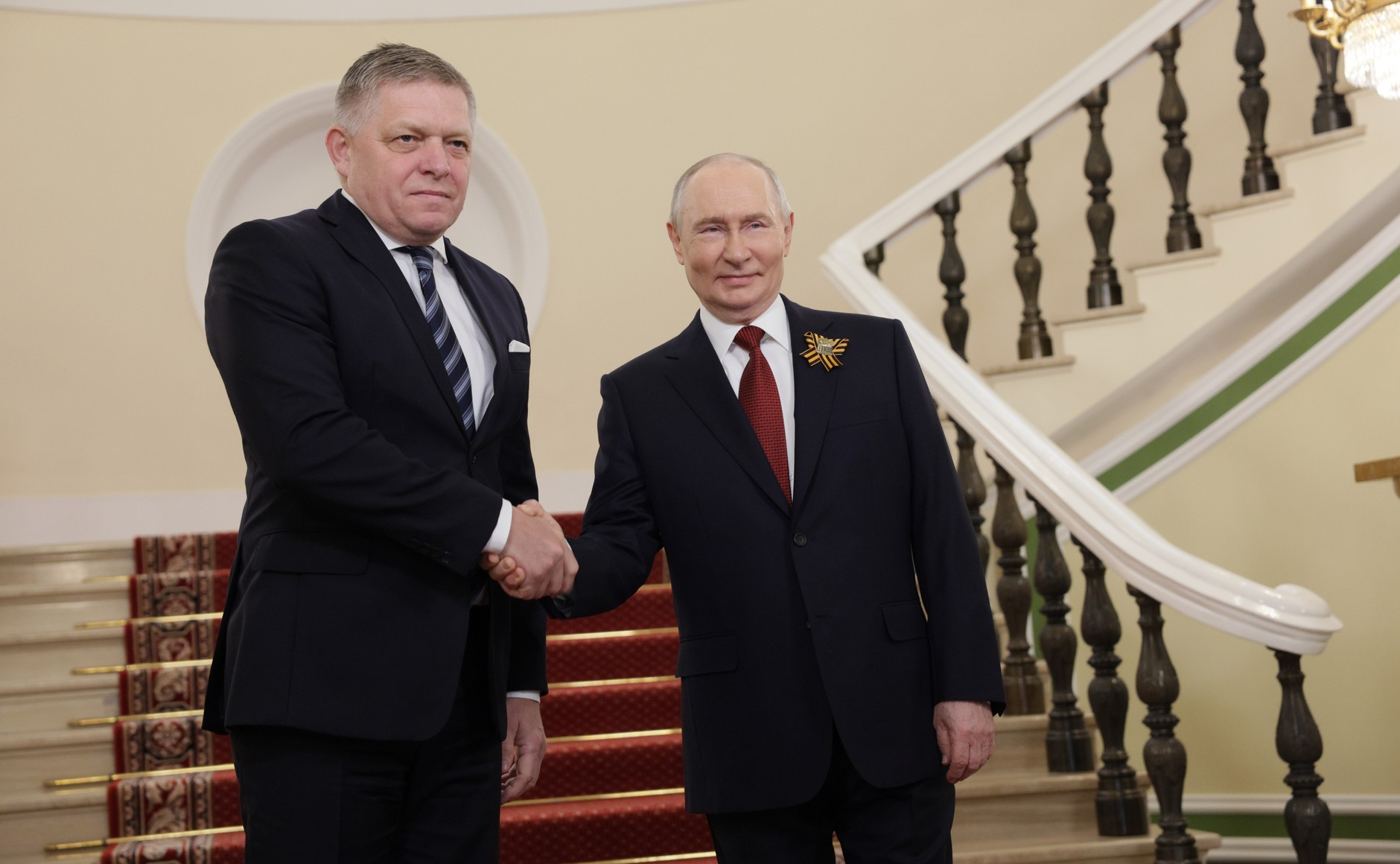
Fico meeting Russian president Vladimir Putin in the Moscow Kremlin, Russia, 9 May 2026

In February 2026, Slovakia joined Hungary in blocking the European Union's 20th sanctions package against Russia, preventing its adoption ahead of the fourth anniversary of the full-scale invasion of Ukraine. The opposition was primarily tied to a dispute over the Druzhba oil pipeline, which had seen halted deliveries since late January following Russian strikes on Ukrainian infrastructure. Bratislava and Budapest have accused Kyiv of intentionally delaying repairs to the pipeline, effectively using their veto as leverage to restore oil transit.

Fico has taken a particularly hardline stance, viewing the sanctions as "self-destructive" for the Slovak economy while failing to stop the conflict. He argued that the EU's focus is misplaced, stating, "Just as we devised 20 sanctions packages, we should have devised 20 peace initiatives".

EU High Representative Kaja Kallas expressed deep regret over the deadlock, describing it as a "setback and message we didn't want to send" on such a somber anniversary. Kallas emphasized that the vetoes undermine the "principle of sincere cooperation" enshrined in EU treaties and criticized the use of unrelated energy disputes to block support for Ukraine.

On April 23, 2026, Slovakia and Hungary officially withdrew their vetoes, allowing the 20th sanctions package to be adopted. This reversal was directly linked to the resumption of crude oil flows through the Druzhba pipeline, which began reaching Slovak territory on the morning of April 23 after Ukraine completed necessary infrastructure repairs.

=== Resistance to renewal of Russia sanctions ===
In early March 2026, Slovakia, alongside Hungary, threatened to block the extension of European Union personal sanctions against Russian individuals unless several names were removed from the blacklist. Slovak Prime Minister Robert Fico and Foreign Minister Juraj Blanár specifically advocated for the delisting of high-profile figures, including oligarchs Alisher Usmanov and Mikhail Fridman, arguing that the evidence against them was insufficient.

Under EU law, these restrictive measures are not permanent and must be renewed every six months (or sometimes twelve) by a unanimous vote of all 27 member states. If the Council fails to reach a consensus by the expiration deadline,which in this instance was March 15, the sanctions automatically lapse, resulting in the immediate unfreezing of assets and the lifting of travel bans for all individuals on the list.

The opposition party Progressive Slovakia (PS) has sharply criticized the Ministry of Foreign and European Affairs for its stance. PS presidium member and former Foreign Minister Ivan Korčok described the situation as a "scandal" that demonstrates Russia's direct influence on Slovak foreign policy. At a press conference on Friday, March 13, Korčok questioned why the removal of these two specific individuals from a list of over 2,600 sanctioned persons should be in Slovakia's national interest.

Slovakia withdrew its objection on March 14, following diplomatic negotiations. The EU Council utilized a "silent procedure" to reach a unanimous decision, extending the sanctions regime for an additional six months and ensuring that high-profile figures such as Alisher Usmanov and Mikhail Fridman remained on the list. The shift in position was noted by several EU diplomats as a "U-turn," with one official describing the situation as "strange" and noting that Slovakia had not provided a clear explanation for the sudden change in stance.

=== 21st sanctions package ===
Following the political defeat of Hungarian Prime Minister Viktor Orbán in the 2026 parliamentary election, Bratislava lost its primary regional ally in forming a voting coalition to challenge or stall EU consensus.

On July 23, 2026, the European Union officially adopted its 21st package of sanctions against Russia and Belarus. During negotiations leading up to its approval, Slovakia raised no formal objections and opted not to exercise a veto against the measure. Because the proposal focused primarily on closing trade loopholes, curbing shadow fleet operations and restricting financial institutions and cryptocurrency platforms rather than imposing immediate, unmanaged cutoffs to pipeline energy imports, it did not threaten Slovakia's domestic fuel security.

=== Rejection of EU sanctions extension plan ===
In September 2026, Slovakia blocked an EU proposal to extend the renewal cycle for individual sanctions against Russia from six months to 12 months. The proposed change sought to streamline the review process for asset freezes and travel bans covering over 3,000 Russian individuals and entities ahead of their mid-September expiration. During EU ambassadorial meetings, Slovak representatives stood alone in insisting on keeping the six-month review schedule. Additionally, Slovak representatives requested the delisting of specific Russian oligarchs from the sanctions register as a condition of their agreement.

Later, France joined Slovakia in demanding specific delistings, specifically pushing for Russian billionaire Alisher Usmanov's removal in relation to a national interest deal, while Bratislava requested the delisting of Mikhail Fridman.

To prevent the entire sanctions regime from expiring on 22 September 2026, EU member states reached a broad compromise that fundamentally altered the sanctions timeline, expanding the renewal cycle to 36 months through September 2029. Under the agreement, France and Slovakia dropped their vetoes regarding the extension duration in exchange for the EU agreeing to delist Usmanov and Fridman from the individual sanctions register.

=== Rejection of global pledge on returning Ukrainian children ===
In September 2026, during the multilateral Pathways to Peace conference in Toronto, Slovakia refused to join a global declaration, the Toronto Pledge, aimed at securing the safe return of forcibly deported Ukrainian children. Slovakia stood out as the only European Union member state among the 27 EU nations to refused to sign the pledge. The boycott was publicly revealed on October 9, 2026, by the Slovak opposition party Freedom and Solidarity.

On November 2, 2026, State Secretary for Foreign Affairs Marek Eštok handed formal diplomatic notes to the Ukrainian and Canadian ambassadors, confirming Slovakia's official accession to the International Coalition for the Return of Ukrainian Children. Slovak diplomatic officials stated that the position was reconsidered following the October summit of European Council.

Despite the government's accession to the coalition, on November 12, 2026, four Slovak Members of the European Parliament from Robert Fico's ruling Direction – Social Democracy party, Ľuboš Blaha, Erik Kaliňák, Judita Laššáková and Katarína Roth Neveďalová, voted against a European Parliament resolution condemning Russia's forcible deportation of Ukrainian children and demanding their immediate return. The resolution passed with 536 votes in favor and 8 against, with the four Direction – Social Democracy party lawmakers accounting for half of all opposing votes.

== 2025 Chalk Revolution ==
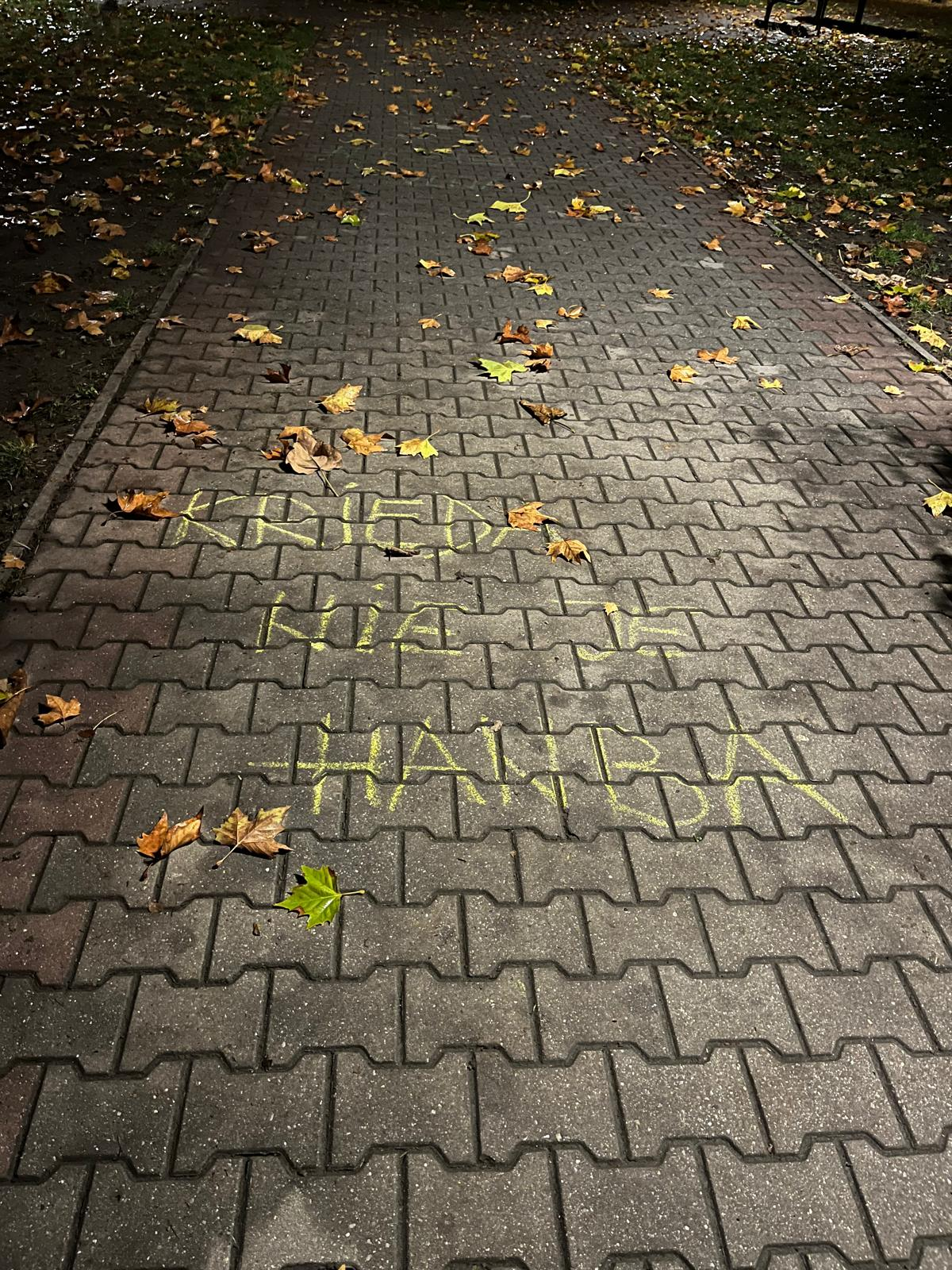
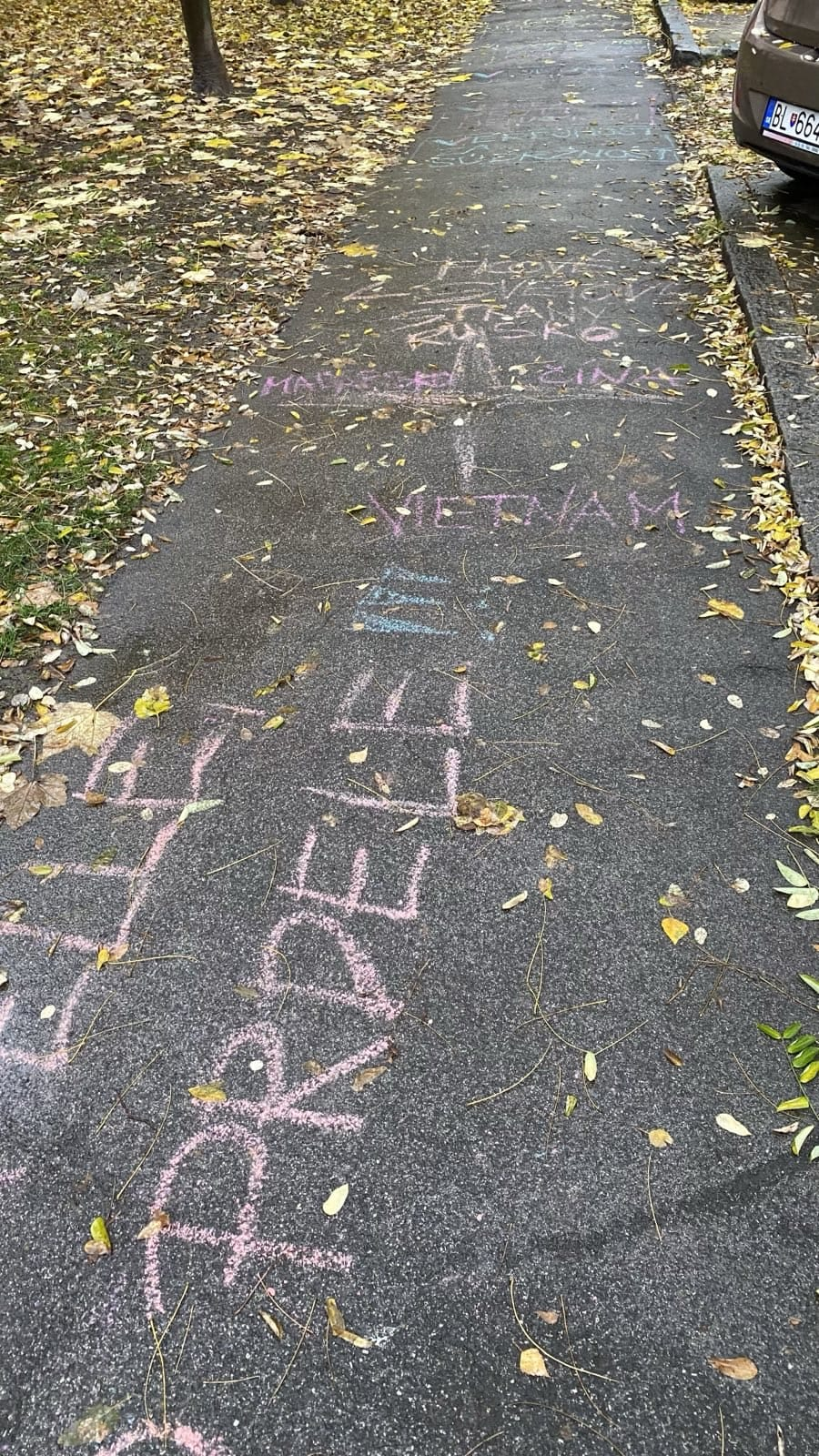
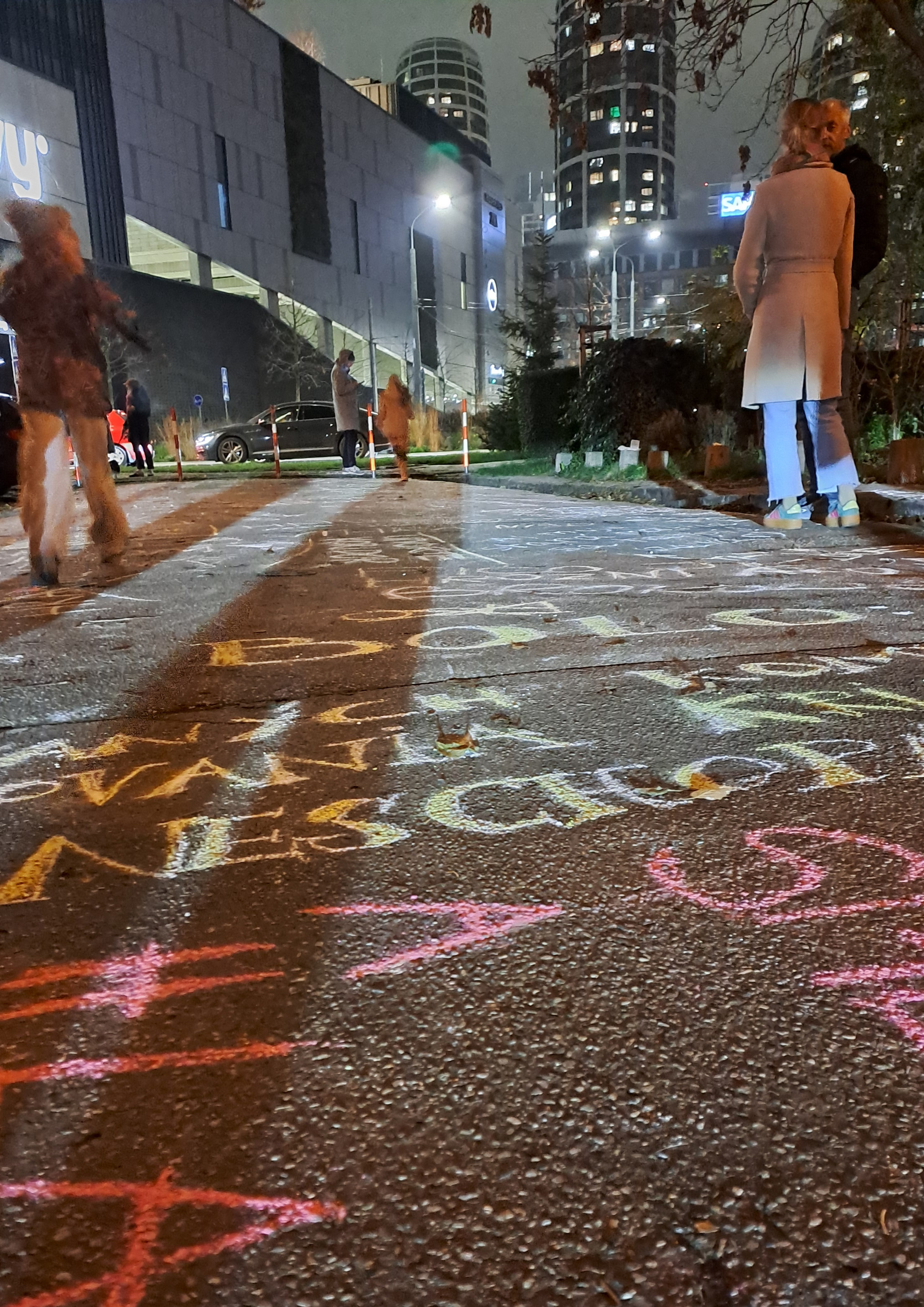
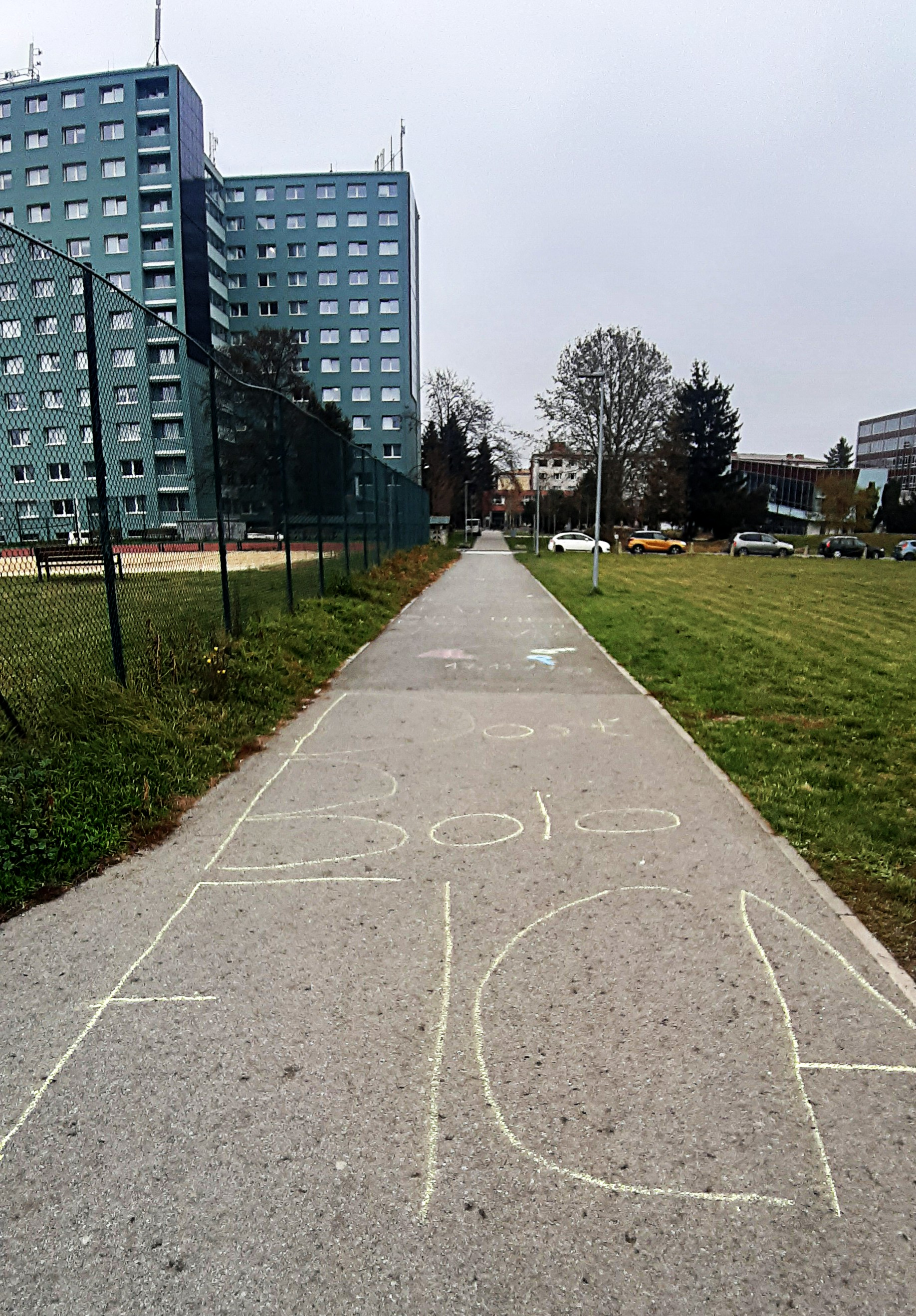
Chalk protest signs across Slovakia

The "Chalk Revolution (Kriedová revolúcia)", also called the "Chalk November Wave (Kriedová novembrová vlna)", was a grassroots protest movement that swept across Slovakia in November 2025. It began after a 19-year-old student, nicknamed "Muro", was taken from his classroom by police for questioning after he used chalk to write anti-government slogans outside his school in Poprad on 7 November 2025. The incident occurred shortly before a scheduled official visit by Slovak Prime Minister Robert Fico to the school. The student was released without charge in the same day.

A few days later, during a talk at another high school in Poprad, Fico said the European Union plans to spend €140 billion "to prolong the war" in Ukraine, resulting in a backlash from the students. In response, Fico said "If you're such heroes, go and fight in Ukraine".

In a display of solidarity with students, thousands of chalk signs and messages, ranging from "Enough of Fico" to pro-European and pro-Ukraine symbols, appeared on sidewalks, squares, and in front of government buildings in dozens of cities across Slovakia.

The protests reached their peak on November 17, 2025, when tens of thousands of people gathered in Bratislava and other cities to mark the anniversary of the Velvet Revolution and to demand Fico's resignation. The rallies were organised by opposition parties and civic group. "Muro" and opposition leaders spoke at the rally in Bratislava. However, due to deteriorating weather conditions, the "Chalk November Wave" concluded shortly thereafter, as the outdoor elements, specifically rain and snow, made continued chalk-based demonstrations impractical.

== See also ==
- 2026 Druzhba pipeline dispute
- 2025 Slovakia–Ukraine gas dispute
- Support for Russia in the Russo-Ukrainian war
- Hungary and the Russian invasion of Ukraine
- International sanctions during the Russian invasion of Ukraine
- International sanctions during the Russo-Ukrainian war
- European Union sanctions
