= 2025 Slovakia–Ukraine gas dispute =

Due to Gazprom and Naftogaz contract termination

- Part of the Russo-Ukrainian war (2022–present), the Russia–Ukraine gas disputes and the 2024–2025 Slovak protests
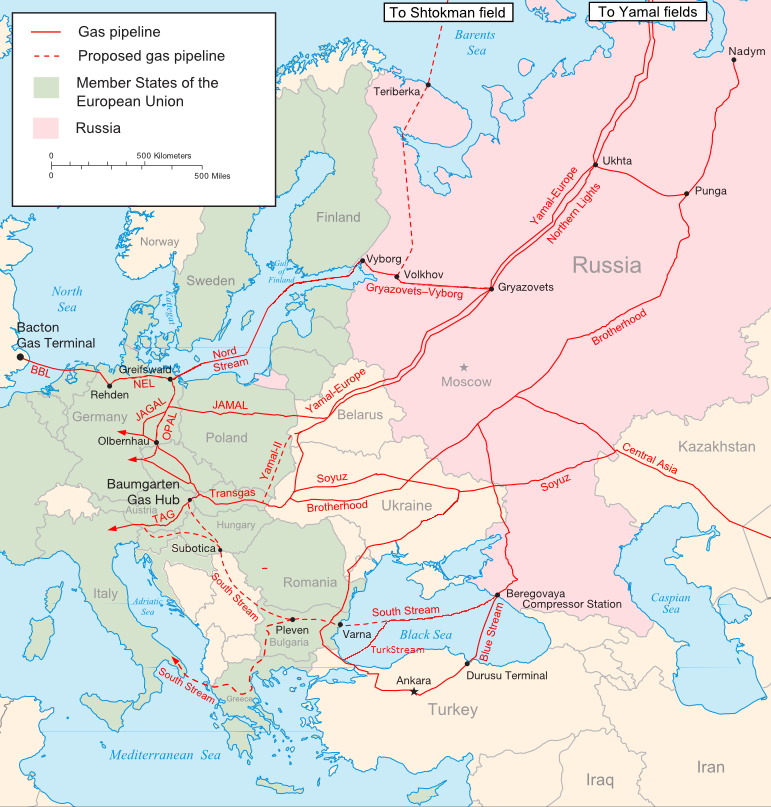
- Natural gas pipelines from Russia to Europe.
- Date: 1 January 2025 – 1 February 2025 (1 month)
- Location: Slovakia, Ukraine
- Caused by: Expiration of the 2019 gas transit contract between Russia's Gazprom and Ukraine's Naftogaz
- Result: Cessation of direct Russian gas transit via Ukraine to Slovakia and other Central European countries; Heightened tensions between the Slovak and Ukrainian governments; Accelerated EU efforts to phase out Russian gas imports; Slovakia began importing Russian gas through TurkStream on February 1, 2025

Parties
Slovakia; Russia	Ukraine

Lead figures
Robert Fico Vladimir Putin	Volodymyr Zelenskyy

The 2025 Slovakia–Ukraine gas dispute was a major diplomatic and energy security crisis that began on January 1, 2025, following the expiration of the five-year natural gas transit contract between the Russian state-owned energy company Gazprom and Ukraine's Naftogaz.

The cessation of gas transit through the Ukrainian pipeline network, a route that supplied gas to several Central and Southern European countries, including Slovakia, led to a sharp dispute between the governments of Slovakia and Ukraine.

== Background ==
For decades, the Soviet-era pipeline network running through Ukraine served as a crucial transit route for Russian gas to Europe. Despite the 2022 Russian invasion of Ukraine, gas transit continued under a contract signed in 2019, providing Ukraine with significant revenue and offering a reliable supply to European countries like Austria, Hungary, and Slovakia, which remained heavily dependent on Russian pipeline gas.

Ukraine announced its decision not to renew the transit contract after its expiration on January 1, 2025, citing its policy of cutting off funding sources for Russia's war effort and aligning with the EU's goal of energy independence.

The expired contract was a five-year "ship-or-pay" agreement between Russia's Gazprom and Ukraine's Naftogaz, initially obligating Gazprom to pay for the transit of 40 billion cubic meters (bcm) of gas per year. By the contract's final year, actual flows had dropped significantly (to approximately 14-15 bcm in 2024) but Ukraine continued to receive full transit fees. The contract's termination eliminated this guaranteed revenue stream, costing Ukraine an estimated $450–$500 million annually.

This move put immediate economic pressure on Slovakia, which relied on the pipeline for a significant portion of its gas supply and earned an estimated hundreds of millions of euros annually in transit fees from the gas flowing onward to other European destinations. The transit halt meant that roughly 5% of the European Union's total gas supply, heavily concentrated in Central and Southern Europe, needed to be immediately replaced by alternative routes.

== Dispute ==
On January 1, 2025, gas transit through Ukraine to Slovakia, Austria, and Hungary ceased. While most European Union countries had largely diversified their energy supply following the 2022 invasion, the halt disproportionately affected Slovakia due to its high reliance on the pipeline and its geographical location.

=== Slovak reaction ===
Slovak prime minister Robert Fico sharply criticized Ukraine's decision, labeling it "politically motivated" and detrimental to the energy security and economic interests of smaller EU nations. Fico claimed that the halt would cost Slovakia an estimated €500–600 million annually in lost transit fees and force the country to incur up to €1 billion in extra costs for securing alternative supplies.

In response to the gas transit halt, Fico's government issued a set of retaliatory threats against Ukraine, stating his party would consider halting the supply of emergency electricity—upon which Ukraine relies from synchronized EU neighbors during Russian attacks on its grid—significantly lowering support and reducing aid for Ukrainian refugees in Slovakia, and demanding the renewal of gas transits or seeking compensation mechanisms to replace the lost public finances.

Ukraine's energy grid, already severely damaged by systematic Russian missile and drone attacks, relies on synchronization with the European network (ENTSO-E), which includes Slovakia's grid operator (SEPS). Cutting off the supply of emergency, back-up power would significantly increase the risk of a regional or national blackout in Ukraine, especially following a major Russian strike. Fico himself claimed Slovakia was the only country "capable of supplying (emergency) electricity to Ukraine within 30 minutes, otherwise their power grid may collapse".

The Slovak state-owned transmission system operator, SEPS, has a contract to supply Ukraine with up to 150 megawatts (MW) of emergency electricity. In the first 11 months of 2024, net electricity exports from Slovakia to Ukraine reached 2.43 terawatt-hours (TWh).

A large-scale blackout would shut down critical infrastructure, including hospitals, water purification plants, and central heating systems, exacerbating the humanitarian crisis for millions of Ukrainian citizens, particularly in the depths of winter.

The Czech Republic and Poland publicly supported Ukraine, criticizing Fico's pro-Russian stance.

Experts questioned the credibility of this threat, as Slovakia may not have the legal authority to unilaterally refuse emergency support to a fellow ENTSO-E member like Ukraine. The grid protocols require members to meet requests for emergency support unless doing so would endanger their own system.

Fico's government demanded the resumption of gas transit and suggested a mechanism where European, transnational entities would purchase the gas at the Russian-Ukrainian border and pay Ukraine for the transit, thereby sidestepping a direct contract renewal between Naftogaz and Gazprom. Kyiv rejected this proposal.

On January 10, Fico issued a highly inflammatory statement, declaring he was "fed up with" Ukrainian president Volodymyr Zelenskyy, whom he accused of "roaming Europe begging and blackmailing others, asking for money." Fico explicitly tied this severe rhetoric to the Slovak-Ukraine gas dispute, leveraging the criticism to formally denounce Ukraine as an unreliable partner.

=== Position of Ukraine ===
The Ukrainian government interpreted Fico's actions—specifically his threats to cut off crucial emergency electricity supplies—as serving Moscow's strategic interests. As a significant provider of back-up electricity, the potential loss of synchronized power from Slovakia would have severely exacerbated Ukraine's energy crisis.

The political and energy friction between the two countries escalated into a major rhetorical battleground. Ukrainian President Volodymyr Zelenskyy accused Fico of opening a "second energy front" against Ukraine. This charge, which became the central theme of Kyiv's stance in the dispute, alleged that Fico's actions were orchestrated by the Kremlin as a deliberate act of energy sabotage intended to compound the damage inflicted by Russia's relentless missile and drone strikes on the Ukrainian power grid.

The Slovak Foreign Ministry, however, strongly rejected the accusation of opening a "second energy front," calling Zelenskyy's statements "exaggerated" and "unfounded." Bratislava countered that its government was simply defending the strategic interests of the Slovak people against what it termed "sabotage" by Ukraine that had resulted in a significant loss of transit revenue.

The Ukrainian government, led by President Volodymyr Zelenskyy, defended the decision, stating it was a necessary step to align with the EU's long-term goal of energy independence from Russia and to remove Moscow's ability to use gas transit revenues to fund the war.

Ukrainian officials accused Fico of prioritizing ties with Moscow over European unity and the interests of the Slovak people. President Zelenskyy stated that Ukraine had offered assistance to Slovakia in transitioning away from Russian gas but that Fico had "arrogantly refused," choosing instead to "bet on Moscow".

=== Position of Russia ===
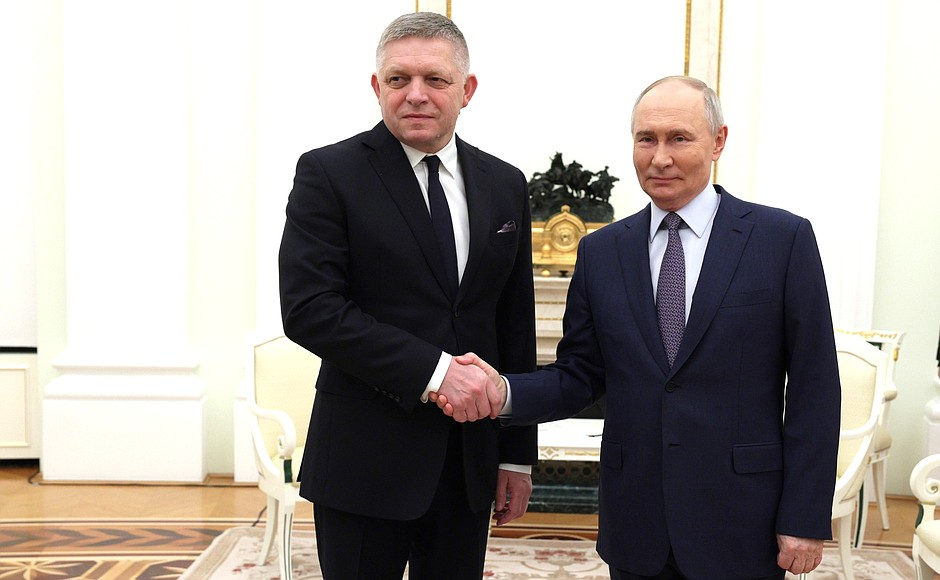
Fico meeting Russian president Vladimir Putin in the Moscow Kremlin, Russia, 22 December 2024

The Russian government and state-owned energy giant Gazprom officially blamed Ukraine for the halt, asserting that Russia had been prepared to continue supplies but that Kyiv's decision made this "practically impossible". Russia positioned itself as a willing and reliable supplier that was being blocked by a "politically motivated" decision from Ukraine.

A key factor in securing Slovakia's new gas route was Fico's working meeting with Russian President Vladimir Putin in Moscow in late December 2024, just before the contract's expiry. During this meeting, Putin publicly promised Fico that Russia's Gazprom would find alternative ways to deliver contracted gas to Slovakia after the Ukrainian transit ended. This promise underpinned Slovakia's successful pivot to the TurkStream pipeline, a development Russia was keen to emphasize as proof of its dependability and a way to maintain some market share in Central Europe and deepen the wedge between Slovakia and its EU/NATO allies. Gazprom made no move to renew the contract directly with Naftogaz but focused instead on securing the technical capacity for deliveries via the southern route.

== Protests ==
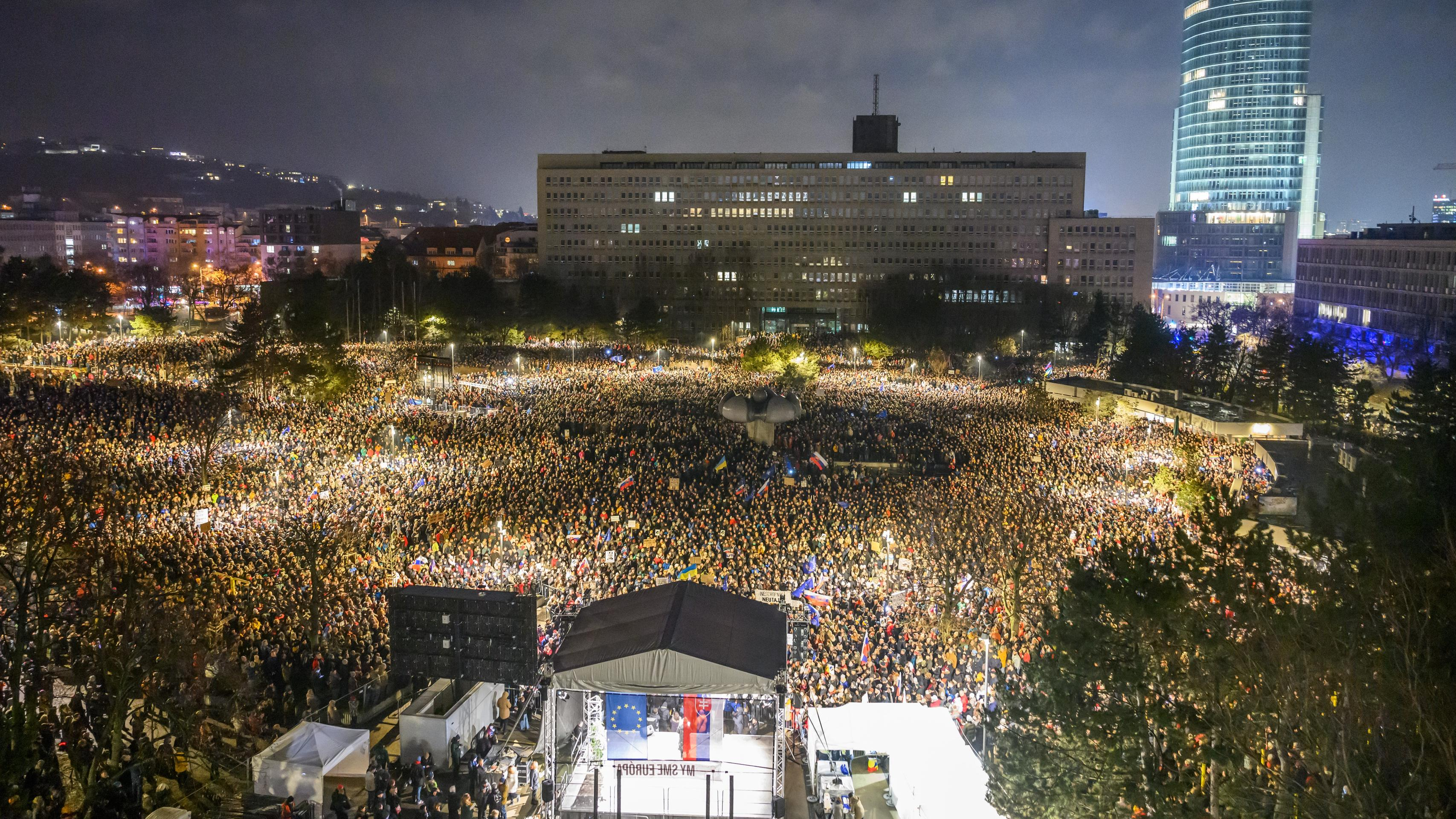
Protesters on Námestie Slobody in Bratislava, 24 January 2025

The public response in Slovakia regarding the gas dispute was characterized by extensive anti-government protests that directly opposed Fico's pro-Russian and anti-Ukrainian foreign policy. These widespread demonstrations, organized largely by the "Peace for Ukraine" civic group, were triggered by Fico's controversial visit to Moscow and his subsequent reaction to Ukraine's decision to halt the transit of Russian gas through its territory.

The protesters condemned Fico for threatening to retaliate against Kyiv by cutting off essential aid—including humanitarian supplies, electricity, and support for Ukrainian refugees—and for his aggressive stance which they argued jeopardized Slovakia’s alignment with the EU and NATO, emphasizing their belief that Fico was undermining Slovakia's democratic and European future.

== Alternatives ==
Slovakia had to rely on a combination of domestic gas reserves and alternative supply routes to offset the lost pipeline gas. The country began importing Russian gas via the TurkStream pipeline through Turkey and Hungary starting on February 1, 2025, with volumes set to significantly increase from April 2025; however, this new route only covered a fraction of the previous import volume and came with an additional cost estimated at €90 million in higher transit fees for SPP alone.

Consequently, Slovakia utilized its existing interconnections with Austria, the Czech Republic, and Poland, all of which had diversified their supplies with liquefied natural gas (LNG) and gas from Norway and Azerbaijan. The Czech Republic publicly offered its gas network capacity to support Slovakia.

In July 2025, Slovakia's state-owned gas supplier, SPP, leveraged an EU exemption to retain long-term contracts for Russian gas until the EU's final phase-out date.

In October 2025, Fico continued his campaign to resume Russian gas transit through Ukraine. During government consultations with Ukraine on October 17, Fico stated that Slovakia was ready to discuss the resumption of transit, arguing it was illogical for Slovakia to lose €500–€600 million annually in transit fees while Russia remains the EU's second-largest gas supplier. He pressed Ukraine to clarify the future use of its gas transit system post-war. Simultaneously, Fico also called for the preparation of resuming economic relations with Russia once the war ends.

Prime Minister Yulia Svyrydenko offered to transform the Slovak Republic into a new "regional energy hub" by technically synchronizing the two nations' systems and guaranteeing risk-free non-Russian energy supplies to Slovakia, urging a focus on new, reliable supply routes.

== REPowerEU ==
On October 20, 2025, the Council of the European Union agreed on its negotiating position for a regulation under the REPowerEU roadmap to phase out Russian gas (pipeline and LNG). The plan sets a legally binding prohibition on new Russian gas contracts from January 1, 2026, with existing long-term contracts allowed to run until January 1, 2028. This phase-out plan is particularly relevant for Slovakia, which currently receives a portion of its Russian gas supply via the TurkStream pipeline. Fico called this plan an "imbecilic".

Slovakia, along with Hungary, voted against the regulation, expressing concerns about the impact on their energy security. However, this dissent was ineffective in blocking the measure, as the regulation was approved by a qualified majority vote, which does not require unanimity.

== See also ==
- 2026 Druzhba pipeline dispute
- 2025 Moldovan energy crisis
- Slovak opposition to sanctions on Russia
- International sanctions during the Russian invasion of Ukraine
- International sanctions during the Russo-Ukrainian war
- European Union sanctions
