= Slovenská elektrizačná prenosová sústava =

Slovak transmission system operator

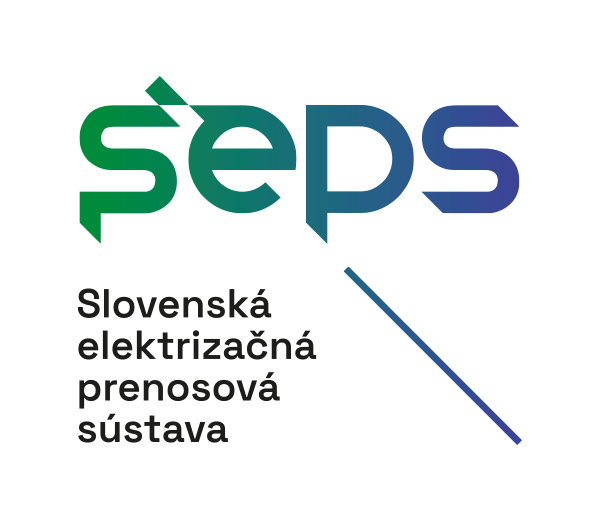

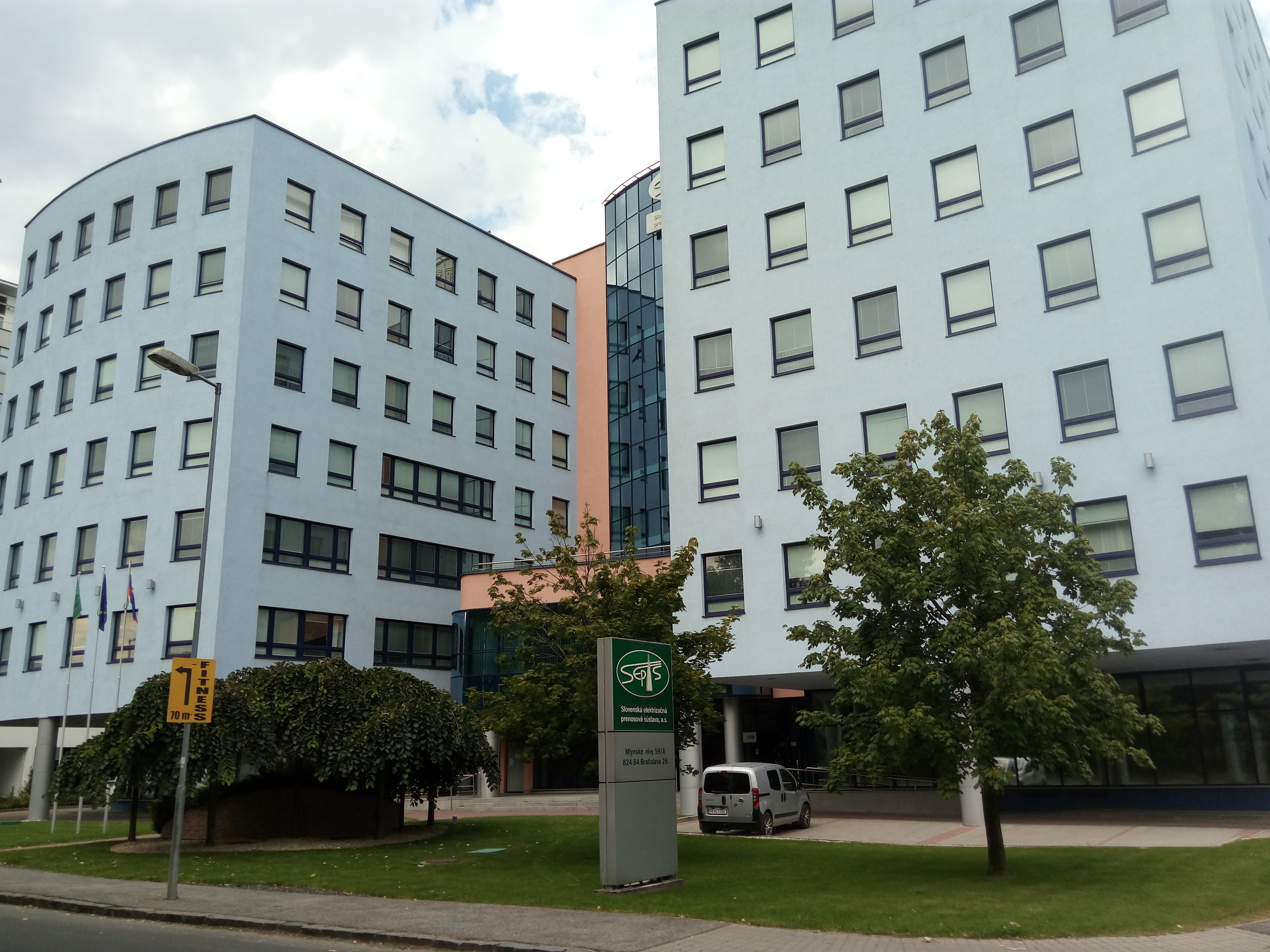
- Company type: Government-owned corporation
- Industry: Energy
- Genre: Transmission system operator
- Predecessor: Slovenské elektrárne
- Founded: 2002
- Headquarters: Bratislava, Slovakia
- Key people: Martin Magáth (CEO)
- Services: Power transmission
- Revenue: 371.67 mil Euro (2019)
- Owner: Government of Slovakia (State ownership)
- Number of employees: 546 (2019)
- Website: www.sepsas.sk

Slovenská elektrizačná prenosová sústava (SEPS) is the electricity transmission system operator in Slovakia.

In 2019, the company transmitted 28,619,358 GWh of electrical energy. It had 3,007,729 km of transmission lines: 2,138,282 at the 400 kV level, 825,886 at 220 kV and 79,796 at 110 kV.

In 2019, the company had 546 employees and its revenue was 371.67 mil. EUR. Since November 2023, the CEO is Martin Magáth.

== Gallery ==
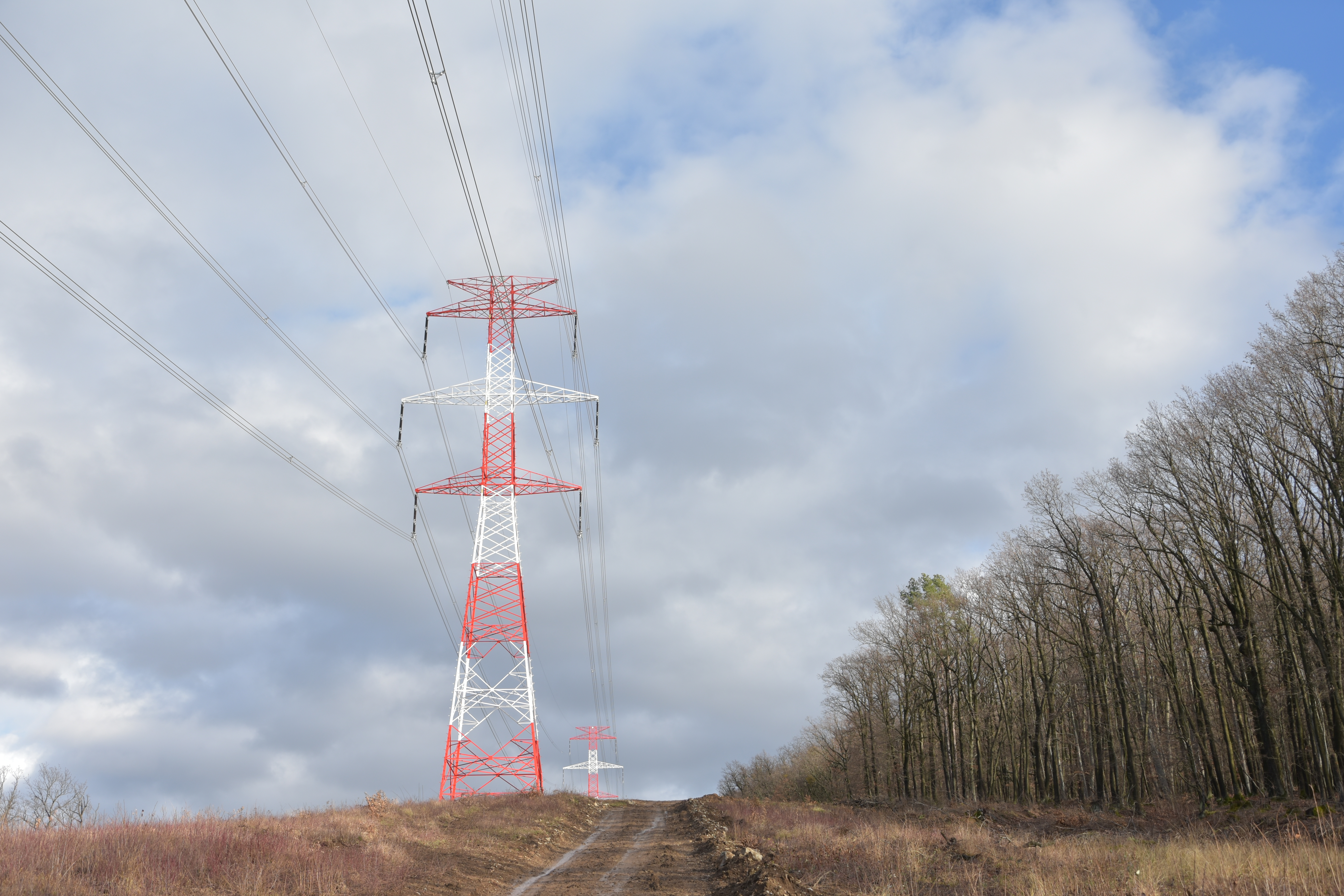
Double lines 483 and 484 (400 kV) near Partizánske

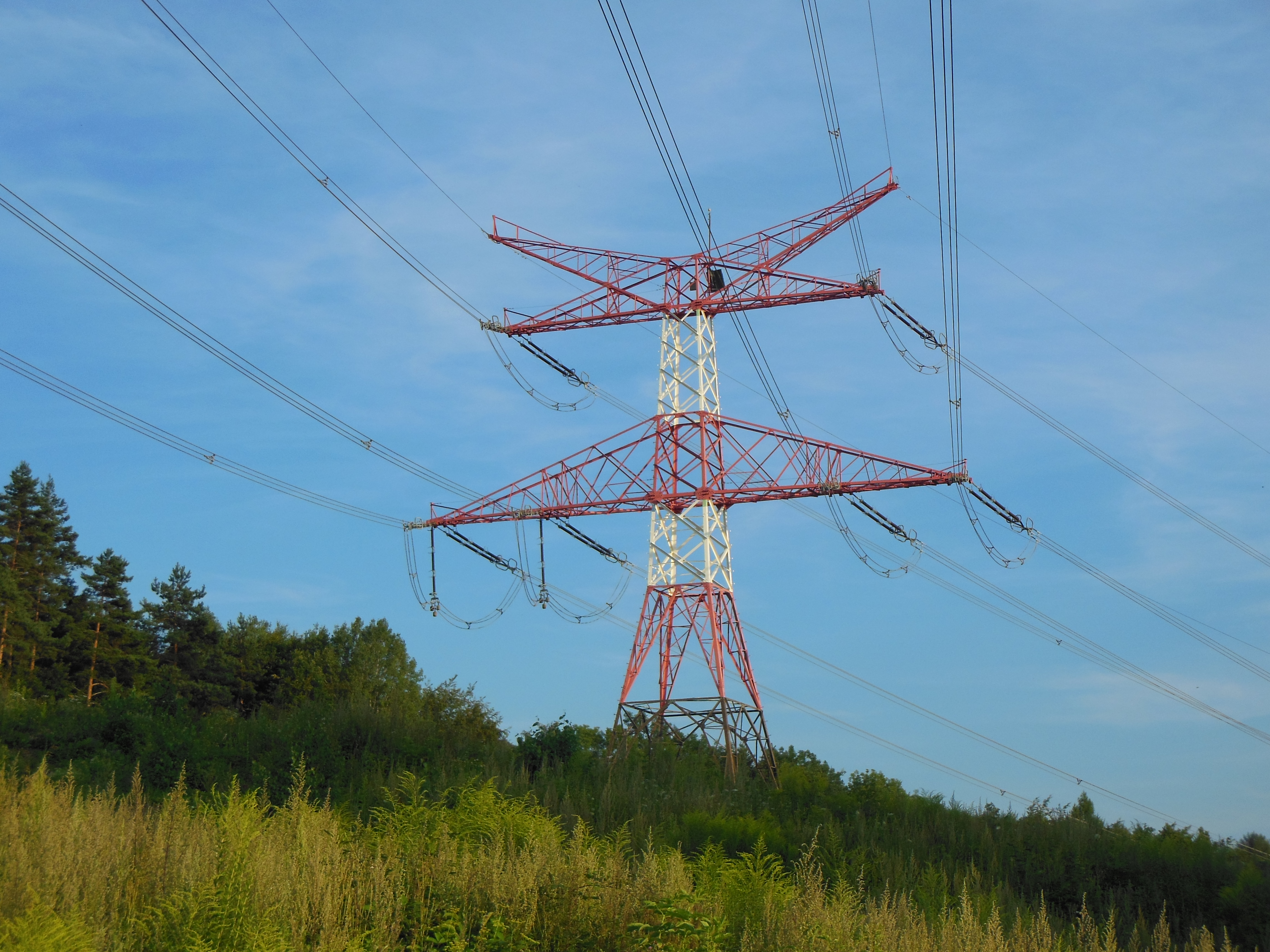
Double line 477 and 478 (400 kV) near Ruská Nová Ves

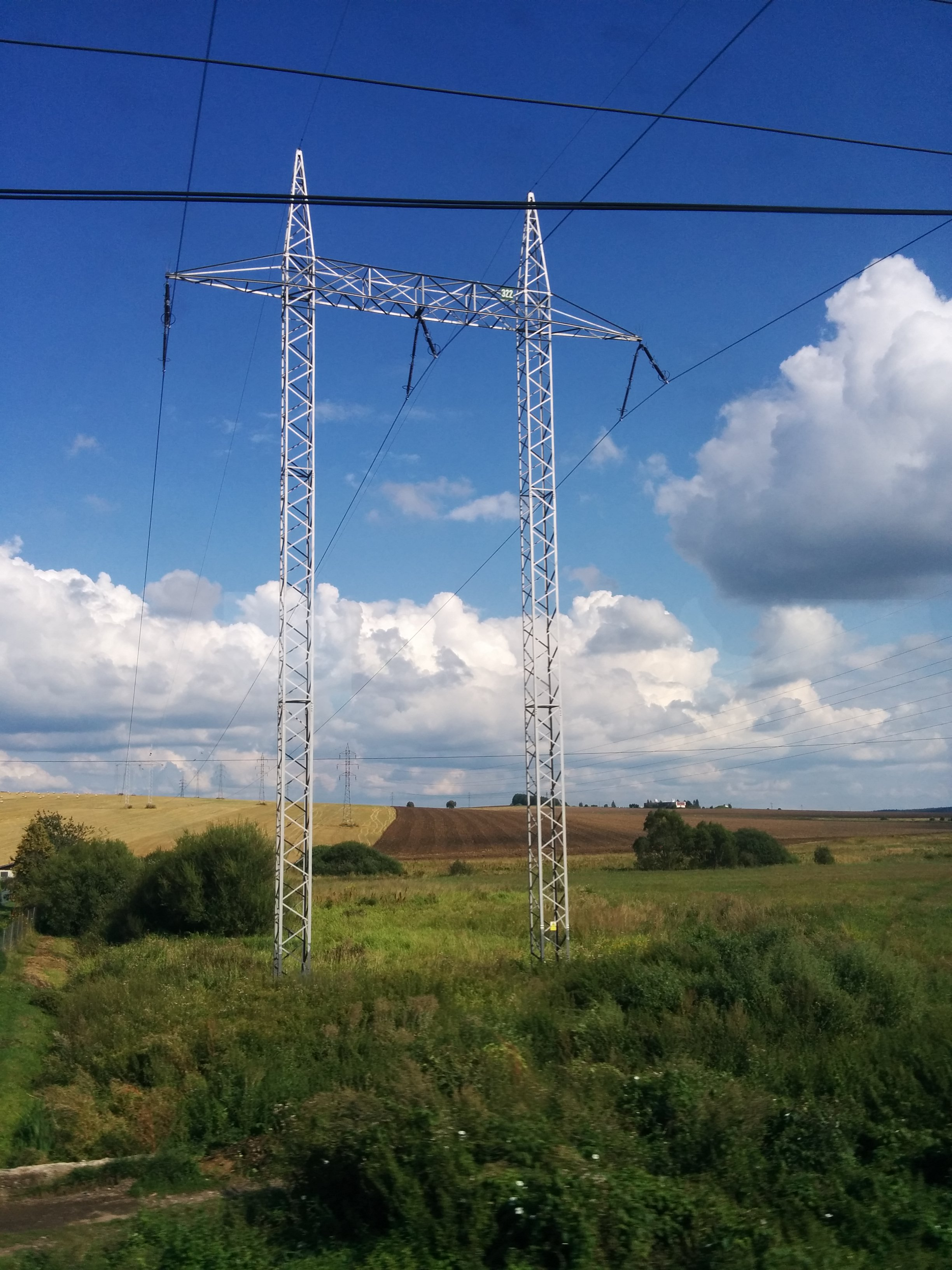
Line 273 (200 kV)

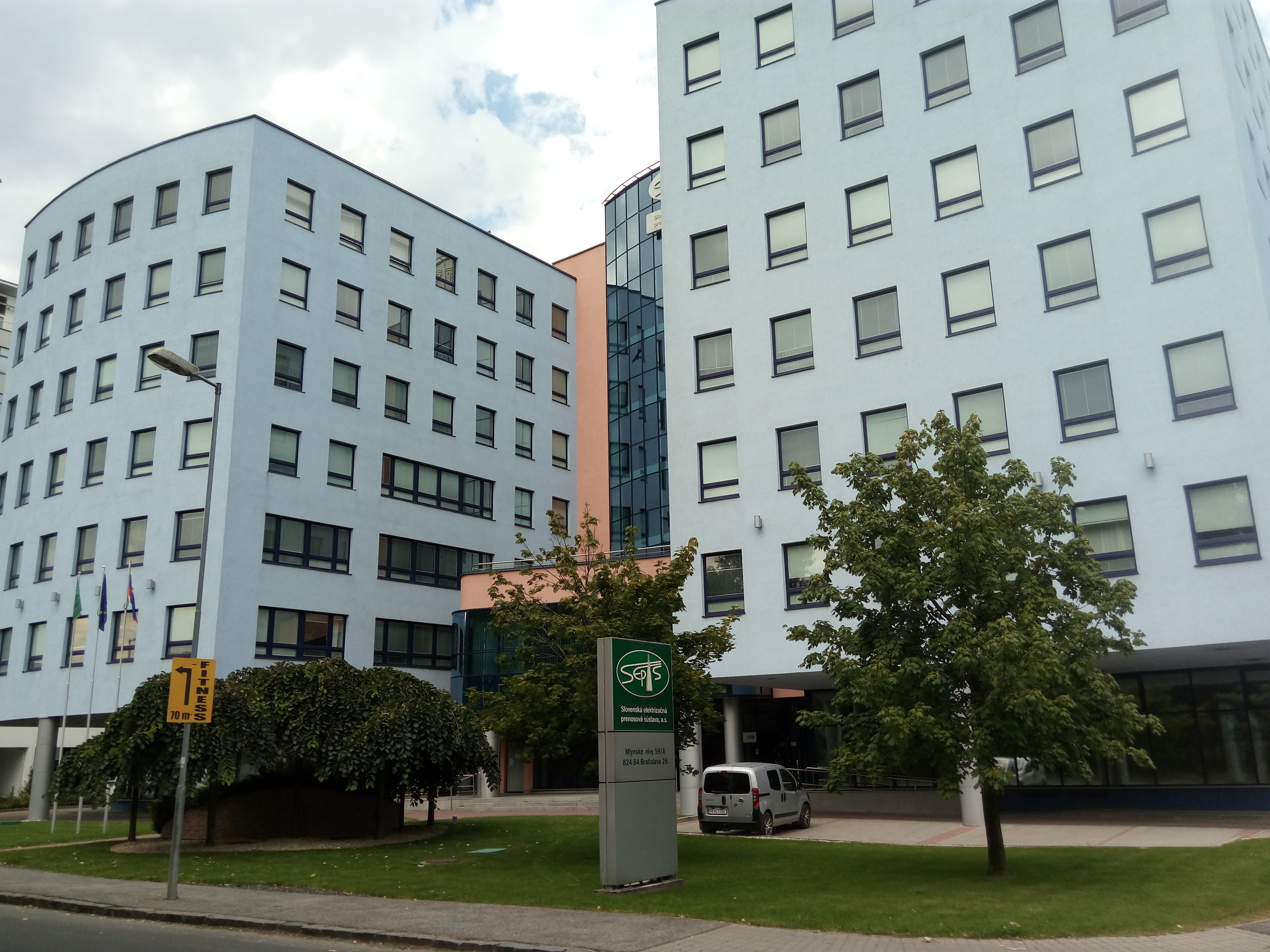
Company headquarters

== See also ==
- Energy in Slovakia
