= Przemysław Wipler =

Polish politician

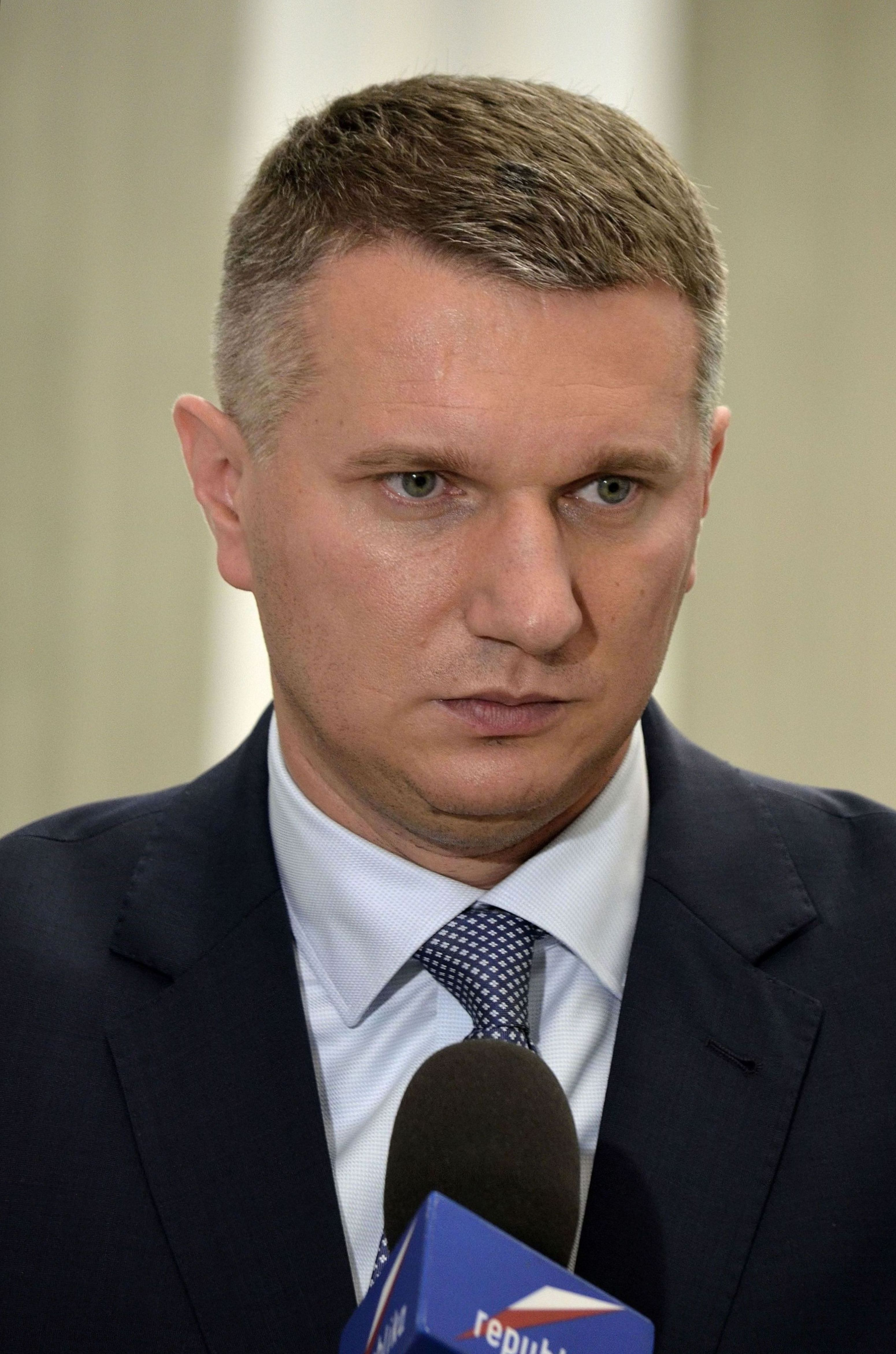
- Przemysław Wipler (2015)

Member of the Sejm
- Incumbent
- Assumed office 15 October 2023
- Constituency: Warsaw I
- In office 12 November 2011 – 12 November 2015
- Constituency: Warsaw I

Personal details
- Born: 15 July 1978 (age 48) Piekary Śląskie, Poland
- Party: New Hope (2023–present)
- Other political affiliations: UPR (1999–2005); PiS (2005–2013); Poland Together (2013–2014); KNP (2014–2017)
- Spouse: Marta Magdalena Wipler
- Children: 5
- Occupation: Politician

Przemysław Janusz Wipler (born 15 July 1978) is a Polish politician, serving as a Deputy in the Sejm since 15 October 2023. He has been a noted public policy figure.

== Biography ==
=== Early life and career ===
He was born in Upper Silesia, where his father worked as an underground miner. After his parents' divorce, Przemysław Wipler moved with his mother to Gdynia, where he graduated from the III General Secondary School. In 2002, he graduated from the University of Warsaw, obtaining a master's degree in law based on a thesis titled Libertarian Approach to the State. From 1999 to 2001, he was an editor for “Najwyższy Czas!”. He pursued doctoral studies at the SWPS University, writing a doctoral thesis on the Commission for the Reprivatization of Warsaw Real Estate. In 2023, however, he failed his doctoral defense.

He worked at the Adam Smith Centre and the Economic Action Foundation, as well as in tax advisory firms, including Ernst & Young. He was a member of the supervisory boards of the Petroleum Pipeline Operation Company Friendship and the Liquid Fuel Loading Company Naftoport. From 2005 to 2008, he served as the director of the Department of Diversification of Energy Sources Supply in the Ministry of Economy. From 2009 to 2011, he was vice president of the Bio-Alians company. In November 2015, he became a member of the supervisory board of NFI Magna Polonia. He also ran his own business, lecturing on energy security at the Collegium Civitas.

=== Politics ===
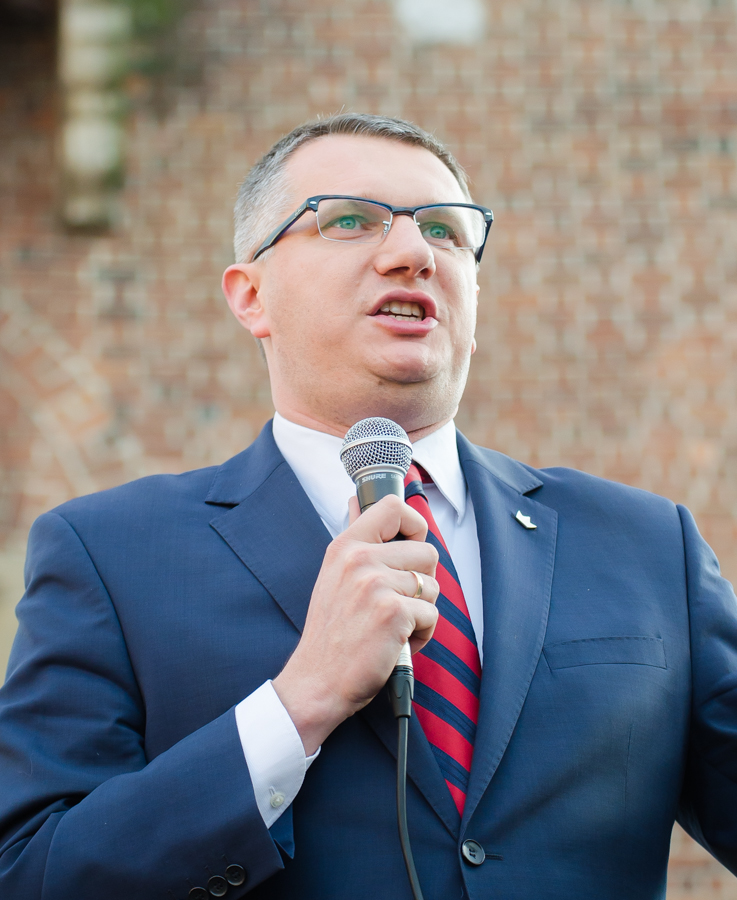
Przemysław Wipler at an election rally at the Main Market Square in Kraków (2015)

In 1999, he co-founded the KoLiber Association. He served as the president of the Warsaw branch and later as the president of the main board of this association. He was a member of the Real Politics Union (until 2000) and served as the party's spokesperson. From 2002 to 2005, he was the president of the Civic Responsibility Foundation. In 2009, he became the founder and later the president of the Republican Foundation (he stepped down in 2011). He is a columnist for the quarterly magazine "Rzeczy Wspólne".

In the 2002 Polish local elections, he unsuccessfully ran for the Warsaw City Council from the list of the Electoral Committee of Voters Julia Pitera (he received 1641 votes). In the 2005 Polish parliamentary election, he unsuccessfully ran for the Sejm from the Law and Justice list (he received 999 votes). In 2010, he became the president of the April 10 Movement. In the 2011 Polish parliamentary elections, he won a seat in the Sejm with 4615 votes in the Warsaw electoral district from the PiS list. In November of the same year, he joined PiS. He left in June 2013, also leaving the PiS parliamentary club and founding the Republican Association with a republican and conservative-liberal profile, where he became the president. In October of the same year, this organization signed an agreement with former MPs of the Civic Platform (PO), engaging in Jarosław Gowin's "An Hour for Poland" project. At the end of October, Przemysław Wipler resigned as president of the "Republicans" (in favor of Anna Streżyńska), but less than a month later he was re-elected. His association then participated in the formation of the Poland Together party. Przemysław Wipler became a member of the presidium of this party's board, but in February 2014, he left Poland Together with part of the "Republicans". In March, he began cooperating with the Congress of the New Right, and in May of that year, he became a member of this party.

At the KNP convention in October 2014, Przemysław Wipler was elected as the party's first vice president, but the convention's decisions were soon invalidated by the party court (although the common court registered the new authorities). He was the KNP candidate for mayor of Warsaw, placing 4th out of 11 candidates (receiving 4.21% of the vote). In January 2015, he announced the formation of a new party with Janusz Korwin-Mikke, named KORWiN after the aforementioned co-leader, now known as New Hope.

In 2014 and 2015, he was twice reprimanded by the Sejm Ethics Committee for violating Article 5 (principle of diligence), Article 6 (principle of caring for the good name of the Sejm), and Article 7 (principle of responsibility) of the Sejm's Code of Ethics.

In August 2015, he was appointed as one of the vice presidents of the KORWiN party. In the 2015 Polish parliamentary elections in October of that year, the KORWiN electoral committee did not pass the electoral threshold, Przemysław Wipler received 17,424 votes and did not get re-elected. The following month, he was replaced by Karol Rabenda as president of the "Republicans". In April 2017, Przemysław Wipler announced his resignation from active participation in the KORWiN party and withdrawal from political life. He engaged in business activities in the PR field and lobbying.

In July 2023, he returned to party activities (then operating under the name New Hope and part of the Confederation Liberty and Independence). In the 2023 Polish parliamentary elections, he obtained a seat in the Sejm, running from the first place of the Confederation in the Toruń electoral district and receiving 13,457 votes. In January 2024, he was appointed as the vice-chairman of the parliamentary committee on the alleged unlawful use of the Pegasus spyware by the former Law and Justice government.

In the 2024 Polish local elections, he ran for the office of mayor of Warsaw from the common list of Confederation and Bezpartyjni Samorządowcy. He placed 4th out of 6 candidates in the vote (receiving 4.45% of the vote).

He had business relations to the now defunct crypto exchange Zonda and, in early 2026, was castigated by prime minister Tusk for alleged lobbyism. Wipler brought a defamation case against Tusk to court.

== Criminal proceedings ==
In June 2014, the prosecutor of the Warsaw Śródmieście-Północ District Prosecutor's Office filed an indictment against Przemysław Wipler, accusing him of using violence to force police officers to abandon their lawful duties by assaulting them and insulting them. This incident allegedly occurred during a nighttime intervention outside one of the capital's clubs in October 2013, involving the MP, who was reportedly intoxicated. Przemysław Wipler waived his immunity, did not admit to the charges, claiming that he was the one beaten by the police officers.

In June 2016, he was found guilty of the alleged offenses in the first instance and sentenced to six months of imprisonment, suspended for two years, and a fine of PLN 10,000, and was ordered to apologize to the victims. The verdict became final as none of the parties filed an appeal.

== Personal life ==
He is married and has five children: three daughters and two sons. His wife is Marta Magdalena Wipler. He was a supernumerary of Opus Dei as of 2023.
