= Odesa–Brody pipeline =

Crude oil pipeline in Ukraine

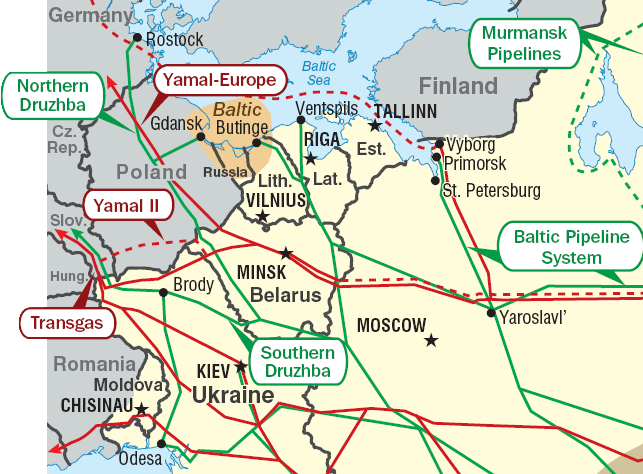
- A map showing the pipelines of Eastern Europe

Location
- Country: Ukraine (Poland)
- Direction: south–north–west
- Start: Pivdenne (Odesa suburb)
- Passes through: Brody, Płock
- To: Brody, (Gdańsk)

General information
- Type: oil
- Partners: UkrTransNafta, PERN Przyjazn SA, GOGC and the SOCAR, Klaipedos Nafta
- Operator: UkrTransNafta
- Commissioned: 2002

Technical information
- Length: 674 km (419 mi)

The Odesa–Brody pipeline (also known as Sarmatia pipeline) is a crude oil pipeline between the Ukrainian cities of Odesa, on the Black Sea, and Brody, near the Ukraine–Poland border. There are plans to extend it to Płock, and on to Gdańsk, both in Poland. The pipeline is operated by UkrTransNafta, Ukraine's state-owned oil pipeline company.

== History ==
The usage and direction of Odesa–Brody pipeline is considered to be of considerable geopolitical significance and has thus been the subject of both political disagreement and international pressure. Russia has repeated opposed the flow of oil from Brody to Poland and prefers to have the oil flow in the reverse direction from Russia to Brody and the Port of Pivdenny where the oil will be transported through the Turkish Straits (Bosphorus and Dardanelles) to Europe. (Note: To remove Russia's dependence upon Ukraine for the transportation of Russia's energy products, Russia began building in 2004 a massive oil complex at the Port of Taman on the Azov Sea to export oil by Tamanneftgaz (Russian: ЗАО «Таманьнефтегаз»), which has since 2004 as general director Alexander Mikhailovich Metkin (Russian: Александр Михайлович Меткин; born May 27, 1951 Moscow) and is owned by the Belgian Michel Litvak's associated Netherlands-registered United Transport and Forwarding Company (OTEKO) (Russian: ЗАО «Объединенная транспортно-экспедиторская компания»), from Russia through Turkey to Europe.) (Note: Russia exports petroleum along the Azov-Black Sea coasts through Novorossiisk, Tuapse, and the Port of Taman.)

Beginning in 1973, Armand Hammer developed the Port of Pivdenny into the deepest warm water port on the Azov-Black Sea coast able to handle vessels up to a draft of 18.5 metres (61 ft).

The pipeline was originally intended to reach Gdańsk in order to transfer oil from the Caspian Sea (mainly from Kazakhstan) to the Polish Baltic Sea port and from there to the rest of Europe. The Pivdenny maritime terminal west of Pivdenne, a suburb of Odesa, and the pipeline between Odesa and Brody was built in May 2002 by Ukrnaftogazbud and operated by UkrTransNafta. UkrTransNafta was established to develop the commercial attractiveness of the Odesa–Brody pipeline. From 2002 until 2004, flow of oil through the pipeline was idle. However, the pipeline remained unused until 2004.

However, as sufficient capacities of oil supplies were not agreed, on 5 July 2004 the Ukrainian cabinet accepted proposal of Russian oil companies to reverse the pipeline flow, and thus making it transfer Russian oil southwards to the Black Sea and from there to Mediterranean destinations and signed a long term agreement between Russia and Ukraine on August 18, 2004, ensuring the reverse flow of oil. Currently the oil is shipped to the pipeline from the junction of the southern branch of Druzhba pipeline.

Following the Orange Revolution and the election of Yulia Tymoshenko as Prime Minister who on March 5, 2005, announced that the oil would flow from Brody to Europe, Ukraine opposes Russia's plan.

On 24 March 2010, Ukraine's ambassador to Belarus proposed the pipeline begin operating in the averse direction in order to deliver Venezuelan crude to Belarusian refineries.

After the beginning of the Russo-Ukrainian War, the oil pipeline was stopped for two years – from 2014 to 2016.

In March 2020, Ukraine resumed transporting oil from Brody to Belarus and Poland.

== Technical features ==
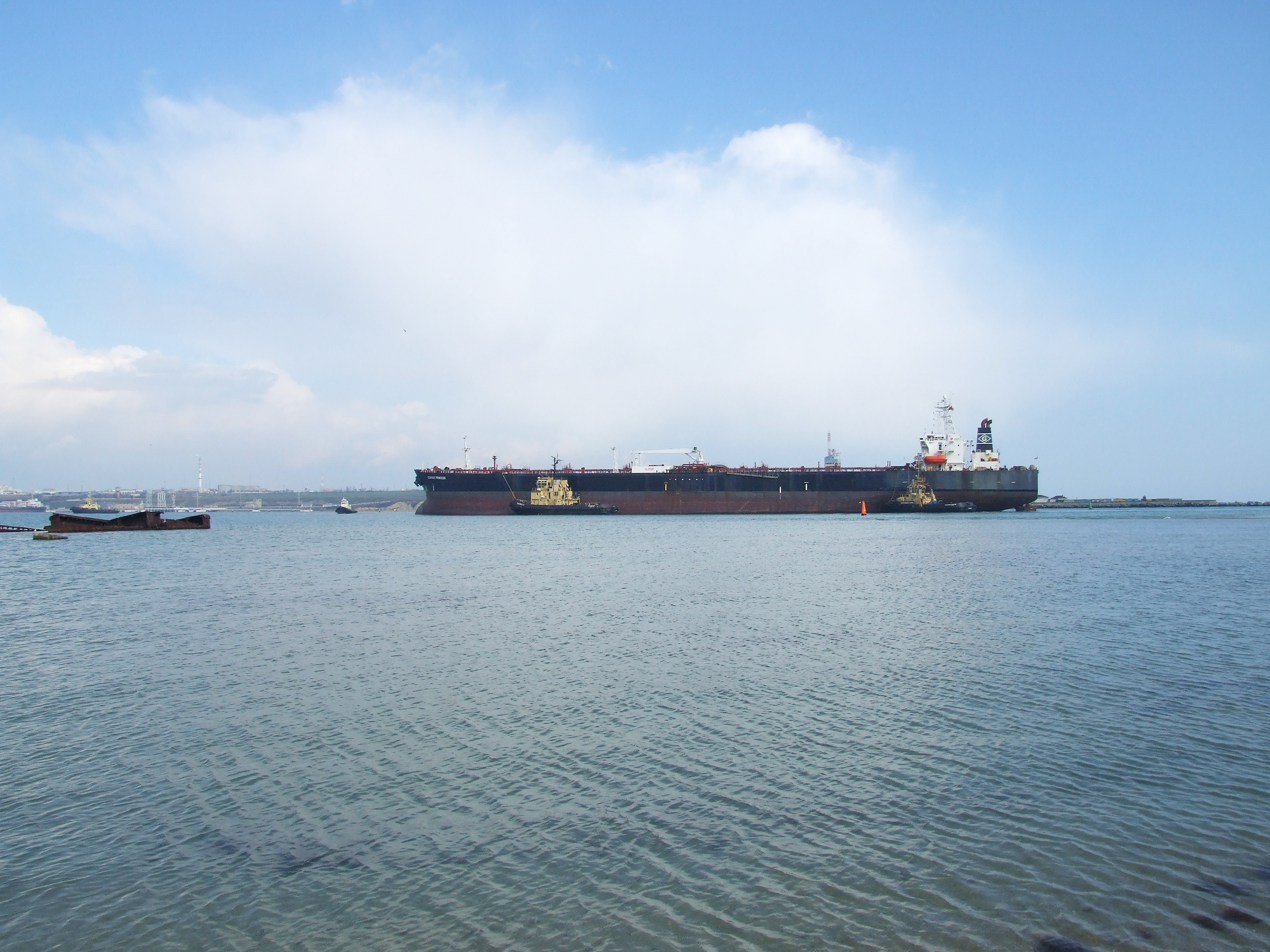
A tanker approaches pipeline's Pivdennyi Oil Terminal at Pivdennyi Port, Odesa Oblast.

The current length of the pipeline is 674 kilometres (419 mi). The pipeline is operated by Ukrtransnafta, and the oil is shipped by TNK-BP. In 2006 TNK-BP pumped 3.42 million tons of oil through the pipeline. In 2007, this volume was exceeded as already during seven month in January–July almost 5.3 million tons of oil were pumped transported.

== Expansion ==
There are ongoing intentions to implement original project. On 13 May 2003, the European Commission declared the Odesa–Brody–Płock oil transportation project as a project of Pan-European interest and the trilateral EU-Ukraine-Poland Joint Expert Working Group (OBP JEWG) was created.

In 2005, after the success of Viktor Yushchenko in the 2004 Ukrainian presidential election and the Orange Revolution, the new government has shown interest in using the pipeline in the direction originally intended, in order to transfer oil from the Caspian to Europe. The pipeline is planned to be prolonged to Płock in Poland, and from there through the existing branch off of the northern branch of Druzhba pipeline to Gdańsk. For developing this project, UkrTransNafta and Poland's pipeline operator PERN Przyjazn SA formed a joint venture Sarmatia sp.z.o.o. on 12 July 2004.

On 27 October 2006 at the European Union-Ukraine summit, the President of Ukraine Viktor Yushchenko proposed to build an extension via Slovakia to Kralupy refinery in the Czech Republic. On 15 November 2006, the idea was supported by Ukraine's prime minister Viktor Yanukovych.

On 11 May 2007 the presidents of Poland, Ukraine, Lithuania, Georgia and Azerbaijan, and the special envoy of the president of Kazakhstan agreed on the construction of a pipeline linking existing pipeline with Gdańsk.

On 5 June 2007, at the Gdańsk meeting the intergovernmental working group of the project agreed to expand the composition of shareholders of Sarmatia sp.z.o.o. by companies from Azerbaijan, Georgia and Lithuania. New shareholders since 2007 are Lithuania's Klaipedos Nafta, Georgian Oil and Gas Corporation (GOGC) and the State Oil Company of the Azerbaijani Republic (SOCAR). According to the agreements between the companies, Ukrtransnafta, PERN, SOCAR and GOGC will each own 24.75% of the shares, while Klaipedos Nafta will own 1% of shares.

On 10 October 2007, the agreement forming a pipeline consortium was signed by the presidents of Poland, Ukraine, Lithuania, Georgia and Azerbaijan at the energy security conference in Vilnius.

== See also ==
- Baku–Tbilisi–Ceyhan pipeline
- Trans-Balkan pipeline
- Intermarium
- Port of Taman
