= Kakha Baindurashvili =

Georgian politician

Minister of Finance of Georgia
- In office 6 February 2009 – 17 June 2011
- President: Mikheil Saakashvili
- Preceded by: Nikoloz Gilauri
- Succeeded by: Dimitri Gvindadze

Deputy Finance Minister
- In office December 2008 – 6 February 2009

Personal details
- Born: 26 September 1978 (age 47) Tbilisi, Georgian SSR, USSR
- Education: Tbilisi State University, Williams College
- Website: Government of Georgia

Kakha Baindurashvili (Georgian: კახა ბაინდურაშვილი) (born 26 September 1978) is a Georgian politician who was the country's Minister of Finance from 6 February 2009 to 17 June 2011.

== Early life ==
Born in Tbilisi, Kakha Baindurashvili (sometimes also "Kaha") earned a master's degree in economics at the Tbilisi State University in 2000 and master's degree in Economics from Williams College, Williamstown, Massachusetts, USA, in 2006. In 1999–2000, he worked as the editor of Prime News Agency. From 2000 to 2002, he was the Head of Investment Projects Monitoring Division at the Ministry of Finance of Georgia. From 2002 through 2004, he worked at the UNDP Project Office. From March 2004 to July 2005 he held a post of the Deputy Chairman of the Supervisory Board of Georgian Railway.

== Political career ==
Baindurashvili served as an advisor to the Prime Minister of Georgia from 2004 to 2005. He was appointed Chairman of the State Tax Department of the Ministry of Finance in 2006. From March 2007 to January 2009 he served as the First Deputy Minister of Finance. On 6 February 2009 he succeeded the Minister of Finance Nika Gilauri who in turn became the country's Prime Minister.

Among other reform measures, Baindurashvili oversaw Georgia issuing Eurobonds for the first time, in 2008, and again in 2011. Other reforms included introducing electronic declaration system for tax and customs' services. As four out of total five procedures were eliminated, customs examination process became shorter and more efficient. Under his leadership, Georgia managed to, relatively successfully, continue economic development despite major global and regional problems (the 2008 financial crisis & the Russo-Georgian War). GDP growth for the year 2010, a 6% increase, was better than the estimated 2%. Alongside important reforms, the Ministry was able to support allocating financial resources for a major restoration initiative for Georgian hospitals. These advancements are attributed to structural improvements, fiscal stabilization, as well as financial aid from international organizations.

On 17 June 2011 Gilauri announced that Baindurashvili was replaced by Dimitri Gvindadze, who had been serving as a Deputy Minister of Finances since 2005, and the former minister would become chairman of supervisory board of the state-owned Georgian Post, which originally was intended for privatization. In 2011, he was also elected as the President of the Georgian Chamber of Commerce and Industry.

== See also ==
- Cabinet of Georgia
