= Kakha Kaladze =

Georgian footballer and politician (born 1978)

- კახა კალაძე
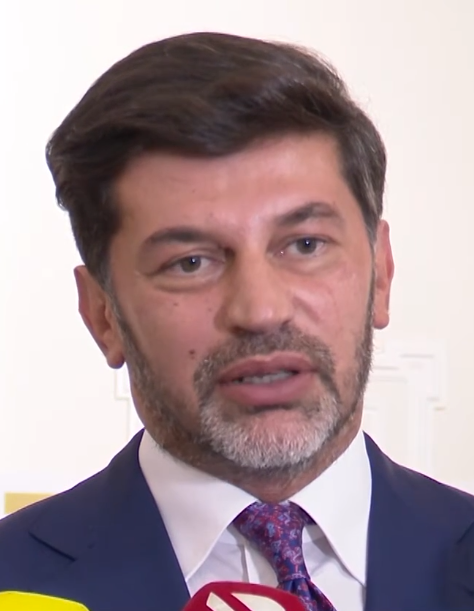
- Kaladze in 2021

10th Mayor of Tbilisi
- Disputed
- Assumed office 13 November 2017
- President: Giorgi Margvelashvili; Salomé Zourabichvili; Mikheil Kavelashvili
- Prime Minister: Giorgi Kvirikashvili; Mamuka Bakhtadze; Giorgi Gakharia; Maya Tskitishvili (acting); Irakli Garibashvili; Irakli Kobakhidze
- Preceded by: Davit Narmania

Deputy Prime Minister of Georgia
- In office 25 October 2012 – 12 July 2017
- President: Mikheil Saakashvili; Giorgi Margvelashvili
- Prime Minister: Bidzina Ivanishvili; Irakli Garibashvili; Giorgi Kvirikashvili
- Preceded by: Ekaterine Tkeshelashvili
- Succeeded by: Mikheil Janelidze

Minister of Energy
- In office 26 November 2016 – 10 July 2017
- President: Giorgi Margvelashvili
- Prime Minister: Giorgi Kvirikashvili
- Preceded by: Ilia Eloshvili
- Succeeded by: Ilia Eloshvili
- In office 25 October 2012 – 9 September 2016
- President: Mikheil Saakashvili; Giorgi Margvelashvili
- Prime Minister: Bidzina Ivanishvili; Irakli Garibashvili; Giorgi Kvirikashvili
- Preceded by: Vakhtang Balavadze
- Succeeded by: Ilia Eloshvili

Secretary General of Georgian Dream
- Incumbent
- Assumed office 24 November 2013

Personal details
- Born: Kakhaber Kaladze; 27 February 1978 (age 48) Samtredia, Georgian SSR, Soviet Union
- Party: Georgian Dream (2012–present)
- Height: 1.86 m (6 ft 1 in)
- Spouse: Anouki Areshidze (m. 2013)
- Children: Levan; Kakhaber Jr.; Vache; Nikola
- Parent(s): Karlo Kaladze; Medeya Kaladze
- Education: Tbilisi State University
- Occupation: Footballer (retired); Politician
Association football career
- Positions: Centre-back; left-back
Senior career*
Years	Team	Apps	(Gls)
1993–1998	Dinamo Tbilisi	82	(1)
1998–2001	Dynamo Kyiv	71	(6)
1998–2000	→ Dynamo-2 Kyiv	9	(1)
2001–2010	AC Milan	194	(12)
2010–2012	Genoa	53	(1)
Total		409	(21)
International career
1993–1994	Georgia U17	2	(0)
1995	Georgia U19	4	(0)
1995–1996	Georgia U21	3	(0)
1996–2011	Georgia	83	(1)
- * Club domestic league appearances and goals

Kakhaber "Kakha" Kaladze (Georgian: კახაბერ "კახა" კალაძე, pronounced [kʼaχabeɾ kʼaɫadzɛ]; born 27 February 1978) is a Georgian politician and former footballer who has served as the Mayor of Tbilisi since November 2017. A versatile player, he was capable of playing as both a centre-back and left-back, or even as a wide midfielder. He played for the Georgia national team from 1996 to 2011. He was voted Georgian Footballer of the Year in 2001–2003, 2006 and 2011 and was considered one of Georgia's most important players.

Kaladze started his football career in 1993 at Umaglesi Liga club Dinamo Tbilisi and made 82 appearances in a five-year spell. In 1998, he moved to the Ukrainian club Dynamo Kyiv and made 71 appearances until 2001, when he was signed by the Italian Serie A club AC Milan. He has won one Serie A, three Ukrainian Premier League and five Umaglesi Liga titles. With Milan, he won the Champions League on two occasions, the UEFA Super Cup once and the FIFA Club World Cup once. After captaining his country 50 times in 84 appearances, Kaladze announced his retirement from the Georgian national team on 11 December 2011.

Born in Samtredia, a town in the Imereti region, Kaladze comes from a footballing family as his father played for Lokomotiv Samtredia and was also president of the team for some time. His brother was kidnapped in a high-profile case in 2001 and officially declared dead in 2006, resulting in two men being sentenced to prison for a combined total of 30 years. Outside of football, he owns a company called Kala Capital and an organisation called Kala Foundation, as well as being an ambassador for SOS Children's Villages. He is married to Anouki Areshidze, with whom he has four children.

Kaladze became involved in the politics of Georgia as a member of the opposition Georgian Dream–Democratic Georgia party, founded by Bidzina Ivanishvili in February 2012. He was elected to the Parliament of Georgia on 1 October 2012 and approved as Deputy Prime Minister as well as Minister of Energy in Ivanishvili's cabinet on 25 October 2012. He continued to occupy both of these position under the succeeding cabinet of Giorgi Kvirikashvili until July 2017, when he resigned to run for the Mayor of Tbilisi as a Georgian Dream candidate in the October 2017 election, which he won with 51.13%. In 2021, he was reelected as the Mayor of Tbilisi, gaining 55.61% of the vote in the second round of the election. He was re-elected again during the 2025 Georgian local elections.

== Club career ==
=== Early career ===
Kaladze started his career playing as a striker for his local club Lokomotiv Samtredia, where his father was president, until former Georgia international footballer David Kipiani requested Kakha to join Dinamo Tbilisi. At Dinamo, he played in 82 domestic league games and scored one goal. He made his top-flight debut as a 16-year-old with Dinamo during the 1993–94 campaign. Kaladze claims that a good performance against Italy while playing for Georgia in a match that ended 0–0 brought him to the attention of Dynamo Kyiv; he later said, "In that game I was up against Christian Vieri and I marked him well."

A fee equivalent to €280,000 was enough to take him to the Ukrainian Premier League and Dynamo Kyiv in January 1998, where he signed a four-year deal. Here he scored six goals in 71 league games over the two-and-a-half seasons he spent there. The Ukrainian club had been under the ownership of Hryhoriy Surkis and the late Valeriy Lobanovskyi had just been installed as manager; they would go on to win eight consecutive league titles. Kaladze also appeared in both legs of the semi-final of the 1998–99 Champions League against Bayern Munich, which Dynamo Kyiv lost 4–3 on aggregate. En route to the semi-finals, they beat teams like Real Madrid, Barcelona and Arsenal. He won eight league titles in a row during his time at both Dinamo Tbilisi and Dynamo Kyiv.

=== AC Milan ===
On 10 February 1999, almost two years before his move to Milan would happen, Kaladze was part of the Dynamo Kyiv team that went to Italy for a mid-season friendly game against AC Milan, which at the time had been in the final stages of negotiations for the transfer of Andriy Shevchenko. As Dynamo won 2–1, it was Kaladze who scored the winner from a free kick with his left foot, which impressed the rossoneri management and put him onto the club's shortlist of potential signings for the team's defense.

In January 2001, Kaladze became the most expensive Georgian footballer in history when Milan paid €16 million to bring him to Italy. His burning desire to join one of the European top teams coincided with witnessing his teammate's near career-ending injury. Upon his arrival, Kaladze became a regular starter almost immediately, and played mostly as a left-sided defensive midfielder in 4–4–2 or 4–2–1–3 formations, particularly under caretaker coach Cesare Maldini. On 11 May 2001, Kaladze played from start to the final whistle in the historic 6–0 Derby della Madonnina victory for Milan over Inter, in which he assisted the fifth goal of the game scored by Andriy Shevchenko; Kaladze and Shevchenko, once teammates and regulars in the Dynamo Kyiv starting XI, celebrated the goal together as personally significant and gave each other a hug. However, on 17 June 2001, Kaladze opened the score in the eventual 2–1 away loss against Reggina yet refused to celebrate the goal as most of his thoughts were still with his brother, Levan, who had been kidnapped in Georgia just three weeks prior.

In the 2002–03 season, he returned to his original role of a defender (left-sided full back and center back), and made 46 appearances in all competitions, including 27 Serie A appearances. That year, Milan won the Champions League, where they beat Juventus on penalties in the final (despite Kaladze missing his penalty) and the Coppa Italia, where they beat Roma 6–3 on aggregate in the final. After Kaladze's double success, the Georgian postal service issued a special stamp bearing the player's image. He is the first Georgian player to win a Champions League title.

"I've always dreamed of playing for a top club abroad, but I could have stayed at Kyiv, picked up an injury and it would all have been over for me. That's why I asked Dynamo president Hryhorii Surkis to put me on the transfer list."

— Kakha Kaladze, upon leaving Dynamo Kyiv in relation to Gerasimenko's injury.

Kaladze was limited to just six league appearances and 11 total appearances in the 2003–04 season. In the next season, Kaladze played just 19 Serie A matches and five in the Champions League as Milan finished as runners-up in both competitions. He was an unused substitute in that season's Champions League final, where Milan lost on penalties to Liverpool after a 3–3 draw. He was said to be frustrated with his lack of first-team options and a move to Chelsea, in exchange for Hernán Crespo or for £4 million, was widely reported. Kaladze himself said, "I have agreed everything with the Chelsea management. Now it is necessary to wait for them to reach an agreement with Milan and I think I could become a Chelsea player next week." Chelsea opted to sign Asier del Horno instead. On 30 June 2005, Kaladze extended his contract with Milan until 2010 and again on 4 September 2006, this time until 2011. In 2005–06, an injury to Paolo Maldini meant that Kaladze was moved back into the centre of defence, his favoured position. Milan finished third that season, although they would have finished second if there were no 2006 Italian football scandal which resulted in a 30-point deduction.

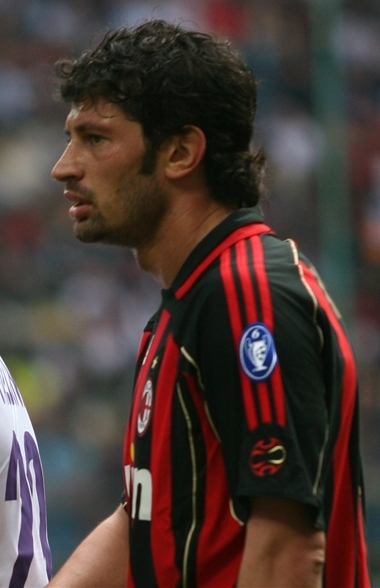
Kaladze with Milan in 2007

In the 2006–07 Serie A campaign, Kaladze scored a goal against Sampdoria which turned out to be his only goal of the season. Milan finished in fourth place with an eight-point deduction relating to the previous season's scandal. Kaladze won his second Champions League title on 23 May 2007 after Milan beat Liverpool 2–1 in the final; he came on as a 79th-minute substitute in that match. He later picked up the FIFA Club World Cup in December that year where Milan beat Boca Juniors 4–2 in the final, though Kaladze was one of two players to be sent off in that match. He had established himself as a first-team regular in the 2007–08 season, making 32 appearances, but had only featured sparingly in the 2008–09 season due to a knee ligament injury sustained in a UEFA Cup match against Zürich. Kaladze's performance on 15 February 2009 Milan derby was described as a "horror show" on the Channel 4 website which started a dispute over an alleged smear campaign between Kaladze and the Georgian newspaper Lelo, who used the quote, "Milan really does need a new centre-back after Kakha Kaladze’s horror show in the derby." Milan finished third in the league that season, ten points behind Serie A champions Inter Milan; Kaladze believed this was caused by the many injuries suffered by the Milan squad.

=== Genoa ===
On 31 August 2010, Kaladze signed with Genoa on a free transfer. In the 2010–11 season, he played 26 matches and scored one goal, which came against Parma on 30 January 2011. He was named as second-best defender of the 2010–11 Serie A by La Gazzetta dello Sport, being surpassed only by his former teammate, Milan's Thiago Silva. On 12 May 2012, Kaladze announced his retirement from football.

== International career ==
Kaladze won his first cap against Cyprus in a friendly match on 27 March 1996, coming on as a 72nd-minute substitute for Mikhail Kavelashvili. Later that year, he was sent off for the first time in his international career against Lebanon in a friendly match. With his team won Malta International Football Tournament 1998. He subsequently featured in his country's qualifying campaigns for the 1998, 2002, 2006 and 2010 FIFA World Cups, and the 2000, 2004 and 2008 UEFA European Championships. Georgia had never qualified for the FIFA World Cup or the UEFA European Championship since they split from the Soviet Union until their historic qualification for Euro 2024. Sadly, this tournament appearance was made long after Kaladze's retirement from football. His competitive debut was against Poland on 14 June 1997 in a 1998 World Cup qualifier; Georgia lost the match 4–1. Just two matches later, Kaladze was sent off for the second time playing for Georgia, along with Georgi Kinkladze, against Moldova in another 1998 World Cup qualifier. Georgia finished in fourth place in the group and failed to qualify. In qualifying for Euro 2000, Georgia finished at the bottom of the group (Group 2) in sixth place, with just one win. Kaladze occasionally captained the side during these qualifiers in the absence of Georgi Nemsadze.

The qualifiers for the 2002 World Cup ended with Georgia finishing in third place, ahead of Hungary and Lithuania. Kaladze played in all of the matches and often missed the friendlies in between. Kaladze only played in three matches during the Euro 2004 qualifiers, where Georgia finished in last place in the group. He did, however, feature in a 1–0 victory over neighbouring Russia, a victory considered to be one of Georgia's greatest successes. Kaladze played in all but one of the 2006 World Cup qualifying matches, where Georgia finished sixth in the group, with Kazakhstan being the only team to finish below them. He played fewer matches during the qualification for Euro 2008 and once again Georgia failed to qualify as they finished in sixth place despite starting their campaign with a 6–0 win over the Faroe Islands.

He scored his first ever international goal against Latvia on 6 February 2008 in a friendly which Georgia lost 3–1. On 5 September 2009, Kaladze scored two own goals in a 2010 World Cup qualifying match against Italy within the space of 11 minutes. The match ended 2–0 to Italy. Kaladze was the captain of the national team, until 11 December 2011, when he announced his retirement. The La Gazzetta dello Sport reporter and the president of International Sports Press Association, AIPS [Italian], Gianni Merlo said: "Kakha Kaladze is a man of the history of football in Georgia. In AC Milan he was a pillar of the defense and also a nice and polite man."

== Personal life ==
Kaladze started to learn both Ukrainian and Russian after his move to Dynamo Kyiv and quickly became fluent. He also speaks Italian and English.

On 23 May 2001, Kaladze's younger brother Levan, a medical student, was kidnapped in Georgia with a ransom of $600,000 demanded. Then-President Eduard Shevardnadze promised that "everything is being done to locate him". Despite this assurance, the only time that Levan was ever seen was in a video where he was shown blindfolded and begging for help. Following the kidnapping, Kaladze threatened to take up Ukrainian citizenship, but reverted his decision, stating, "There was a time when I thought about quitting the national side completely, but I couldn't do it out of respect for the Georgian people and the fans who come and give us such support." Roughly four years later, on 6 May 2005, Georgian police officers found eight dead bodies in the Svaneti region and it was speculated that Levan was among them. On 21 February 2006, Levan was officially identified among the deceased, after tests from FBI experts. The local media claimed that the ransom was paid by Kaladze's family, although another source says that Kaladze's father attempted to meet the kidnappers, who fled as they believed he was followed by the police. Two men were sentenced to prison for the murder, David Asatiani for 25 years and Merab Amisulashvili for five. On 14 July 2009, Kaladze's wife Anouki gave birth to their first-born son in Milan. The couple named their son Levan in memory of Kaladze's brother.

Kaladze has also been active in charitable causes and is a FIFA ambassador for the SOS Children's Villages. Through his Kala Foundation, a charitable organisation established in 2008, Kaladze raised €50,000 to benefit South Ossetian refugees during the Russian invasion of Georgia. Kaladze also plans to release an autobiography with the proceeds going to the Kala Foundation.

== Political career ==
=== Business ventures ===
Along with his football career, Kaladze is an investor in Georgia, Italy, Ukraine and Kazakhstan. Kaladze owns Kala Capital, an investment company established in 2008 in Georgia with a focus on energy businesses, and whose chief executive is former Georgian Prime Minister Zurab Noghaideli.

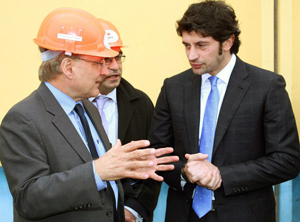
Kaladze (right) with the United States Ambassador to Georgia Richard Norland (left) in 2012

Kaladze's other businesses include the Buddha Bar in Kyiv that opened in 2008. Kaladze is also the owner of a restaurant called Giannino, founded in 1899 by Giannino Bindi, which is based in Milan. The restaurant has had a Michelin star under Davide Oldani and the chef in charge was Roberto Molinari.

Kala Capital owned 45 percent of the Georgia Hydropower Construction Company company SakHidroEnergoMsheni, a joint stock company incorporated in Georgia in 1998. His candidacy as Minister of Energy and Natural Resources in October 2012 was therefore overshadowed by concerns about a serious risk that a conflict of interests might arise. Reports on the same day indicated that Kaladze might refuse the energy portfolio or sell off his shares in Georgia Hydropower Construction Company within 10 days of his appointment.

=== Political office and conflict of interests ===
Kaladze became involved in the politics of Georgia as a member of the opposition Georgian Dream–Democratic Georgia party founded by billionaire Bidzina Ivanishvili in February 2012. He was elected to the Parliament of Georgia on 1 October 2012 as majoritarian of Samtredia constituency. He was approved as Deputy Prime Minister as well as Minister of Energy in the cabinet of Bidzina Ivanishvili on 25 October 2012. The appointment was met with skepticism in professional energy circles. More importantly, it stirred an intense debate on a conflict of interest arising from Kaladze's business interests in the Georgia Hydropower Construction Company, in which Kala Capital owned 45 percent. Kala Capital sold the shares to GMC Group in November 2012 but concerns whether his indirect commercial interests had been abandoned remain.

=== Mayor of Tbilisi ===
In July 2017, Kaladze resigned as Energy minister in order to run for Tbilisi mayor in the upcoming local elections. On 22 October, he was elected mayor as a candidate of Georgian Dream, winning the elections with 51% of the votes. He was sworn in on 13 November 2017.

Kaladze won reelection in 2021 with 55% of the vote. His second term expires after the 2025 election.

=== In sanctions list ===
On 5 December 2024, President Zelenskyy imposed sanctions against Bidzina Ivanishvili and his 18 associates, including Kaladze, amid a violent crackdown on participants of pro-EU protests. In response, Kaladze explained to media reporters the next day that "Zelenskyy does not belong to himself, the Ukrainian people and Ukraine as he serves another country".

On 15 December 2024, Lithuanian Foreign Minister Kęstutis Budrys announced sanctions against 17 Georgian Dream officials, Kaladze among them. On the same day, Estonia imposed a travel ban against 14 officials and judges with Kaladze also being in the list.

Тhe Ukrainian Ministry of Sport announced on 27 February 2025 that Kakha Kaladze had his title Маster of Sports of International Class revoked. This decision stemmed from a relevant presidential decree signed five days earlier which sanctioned 34 individuals in relation to the Russian invasion of Ukraine.

=== Controversy ===
Kaladze is known for his blunt language and manners. As he once revealed to reporters, "I never show restraint. Whenever I have to say something, I always express myself and never shy away regardless of how hard it is to see".

On 14 November 2019, while sitting in a car he showed his middle finger to participants of a rally at the Georgian Dream HQ, although in the same day he denied it being directed at protesters.

== Career statistics ==
=== Club ===
Appearances and goals by club, season and competition
Club	Season	League			National cup		Europe		Other		Total	
Club	Season	Division	Apps	Goals	Apps	Goals	Apps	Goals	Apps	Goals	Apps	Goals
Dinamo Tbilisi	1993–94	Umaglesi Liga	9	1			–		–		9	1
Dinamo Tbilisi	1994–95	Umaglesi Liga	23	0			–		–		23	0
Dinamo Tbilisi	1995–96	Umaglesi Liga	23	0			1 (Note: Appearances in UEFA Cup)	0	–		24	0
Dinamo Tbilisi	1996–97	Umaglesi Liga	12	0			4	0	–		16	0
Dinamo Tbilisi	1997–98	Umaglesi Liga	15	0			7 (Note: Appearances in UEFA Champions League and in UEFA Cup)	0	–		22	0
Dinamo Tbilisi	Total		82	1			12	0	–		94	1
Dynamo Kyiv	1997–98	Vyshcha Liha	13	2			–		–		13	2
Dynamo Kyiv	1998–99	Vyshcha Liha	25	3			12 (Note: Appearances in UEFA Champions League)	1	–		37	4
Dynamo Kyiv	1999–00	Vyshcha Liha	25	1			14	1	–		39	2
Dynamo Kyiv	2000–01	Vyshcha Liha	8	0			7	1	–		15	1
Dynamo Kyiv	Total		71	6			33	3	–		104	9
AC Milan	2000–01	Serie A	17	3	1	0	–		–		18	3
AC Milan	2001–02	Serie A	30	4	5	0	11	0	–		46	4
AC Milan	2002–03	Serie A	27	0	4	1	15	0	–		46	1
AC Milan	2003–04	Serie A	6	0	3	0	1	0	1	0	11	0
AC Milan	2004–05	Serie A	19	2	2	0	5	0	–		26	2
AC Milan	2005–06	Serie A	28	2	4	0	11	0	–		43	2
AC Milan	2006–07	Serie A	18	1	1	0	7	0	–		26	1
AC Milan	2007–08	Serie A	32	0	0	0	8	0	2 (Note: One appearance in UEFA Super Cup, one appearance in FIFA Club World Cup)	0	42	0
AC Milan	2008–09	Serie A	11	0	1	0	4	0	–		16	0
AC Milan	2009–10	Serie A	6	0	2	0	2	0	–		10	0
AC Milan	Total		194	12	23	1	64	0	3	0	284	13
Genoa	2010–11	Serie A	26	1	2	0	–		–		28	1
Genoa	2011–12	Serie A	27	0	1	1	–		–		28	1
Genoa	Total		53	1	3	1	–		–		56	2
Career total			400	20	26	2	109	3	3	0	538	27

=== International ===
Appearances and goals by national team and year
National team	Year	Apps	Goals
Georgia	1996	3	0
Georgia	1997	3	0
Georgia	1998	8	0
Georgia	1999	7	0
Georgia	2000	3	0
Georgia	2001	7	0
Georgia	2002	2	0
Georgia	2003	2	0
Georgia	2004	5	0
Georgia	2005	10	0
Georgia	2006	4	0
Georgia	2007	6	0
Georgia	2008	4	1
Georgia	2009	4	0
Georgia	2010	7	0
Georgia	2011	8	0
Total		83	1

Scores and results list Georgia's goal tally first.

#	Date	Venue	Opponent	Score	Result	Competition
1.	6 February 2008	Boris Paichadze Stadium, Tbilisi	Latvia	1–3	1–3	Friendly

== Honours ==
Dinamo Tbilisi

- Georgian League: 1993–94, 1994–95, 1995–96, 1996–97, 1997–98
- Georgian Cup: 1994, 1995, 1996, 1997
- Georgian Super Cup: 1996, 1997

Dynamo Kyiv

- Ukrainian Premier League: 1998–99, 1999–2000, 2000–01
- Ukrainian Cup: 1997–98, 1998–99, 1999–2000

Milan

- Serie A: 2003–04
- Coppa Italia: 2002–03
- Supercoppa Italiana: 2004
- UEFA Champions League: 2002–03, 2006–07
- UEFA Super Cup: 2003, 2007
- FIFA Club World Cup: 2007

Individual

- Georgian Footballer of the Year: 2001, 2002, 2003, 2006, 2011
- A.C. Milan Hall of Fame
- Source: Eurosport at Yahoo

== Electoral history ==
Election	Affiliation	First round			Second round		
Election	Affiliation	Votes	Percentage	Position	Votes	Percentage	Position
2017 Tbilisi Mayoral Elections	Georgian Dream	204,061	51.09%	1st			
2021 Tbilisi Mayoral Elections	Georgian Dream	216,344	45.01%	1st	258,776	55.61%	1st
2025 Tbilisi Mayoral Elections	Georgian Dream	215,363	71.63%	1st			
