= Transpetrol =

Transpetrol may refer to:

- Transpetrol AS, Slovakian oil pipeline operator
- Transpetrol Limited, Belgium based maritime company specialising in oil tankers
- Transpetrol GmbH, European rail transport company
