= Dimitri Gvindadze =

Georgian economist and politician

Dimitri Gvindadze დიმიტრი გვინდაძე

Minister of Finance of Georgia
- In office 20 June 2011 – 13 August 2012
- President: Mikheil Saakashvili
- Preceded by: Kakha Baindurashvili
- Succeeded by: Alexander Khetaguri

Deputy Finance Minister
- In office July 2005 – 20 June 2011

Personal details
- Born: 23 December 1973 (age 52) Tbilisi, Georgia
- Website: Government of Georgia

Dimitri Gvindadze (Georgian: დიმიტრი გვინდაძე) (born 23 December 1973) is a Georgian economist and politician who has been the country's Minister of Finance from 20 June 2011 to 13 August 2012.

== Education and early career ==
Born in Tbilisi, then-Soviet Georgia, Gvindadze graduated from the Tbilisi State Technical University with a degree in civil engineering in 1995. He then studied at the Diplomatic Academy of Paris (1998), International Institute of Social Studies in The Hague (2001), and the John F. Kennedy School of Government at Harvard University (2003–2005), and went through a Financial Programming and Policy course at the International Monetary Fund Institute (2007).

From 1994 to 2003, Gvindadze served on various positions at the Ministry of Foreign Affairs of Georgia. In July 2005, he was appointed Deputy Minister of Finance. He was in charge of foreign debt, cooperation with the international financial institutions and bilateral donors. When nominating Gvindadze to the post of Minister of Finance, the Prime Minister of Georgia Nika Gilauri noted that owing to Gvindadze's successful work as a Deputy Minister it was made possible to issue US$500 million eurobonds in April 2011 to refinance the previous one.

== Minister of Finance ==
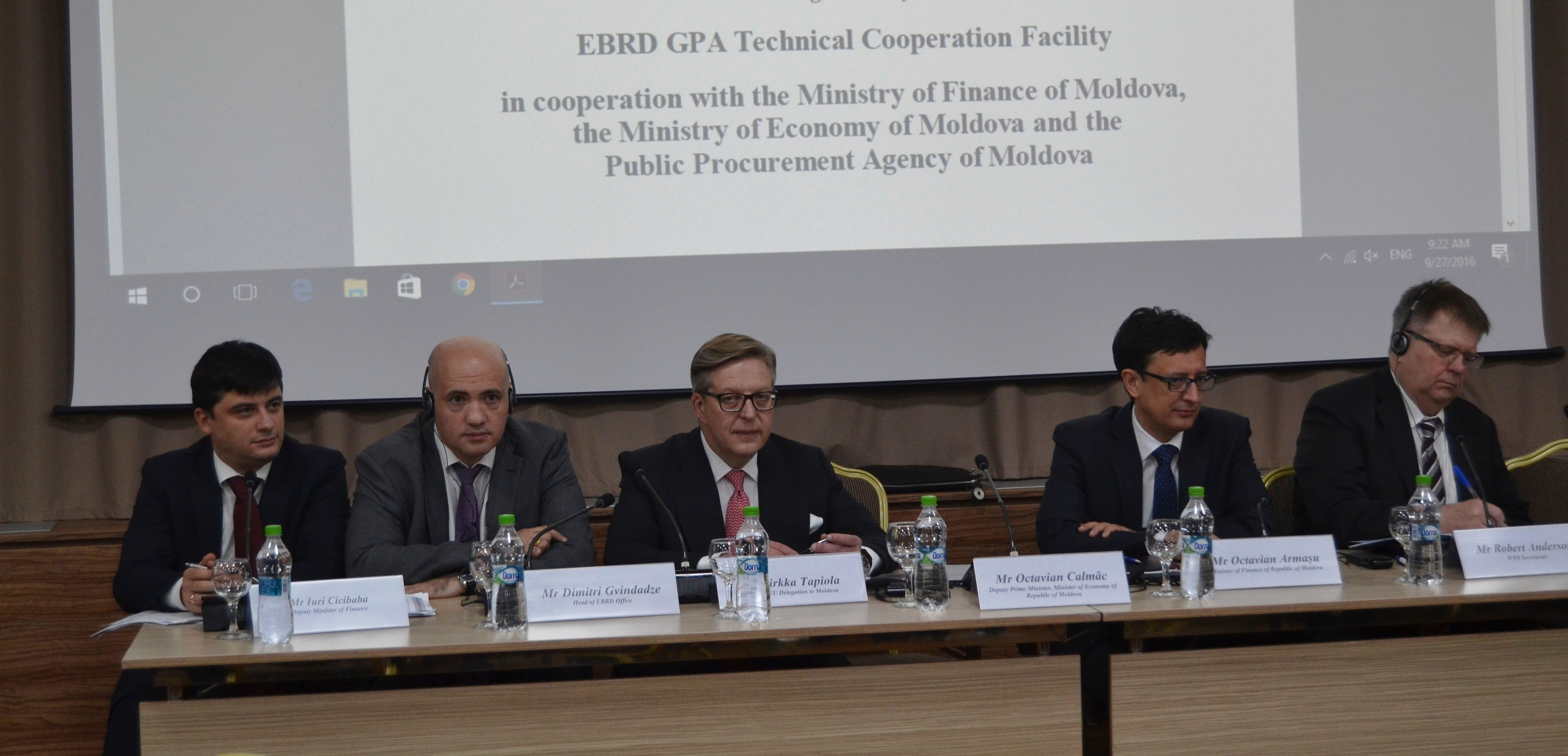
Gvindadze during an EBRD meeting in Chișinău with Moldovan finance minister Octavian Armașu among others, September 2016

Dimitri Gvindadze was appointed Minister of Finance on 20 June 2011, succeeding Kakha Baindurashvili. On 13 August 2012 he was, in turn, replaced with Alexander Khetaguri, hitherto Minister for Energy.

== See also ==
- Cabinet of Georgia
