= Vakhtang Balavadze =

Vakhtang Balavadze may refer to:

- Vakhtang Balavadze (wrestler)
- Vakhtang Balavadze (politician)
