= Aleksandre Khetaguri =

Georgian politician

Alexander Khetaguri

Minister of Finance
- In office 13 August 2012 – 25 October 2012
- President: Mikheil Saakashvili
- Preceded by: Dimitri Gvindadze
- Succeeded by: Nodar Khaduri

Minister of Energy of Georgia
- In office 30 August 2007 – 13 August 2012
- President: Mikheil Saakashvili
- Preceded by: Nikoloz Gilauri
- Succeeded by: Vakhtang Balavadze

Personal details
- Born: 5 August 1976 (age 49) Tbilisi, Georgia
- Website: Government of Georgia

Alexander Khetaguri (Georgian: ალექსანდრე ხეთაგური) (born 5 August 1976) is a Georgian politician who served in the cabinet of Georgia as the country's Minister of Energy from 30 August 2007 to 13 August 2012 and Minister of Finance from 13 August 2012 to 25 October 2012.

== Early life ==
Khetaguri was born in Tbilisi, Georgia on 5 August 1976. From 1993 to 1997, Khetaguri studied at Georgian Technical University graduating with a bachelor's degree in applied mathematics, computer systems and networks. He then studied at Tbilisi Business and Marketing Institute graduating with a master's degree in accounting and auditing. In 2000, he took courses in Gainesville, Florida on Regulation of Communal Facilities and Strategies (within the framework of the World Bank program) and in 2001, he took part in an international training course on Finances and Budget Development (within the framework of a USAID/AED program) in Portland, Maine. From 2000-2002 he studied at the Georgian Technical University and received his second master's degree cum laude, in energy management.

== Political career ==
In 1999-2000, he was the Head Specialist of the Economic Department of the Georgian National Commission on Energy Regulation. In 2000-2002 he worked as Chief Specialist of the Economic Department of the Georgian National Commission on Energy Regulation. In 2002-2004, Khetaguri worked as Director of the Department of Information Management and Methodology of the Georgian National Commission on Energy Regulation. In 2004, he was appointed the Deputy to the Minister of Energy of Georgia and in 2005 he was transferred to the position of the First Deputy Minister. In 2006-2007, Khetaguri was Director General of the Georgian Oil and Gas Corporation. On 30 August 2007 he was appointed the Minister of Energy of Georgia. He then served as Minister of Finance from 13 August 2012 to 25 October 2012.

Khetaguri is fluent in English and Russian.

== See also ==
- Cabinet of Georgia

Preceded by Nikoloz Gilauri	Minister of Energy of Georgia; 30 August 2007 – Present	Succeeded by Incumbent
