= Ministry of Finance of Georgia =

Government ministry of Georgia

- საქართველოს ფინანსთა სამინისტრო Sakartvelos Pinansta Saministro
- Coat of Arms of Georgia

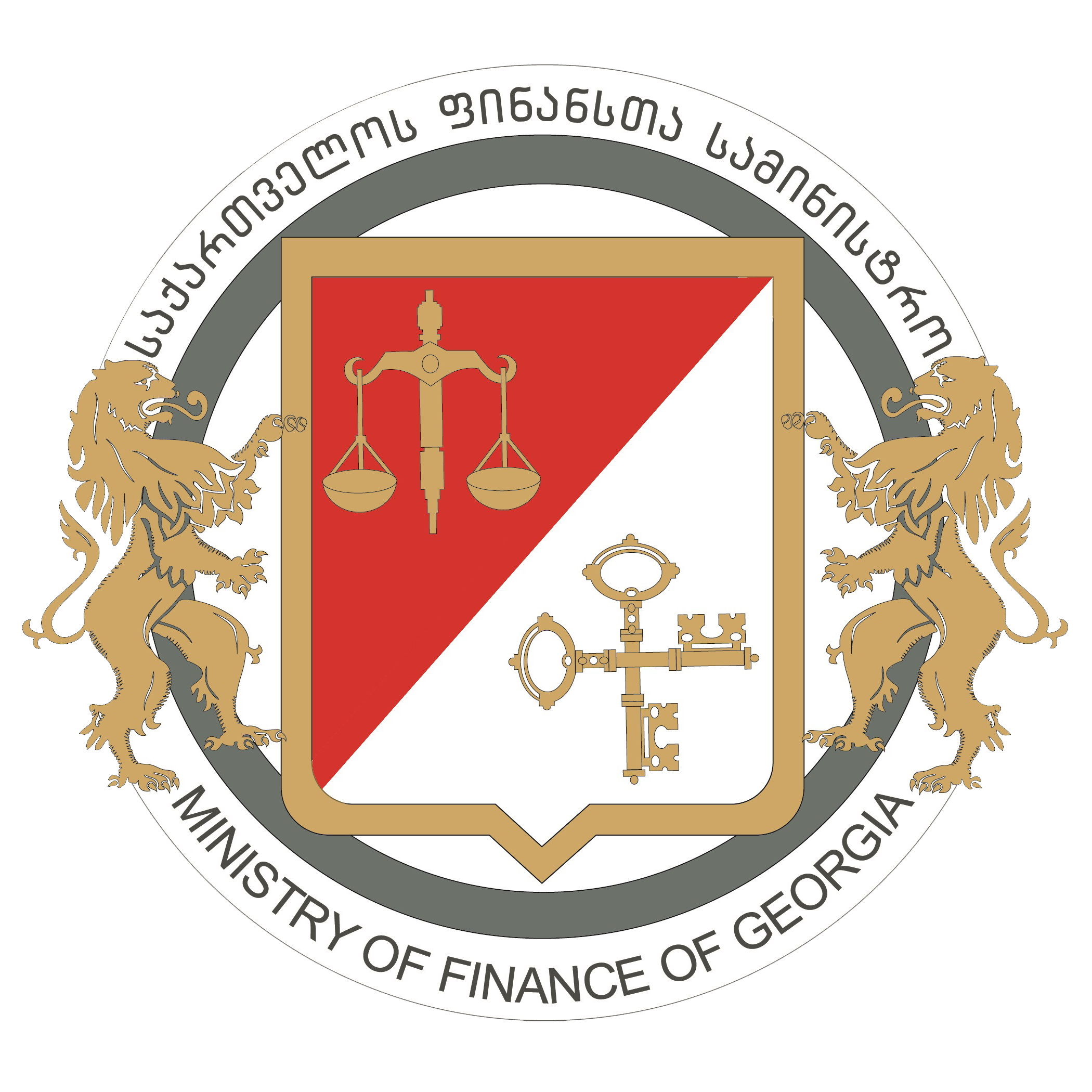
- Ministry logo

Agency overview
- Jurisdiction: Government of Georgia
- Headquarters: N16, V. Gorgasali str. Tbilisi, Georgia 0114
- Annual budget: ₾106 million (USD 39.9 million) (2023).
- Agency executive: Lasha Khutsishvili (1 April 2021–Disputed), Minister of Finance
- Website: www.mof.ge

The Ministry of Finance (Georgian: საქართველოს ფინანსთა სამინისტრო) is a governmental agency within the Cabinet of Georgia in charge of regulating the financial sector in the Republic of Georgia. Lasha Khutsishvili has served as the Minister since 1 April 2021.

== Structure ==
Main functions of the ministry is regulation of financial sector by ensuring sustainable economic development and financial stability; enforcing state policies on financial issues, budgeting and taxes; ensuring stability of state finances and development of financial markets in the country; attracting foreign creditors to Georgian economy; improvement of budgeting, tax forecasting, financial mechanisms; ensuring financial control over budgetary funds and spending; treasury development, revenue mobilization, provision of state budget funds management and controlling movement of funds within Georgia.

== Budget ==
The budget of the Ministry of Finance in 2023 is GEL 106 million (USD 39.9 million), up by GEL 596,000 (USD 224,521) compared to 2022.

== List of ministers of finance ==
- Guram Absandze, November 1990 – January 1992
- Parnaoz Ananiashvili, January 1992 – September 1993
- David Iakobidze, September 1993 – April 1997
- Mikheil Chkuaseli, May 1997 – November 1998
- David Onoprishvili, November 1998 – May 2000
- Zurab Noghaideli, May 2000 – November 2001
- Mirian Gogiashvili, November 2001 – November 2003
- Zurab Noghaideli, November 2003 – February 2005
- Valeriy Chechelashvili, February 2005 – June 2005
- Lekso Aleksishvili, June 2005 – August 2007
- Nika Gilauri, August 30, 2007 – February 6, 2009
- Kakha Baindurashvili, February 6, 2009 – June 17, 2011
- Dimitri Gvindadze, June 20, 2011 – August 13, 2012
- Alexander Khetaguri, August 13, 2012 – October 25, 2012
- Nodar Khaduri, October 25, 2012 – November 2016
- Dimitry Kumsishvili, November 22, 2016 – 13 November 2017
- Mamuka Bakhtadze, 13 November 2017 – 13 June 2018
- Nikoloz Gagua, 21 June 2018 – 12 July 2018
- Ivane Matchavariani, 12 July 2018 – 31 March 2021
- Lasha Khutsishvili, 1 April 2021 – Present (Disputed)

== See also ==
- Cabinet of Georgia
