= Grigol Mgaloblishvili =

Georgian politician and diplomat; former Prime Minister of Georgia

- გრიგოლ მგალობლიშვილი
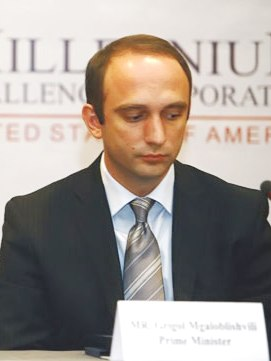
- Mgaloblishvili in 2008

Prime Minister of Georgia
- In office 1 November 2008 – 6 February 2009
- President: Mikheil Saakashvili
- Preceded by: Lado Gurgenidze
- Succeeded by: Nikoloz Gilauri

Ambassador Extraordinary and Plenipotentiary of Georgia to the Republic of Turkey
- In office 20 October 2006 – 28 October 2008

Personal details
- Born: 7 October 1973 (age 52) Tbilisi, Georgian SSR, Soviet Union
- Party: Independent
- Profession: Diplomat

Grigol Mgaloblishvili (Note: Georgian: გრიგოლ მგალობლიშვილი, pronounced [ɡɾiɡoɫ mɡaɫobliʃʷili]) (/ɡrɪˈɡɔːl məɡələblɪʃˈviːli/; born 7 October 1973) is a Georgian politician and diplomat who has been Georgia's Permanent Representative to NATO from 26 June 2009 to 2013. He briefly served as the prime minister of Georgia from 1 November 2008 to 6 February 2009.

== Early life ==
Grigol Mgaloblishvili was born in Tbilisi, the capital of the then-Soviet Georgia, to an academic family. He served as the Georgian Ambassador to Turkey until 27 October 2008 when President Mikheil Saakashvili proposed him for the position of the Prime Minister of Georgia to the Parliament of Georgia. Besides his native Georgian, he speaks English, Turkish, Russian and German.

== Prime minister ==
Mgaloblishvili was approved as the Prime Minister on 1 November 2008.

In December 2008, Russian media widely picked up a report by Georgia's tabloid Alia claiming that an incident occurred between Mgaloblishvili and Saakashvili in which the latter allegedly punched Mgaloblishvili and threw a telephone at him. The story did not explain what provoked the president. Shortly afterwards, Mgaloblishvili left for Germany for a medical examination. Returning to Georgia, he called the "hype and rumors" ridiculous. President Saakashvili also responded to the rumors, saying that after Mgaloblishvili's return "Russian will calm down and focus more on global issues."

On 30 January 2009, during a press conference, Mgaloblishvili announced his resignation citing health problems and saying that he had suggested the President to consider nominating Nika Gilauri, the finance minister and first vice premier, for the prime minister's position.

== Ambassador to NATO ==
On 26 June 2009, Mgaloblishvili was approved by the Parliament of Georgia as the country's Permanent Representative to NATO. He served until 2013.
