= UkrTransNafta =

UkrTransNafta (Ukrainian: УкрТрансНафта) is an open joint-stock company established by the government of Ukraine in June 2001. The company exists to manage oil transportation operations through the Ukrainian pipeline network. The company oversees the activities of two main oil pipeline systems: the Ukrainian section of the Druzhba pipeline, and the Pridniprovski oil pipeline. The company is also in charge of the Odesa–Brody pipeline.

== Mission ==
UkrTransNafta seeks to:

- promote the integration of Ukrainian oil pipelines into the European oil pipeline systems;
- promote business opportunities pertaining to the Ukrainian oil pipeline systems
- promote investment in the Odesa–Brody pipeline

== Pipeline system ==
UkrTransNafta's oil transportation system has a capacity of 110 million tons a year. The overall length of existing pipelines is 4,524 kilometres (2,810 mi). The pipeline system includes 40 pumping stations. Tank farm capacity is about 1 million cubic meters.

== Pricing policy ==
Since April 2023, Ukrtransnafta has decided to double (from 13.6 to 27.2 euros per ton) a fee for the transit of Russian oil to Hungary, Slovakia and the Czech Republic. The official reason is the need to restore the infrastructure destroyed by the war. However, Russian experts believe that in this way Ukraine is trying to force Hungary to abandon Russian oil.

== See also ==
- Druzhba pipeline
- Russia–Ukraine gas disputes
- Naftogas
