= Transneft Druzhba =

Transneft Druzhba (Russian: АО «Транснефть - Дружба», formerly known as Magistralnie Nefteprovodi Druzhba) is a subsidiary of Russia's leading oil transportation and export company Transneft. Transneft Druzhba owns a big network of pipelines within the Russian Federation and neighboring states. It is the main operator of Transneft in management of Druzhba pipeline activities.

The company was established in 1964 once Druzhba pipeline became fully operational. The pipeline network managed by Transneft Druzhba passes through Ukraine, Belarus, Poland, Czech Republic, Slovakia, Germany, Hungary, Latvia and Lithuania and crosses large rivers such as Volga, Oka, Dnieper, Dniestr, Visla, Danube, highways and railroads and Carpathian mountain range.

The overall length of the network is 8,900 kilometres (5,530 mi), 3,900 kilometres (2,420 mi) being within the borders of Russia. There are 46 pump stations, 38 intermediate pumping stations, crude storage reservoirs with capacity for 1.5 million cubic meters of oil. Four largest ones are Lopatino, Klin, Nikolskoe, Unecha.

The company employs nearly 4,000 people to oversee the operations of the network. Transneft Druzhba consists of three regional operation centers - Kuybishev, Michurinsk, Bryansk and maintains operations in 9 oblasts and 32 regions of Russia.

== See also ==
- Petroleum industry in Russia
- Druzhba pipeline
- GDANSK DRUZHBA PIPELINE N.V.
