= Ministry of Energy of Georgia =

Government ministry of Georgia

- საქართველოს ენერგეტიკის სამინისტრო
- Coat of Arms of Georgia

Agency overview
- Formed: 1991
- Dissolved: 2017
- Headquarters: Baratashvili 2, Tbilisi, Georgia 0105
- Annual budget: ₾135 million (2015)
- Agency executive: Elia Eloshvili, Minister of Energy
- Website: www.minenergy.gov.ge

The Ministry of Energy of Georgia (Georgian: საქართველოს ენერგეტიკის სამინისტრო, sakartvelos energetikis saministro) was a governmental agency within the Cabinet of Georgia in charge of regulating the activities in the energy sector of Georgia from 1991 to 2017.

== Structure ==
The ministry is headed by minister appointed by the President of Georgia. Five deputy ministers report directly to the minister. Main functions of the ministry are increasing capabilities for maximum exploitation of the available energy resources in the country and diversification of energy supply imported from other countries; improving and modernizing electricity supply by enhancing the hydropower capacity of Georgia; renovation of existing and construction of new power stations and natural gas transportation infrastructure; development of alternative energy sources; improvements of infrastructure for making the country a reliable transit point for regional energy projects, etc.

Due to improvements in recent years, Georgia has become a major exporter of electricity in the region, exporting 1.3 billion KWh in 2010. Hydropower stations of Georgia produce 80-85% of the electricity utilized within the country, the remaining 15-20% is produced by thermal power stations. According to the authorities, so far Georgia has been exploiting only 18% of its hydro resource potential.

== Ministers after 2000 ==
- David Mirtskhulava, 2000-2003
- Nika Gilauri, February 2004–September 2007
- Alexander Khetaguri, September 2007–August 2012
- Vakhtang Balavadze, August 2012–October 2012
- Kakha Kaladze, October 2012–July 2017
- Ilia Eloshvili, July 2017–December 2017

== See also ==
- Cabinet of Georgia
- Economy of Georgia
