= Ilia Eloshvili =

Georgian politician (1975–2022)

Minister of Energy of Georgia
- In office 12 July 2017 – 14 December 2017
- President: Giorgi Margvelashvili
- Prime Minister: Giorgi Kvirikashvili
- Preceded by: Kakha Kaladze
- Succeeded by: position abolished
- In office 9 September 2016 – 26 November 2016
- President: Giorgi Margvelashvili
- Prime Minister: Giorgi Kvirikashvili
- Preceded by: Kakha Kaladze
- Succeeded by: Kakha Kaladze

Personal details
- Born: 19 May 1975 Tbilisi, Georgian SSR, Soviet Union
- Died: 1 June 2022 (aged 47) Tbilisi, Georgia
- Education: Georgian Technical University

Ilia Eloshvili (Georgian: ილია ელოშვილი; 19 May 1975 – 1 June 2022) was a Georgian politician. He served as Minister of Energy from September to November 2016 and again from July to December 2017.

Eloshvili died in Tbilisi on 1 June 2022 at the age of 47.
