= Anouki Areshidze =

Georgian fashion designer

Anouki Areshidze (Georgian: ანუკი; stylized as ANOUKI; born Ana Areshidze, Georgian: ანა არეშიძე; 1 July 1989) is a Georgian fashion designer based in Tbilisi.

Areshidze studied at Istituto Marangoni and Accademia del Lusso in Milan.

Areshidze is married to the retired footballer and current mayor of Tbilisi, Kakha Kaladze. The couple have four children together. Their first son, Levan, was named after Kaladze's late brother, who was kidnapped and murdered in 2001.
