= Druzhba pipeline =

Oil pipeline from Tatarstan, Russia

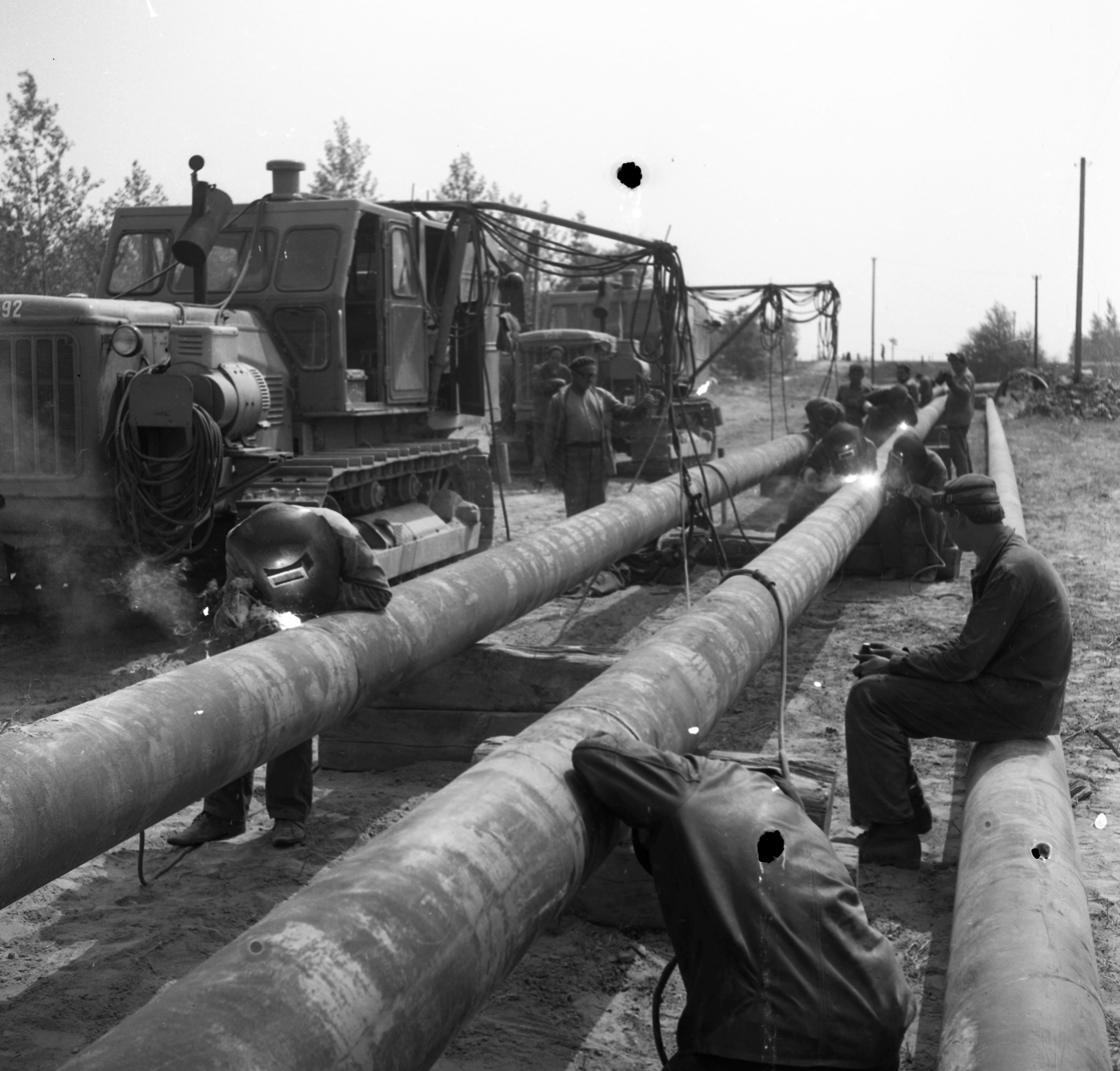

Location
- Country: Belarus, Russia
- Start: Almetyevsk
- To: Bratislava, Budapest, Gdańsk, Leuna, Prague, Rostock, Ust-Luga

General information
- Operator: Transneft, Gomeltransneft Druzhba, UkrTransNafta, PERN Przyjaźń SA, Transpetrol AS, MERO ČR, MOL

Technical information
- Length: 4,000 km (2,500 mi)
- Diameter: 1,020 mm (40 in)

The Druzhba pipeline (Russian: нефтепровод «Дружба», Czech: Ropovod Družba), also called the Friendship Pipeline and the Comecon Pipeline, is one of the world's longest oil pipelines and one of the largest oil pipeline networks in the world. It has been in operation since 1964. It carries oil over 4,000 kilometres (2,500 mi) from the eastern part of European Russia to points in Ukraine, Belarus, Poland, Hungary, Slovakia, the Czech Republic and Germany. The network also branches out into numerous smaller pipelines to deliver oil throughout Eastern Europe and beyond.

The name "Druzhba" means "friendship", alluding to the fact that the pipeline established friendly relations between the Soviet Union and Eastern Europe through reliable supply of oil. Today, it is the largest principal artery for the transportation of Russian and Kazakh oil across Europe.

In August 2025, as part of its war efforts during the Russian invasion of Ukraine, Ukraine's armed forces bombed two pumping stations of the pipeline, causing it to temporarily halt operations.

== History ==
On 18 December 1958, the 10th session of the Council for Mutual Economic Assistance (Comecon), held in Prague, adopted a decision and an agreement was signed on construction of a trunk crude oil pipeline from the USSR into Poland, Czechoslovakia, the GDR and Hungary. The construction of the initially proposed 5,327 kilometres (3,310 mi) long pipeline commenced in 1960. Each country was to supply all necessary construction materials, machinery and equipment. Czechoslovakia received first oil in 1962, Hungary in September 1963, Poland in November 1963, and the GDR in December 1963. The whole pipeline was put into operation in October 1964. The first oil pumped through the Druzhba pipeline originated from the oil fields in Tatarstan and Samara (Kuybyshev) Oblast. In the 1970s, the Druzhba pipeline system was further enlarged with the construction of geographically parallel lines.

Following the 2022 Russian invasion of Ukraine, the northern route to Germany was closed with Germany ceasing to buy oil in January 2023 and Russia ceasing to supply oil to Poland in February 2023. From December 2023, following agreements, Germany began importing 1.2 million tons of oil per year from Kazakhstan using the northern pipeline. In July 2024, the government of Ukraine stopped the transportation of Lukoil oil through the Druzhba pipeline to Slovakia and Hungary.

In April 2026, Russian Deputy Prime Minister Alexander Novak confirmed that Russia would stop the supply of Kazakh crude oil via the Druzhba pipeline to Germany from May 1, 2026. The oil flows primarily supply the PCK Schwedt refinery in eastern Germany, which plays a significant role in fuel distribution for Berlin and surrounding regions. According to industry reports, the decision would reduce available feedstock for the refinery.

== Route ==
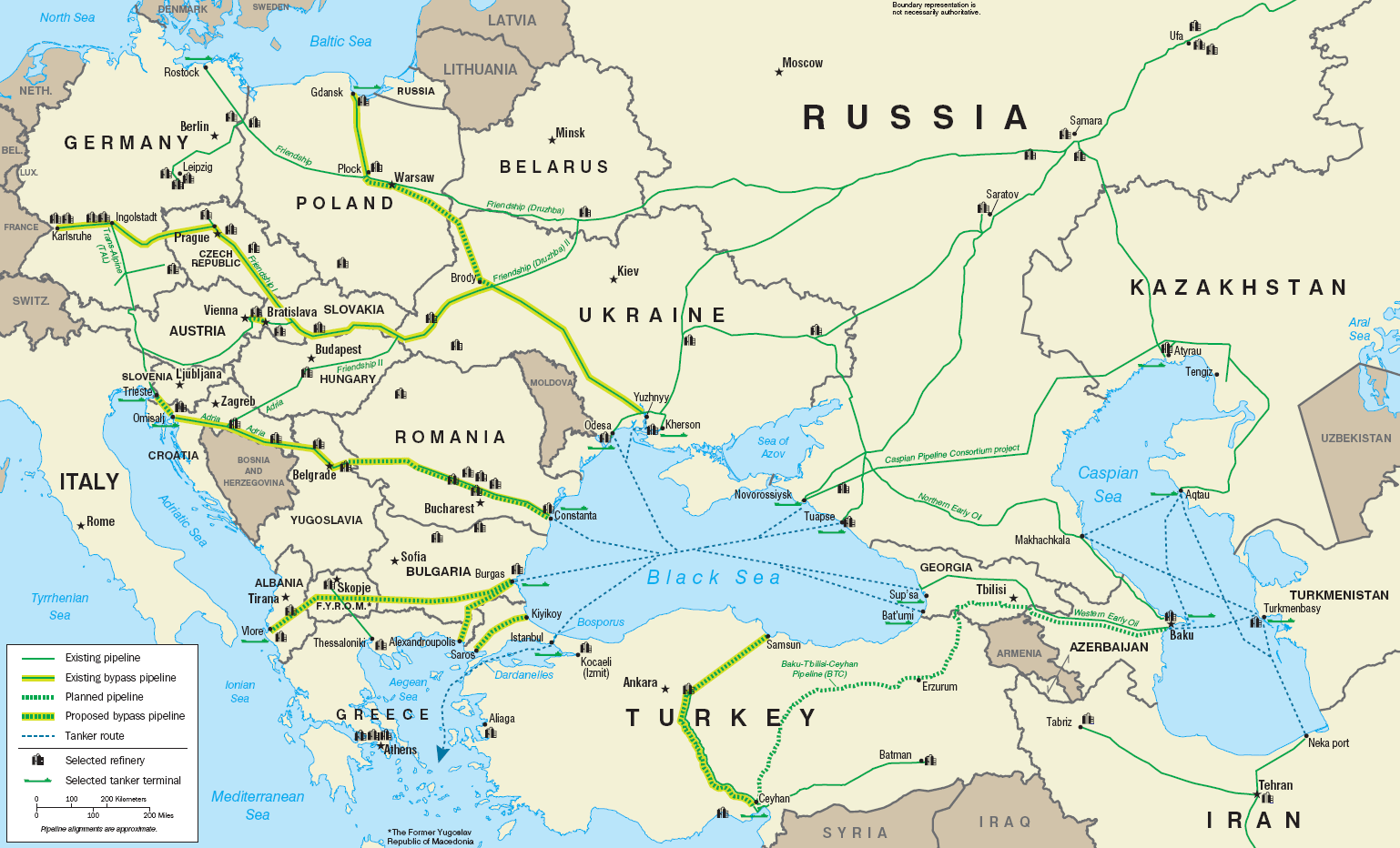
Druzhba pipeline map (the location of the port city of Pivdenne is approximate)

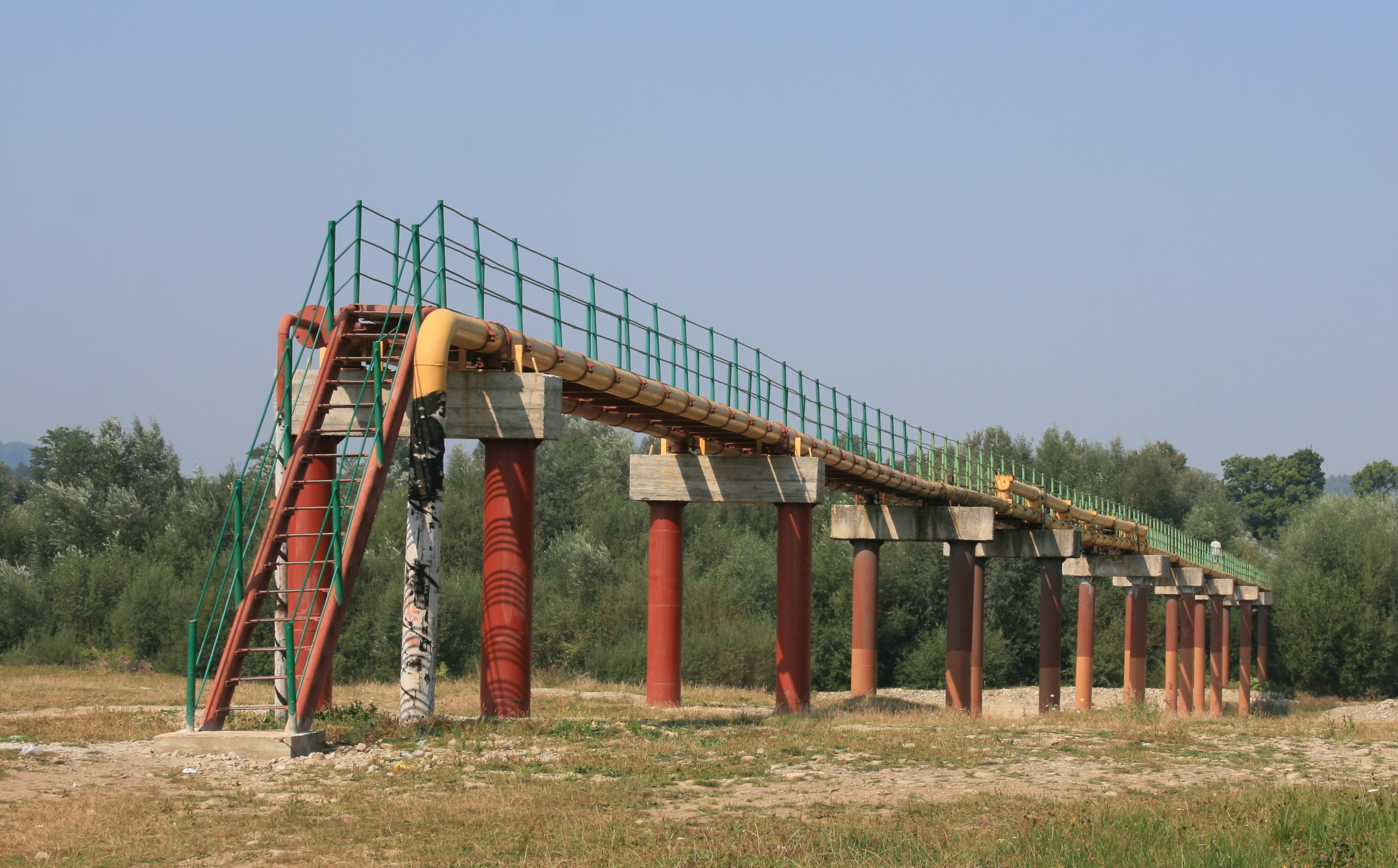
The pipeline above ground in Lviv region

The pipeline begins at Almetyevsk in Tatarstan, where it collects oil from western Siberia, the Urals, and the Caspian Sea. It runs to Mazyr in southern Belarus, where it splits into a northern and southern branch. The northern branch crosses the remainder of Belarus across Poland to Schwedt in Germany. It supplies refineries in Płock and in Schwedt. The northern branch is also connected by the Płock–Gdańsk pipeline with the Naftoport terminal in Gdańsk, which is used for oil re-exports. In Schwedt, the Druzhba pipeline is connected with the MVL pipeline to Rostock and Spergau. The southern branch runs south through Ukraine. In Brody, the Druzhba pipeline is connected with the Odesa–Brody pipeline, which is currently used to ship oil from the Druzhba pipeline to the Black Sea. In Uzhhorod, the pipeline splits into lines to Slovakia (Druzhba-1 — original Druzhba route) and to Hungary (Druzhba-2). The line through Slovakia is divided once again near Bratislava: one branch leading in a northwest direction to the Czech Republic and the other going southward to Hungary. The Druzhba-1 pipeline branches off toward Hungary in Banská Bystrica Region (Slovakia) near the river of Ipeľ, crosses the Hungarian border at Drégelypalánk and leads to Százhalombatta (not depicted on the map at the beginning of the page). In Hungary, the Druzhba-1 pipeline supplies the Duna refinery while Druzhba-2 supplies Duna and Tisza refineries.

The ORLEN Lietuva in Lithuania and Ventspils oil terminal in Latvia are connected to the main pipeline by the branch pipeline from the Unecha junction in Bryansk Oblast (not shown on the map). This branch ceased operation in 2006 and is not likely to become operational again any time soon.

The part of the Druzhba pipeline system which runs via Belarus is 2,910 kilometres (1,810 mi) long. The length of the pipeline in Ukraine is 1,490 kilometres (930 mi), in Poland 670 kilometres (420 mi), in Hungary 130 kilometres (80 mi), in Lithuania 332 kilometres (206 mi), in Latvia 420 kilometres (261 mi), and in Slovakia and in the Czech Republic together around 400 kilometres (250 mi). The pipeline crosses 45 major rivers as well as 200 railways and highways.

=== Baltic Pipeline System-2 ===
The Baltic Pipeline System-2 (BPS-2) is a pipeline from the Unecha junction of the Druzhba pipeline near the Russia–Belarus border to the Ust-Luga oil terminal at the eastern part of the Gulf of Finland with a 172 kilometres (107 mi) long branch line to Kirishi oil refinery. The throughput capacity of BPS-2 is 50 million tonnes of oil annually. The construction of the BPS-2 started on 10 June 2009. The BPS-2 was completed in 2011 and began to function in late March 2012.

== Technical features ==
The pipes for the project were manufactured in the Soviet Union and Poland, while fittings were manufactured in Czechoslovakia. The GDR was responsible for pumps, and Hungary for automation and communication equipment. The construction cost nearly 400 million rubles and nearly 730,000 tons of pipe was laid throughout the path of the pipeline. The Druzhba pipeline currently has a capacity of 1.2 to 1.4 million barrels per day (190×10^{3} to 220×10^{3} m^{3}/d). Work is currently underway to increase this in the section between Belarus and Poland. The pipe diameter of the pipeline varies from 420 to 1,020 millimetres (17 to 40 in). It uses 20 pumping stations.

== Operators ==
The Russian part of the pipeline is operated by the oil company Transneft through its subsidiary Transneft Druzhba. The operator in Belarus is Gomeltransneft Druzhba, in Ukraine UkrTransNafta, in Poland PERN Przyjazn SA, in Slovakia Transpetrol AS, in the Czech Republic Mero, and in Hungary MOL.

== Proposed extensions ==
Druzhba Adria

The Druzhba–Adria Pipeline Integration Project was a proposal that was considered in the 2000s to extend the pipeline to pass through Hungary and Croatia to reach the Adriatic Sea at the deep-water port of Omišalj. In the first phase, the Croatian portion of the Adria pipeline would be reconstructed from the Sisak pumping station to Omišalj harbour. The Croatian company JANAF was responsible for the design of the initial project phase, to reverse the phases of the Adria pipeline (which currently carries oil from the port inland) on the Sisak-Omišalj portion.

It was also proposed to connect Druzhba Adria with the planned Pan-European Pipeline.

The proposal was touted by the Croatian president Stipe Mesić, but it also garnered a lot of negative press due to complaints from the environmentalist groups such as Eko Kvarner, and was eventually abandoned.

Schwechat–Bratislava Oil Pipeline

The Schwechat–Bratislava two-way oil pipeline project was proposed in 2003. It would allow to supply the OMV owned Schwechat Refinery from the Druzhba pipeline.

== Controversies ==
=== 2009 parallel disputes on transit fees ===
In the 2000s, Russia and Ukraine were tied up in transit fee disputes as the major pipelines supplying Europe with Russian oil and gas ran through Ukraine. The continuous disputes were primarily based on the transit of natural gas. On 28 December 2009, referring to Russia's announcement, the Slovakian government said Russia issued warnings that it would stop oil supplies to Slovakia, Hungary and the Czech Republic over a transit fees dispute with Ukraine. However, the next day, Ukraine's Naftogas issued a statement confirming that Russia agreed to a 30% increase in the transit fees through Ukraine. The tariff rose from $7.8 to $9.50 (or €6.6) per tonne of oil transiting Ukraine through in 2010, and this was implemented due to the decision from Russia to raise the prices of energy resources. Additionally, unlike previous payments, new payments were to be made in Euros, as this was one of Ukraine's demands. Also, Ukraine stated that it needed substantial investments to update the network on its territory as the pipeline had aged. Russia and Ukraine also agreed on the volume of oil to be transported through Ukraine in 2010. The overall amount of oil to be transported to Slovakia, the Czech Republic and Hungary through Ukraine in 2010 was set at 15 million tonnes, a decrease from 17.1 million tonnes in 2008.

=== 2019 oil contamination scandal ===
The delivery of oil was halted on 20 April 2019 due to high concentrations of organic chloride found in the pipeline. These chemical compounds contaminated the pipeline and equipment in Russia and Europe causing an economic impact of billions of dollars. Investigation into the scandal is ongoing with individuals being detained in Russia suspected of having stolen oil and pouring in organochloride to the pipeline to cover up the theft.

Disputes over payment for contaminated oil were ongoing a month later.

By late May, a month after the contamination was discovered, Russia agreed to take back some of the 8-9m tons of contaminated oil remaining in the pipeline.

Estimates of overall contaminated stock, including that still in the pipeline and other stock pumped to tankers or to storage range from 20-40m tons as of end May. This stock will all require dilution before it can be refined.

In mid-September 2019, almost five months after the contamination was noticed, the Polish pipeline operator confirmed their section of the pipeline had been cleared of contamination and was operating normally. 450,000 tons of contaminated oil had been moved to storage.

Also in September 2019, oil companies BP and Total were trying to sell 2.3m barrels (over 300,000 tons) of tainted oil that they had received earlier from the pipeline.

=== 2020 Belarus–Russia ===
In February 2020, Belarus threatened to take oil from the Druzhba pipeline if Russia did not supply it with the required volumes of crude oil. As of February 2022, Russian oil supplies to Belarus had not been agreed to for 2020 and shipments had dwindled to 500,000 tonnes, down from a previously planned 2 million tonnes. Belarusian president Alexander Lukashenko said Moscow hinted at an energy supply deal in exchange for Belarus merging with Russia, which caused talks to collapse.

== Attacks ==
=== 2023 comment on possible sabotage of pipeline ===
In 2023, apparent classified U.S. intelligence documents released in the 2022–2023 Pentagon document leaks included a note of a conversation between the President of Ukraine and Deputy Prime Minister Yulia Svyrydenko in which Volodymyr Zelenskyy suggested blowing up the Druzhba pipeline to hit Hungarian industry, as Orbán's government was too friendly towards the Kremlin during the Russo-Ukrainian War.

=== 2025 ===
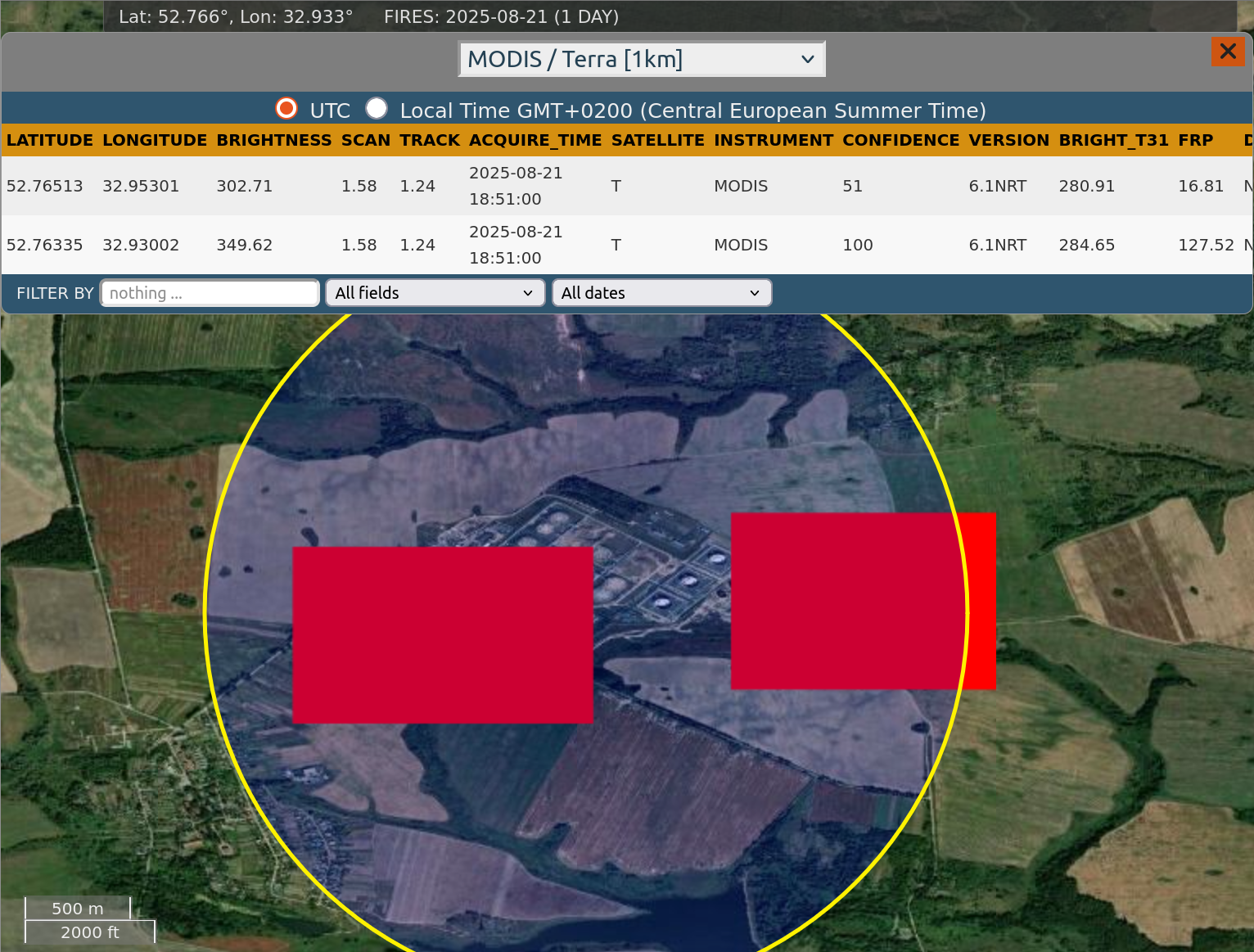
NASA's FIRMS detected fire on 21 August 2025 at the Unecha hub and pumping station of the Druzhba pipeline

In 2025 Ukraine attacked the pipeline several times. On 12 August 2025, Ukrainian drones attacked the Unecha junction and pumping station of the Druzhba pipeline in Bryansk Oblast, Russia causing fire detected by NASA's FIRMS. Five days later the General Staff of the Ukrainian Armed Forces announced that their UAVs had struck the Nikolskoye pumping station of the Druzhba pipeline, documented with satellite imagery from NASA's FIRMS. This second strike reportedly caused a complete halt of the Druzhba pipeline. On 21 August Ukrainian drones again attacked the Unecha hub and pumping station, again causing a halt of operations of the pipeline.

Slovakia and Hungary appealed to the European Commission to stop Ukraine's strikes on the pipeline. However, the Commission did not directly condemn Ukraine for the attacks and did not call the strikes unacceptable.

=== 2026 ===
On 27 January 2026, according to Ukrainian authorities, a Russian attack on the pipeline infrastructure running through Ukraine (Southern Druzhba or Druzhba-2 pipeline) halted deliveries of Russian oil and left Hungary and Slovakia facing shortages, since they relied on the pipeline for most of their oil supply. 22 days later, Slovakia declared a state of emergency in the oil sector. Both countries were the only ones in the European Union still buying Russian oil, since they got an exemption from the US sanctions banning the imports of Russian oil.

Hungary and Slovakia accused the Ukrainian authorities of deliberately delaying repairs for political reasons and, on 18 February, suspended diesel fuel supplies to Ukraine. In response, the European Commission called an extraordinary meeting of its Oil Coordination Group. Hungary also announced it would block a €90 billion EU loan to Ukraine until the resumption of oil supplies to the country via the Druzhba pipeline. On 21 February, Slovakia warned it would cut its electricity supply to Ukraine within two days if Ukraine didn't resume delivering oil through the pipeline; Hungary had made a similar threat some days earlier. On 22 February, Hungary threatened to block the European Union's 20th package of sanctions against Russia. Meanwhile, Ukraine is offering the EU the possibility of receiving oil via the Odesa-Brody route.

In the Brussels EU meeting of foreign ministers on 23 February, both Hungary and Slovakia blocked the EU's 20th package of sanctions against Russia, which would have required unanimity to be approved. Hungary also blocked a €90 billion loan for Ukraine's defense and reconstruction, a package also requiring unanimous EU approval. As announced, on this day Slovakia halted the supply of electricity to Ukraine. Ukraine relied on Slovakia and Hungary for about 68% of its imported electricity at the time.

Ukraine reacted to the Hungarian and Slovak actions by destroying a pumping station deep in Russia (in Tatarstan) through an attack with drones, shutting down the operation of a critical transit node in the Druzhba pipeline system. On March 25 Prime Minister Viktor Orbán said that Hungary would gradually suspend gas supplies to Ukraine until Russian oil deliveries through the Druzhba pipeline resumed.

Ukraine's President Volodymyr Zelenskyy stated he would prefer not to repair the Druzhba pipeline. Slovakia's policy of selling fuel at different prices to residents and non-residents has provoked potential enforcement action (failure to fulfill an obligation) by the European Commission.

In March, the European Commission organized a technical inspection mission to Ukraine to assess the condition of the Druzhba pipeline. Initially the mission faced Ukrainian refusals due to security concerns, but Kyiv agreed on 17 March. The following day, a group of EU experts arrived in Kyiv; however, despite waiting several days, they were denied access by Ukrainian authorities citing ongoing technical security procedures and risks of Russian attacks, preventing the inspection from proceeding fully by late March.

On 14 April, after the 2026 Hungarian parliamentary election, Zelenskyy said the Druzhba pipeline will be repaired by the end of April. Meanwhile, Slovak Foreign Minister Juraj Blanár is insisting on a guaranteed pipeline reopening.

Zelenskyy announced on the 21 April that oil flow through the Druzhba pipeline was ready to resume after Ukrainian authorities had completed repair work on the damaged section. However, he warned that no one could guarantee there would not be more Russian attacks on the pipeline in the future, perhaps to try to instigate another clash between Ukraine and Slovakia or Hungary. Zelenskyy noted that he hopes the European Union would now release a 90 billion euro loan that had been previously blocked by Viktor Orbán, Prime Minister of Hungary at the time, due to Ukraine's apparent unwillingness to repair the pipeline. Ukraine restarted oil flow in the pipeline on Wednesday, 22 April.

In May, according to Reuters, citing three industry sources, oil supplies to Hungary and Slovakia via the Druzhba pipeline returned to normal levels.

== In popular culture ==
Druzhba pipeline construction is shown in Countermeasure, filmed by Odesa Film Studio in Ukraine. The movie is based on a true story about pipeline construction involving political and business situation in Europe and the Soviet Union during the Cold War when the Soviet Union was pushing ideology by helping the occupied countries of Eastern Europe. Extra-large pipes were initially to be made in Germany with financing from major banks. However, economic and political forces of Europe clashed with the interests of the United States, because the Americans objected the construction of Druzhba pipeline. The film also shows a Ukrainian businessman (based on a real person, Yakov Osadchiy from Kryvyi Rih who is not related to president Zelenskyy who is interestingly also from Kryvyi Rih in the Southern Ukraine) managed to overcome all difficulties and produced piping for Druzhba pipeline.

== See also ==
- Yamal–Europe pipeline
- Urengoy–Pomary–Uzhhorod pipeline
- Russia–Ukraine gas disputes
- Russia–Belarus energy dispute
- Baku–Tbilisi–Ceyhan pipeline – the next longest oil pipeline after Druzhba
- Petroleum industry in Russia
- 2025 Slovak–Ukraine gas dispute
