= Lekso Aleksishvili =

Georgian politician and businessman

Aleksi Aleksishvili
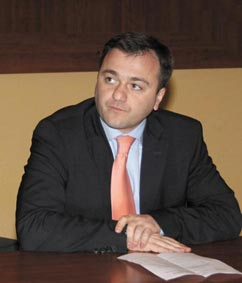

Chairman of the Board, PMCG
- In office December 2007 – Incumbent

Minister of Finance of Georgia
- In office June 2005 – September 2007
- Preceded by: Valeriy Chechelashvili
- Succeeded by: Nika Gilauri

Minister of Economic Development of Georgia
- In office December 2004 – June 2005

Chairman of UN Commission for Sustainable development
- In office 2005–2006

Personal details
- Born: February 21, 1974 (age 52) Tbilisi, Georgia
- Website: www.pmcg.ge

Alesko Aleksishvili (Georgian: ალექსი ალექსიშვილი; born 21 February 1974) is a Georgian politician and businessman. He is chairman of the board, Policy and Management Consulting Group, PMCG.

== Early life ==
Aleksi Aleksishvili was born in Tbilisi, Georgia, in 1974. He graduated from the faculty of Economics, Iv. Javakhishvili Tbilisi State University in 1996. In 2004 he graduated from Duke University in Durham, North Carolina, US, with a Master of Arts in International Development Policy, Public Finances and Management. In June 2004, he was awarded the Certificate for the Successful Completion of the E.S. Muskie Graduate Fellowship Program, The US Department of State, Washington, DC, US.

== Career ==
Aleksishvili was elected chairman of UN Commission for Sustainable development in 2005–2006. During his chairmanship, the 14th session of the UN CSD focused on progress in Energy for Sustainable Development, Climate Change, Air Pollution and Industrial Development.

=== Government ===
While working as a Minister of Finance of Georgia, Aleksishvili successfully implemented reforms in Public Finance, Tax and Customs Policy and Administration, Economic Deregulation and Liberalisation domains. Georgia was ranked by the World Bank “Doing Business” survey as the world's #1 reformer country in 2005–10. During this period (2004–2007), Georgia improved from 132nd place to 18th in the ranking of “Ease of Doing Business” by the World Bank. He conducted Tax and Customs reforms: reducing the number of taxes from 22 to 7 and reducing the national tax burden from 45% to 27% of GDP, while increasing tax compliance rate from 13% to 25% of GDP. He introduced one of the simplest tax systems in the region. Foreign Direct Investment increased from 250 m USD in 2004 to 2,100 m USD in 2007. GDP growth rate was more than 9% each year.

=== Business ===
In December 2007 Aleksishvili became chairman of the board, Policy and Management Consulting Group (PMCG). From February–December 2008 he was on the board of Kala Capital LLC, an investment company, where supervised the establishment of Progress Bank JSC. from September 2007-March 2008, he supervised monetary and financial policy implementation as a board member of National Bank of Georgia. In June 2010 he was a panelist and presenter at the regional meeting “Introduction to Identification and Management of Financial Risks for Energy Projects”, Vienna, Austria, organised by International Atomic Energy Agency. He was panelist and presenter at Eurasia Emerging Markets Forum, Thun, Switzerland.

== Memberships ==
- March 2008 –: International Chamber of Commerce (ICC) – Georgia, Board Member
- May 2000 – April 2001: “Transparency International – Georgia”, Member of the Board
- September 1997 – October 2000: AIESEC Georgia, President of National Committee
- August 1995 – June 1997: International Organization "Fair Elections", Board Member
- April 1991 – : Association of Young Economists of Georgia. President – 1994–2001.

== Publications ==
- April 2004 - "Tax Policy and Public Finance Management in Georgia,1995-2003"
- April 2000 - “Licensing System and Business Regulations in Georgia”. Published by USAID and AMEX International Inc
- June 1999 - "Comments on Taxation Code and Policy". Bulletin of Georgian Centre of Strategic Research and Development
- April 1999 - "Education System and Problems in Georgia". Bulletin of Georgian Centre of Strategic Research and Development
- August 1998 - "Foreign Economic Policy of Georgia", Bulletin of Association of Young Economists.
- June 1998 - “Economic Reforms and International Organisations in Georgia”. Newspaper: “Resonance”
- August 1997 - “Economic Situation in Ninotsminda Region, Georgia”, ISAR Publications
- May 1996 - “Monetary Policy in Georgia”, Tbilisi State University Press
- September 1996 - “Social-Economic Processes in South Osetia (Georgia)”, TACIS Publications.

== Recognition ==
- November, 2007- Certificate of Appreciation for Commitment to Making Georgia Open for Business. Business Climate Reform (BCR), US International Development Agency
- June, 2004- Certificate for the Successful Completion of the E.S. Muskie Graduate Fellowship Program, The US Department of State, Washington, DC, USA. October, 2000 - Certificate on the award of the U.S. Embassy's Democracy Commission Grant for the project entitled “Development of the Local Self-Governments in Georgia”.
- September 2000- “Training for Trainers Working in Central and Eastern Europe”, European Youth Center/ Council of Europe. September 1996- Certificate of Achievement. Training Course in International Trade, The US Information Service Agency.
