= Transpetrol AS =

Transpetrol A.S.
- Company type: joint stock
- Industry: Petroleum
- Founded: 1954
- Headquarters: Bratislava, Slovakia
- Key people: Predstavenstvo spoločnosti tvoria: Martin Ružinský (predseda), Marek Zálom (podpredseda),,,,
- Services: storage, pipeline transportation
- Revenue: US$ 100 million (2006)
- Number of employees: 369 (2006)
- Website: www.transpetrol.sk

Transpetrol is a Slovak company involved in the transportation and storage of crude oil. It provides both transit and domestic transport to the end customer.

The Slovak Republic owns through the Slovak Economy Ministry 100% of the company.

Transpetrol is the operator of the Slovak section of the Druzhba pipeline and it is the only operator of the oil pipeline system in Slovakia.

== Statistics ==
, the company transported a total of 11,145,000 tonnes of crude oil.

- 5,660,000 tonnes to Slovnaft;
- 5,218,000 tonnes to refineries at Litvínov and Pardubice in the Czech Republic;
- 267,000 tonnes to other companies.

Besides transporting oil, Transpetrol is also involved in the storage of oil having a total storage capacity about 1 000,000 m3.^{3}

== Corporate governance ==
Transpetrol is under the current management since 17 October. The company's board of directors consists of: Martin Ružinský (chairman), Marek Zalom (vice-chairman), David Kaiser, and Karol Ladomersky.

== See also ==
- Energy in Slovakia
- Economy of Slovakia
