= Georgian Post =

Post agency serving Georgia (the country)

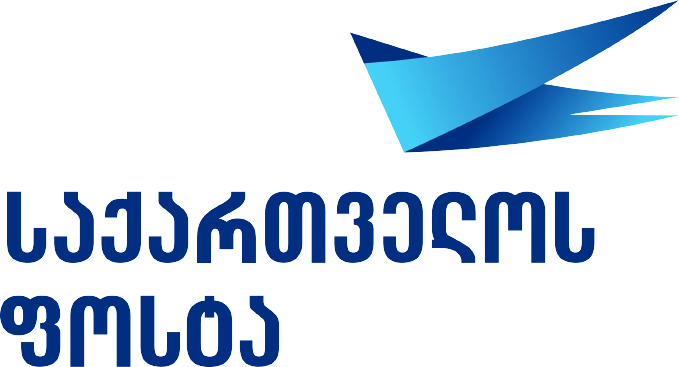
- Type: Ltd
- Headquarters: Station Square 2, 0100 Tbilisi, Georgia
- Number of employees: 2700
- Website: gpost.ge

Georgian Post (Georgian: საქართველოს ფოსტა, romanized: sakartvelos post'a) is a Georgian courier delivery services company. The Georgian Post represents a leading national postal operator that is mainly involved in providing the consumers with the universal postal services.

== History ==
The postal service in Georgia has a long history. Since ancient times, the news were transferred rapidly across the country through couriers and messengers mentioned in Kartlis Tskhovreba (lit. 'Life of Kartli'). By the end of the 19th century, an important representative of the Georgian economical thought, Ioane Batonishvili, who created the bill of State’s order reform, thought that arranging postal stations would be rather beneficial for the people and provide income for the Treasury. Trade could not have been expanded without postal services, so he demanded that post was established, and postal institutions were created. He wrote: “Posts are to be located in three regions: Kartli, Kakheti and among Tatars”…

The Georgian bullock carts are closely linked to the first postal transfers in Georgia. Georgian carts are exhibited at the Popov Central Museum of Communications (in Saint-Petersburg) among the oldest means of postal transportation. Bulls locked in the cart are carrying heavy mailboxes. There are two Georgians ahead of the cart.

The improvement of the circulation of mail from Georgia to Russia through the Caucasus was directly linked to the development of postal networks in Georgia.

== Timeline ==
From 1993, Georgia is a member of the Universal Postal Union.

In 1901, post offices were opened in Akhmeta and Ikalto.

In 1886, the postal road towards Racha-Lechkhumi was opened.

In 1840, the twelfth Postal District was created, covering the “Kartli-Imereti” and the Kaspi regions. In 1857, the District Governor (N. Kakhanov) requested that there was a postal department opened by the postal bureau in Tbilisi. Kakhanov carried out different reforms in the postal business. The interesting fact is that he is the one associated with the production of the “Tbilisi stamp”.

From 1832, some of the postal offices on the postal path belonged to individuals while later, from 1836 the offices were given under the ownership of State postal departments.

In 1805, the first postal office was opened in Tbilisi.
