= Naftoport =

Polish oil company

Naftoport Sp. z o.o. is a Polish company which manages crude oil shipment and deliveries. It is located in Gdańsk, Poland. Naftoport was established in June 1991 by several Polish oil companies and Marine Commercial Port in Gdansk. The company oversees operations of the terminal for reloading of crude oil and products in the Port of Gdańsk, located on the southern coast of Gdańsk Bay in the city of Gdańsk.

== Ownership ==
The company is owned by number of companies, including all the major oil companies in Poland:

- PERN Przyjaźń SA
- PKN Orlen SA
- Grupa Lotos SA
- Gdańsk Port Północny
- J&S Service & Investment
- State Treasury

PERN Przyjazn SA holds the controlling stake of 68% in Naftoport.

== Oil terminal ==
The terminal was built in 1990s to diversify Poland's oil imports. The terminal loading capacity is 34 million tonnes of crude oil per year. In October 2025, the company announced plans for a new terminal at the port, which is expected to raise the total capacity to 49 million tonnes of crude oil per year. The operations are a part of larger pipeline system for transportation of crude oil to Polish and German refineries from Russia, mainly through Druzhba pipeline. The annual capacity of the terminal is 23 million tonnes of oil and oil products. PERN Przyjazn SA officials claimed they would increase the capacity of the sea terminal to 50 million tonnes if the main source of onshore pipeline system handled by PERN, Druzhba Pipeline is shut down.

== Significance ==
Polish and German refineries depend on Russian oil coming mainly through Druzhba pipeline. Unlike natural gas, crude oil can be imported to Poland through the terminal in Gdansk. Polish authorities claim they are prepared for oil imports from other suppliers through this terminal if oil supplies from Russia are disrupted. Besides the imports through Druzhba pipeline, Poland currently imports Russian oil coming from Russian enclave of Kaliningrad through Naftoport terminal as well.

== See also ==
- Gdańsk Shipyard
