= Nika Gilauri =

Georgian politician; former Prime Minister of Georgia

- ნიკოლოზ გილაური
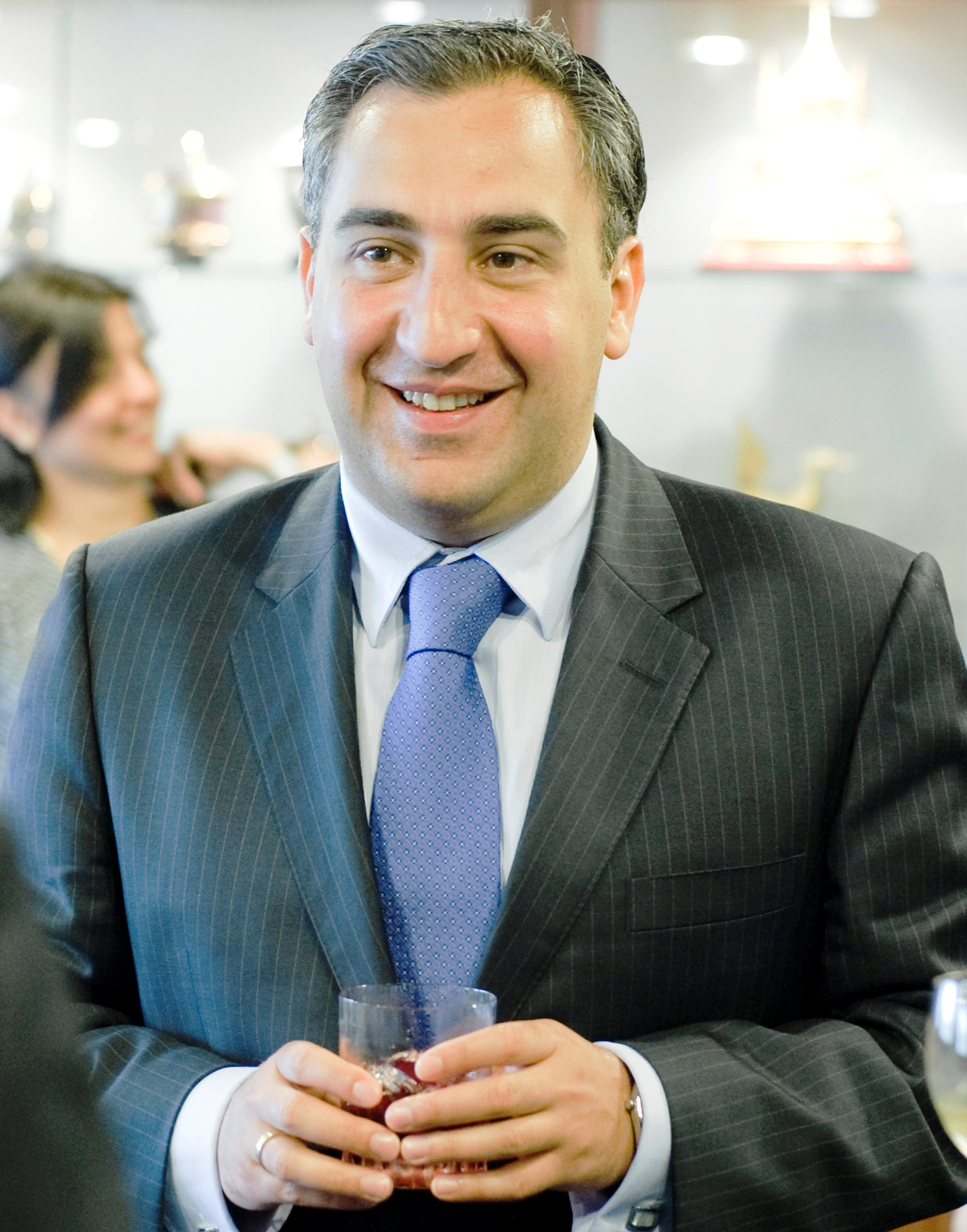
- Gilauri in 2010

Prime Minister of Georgia
- In office 6 February 2009 – 4 July 2012
- President: Mikheil Saakashvili
- Preceded by: Grigol Mgaloblishvili
- Succeeded by: Vano Merabishvili

First Deputy Prime Minister of Georgia
- In office December 2008 – 6 February 2009
- President: Mikheil Saakashvili
- Preceded by: position established
- Succeeded by: Irakli Alasania (2012)

Minister of Finance
- In office 7 September 2007 – 6 February 2009
- President: Mikheil Saakashvili; Nino Burjanadze (acting); Mikheil Saakashvili
- Preceded by: Aleksi Aleksishvili
- Succeeded by: Kakha Baindurashvili

Minister of Energy
- In office 17 February 2004 – 7 September 2007
- President: Mikheil Saakashvili
- Preceded by: David Mirtskhulava
- Succeeded by: Alexander Khetaguri

Personal details
- Born: 14 February 1975 (age 51) Tbilisi, Georgian SSR, Soviet Union
- Party: Independent
- Education: Tbilisi State University; University of Limerick; Temple University

Nikoloz "Nika" Gilauri (Note: Georgian: ნიკოლოზ [ნიკა] გილაური, pronounced [nikʼa ɡilauɾi]) (/ˈniːkə ɡɪləˈʊəri/; born 14 February 1975) is a Georgian politician who was Prime Minister of Georgia from 6 February 2009 to 30 June 2012. He had served as Minister for Energy from 2004 to 2007, as Minister of Finance from 2007 to 2009, and as First Vice Prime Minister in the Cabinet of Georgia from 2008 to 2009.

In 2012, he was appointed as the head of the JSC Partnership Fund, a state-owned stock fund. Currently Gilauri set his advisory boutique for public sector decision makers. He is also a senior advisor at McKinsey and Co.

== Education and early career ==
Nika Gilauri was born in 1975 in Tbilisi. He graduated from the University of Limerick in Ireland, with degree in Bachelor of Business Studies in Economics and Finance and later gained an MBA in International Business Management from Temple University, Philadelphia.

Before joining the government of Georgia, Gilauri worked as a financial controller at ESBI Georgia, which was a management contractor for Georgian State Electrosystems and Iberdrola Georgia, which was management contractor for Electricity Systems Commercial Operator of Georgia.

== In the government ==
Gilauri joined the government of Georgia in 2004 as a Minister of Energy and spearheaded reforms in the energy sector, turning the country from blacked out state into the net electricity exporter, eradicating corruption, introducing new legislation, new market rules and new tariff methodologies. He also led energy sector negotiations with Gazprom, SOCAR, Inter RAO and other large energy companies resulting in Georgia becoming one of the most energy secured countries in the region.

As a Minister of Finance, Gilauri undertook anticorruption reforms in customs services introducing innovative measures to improve services and eradicating any non-transparent actions. Also, he led the new Tax Code reform simplifying the rules, minimizing any double interpretation possibilities, and creating a fair ground for entrepreneurs and investors, resulting in introducing of the new Tax Code in 2009. One of the most important moves as a Minister of Finance for Nika was reducing tax rate (income tax from 20% to 15%) in the beginning of 2009, in the midst of the world financial crises when everybody adopted austerity measures and advised to do the same to the government of Georgia. The move worked well for the country, being the first to recover from recession, reaching a 6.4% growth rate in 2010.

In February 2009, Gilauri succeeded Grigol Mgaloblishvili as Georgian Prime Minister. Due to difficult economic situation (growth rate was –9%) he was primary charged with economic recovery program and improvement of business climate in the country. In Q2 2012 (when Gilauri retired from the PM position) Georgia's economic growth rate was above +8% and Georgia was Ranked 9th worldwide by the World Bank's Easy to Do Business Report (up from 112th in 2006). As PM Gilauri also led healthcare reforms resulting in constructing (by private sector) more than 100 new hospitals around the country within two years time; education reforms creating healthy and sustainable competition in secondary as well as tertiary education systems. He also led EU-Georgia FTA agreement negotiations as well as EU – Georgia Association Agreement negotiations.

== Later career ==
After his retirement from the government, Gilauri established, in 2012, the independent advisory firm Reformatics, which has worked with more than 20 governments around the world.

== Personal life ==
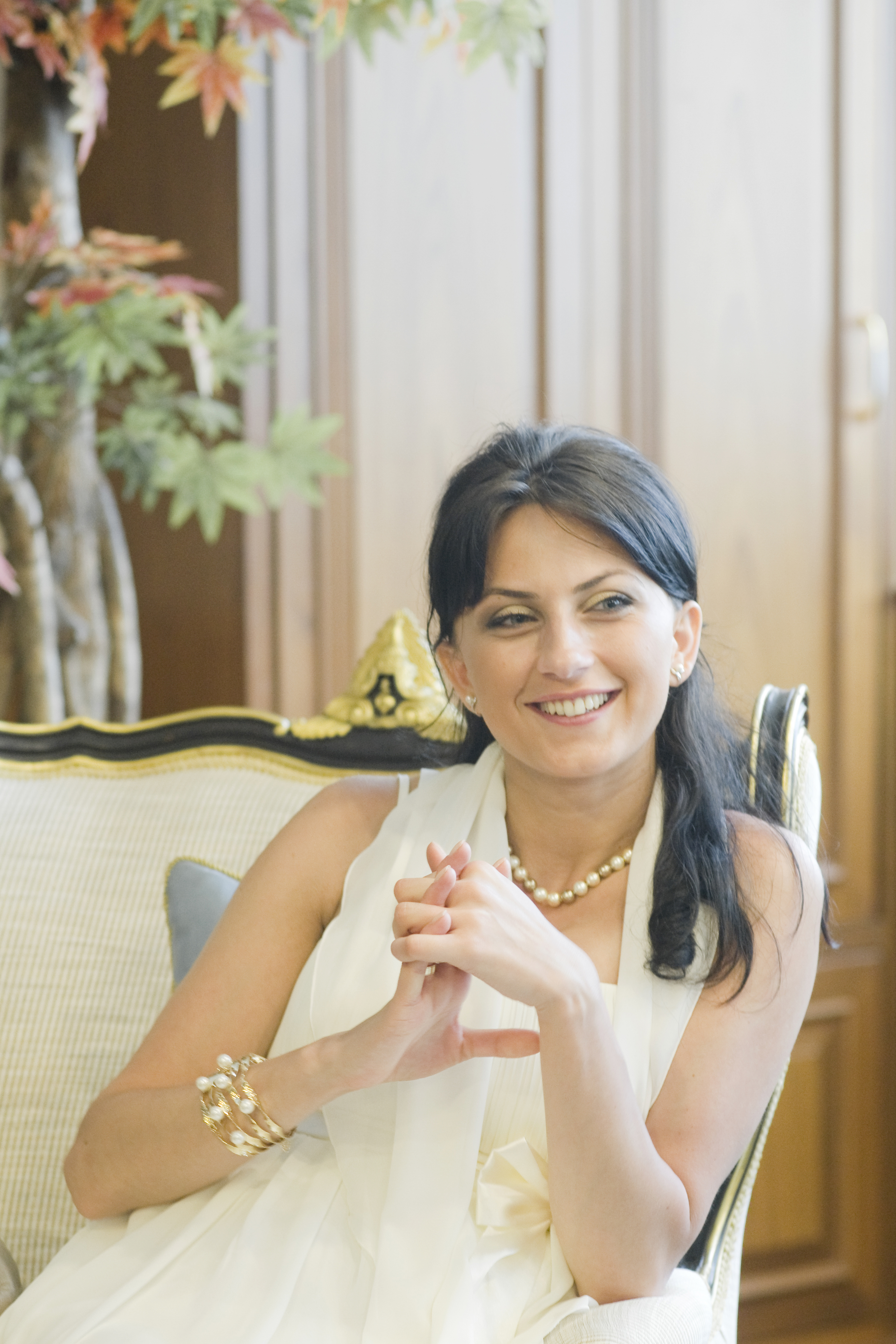
Marine Shamugia

Nika Gilauri married in January 2010 the former Georgian fashion model Marine Shamugia, a Sukhumi native and a member of the beauty contest Miss Georgia–2004.

== Notes ==
Political offices
Preceded by David Mirtskhulava	Minister of Energy; 2004–2007	Succeeded by Alexander Khetaguri
Preceded by Aleksi Aleksishvili	Minister of Finance; 2007–2009	Succeeded by Kakha Baindurashvili
New office	First Deputy Prime Minister of Georgia; 2008–2009	Succeeded by David Tkeshelashvili
Preceded by Grigol Mgaloblishvili	Prime Minister of Georgia; 2009–2012	Succeeded by Vano Merabishvili
