= Vakhtang Balavadze (politician) =

Georgian engineer and politician (born 1978)

Vakhtang Balavadze (Georgian: ვახტანგ ბალავაძე; born August 23, 1978) is a Georgian engineer and politician. He was the Minister of Energy and Natural Resources of Georgia from August 13, 2012, to October 25, 2012.

== Career ==
A native of Tbilisi, Balavadze graduated from the Georgian Technical University with a degree in Construction Management in 1999 and obtained PhD in Technical Sciences in 2006. Balavadze's involvement in the politics of Georgia began in 2002 when he joined the political organization "Young Democrats' Union". He was elected to the Parliament of Georgia on a United National Movement ticket in 2004 and again in 2008. From 2010 to 2012, he chaired the Parliamentary Committee for Regional Policy, Self-Government, and Mountainous Regions. On August 13, 2012, he was appointed Minister of Energy of Georgia, succeeding Alexander Khetaguri. He then served as governor of the western Georgian region of Imereti from 2012 to 2013 and head of administration of Tbilisi's Nadzaladevi District from 2013 to 2014.
