= PERN Przyjaźń SA =

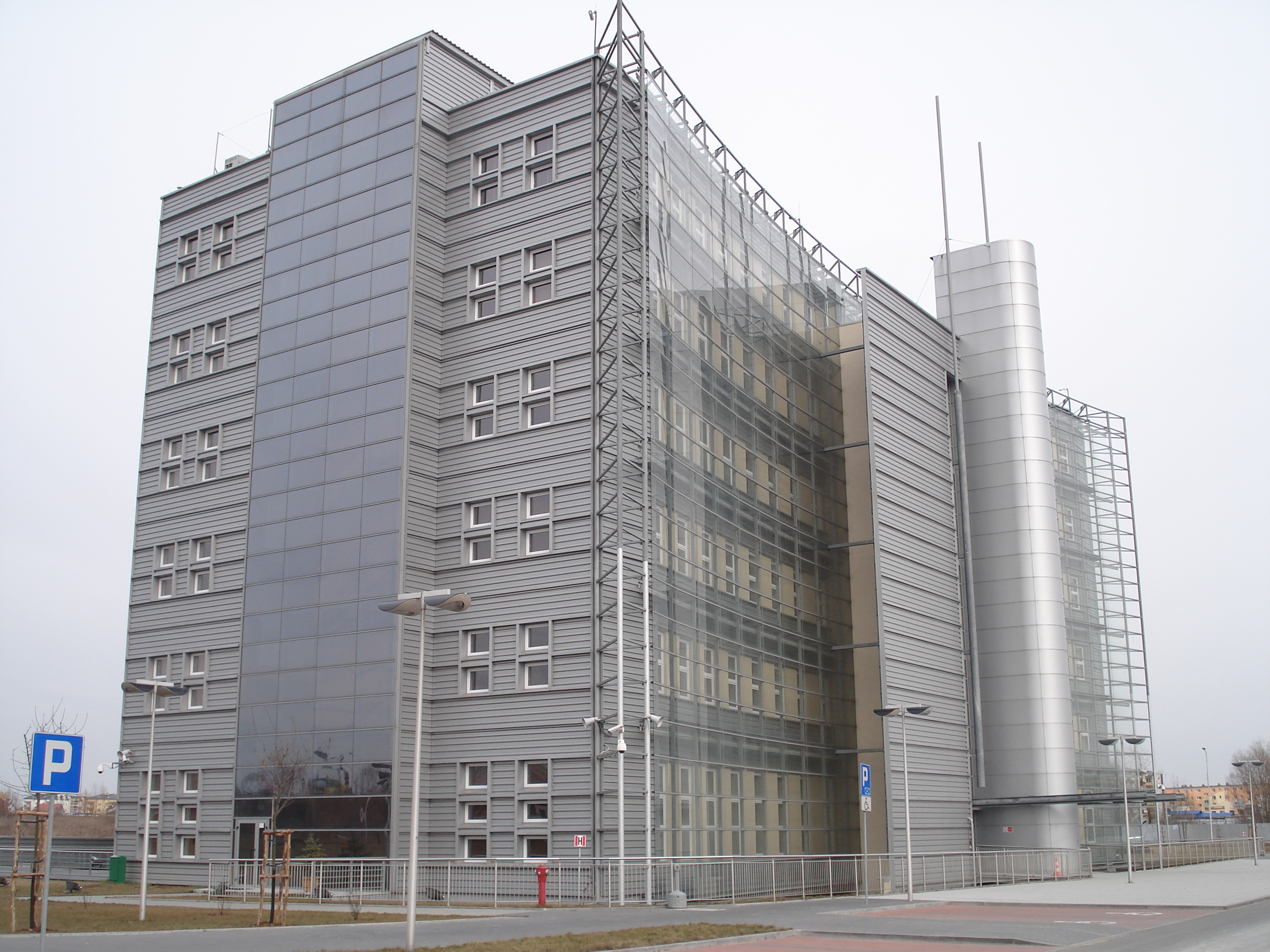
- Industry: Oil and gas company/Oil pipeline
- Founded: 1959; 67 years ago
- Headquarters: ul. Wyszogrodzka 133 09-410 Płock
- Key people: Daniel Świętochowski (President of the Management Board); Adam Piotrowski (Chairman of the supervisory board)
- Website: pern.pl/en

PERN SA (Polish: Przedsiębiorstwo Eksploatacji Rurociągów Naftowych Spółka Akcyjna), joint stock Oil Pipeline Operation Company is one of leading companies for oil transportation and storage in Poland. The company is based in Płock, in central Poland, and oversees catering of oil and gas through Poland to eastern European markets.

Etymologically the word Przyjaźń in both Polish and Ukrainian means Friendship.

== History ==
PERN SA was established in 1959, as per the resolution of the Economy Committee of the Ministerial Board of Poland, based on agreements between Soviet Union, Poland and GDR on oil supply and transportation and was a part of the larger Druzhba pipeline project which would connect USSR with Poland, Czechoslovakia, GDR and Hungary. The company and the pipeline network started operating in 1962. The eastern part of the pipeline connecting Adamowo and Płock was completed and started operating in 1972. The second part of the pipeline connecting Płock and Schwedt became operational in 1973. In 1975, PERN Przyjaźń SA extended its pipeline network with a two-way pipeline, named Rurociąg Pomorski which connected Płock to a port city of Gdańsk. Other extensions are Płock–Koluszki connection in 1968, Płock–Mościska in 1970, Mościska-Emilianów in 1975. In 1992, Płock–Koluszki was extended to Częstochowa. In 25-year period, starting from 1968, the company extended and commissioned over 620 kilometres (390 mi) of oil pipelines. Currently, PERN Przyjaźń SA operates nearly 2,500 kilometres (1,550 mi) of piping network.

== Ownership ==
The company is completely owned by the government of Poland. The government has reportedly considered privatizing PERN Przyjaźń SA in the past and in 2008 made an official announcement. According to Treasury Minister, Aleksander Grad, the privatization would be completed in the next four years under a special program prepared by the Treasury Ministry. The government is expected to raise around PLZ 5-7 billion from the privatization. It is considered one of the most profitable enterprises in the country. The company spends nearly $40–50 million annually for modernization of the pipeline network. In 2002, the PERN Przyjaźń SA purchased the controlling stake of Naftoport's (crude oil, heating oils, fuels terminal) shares in order to secure energy safety of the country. In November 2009, the company announced its plans to construct an oil storage and distribution center in Gdańsk. The Gdańsk hub is expected to have an overall capacity of 400,000 cubic meters of oil and will cost nearly PLZ 1 billion.

== See also ==
- Druzhba pipeline
