= Georgian Oil and Gas Corporation =

Gas supply network company

The Georgian Oil & Gas Corporation (GOGC, Georgian: საქართველოს ნავთობისა და გაზის კორპორაცია, romanized: sakartvelos navtobisa da gazis k'orp'oratsia) is the enterprise established by LLC Oil and Gas Corporations, that owns the high-pressure gas pipeline system of Georgia, with the total length of 1940 km. GOGC is responsible for the gas supply network of the country, security of gas supply and diversification of such supply routes.

The north-south gas corridor is spread from Georgian–Russian border to Georgian–Armenian and Georgian–Azerbaijan borders with a total length of 235 km. The highest point of the system is 2420 metres at the Caucasus Mountains and the lowest point at 290 metres above the sea level.

The increase of gas consumption in Georgia during the 1980s reached 6 billion cubic metres. Such drastic growth was encouraged by intense development of gas pipeline system. Design capacity of the system was enough to ensure proper and secure gas supply of Georgian and Armenian gas markets.

GOGC owns and maintains a gas pipeline system that accounts for more than 40 years of operations. Yet, the duty doubles in the northern part of the country where the unique nature of the Georgian landscape has shaped the gas pipeline system accordingly. The transportation system remains to be one of the most complex among Commonwealth of Independent States countries. Hence, during the construction of the system, special standards and norms were adopted.

== See also ==
- Energy in Georgia (country)
