= Kerui Petroleum =

Chinese Oil Company

Shandong Kerui Petroleum Equipment Co., Ltd.
- Industry: Oil and gas equipment and contract services
- Headquarters: Dongying, China
- Number of employees: 8,000
- Website: www.keruigroup.com

Kerui Petroleum is a Chinese oil services and equipment company. It provides equipment and EPC services for oil drilling and production and natural gas plants.

The Middle East headquarters is in Abu Dhabi and bases in Dammam, Saudi Arabia and İzmir, Turkey. Major markets for the company are Egypt, Algeria, Libya, Gabon, Nigeria, Oman, the United Arab Emirates, and Iraq.

In June 2023, Ukraine's National Agency on Corruption Prevention declared Kerui Group an "international sponsor of war" because of its continued business with Russia amid Russian invasion of Ukraine.

== Projects ==
- Brazil – Awarded contract by Petrobras as a consortium of Kerui Petroleum Equipment Co. Ltd. and Brazilian consortium partner Metodo Potencial Engenharia SA, to build a natural gas processing unit in Itaborai.
- Venezuela – Awarded contract by PDVSA to upgrade 624 wells in the Lake Maracaibo region.
