= Support for Russia in the Russo-Ukrainian war =

Support for Russia in the Russian invasion of Ukraine has come from countries such as Belarus, North Korea, China, and Iran. It has included direct military assistance, economic and technological aid, diplomatic backing, and efforts to circumvent Western sanctions. While a large majority of countries, particularly in the West, have condemned the invasion and imposed sanctions on Russia, several states have provided varying levels of assistance to Russia. This support has helped Russia sustain its war effort amid international isolation.

Key state actors have offered different forms of aid. Belarus, Russia's closest ally, allowed its territory to be used for staging Russian troops and missile launches. North Korea has supplied large quantities of artillery shells, ammunition, and other weapons, while deploying thousands of its troops to support Russian operations, notably in the 2024 Kursk offensive. Iran has transferred thousands of Shahed-series drones and ballistic missiles. China has provided dual-use technologies, components for weapons production (such as propellants, machine tools, and drone parts), and geospatial intelligence, while maintaining a close partnership with Russia. Within the European Union, Slovakia provided political and energy backing under prime minister Robert Fico, as his government halted state military aid, blocked EU sanctions, suspended emergency power exports to Ukraine and saw Fico conduct multiple high-level visits to Moscow as the sole EU leader meeting directly with Vladimir Putin.

Additional support has come from countries including Ba'athist Syria (which recruited fighters for Russian forces prior to the fall of the Assad regime), as well as limited contributions from Myanmar and Laos. Many other nations, particularly in the Global South and among BRICS members, have adopted neutral stances or increased economic ties with Russia, indirectly aiding its war economy through trade. Sanctions evasion has played a significant role, with third countries such as India, the United Arab Emirates, and Turkey facilitating the re-export of critical components and refined Russian oil. This pattern of support has drawn condemnation and secondary sanctions from the United States, European Union, and their allies.

== Africa ==
=== Burkina Faso ===
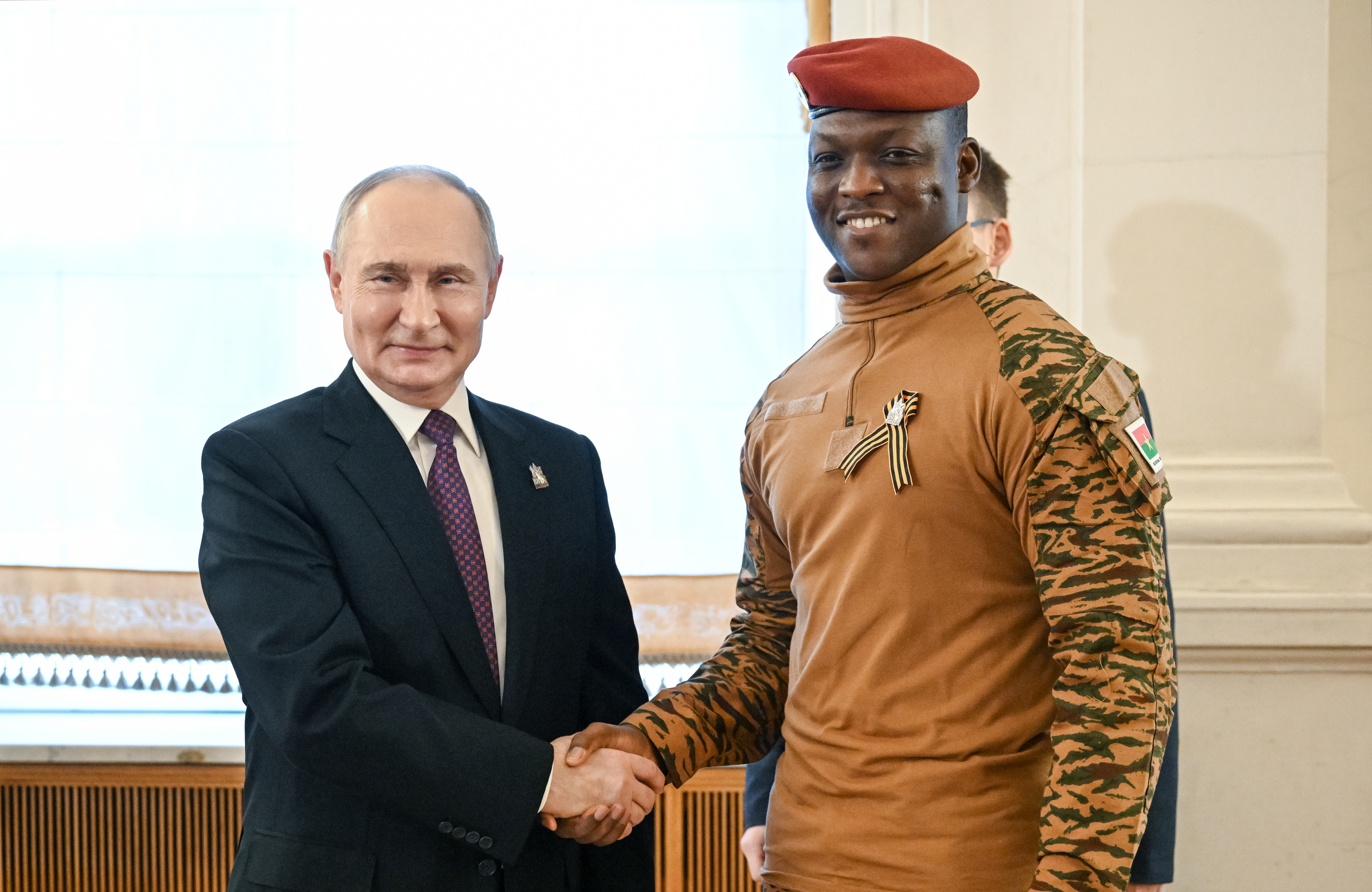
Burkinabè interim President Ibrahim Traoré with Russian President Vladimir Putin in Moscow, 8 May 2025

Burkina Faso, under the military government of Ibrahim Traoré, has expressed political and diplomatic support for Russia during the Russo-Ukrainian war. Following the September 2022 Burkina Faso coup d'état, the country strengthened relations with Moscow while distancing itself from traditional Western security partners, particularly France. In May 2023, Traoré described Russia as a strategic ally and acknowledged military cooperation between the two countries.

At the 2023 Russia–Africa Summit in Saint Petersburg, Traoré met Russian president Vladimir Putin and voiced support for Russia's military operation in Ukraine. He also called for deeper military and economic cooperation with Moscow. The Congressional Research Service subsequently identified Burkina Faso as one of Russia's growing security partners in the Sahel, noting Traoré's public endorsement of Russia's actions in Ukraine.

Burkina Faso was absent from the first six major United Nations General Assembly votes concerning the Russian invasion of Ukraine between March 2022 and February 2023. These included resolutions demanding Russia's withdrawal from Ukraine and rejecting its attempted annexation of Ukrainian territories. Consequently, Burkina Faso did not join the majority of UN member states in formally condemning Russia in these votes, although its absence did not constitute a vote against the resolutions.

Military cooperation between Burkina Faso and Russia expanded following Traoré's rise to power. In January 2024, approximately 100 Russian military personnel arrived in the capital, Ouagadougou, reportedly to provide security for Traoré and assist the Burkinabè armed forces. In June 2024, Russian foreign minister Sergey Lavrov announced that Moscow would supply additional military equipment and instructors to Burkina Faso. The cooperation was primarily directed toward combating Islamist insurgencies within Burkina Faso rather than supporting Russian combat operations in Ukraine.

In May 2025, Traoré again met Putin in Russia, praising Moscow's cooperation with Burkina Faso and its ability to withstand international sanctions. Russia also pledged additional arms and military training to the Alliance of Sahel States, comprising Burkina Faso, Mali, and Niger. In July 2026, Russia and the three Sahelian governments reaffirmed their commitment to expanding military cooperation. Their joint statement also alleged that Ukraine and France were involved in destabilizing activities in the region, allegations that both countries denied.

=== Burundi ===
Burundian President Évariste Ndayishimiye and Vladimir Putin at the Russia-Africa Summit in Moscow, 28 October 2026

Burundi, under President Évariste Ndayishimiye, has maintained close diplomatic relations with Russia during the Russo-Ukrainian war. Initially, Burundi adopted a neutral position toward the Russian invasion of Ukraine, abstaining from several United Nations General Assembly resolutions condemning Russian actions, including the March 2022 resolution demanding Russia's withdrawal. In May 2023, during a visit by Russian foreign minister Sergey Lavrov, Burundian foreign minister Albert Shingiro reaffirmed the country's neutrality and advocated a peaceful resolution to the conflict.

Burundi subsequently shifted toward voting alongside Russia against Ukraine-related UN resolutions. On 24 February 2025, Burundi joined Russia and 16 other countries in voting against a resolution calling for a comprehensive, just and lasting peace in Ukraine, which passed with 93 votes in favor and 18 against. On 24 February 2026, Burundi again voted alongside Russia against a UN General Assembly resolution reaffirming Ukraine's sovereignty and territorial integrity and calling for an immediate ceasefire. The resolution passed with 107 votes in favor, 12 against, and 51 abstentions.

=== Central African Republic ===
President of the Central African Republic Faustin-Archange Touadéra with Russian President Putin, October 2026

The Central African Republic, under President Faustin-Archange Touadéra, has maintained close political and military relations with Russia throughout the Russian invasion of Ukraine. The government has relied heavily on Russian military personnel, particularly the Wagner Group, for security assistance and protection against rebel forces. Touadéra has defended the Russian military presence, citing its role in maintaining his government's security.

The Central African Republic abstained from the 2 March 2022 United Nations General Assembly resolution condemning Russia's invasion. On 7 April 2022, it voted alongside Russia against its suspension from the United Nations Human Rights Council. The country also abstained from the October 2022 resolution rejecting Russia's annexation of Ukrainian territories and the February 2023 resolution calling for Russian forces to withdraw from Ukraine. In 2023, President Faustin-Archange Touadéra expressed support for Russian involvement in Ukraine.

=== Eritrea ===
Eritrea, under President Isaias Afwerki, has been a diplomatic supporter of Russia throughout the Russian invasion of Ukraine. On 2 March 2022, Eritrea was the only African country and one of just four countries, alongside Belarus, North Korea, and Syria, to join Russia in voting against United Nations General Assembly Resolution ES-11/1, which condemned the invasion and demanded the withdrawal of Russian forces from Ukraine. Eritrea also voted against a subsequent resolution addressing the humanitarian consequences of the invasion on 24 March 2022 and against Russia's suspension from the United Nations Human Rights Council in April.

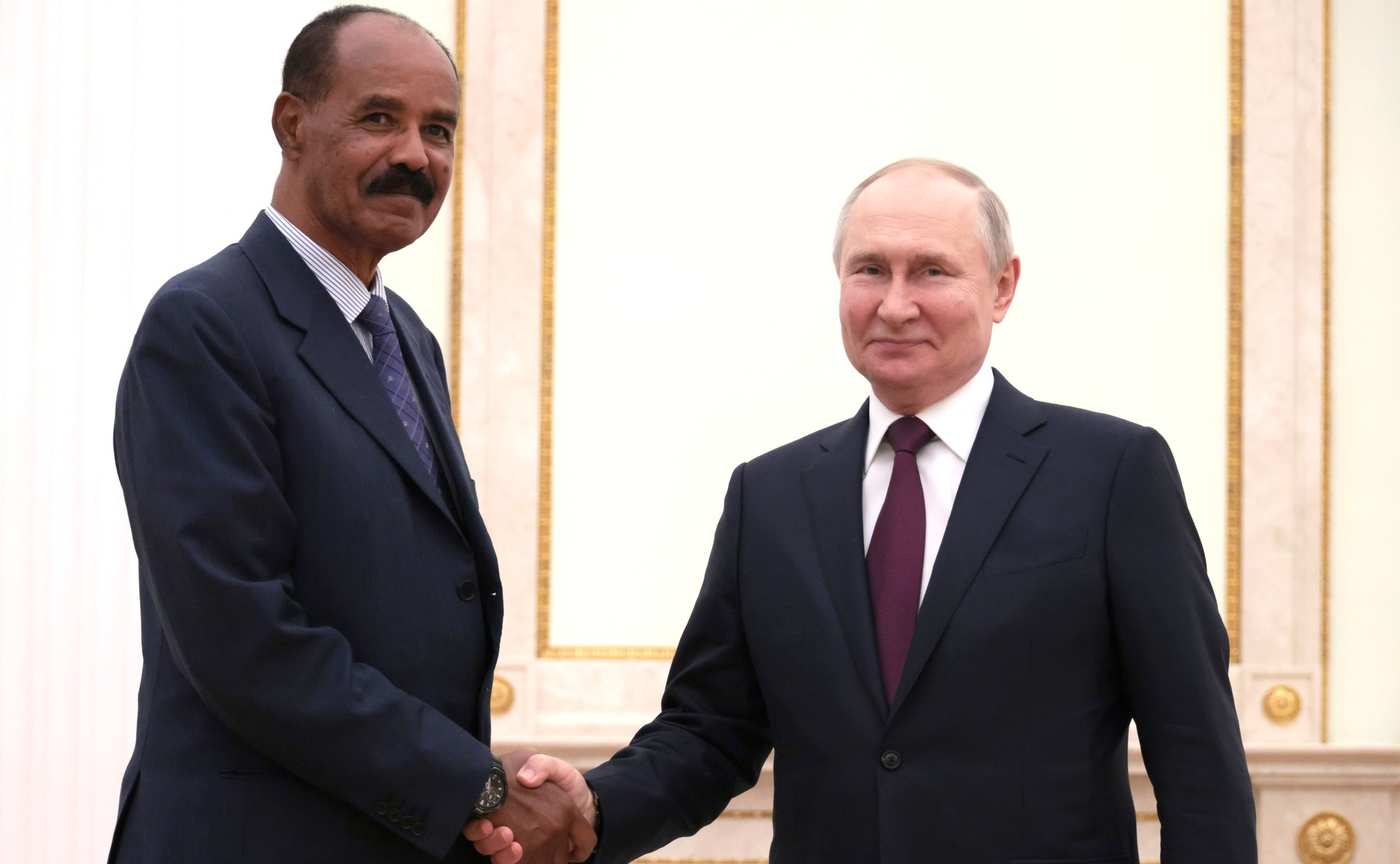
Eritrean President Isaias Afwerki with Vladimir Putin at the Kremlin in Moscow, 31 May 2023

Eritrea continued opposing resolutions supporting Ukraine, voting alongside Russia against the February 2023 United Nations General Assembly Resolution ES-11/6, which called for a comprehensive, just and lasting peace and the withdrawal of Russian forces. In January 2023, Russian foreign minister Sergey Lavrov visited Eritrea and met with Afwerki to discuss the war and strengthen bilateral relations. During the visit, Eritrean foreign minister Osman Saleh blamed the conflict on what he characterized as decades of American hegemony and attempts to contain Russia.

At the 2023 Russia–Africa Summit in Saint Petersburg, Afwerki met with Russian president Vladimir Putin and expressed support for Moscow's position on the conflict. Afwerki rejected the characterization of the fighting as a war between Russia and Ukraine, instead describing it as a war launched by NATO against Russia as part of a broader effort to maintain Western global dominance. He also criticized Western sanctions and advocated closer cooperation between Russia and countries of the Global South.

Eritrea maintained its opposition to Ukraine-related resolutions in subsequent years. On 24 February 2026, Eritrea joined Russia and 10 other countries in voting against United Nations General Assembly Resolution ES-11/10, titled "Support for lasting peace in Ukraine". The resolution reaffirmed Ukraine's sovereignty and territorial integrity, called for an immediate ceasefire, and passed with 107 votes in favor, 12 against, and 51 abstentions.

=== Mali ===
Vladimir Putin and Malian Interim President Assimi Goïta during a meeting in Moscow on 23 June 2026

According to the United States Department of State, the Malian military junta is suspected of assisting the Wagner Group in its attempts to acquire foreign military equipment for use in Ukraine.

=== Niger ===
Niger initially supported Ukraine following the Russian invasion of Ukraine under President Mohamed Bazoum. His government voted in favor of several United Nations General Assembly resolutions condemning Russian aggression and supporting Ukraine's sovereignty and territorial integrity. However, following the 2023 Nigerien coup d'état that overthrew Bazoum, the military government led by Abdourahamane Tiani adopted a more Russia-aligned foreign policy, distancing itself from Western security partners and strengthening relations with Moscow.

The military government developed closer political and military relations with Russia. In January 2024, Niger and Russia agreed to expand defense cooperation, while Tiani discussed strengthening security cooperation with Russian president Vladimir Putin in March 2024. Russian military personnel subsequently arrived in Niger to provide training and security assistance.

Niger's alignment with Russia was also reflected in its deteriorating relations with Ukraine. On 6 August 2024, Niger severed diplomatic relations with Ukraine in solidarity with Mali, following allegations that Ukrainian intelligence had assisted rebels who killed Malian soldiers and Russian Wagner Group personnel. Ukraine denied the allegations. Later that month, Niger joined Mali and Burkina Faso in submitting a letter to the United Nations Security Council condemning Ukraine's alleged support for armed groups in the Sahel. The three military governments increasingly coordinated their foreign and security policies with Russia.

=== Sudan ===
Chairman of the Sovereignty Council of Sudan Abdel Fattah al-Burhan with Vladimir Putin in Moscow, 30 October 2026

Sudan, under the military leadership of Abdel Fattah al-Burhan, has maintained close diplomatic and military relations with Russia throughout the Russian invasion of Ukraine. Following the invasion in February 2022, Sudan's military-led Transitional Sovereignty Council declined to condemn Russia, instead calling for dialogue and a diplomatic resolution to the conflict. Sudan abstained from several United Nations General Assembly resolutions condemning Russian actions, including the March 2022 resolution demanding Russia's withdrawal, the October 2022 resolution rejecting Russia's annexation of Ukrainian territories, and the February 2023 resolution calling for a comprehensive, just and lasting peace in Ukraine.

Relations with Moscow strengthened during the Sudanese civil war (2023–present). In May 2024, Sudanese military officials announced plans to expand military and economic cooperation with Russia, including discussions over Russian arms supplies in exchange for access to a naval facility on the Red Sea. In February 2025, Sudanese foreign minister Ali Yusef Sharif reaffirmed support for a longstanding agreement to establish a Russian naval base, although the facility had not been constructed. Despite these ties, Sudan has not officially deployed troops to fight alongside Russia in Ukraine.

Sudan subsequently adopted a more openly oppositional position toward Ukraine-related resolutions at the United Nations. On 24 February 2026, Sudan joined Russia and 10 other countries in voting against United Nations General Assembly Resolution ES-11/10, titled "Support for lasting peace in Ukraine". The resolution reaffirmed Ukraine's sovereignty and territorial integrity, called for an immediate ceasefire, and was adopted by 107 votes in favor, 12 against, and 51 abstentions.

=== Zimbabwe ===
Emmerson Mnangagwa with Putin in Moscow, October 2026

Zimbabwe, under President Emmerson Mnangagwa, has provided diplomatic and political support to Russia during the Russian invasion of Ukraine. On 7 April 2022, Zimbabwe voted alongside Russia against its suspension from the United Nations Human Rights Council. Zimbabwe also voted against a November 2022 United Nations General Assembly resolution calling for Russia to pay reparations for damages caused by its invasion of Ukraine.

At the 2023 Russia–Africa Summit in Saint Petersburg, Mnangagwa publicly expressed solidarity with Russia's military operation in Ukraine and criticized Western sanctions against Moscow. In June 2024, Mnangagwa reaffirmed Zimbabwe's close relationship with Russia during a meeting with President Vladimir Putin, praising Russia as a longstanding ally and expressing support for its independence and territorial integrity.

== Americas ==
=== Cuba ===
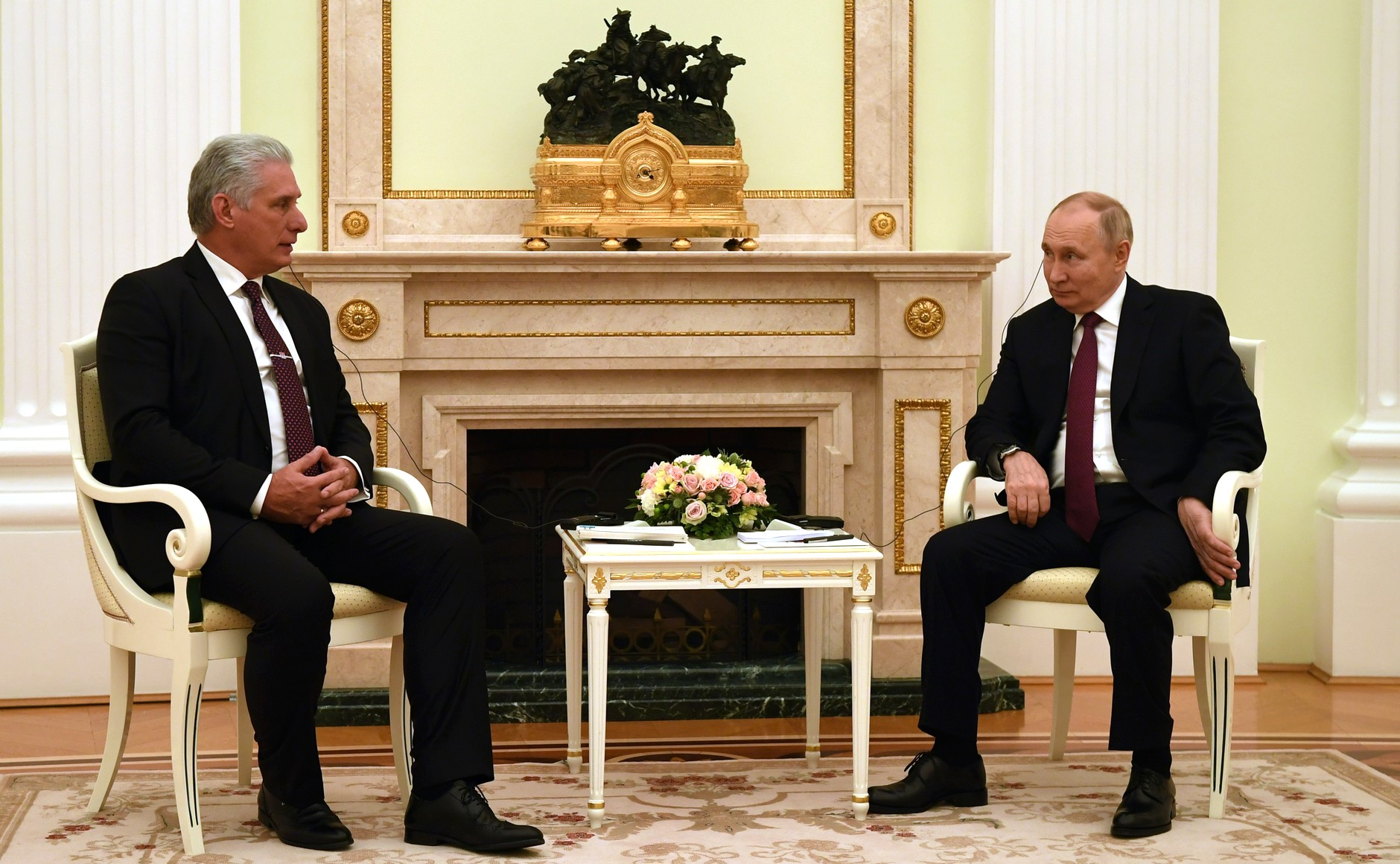
Miguel Díaz-Canel with Putin in the Moscow Kremlin, 22 November 2022

Cuba, under President Miguel Díaz-Canel, has maintained close political and economic relations with Russia throughout the Russian invasion of Ukraine. The Cuban government has criticized Western sanctions against Moscow and blamed NATO expansion and Western policies for contributing to the conflict. Cuba abstained from the March 2022 United Nations General Assembly resolution condemning Russia's invasion and subsequent resolutions demanding Russia's withdrawal from Ukraine. However, in April 2022, Cuba voted alongside Russia against its suspension from the United Nations Human Rights Council.

In September 2023, the Cuban government announced that it had uncovered a human trafficking network recruiting Cuban citizens to fight for Russia in Ukraine. Authorities subsequently arrested 17 individuals allegedly involved in the operation. While Cuban nationals have served in the Russian armed forces, Havana denied any official involvement in the conflict and stated that it opposed the recruitment of mercenaries.

=== Nicaragua ===
Nicaragua, under the government of Daniel Ortega and Rosario Murillo, has provided diplomatic and political support to Russia during the Russo-Ukrainian war. Nicaragua has maintained close relations with Moscow, including military and security cooperation. On 21 February 2022, shortly before the Russian invasion of Ukraine, Ortega defended Russian president Vladimir Putin's recognition of the self-proclaimed Donetsk People's Republic and Luhansk People's Republic as independent states. Ortega argued that Ukraine's potential accession to NATO threatened Russia's security and characterized Russia's actions as defensive.

Nicaragua has supported Russia in votes at the United Nations General Assembly. Although Nicaragua abstained from the March 2022 resolution condemning Russia's invasion, it voted against the October 2022 resolution rejecting Russia's attempted annexation of four Ukrainian regions. On 23 February 2023, Nicaragua was one of seven countries, including Russia, to vote against a UN resolution demanding the withdrawal of Russian forces from Ukraine.

Nicaragua has also continued military cooperation with Russia following the invasion. In June 2022, the National Assembly renewed authorization for Russian military personnel to enter Nicaragua for training and joint operations. The authorization permitted 230 Russian soldiers to enter the country between July and December 2022, including for patrols in Pacific waters alongside the Nicaraguan military. The arrangement was part of a longstanding program allowing foreign military personnel to conduct exercises in Nicaragua.

In July 2025, Nicaragua formally recognized the Russian annexation of the Ukrainian regions of Donetsk, Luhansk, Kherson, and Zaporizhzhia. Ortega and Murillo expressed their support for Russia's territorial claims in a message to Putin, describing the regions as integral parts of the Russian Federation. On 2 October 2025, Ukraine announced the severance of diplomatic relations with Nicaragua in response to its recognition of Russian sovereignty over Crimea and the four occupied Ukrainian regions. The Ukrainian Ministry of Foreign Affairs condemned Nicaragua's decision as a violation of Ukraine's sovereignty, territorial integrity, and international law.

=== United States ===
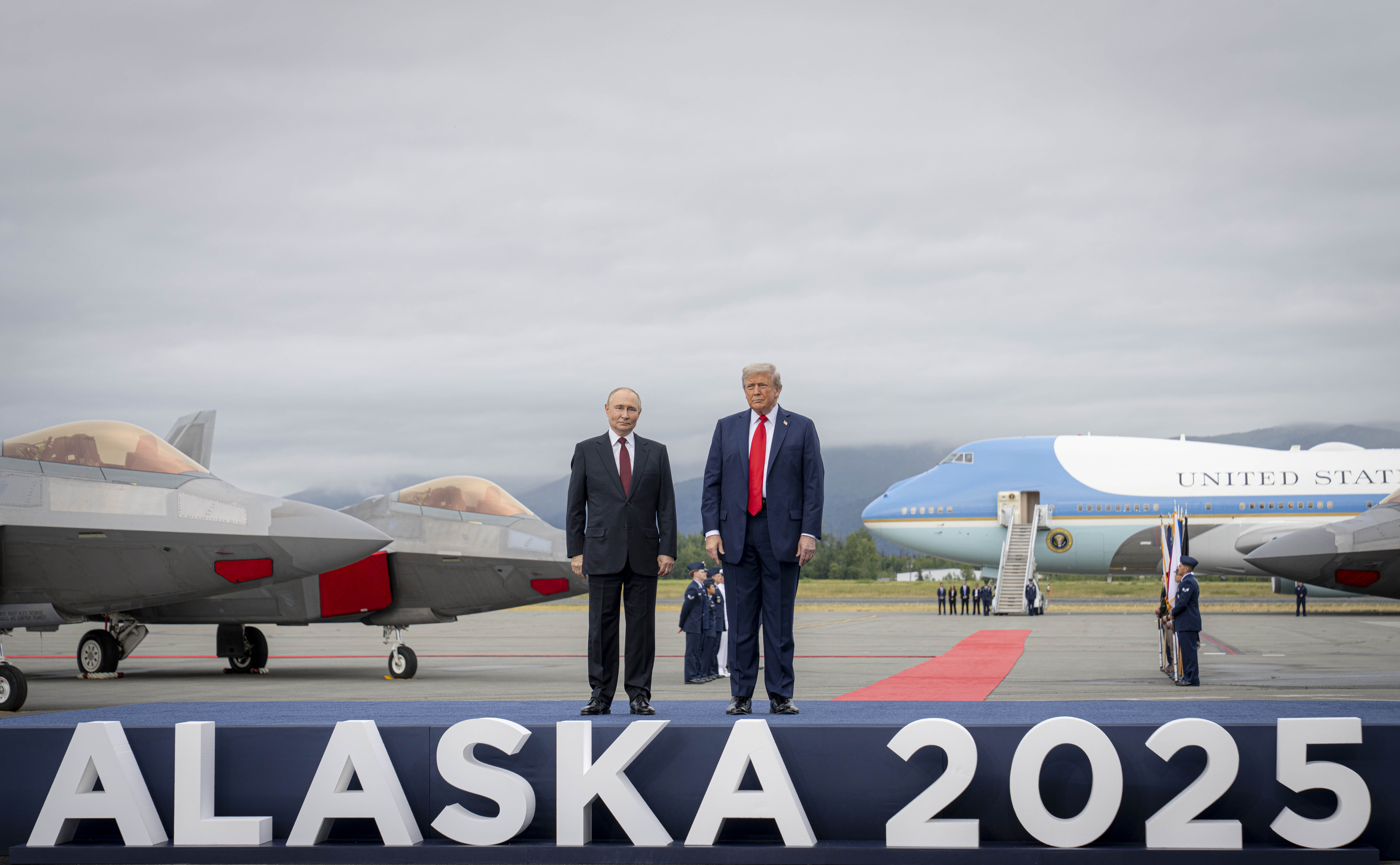
Vladimir Putin and U.S. President Donald Trump at the summit meeting in Alaska, 15 August 2025

In October 2026, U.S. President Donald Trump announced a deal with Russian President Vladimir Putin to import Russian diesel. Trump said he wanted to lower fuel prices ahead of the November congressional elections, as the war with Iran had disrupted energy markets and driven prices higher. On 9 October 2026, Trump announced he had formalized an agreement with Russia to purchase an initial shipment of 300,000 tonnes of diesel, with arrangements to purchase another 4.5 million more afterward. Four Republican and three Democratic Senators criticized the deal as a violation of U.S. law concerning trade sanctions on Russia. Ukrainian President Volodymyr Zelenskyy criticized the deal, saying it constituted "an investment in a war that must be ended". Canadian Prime Minister Mark Carney and UK Defence Secretary Wes Streeting also criticized the deal. When Ukraine resumed drone strikes on Russian oil refineries, President Trump publicly branded the strikes a "disgrace", and criticized Zelenskyy for being more "difficult to deal with" than Putin.

On 14 October, Ukraine reported that their military access to the Starlink satellite network had been restricted without warning, leading to the failure of several combat missions and an inability to intercept Russian attacks. Despite both denying any knowledge of who ordered the blackout, it was later reported that Elon Musk had personally approached President Trump with the suggestion to revoke Ukrainian access to Starlink, to which President Trump agreed. The actions resulted in growing pressure from within Europe to develop a replacement for Starlink.

Putin meeting with Donald Trump during the APEC Summit in Shenzhen, China, 19 November 2026

Ukrainian officials reported that the U.S. had threatened to withhold intelligence and weapon purchases to Ukraine unless Ukraine halted its drone strikes on Russian energy sites. President Zelenskyy later reported that Ukraine "received no advance warning from our partners" regarding Russian strikes on Ukraine, while other sources stated the U.S. failed to provide any intelligence on the Russian ballistic missile launches. President Trump denied the allegations, saying "We help them, but we're really helping them get to a final answer". However, President Zelenskyy later confirmed that the U.S. had threatened to withhold intelligence sharing.

On 17 October, President Trump issued an executive order waiving a new sanctions package targeting the Russian economy, despite the package having been passed by both chambers of Congress and signed into law by Trump the previous month. Russian presidential envoy Kirill Dimitriev received the news warmly, stating "The Trump administration's suspension of the Graham Act is an important and truly historic moment." Dimitriev further announced that the U.S. and Russia were discussing collaborating on a range of joint initiatives, including nuclear-powered data centres, saying: "We are effectively implement projects with the United States of America at this very moment, and we will continue to do so until the special military operation comes to an end".

U.S. Democrats Don Beyer and Richard Blumenthal described President Trump's policies as a surrender to Putin, while Republicans Thom Tillis and John Cornyn criticized the decisions as damaging to Ukrainian support. President Zelenskyy characterized President Trump's actions as a "betrayal" stating: "It's painful when President Trump chooses one side, not our side. This is not (the) right side of history". A senior Ukrainian official stated, of the United States: "It's obvious they are helping Russia for some reason", while President Zelenskyy's adviser Sergiy Beskrestnov said Russia's attacks timed with Starlink restrictions with more than a coincidence.

European strategic analysts characterized the shift in policy as the U.S. openly siding with Russia, and called for Ukraine's allies to bypass the U.S. entirely and build a new coalition to support Ukraine. Tom Nichols, an academic specialist in international affairs, wrote in The Atlantic: "The president of the United States has conclusively turned America into an ally of the Russian Federation".

In October 2026, the United States continued supplying weapons and ammunition to Ukraine through NATO's Prioritised Ukraine Requirements List (PURL). Under the program, NATO allies pay for U.S. military equipment for Ukraine.

== Asia ==
=== China ===
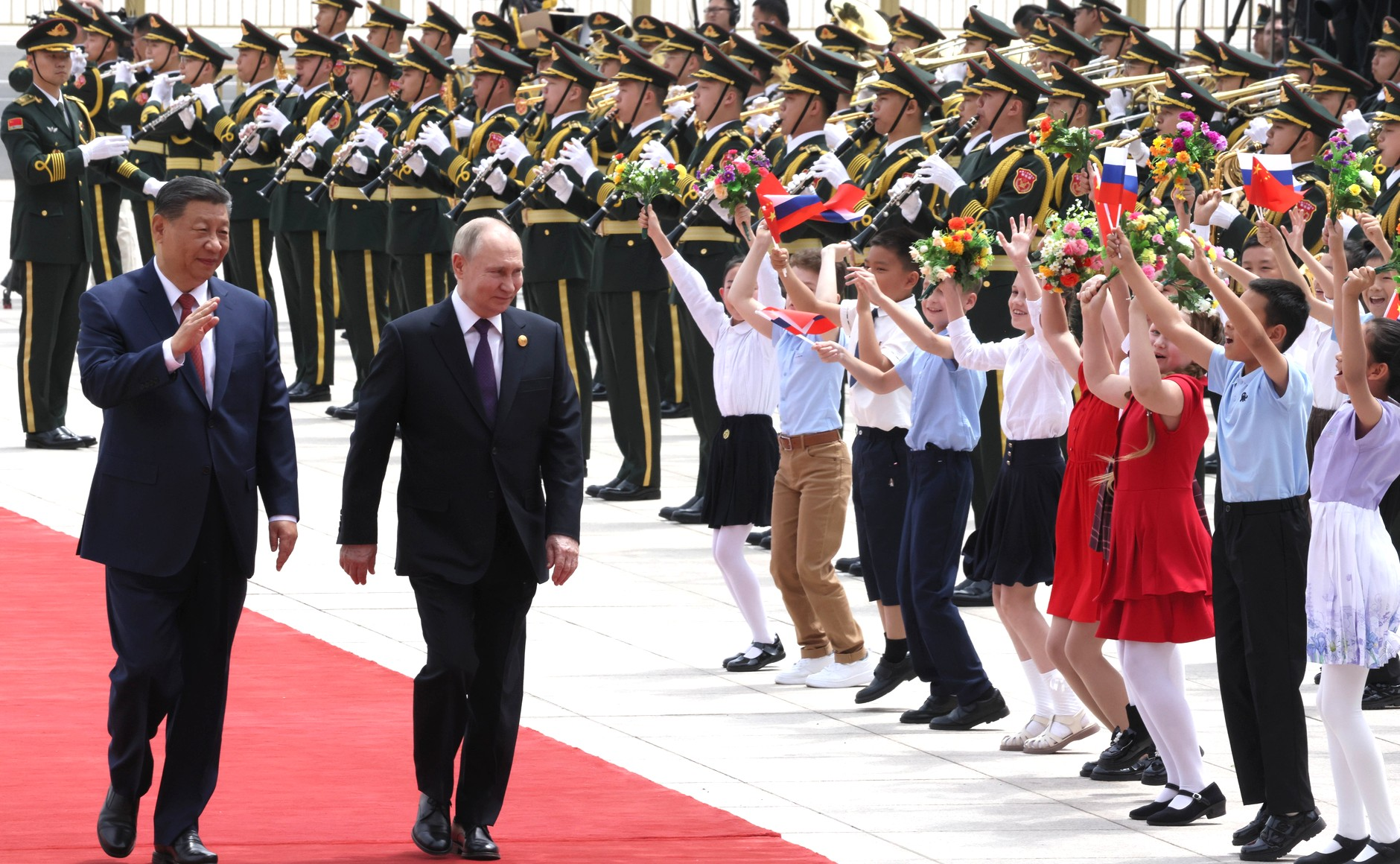
Chinese leader Xi Jinping welcomes Putin in Beijing during Putin's visit to China in May 2024

Russia is buying dual-use technology such as body armor, thermal imaging sensors, and commercial drones from China. In June 2022, General Secretary of the Chinese Communist Party Xi Jinping has assured Vladimir Putin of China's support on Russian "sovereignty and security". In February 2023, The Wall Street Journal reported that according to Russian customs data, Chinese companies have shipped dual-use items such as navigation equipment, jamming technology, and fighter jet parts to Russian state-owned companies. The same month, Der Spiegel reported that Xi'an Bingo Intelligent Aviation Technology was in talks to sell "kamikaze drones" to Russia. The New York Times subsequently reported that Poly Technologies sent sufficient quantities of gunpower to the Barnaul Cartridge Plant to make 80 million rounds of ammunition. China is a key supplier of nitrocellulose, a key ingredient for modern gunpowder, to Russia.

Politico reported in March 2023 that Chinese state-owned weapons manufacturer Norinco shipped assault rifles, drone parts, and body armor to Russia between June and December 2022, with some shipments via third countries including Turkey and the United Arab Emirates. According to the United States, Chinese ammunition has been used on battlefields in Ukraine. In May 2023, the European Union identified that Chinese firms were supplying weapon components to Russia. In 2023, Izhevsk Electromechanical Plant began manufacturing kamikaze drones for the Russian military using Chinese engines and parts. In April 2024, China was reported to have supplied Russia with geospatial intelligence, machine tools for tanks, and propellants for missiles. The same month, the Royal United Services Institute (RUSI) reported that a sanctioned Russian ship transferring weapons from North Korea to Russia was moored at a Chinese shipyard in Zhejiang.

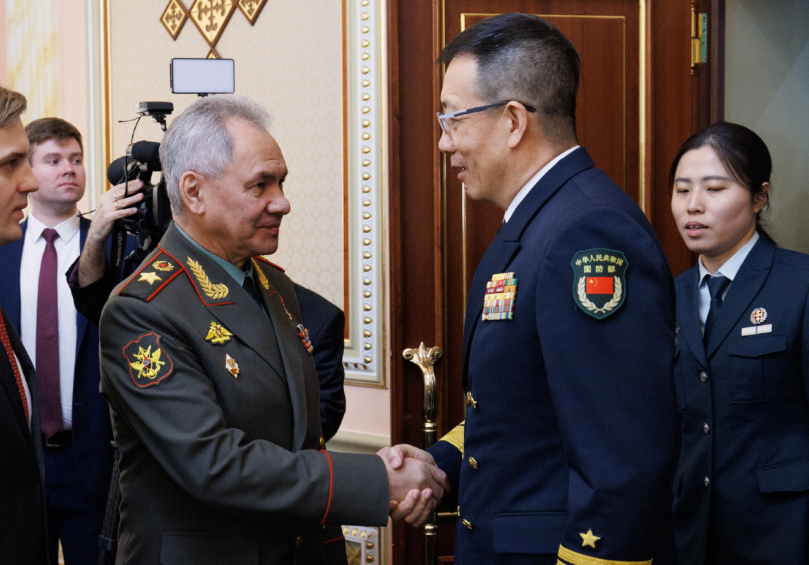
Russian Defense Minister Sergei Shoigu meeting with Chinese Defense Minister Dong Jun, 26 April 2024

On 6 April 2024, Janet Yellen warned China of "significant consequences" if its companies continues to "support Russia's war against Ukraine." In a meeting with local authorities and in a bilateral with Chinese Vice Premier He Lifeng, Yellen highlighted that companies including those in the PRC [People's Republic of China], must not assist Russia in its war against Ukraine. The same month, the US sanctioned a Chinese company for supporting Russia's military through the procurement, development, and proliferation of Russian drones. In July 2024, NATO called China a "decisive enabler of Russia’s war against Ukraine" and called on it to cease its support for Russia's military.

In October 2024, a Western official informed Sky News that there was "clear evidence" of Chinese companies supplying military attack drones to Russia for the Ukraine conflict, marking a potential first in complete weapons systems delivered from China. This development raised alarm for Kyiv and its Western allies, further escalating tensions between Beijing and the West. NATO called the allegations "deeply concerning" and stated that member nations were discussing the situation. The Chinese embassy in London stated it was unaware of the specifics but emphasized that China strictly controlled military exports. NATO emphasized that China must prevent its companies from providing lethal assistance to Russia, warning that continued support could harm China's interests and reputation.

In April 2025, Ukraine imposed sanctions on three Chinese companies that it alleges are involved in the production of 9K720 Iskander missiles.

Remains of a Russian drone in Rivne Oblast. China has been accused of covertly helping Russia build drones used to strike Ukraine.

In a July 2025 meeting with High Representative of the Union for Foreign Affairs and Security Policy Kaja Kallas, Director of the Chinese Communist Party's Central Foreign Affairs Commission Office Wang Yi stated that China did not want to see Russia's loss in Ukraine. The diplomats reported, China fears the United States could focus more on Asia, once the conflict in Europe is over.

In mid-2025, China's exports of key drone components to Russia sharply increased. In September 2026, an investigation by The Telegraph and Politico uncovered internal Russian documents showing a Chinese state-owned firm supplying Russia with materials used to build drones which Russia uses to attack Ukraine. According to experts, the scale of the disguised shipments and military importance of the destination suggested that Chinese officials were aware of the transfers.

=== India ===
In December 2022, Ukrainian foreign minister Dmytro Kuleba criticized India for profiting from buying cheap Russian oil. On 29 December 2022, following the Russian strikes against Ukrainian infrastructure, Kuleba tweeted, "There can be no ‘neutrality’ in the face of such mass war crimes. Pretending to be ‘neutral’ equals taking Russia's side." In June 2024, Ukrainian president Volodymyr Zelenskyy criticized Narendra Modi's visit to Moscow to meet Vladimir Putin as a "huge disappointment and a devastating blow to peace efforts".

In October 2022, the Russian Ministry of Industry and Trade, which is responsible for national defense production, developed confidential plans to spend about 82 billion rupees (about US$1 billion) on the purchase of critical electronic components through channels in India that were hidden from Western governments. In September 2024, it was revealed that Russia had been covertly purchasing components for its arms industry from India. Customs records indicated that India also supplied electronic equipment to the Russian Federation which including UAVs and components for radio-electronic systems. In January 2025, The Guardian reported that India's continued technological trade with Russia was causing concern among Western allies, particularly due to the potential military applications of exported goods.

Putin and Indian Prime Minister Narendra Modi during the 2026 SCO summit in Bishkek, 31 August 2026

In October 2024, it was published by Western media outlets that India has increased exports of critical sanctioned technologies to Russia, according to information from Bloomberg. The volume of Indian exports of goods subject to restrictions (including integrated circuits and machine tools) to Russia exceeded $60 million per month in April and May, twice as much as in previous months of 2024. In July, this amount reached $95 million, becoming the second-largest volume of such exports, surpassed only by China.

According to information from Bloomberg in October 2024, India played a key role as an intermediary in supplying Russia with powerful AI technologies, despite Western sanctions. The key suppliers included the Indian companies Shreya Life Sciences and Hayers Infotech Private Limited, and also included suppliers from Malaysia. Between April and August 2024, Shreya Life Sciences exported 1,111 Dell PowerEdge XE9680 servers with Nvidia processors designed for artificial intelligence to Russia. Russian company Main Chain, which was not under Western sanctions at the time of the transfers, was the recipient through which the high-tech products were distributed to Russia. The value of these deliveries was estimated at $300 million. In total, since February 2022, Shreya and Hayers had supplied Russia with high-tech products worth $434 million.

=== Indonesia ===
In January 2024, Russian émigré and war critic Maxim Galkin was denied entry to Bali, Indonesia, at the request of the Russian government.

In July 2024, Reuters reported that Indonesian state-owned refiner Pertamina was seeking to buy Russian crude oil for the first time since the start of the Russo-Ukrainian war, adding Russian crude grades to its tender lists to buy crude oil for delivery in September 2024.

=== Iran ===
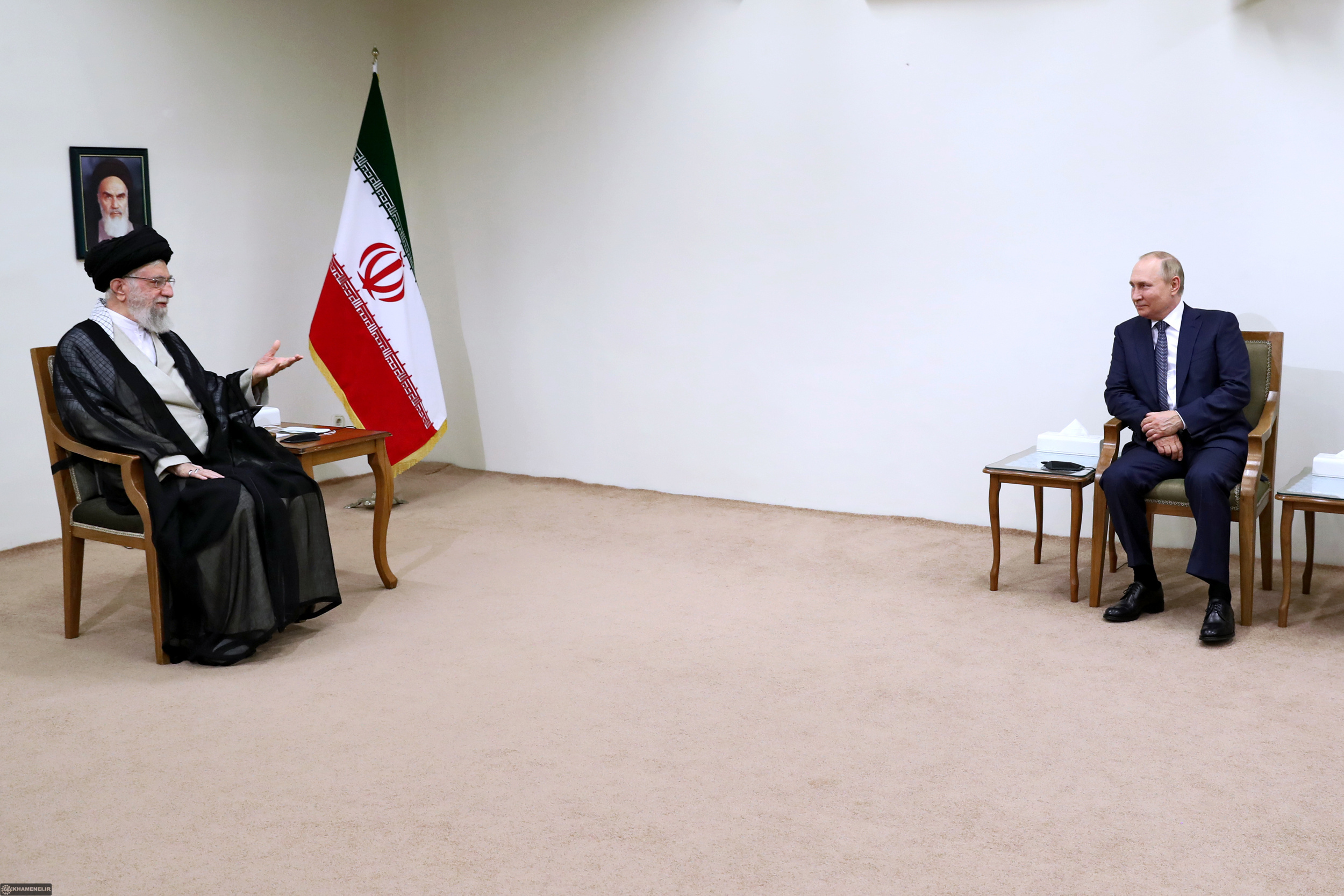
Russian President Vladimir Putin meeting with Iranian Supreme Leader Ali Khamenei in Tehran, 19 July 2022

Amirabad Port, Iran, has been identified as a source of materiel that was shipped northward across the Caspian Sea to the Port of Astrakhan. The Russian-flagged ships Musa Jalil and Begey carried 200 containers of materiel to Russia in a €140-million cash transaction from 10 January 2023, arriving in Astrakhan on 2 February 2023.

Iran has sent to Russia thousands of HESA Shahed 136 drones; Russia has little-to-no domestic UAV industry. Russia plans to build new industrial plants in the Alabuga Special Economic Zone to allow it to produce domestic its own Shahed 136 and Shahed 131 drones, leasing the design from Iran and hoping to produce 6,000 Shahed drones per year by 2025. Russian domestic production has encountered several problems, such as a lack of semiconductors and circuitry required to produce the drones. As of 17 August 2023, the Alabuga Shahed production plant had enough materials to produce 300 drones; Russia domestically produces only four of the 130 necessary components.

France, Germany, and Britain condemned Iran for transferring ballistic missiles to Russia and announced plans to cancel their bilateral air services agreements with Iran, along with pursuing sanctions against Iran Air. This response came after U.S. Secretary of State Antony Blinken revealed that Russia had received Iranian ballistic missiles, which could be used in the Ukraine conflict within weeks. The three countries described the missile transfer as an escalation by Iran and Russia, threatening European security, and urged Iran to stop supporting Russia. Britain also imposed sanctions on Russian cargo ships involved in transporting military supplies from Iran and targeted individuals linked to Iran's missile and drone supply chains.

After the 2026 Israeli–United States strikes on Iran, analyst Serhii Danylov assessed for The New Voice of Ukraine that the strikes had likely eliminated Iran's capability to supply ballistic missiles to Russia.

=== Kazakhstan ===
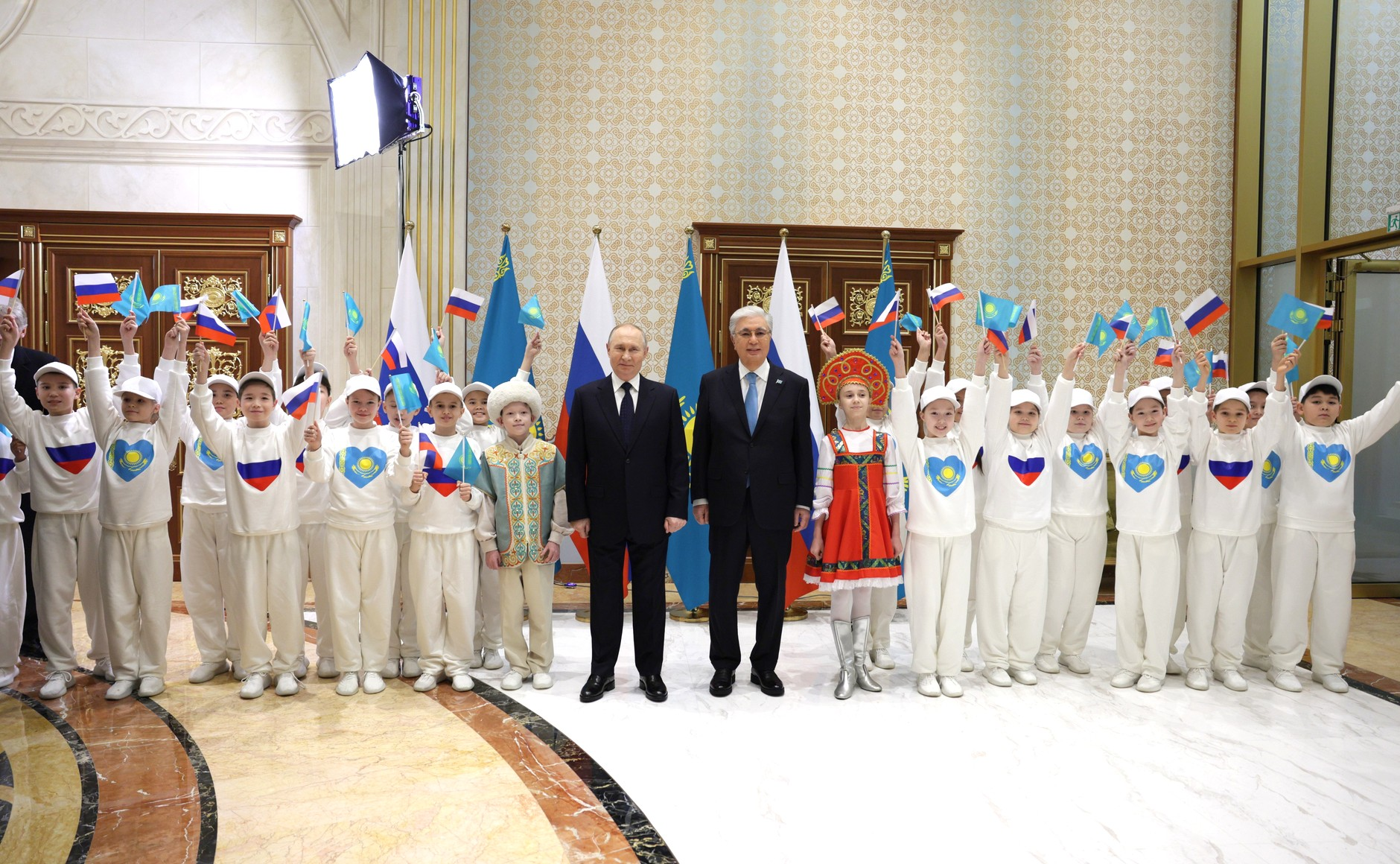
Vladimir Putin with Kazakh President Kassym-Jomart Tokayev during a 2024 state visit to Kazakhstan

In 2022, Kazakhstan agreed to provide the Russian government with the personal data of Russian anti-war activists living in exile. In September 2022, Kazakh authorities detained a Russian journalist wanted in Russia on charges of "discrediting" the Russian military.

Kazakhstan announced that it would extradite Russians wanted for evading mobilization in Russia. In December 2022, Kazakhstan deported a Russian citizen, a former presidential guard, who fled mobilization.

=== Kyrgyzstan ===
In 2023, Kyrgyzstan agreed to share the personal data of exiled anti-war Russians with the Russian government. In June 2023, Kyrgyzstan deported Russian anti-war activist Alexei Rozhkov to Russia.

=== Myanmar ===
In June 2023, Russia was suspected of buying back military supplies it earlier shipped to Myanmar and India.

In July 2023, Russian armed forces were seen using 120 mm mortar rounds that were manufactured in Myanmar. Sources in Myanmar's government told Burmese dissident newspaper The Irrawaddy Russia was using mortar rounds manufactured by the Myanmar Directorate of Defence Industries, and that the Myanmar government was supplying mortar rounds to Russia.

=== North Korea ===
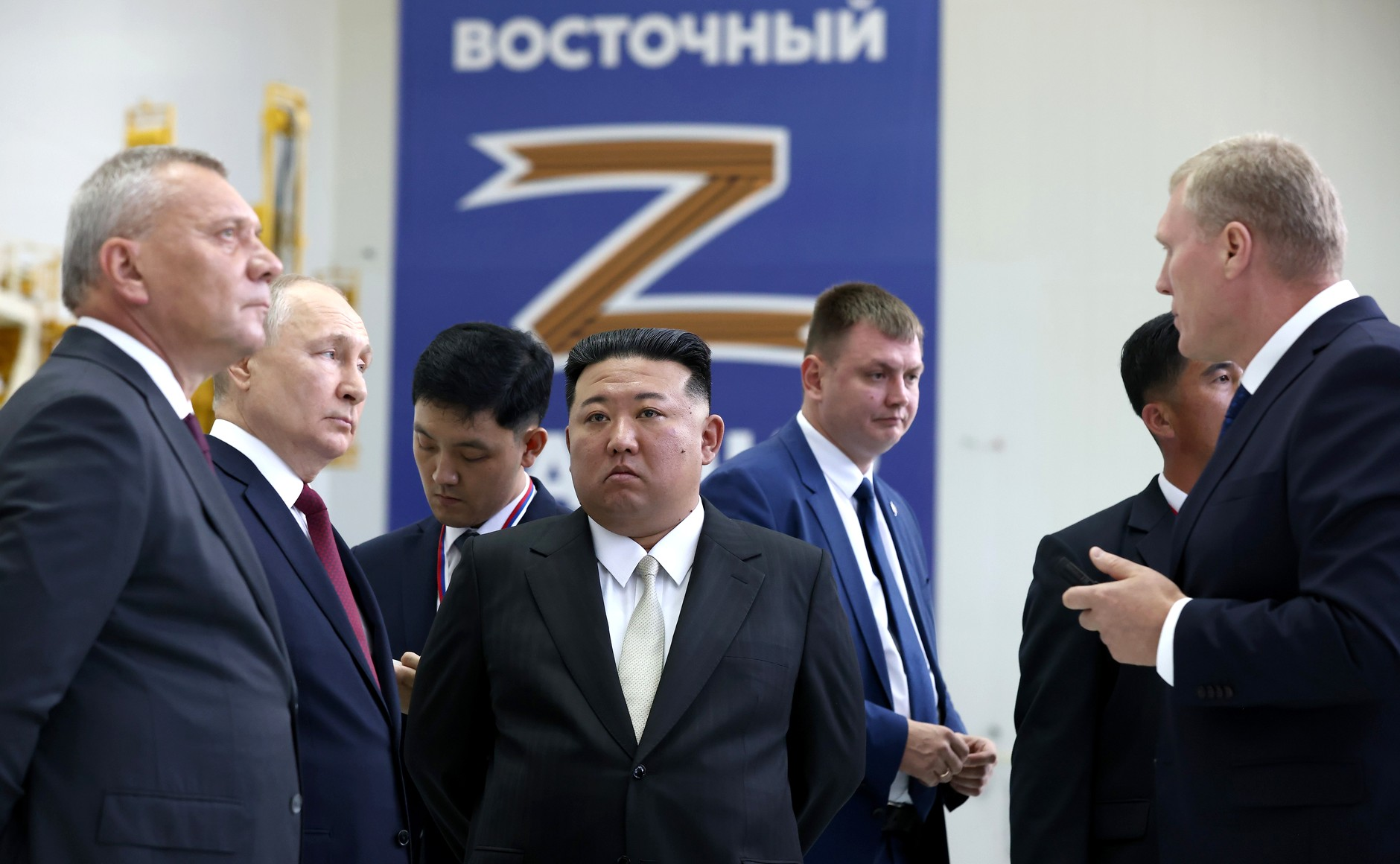
North Korean leader Kim Jong Un with Putin during Kim's visit to Russia, 13 September 2023

US intelligence and satellite imaging reported Russia and North Korea are engaged in a "Food for Arms" trade policy, under which Russia exports grain—mostly plundered from Russian-occupied territories of Ukraine—in exchange for North Korean small arms, artillery, and ammunition. Russia had lifted most or all of its sanctions against North Korea, including its gas embargo, since the start of the war. North Korea has also offered diplomatic support for Russia; General Secretary of the Workers' Party of Korea Kim Jong Un publicly stated North Korea would "always stand in the same trench, together with the army and the people of Russia". On Russia Day 2023, Kim offered his country's "full support and solidarity to the Russian people in their all-out struggle for implementing the sacred cause to preserve the sovereign rights, development and interests of their country against the imperialists' high-handed and arbitrary practices". North Korea has also issued support for the Russian government during the Wagner Group rebellion and blamed the war in Ukraine on the US's "hegemonic policy".

On 27 July 2023, during North Korea's 70th celebration of its Day of Victory in the Great Fatherland Liberation War, Russian Defense Minister Sergei Shoigu was received in Pyongyang to join the military parade. This was the first time a Russian defense minister had visited North Korea since the fall of the Soviet Union in 1991. During his visit, Shoigu and Kim promised closer military cooperation between the two countries, and Kim showed Shoigu North Korean nuclear missiles. Afterward, Shoigu and Kim toured a weapons exhibition, as Russia seeks to outfit its declining supplies with North Korean weaponry and ammunition.

According to reports from the US Department of Defense, about 10,000 North Korean soldiers had arrived in the border region of Kursk by the end of October 2024. Purportedly among the North Korean units is also Colonel General Kim Yong Bok, the commander of North Korea's special forces and a close confidant of Kim Jong Un. On 1 November 2024, North Korean minister of foreign affairs Choe Son-hui visited Moscow and said that Kim Jong Un has already ordered to firmly and non-hesitantly give strong support to the Russian army and people since its invasion of Ukraine. She also told Russian minister of foreign affairs Sergei Lavrov that North Korea will stand with the Russians until its victory.

=== United Arab Emirates ===
Vladimir Putin and UAE President Mohammed bin Zayed Al Nahyan at the Kremlin, 29 January 2026

In May 2022, European Parliament members suggested that the UAE should be blacklisted for allowing sanctioned Russian oligarchs and other officials to invest in properties and businesses in Dubai.

In May 2023, the EU identified that UAE firms could supply weapon components to Russia. The EU banned export of dual-use goods targeting two UAE-based companies, I Jet Global and Success Aviation Services. The EU said that "third countries whose jurisdiction is demonstrated to be at continued and particularly high risk of being used for circumvention for the benefit of Russia" will face total ban on imports from EU military and high tech kit, which could include China and UAE, if they continued arming Russia. Both China and the UAE had refuted such claims, even though the UAE had given financial support to the Russian Federation during the course of the war.

The UAE-based network was accused of funneling $300 million in gold profits to Russia and supporting its war against Ukraine. The UAE became the biggest hub for Russian gold since war started.

In 2024, exiled Russian rapper and war critic Morgenshtern had his concerts in the UAE cancelled and was denied entry to Dubai, where he had lived for several years, after Russian authorities blacklisted him and labeled him a "foreign agent."

=== Vietnam ===
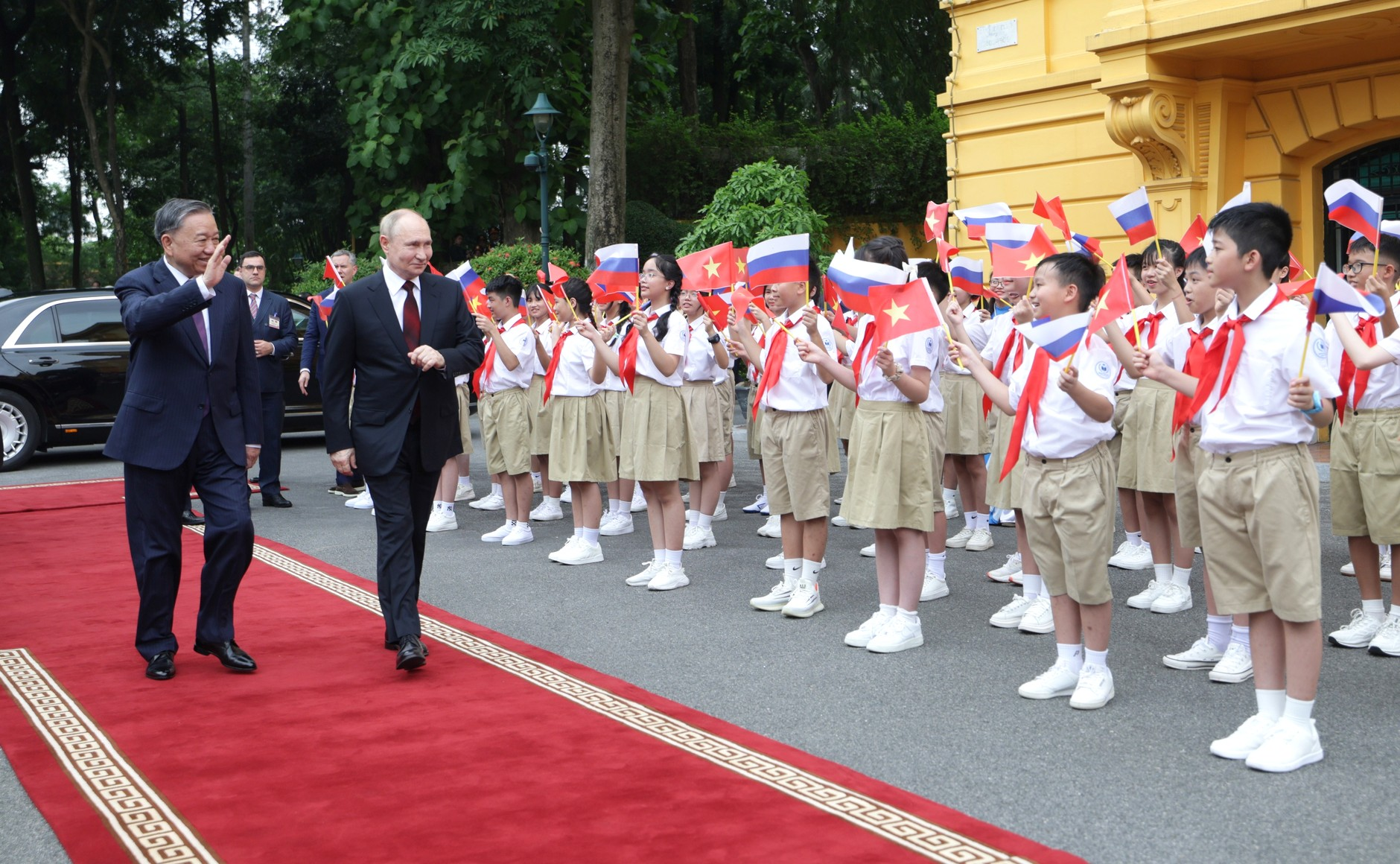
Putin and Vietnamese president Tô Lâm in Hanoi, Vietnam, June 2024

Since 2022, at the Kremlin's request, Vietnam has deported several Russian citizens living in Vietnam because they criticized the Russian invasion of Ukraine. Several public opinion brigades' pages on Facebook, originally established to disseminate propaganda for the Communist Party of Vietnam, circulated disinformation in support of the invasion.

In March 2022 and February 2023, Vietnam abstained from UN votes to condemn the Russian invasion of Ukraine. The Vietnamese government told reporters not to say "invasion", and to minimize coverage of the war in Ukraine.

== Europe ==
=== Belarus ===
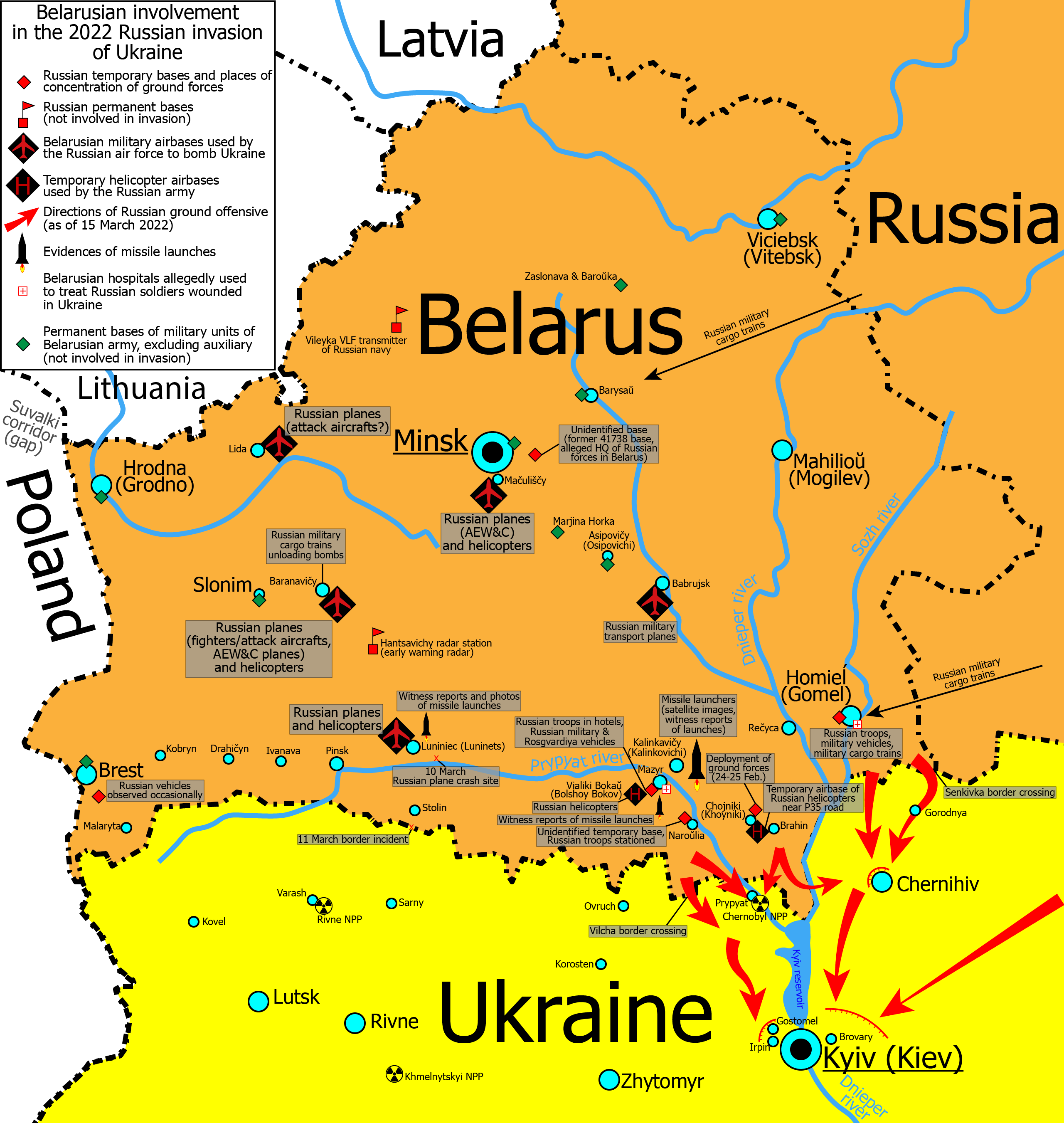
Map of Russian military activities in Belarus as of 15 March 2022

Belarus, a close ally of Russia, has supported Russia in its invasion of Ukraine. Before the start of the offensive, Belarus allowed the Russian Armed Forces to perform weeks-long military drills on its territory; the Russian troops did not leave Belarus after the drills were supposed to finish. Belarus allowed Russia to stage part of the invasion from its territory, giving Russia the shortest-possible land route to Ukraine's capital Kyiv. The Russian forces withdrew within two months, ending land-based military operations originating from Belarus and resulting in Ukraine's recapture of territory on its side of the Ukraine/Belarus border. Despite this, the situation along the border remained tense; Ukraine closed the border checkpoints leading into Belarus, bar special cases.

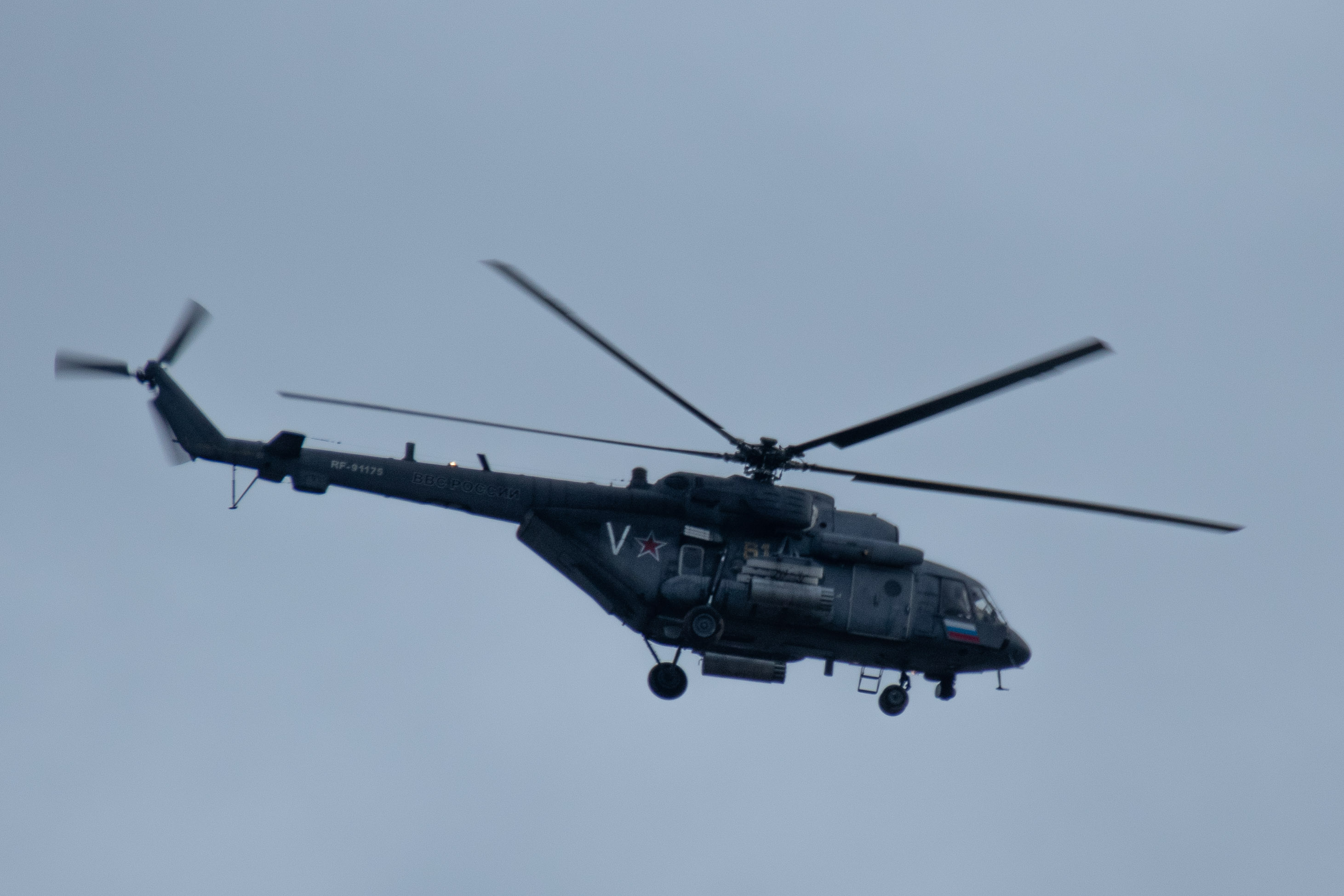
Russian helicopter Mil Mi-8AMTSh (Mi-171Sh) in Minsk, 23 February 2022

Belarus initially denied involvement with the conflict but has since said it allowed Russian missile launchers stationed on its territory to shoot at Ukrainian targets. Several reports from the Belarusian opposition and Armed Forces of Ukraine said Belarusian troops were fighting with Russians in Ukraine but Belarus's leader Aleksander Lukashenko dismissed them and said the Belarusian Armed Forces (BAF) would not directly participate in the conflict. As of early 2023, the BAF had not been involved in fighting against Ukraine and had remained within Belarus during the conflict. Lukashenko stated he would not send soldiers into Ukraine unless attacked first.

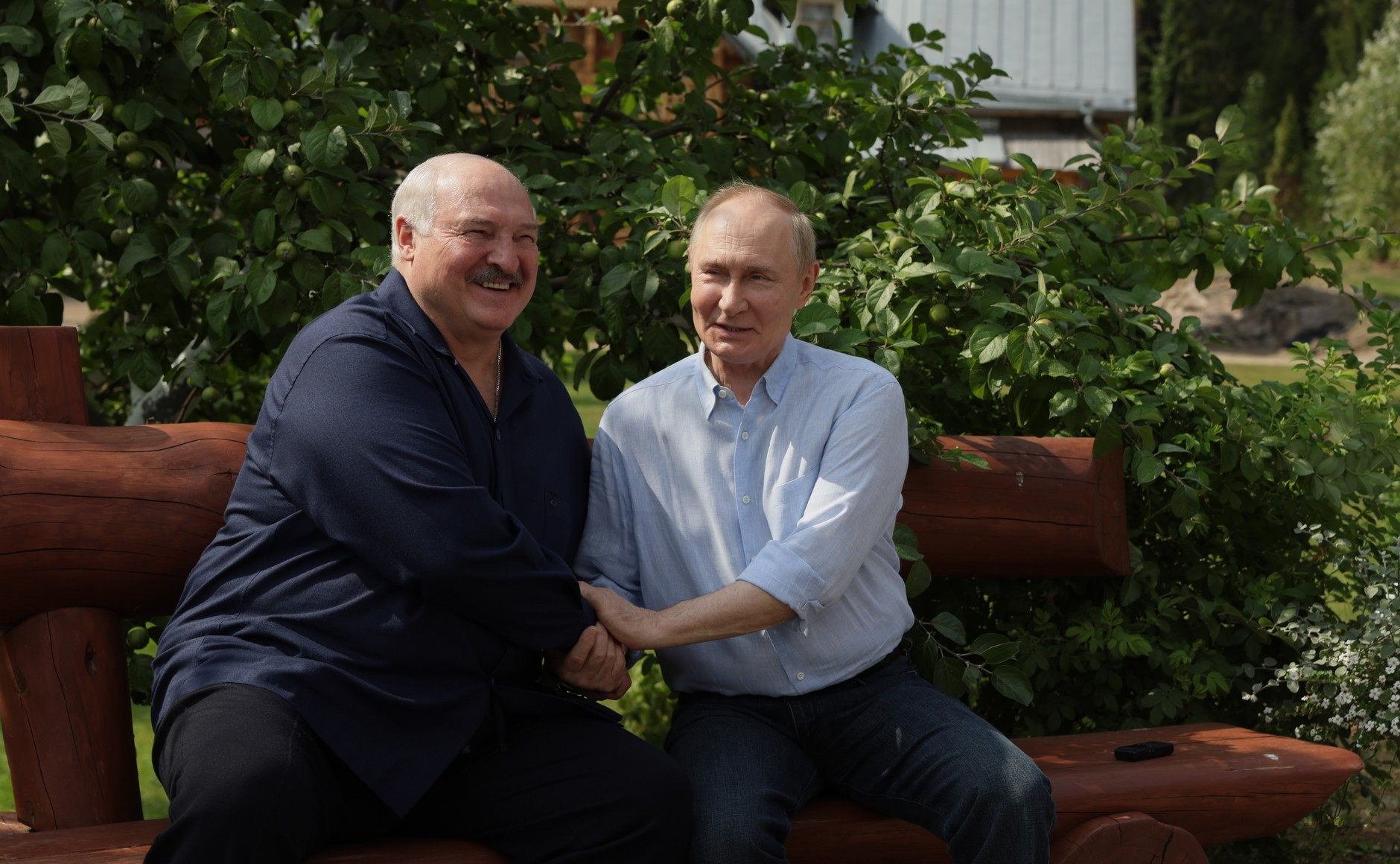
Putin meeting with Alexander Lukashenko at the Valaam Monastery, Russia, 1 August 2025

According to the Ukrainian foreign ministry, Lukashenko assured Ukrainian President Volodymyr Zelenskyy at the start of the invasion he would not to involve his nation's armed forces on the side of Russia. In early 2023, Lukashenko stated Ukraine had offered to formalize this arrangement with a non-aggression pact.

The involvement of Belarus was condemned in Western countries; the EU, the US, the UK, Canada, and Japan imposed sanctions against Belarus. According to Chatham House, Belarus's participation in the military conflict is unpopular among the general population; protests were held on 27 February, the day of the constitutional referendum that asked the populace to revoke Belarus's non-nuclear-country status, but were quickly dispersed. Hackers targeted Belarusian government agencies and the country's critical infrastructure with the aim of disrupting the Russian war effort in Belarus.

In the early days of the invasion, Belarus was also involved in peace initiatives, holding Russo-Ukrainian talks on its border. Despite some preliminary agreements, the talks did not result in a lasting ceasefire.

Belarusian territory has also been used to launch missiles into Ukraine.

=== Slovakia ===
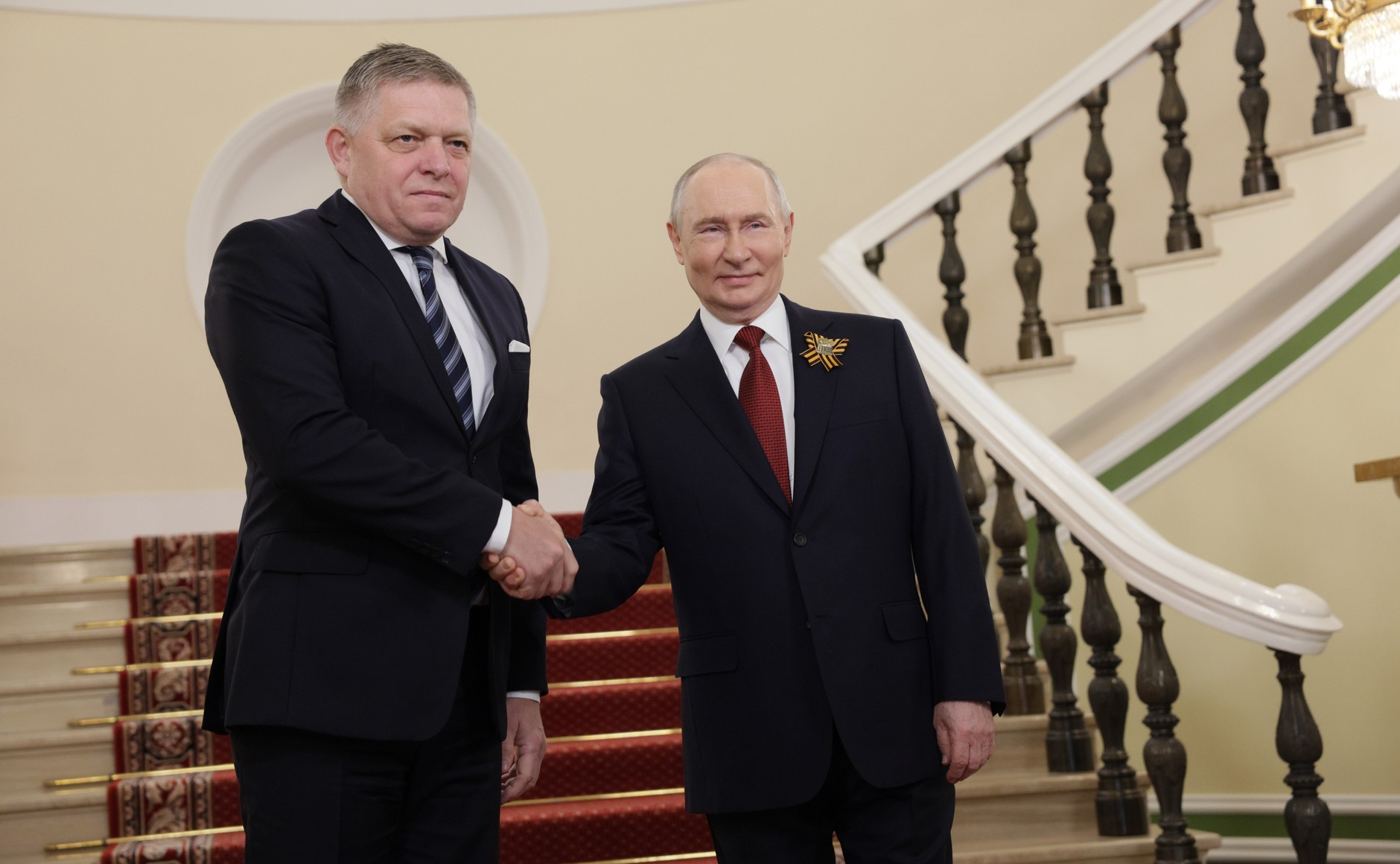
Slovak Prime Minister Robert Fico meeting Vladimir Putin in the Moscow Kremlin, Russia, 9 May 2026

Following the September 2023 parliamentary election in Slovakia, the country underwent a major foreign policy realignment regarding the Russo-Ukrainian War under its newly elected prime minister, Robert Fico, a veteran populist politician who previously served three terms as prime minister.

Prior to this political shift, Slovakia had stood as one of Ukraine's most proactive allies relative to its size, ranking among the top European donors in gross domestic product percentage by transferring nearly €700 million in critical military assets, including its entire fleet of MiG-29 fighter jets, one Mil Mi-2 helicopter, four Mil Mi-17 helicopters, an S-300PMU air defense system and thousands of Soviet-era munitions.

During the 2023 campaign, Fico argued that the war had actually begun in 2014 when, according to him, "Ukrainian Nazis and fascists started to murder the Russian citizens" in Donbas and Luhansk, mirroring Russian propaganda narratives about the conflict. Upon taking power in October 2023, his administration officially halted all state military aid shipments to Kyiv.

Politically, the Slovak government consistently voiced strong opposition to European Union sanctions against Russia, labeling them self-destructive and using its veto power in the European Council to block or delay subsequent sanctions packages. In June 2025, the Slovak parliament passed a non-binding resolution instructing the government to oppose new anti-Russian sanctions in international forums.

In a speech delivered in the National Council of Slovakia, Fico dismissed the objective to "bring Russia to its knees," and stated that the World knows "Russians only get on their knees to tie their shoelaces".

The Slovak parliamentary delegation, led by Deputy Speakers of the National Council of the Slovak Republic Andrej Danko and Tibor Gašpar, meeting with Russian officials at the Federation Council in Moscow, 1 January 2025

Fico deepened diplomatic engagement with Moscow through high-level visits, including a December 2024 meeting with Russian President Vladimir Putin to discuss energy transit. He further demonstrated alignment by traveling to Moscow as the sole EU head of government to attend Victory Day commemorations in both May 2025 and May 2026.

When Ukraine refused to renew its long-term Russian natural gas transit contract upon its expiration on 1 January 2025, Fico threatened retaliatory actions. The transit halt stripped Slovakia of approximately €500 million in annual transit fees and forced Bratislava to secure more expensive alternative import routes, including shipments via the TurkStream pipeline through Turkey. In response, Fico threatened to cut off Slovakia's emergency electricity exports to Ukraine, which led Ukrainian President Volodymyr Zelenskyy to accuse Fico of opening a "second energy front" against Ukraine on Moscow's behalf, an accusation Bratislava rejected.

Energy relations broke down further in February 2026 over an oil transit dispute when Russian strikes near the Druzhba pipeline stopped the flow of crude oil to Slovakia. Citing satellite images, Fico accused Zelenskyy of deliberate lies regarding the extent of the damage, claiming the Ukrainian president was acting slowly on repairs to politically manipulate the crisis and stating that his distrust of the Ukrainian leader was so absolute that "he doesn't even believe President Zelenskyy has a nose between his eyes". Claiming Ukraine was using the disruption for political blackmail, Fico ordered the immediate suspension of Slovakia's emergency electricity exports and diesel supplies to Ukraine, cutting off critical power grid stabilization support during a winter period of widespread blackout risks.

In September 2026, during the multilateral Pathways to Peace conference in Toronto, Slovakia refused to join a global declaration, the Toronto Pledge, aimed at securing the safe return of forcibly deported Ukrainian children. Slovakia stood out as the only European Union member state among the 27 EU nations to refused to sign the pledge.

Throughout his tenure, Fico has routinely criticized NATO policy, blamed Western nations for escalating the conflict and stated that Ukraine must cede territory to Russia to achieve peace, arguing that regaining its lost land on the battlefield is impossible. Fico earlier compared the German army to the Nazi-era Wehrmacht when discussing the possibility that allied German troops would be deployed in Slovakia as part of NATO collective defense.

=== South Ossetia ===
South Ossetia (a partially recognized state in the South Caucasus) has assisted Russia's invasion of Ukraine. President Anatoly Bibilov announced on 26 March 2022 that South Ossetian troops had been sent to assist Russia in its invasion of Ukraine.

=== Turkey ===
Vladimir Putin and Turkish President Recep Tayyip Erdoğan in Bishkek during the 2026 SCO summit, 1 September 2026

In 2022, Turkish President Recep Tayyip Erdoğan stated that Turkey would not join the international sanctions on Russia, citing the country's import dependency as a reason. Turkey received almost half of its gas from Russia. Erdoğan and Putin planned for Turkey to become an energy hub for all of Europe. According to Aura Săbăduș, a senior energy journalist focusing on the Black Sea region, "Turkey would accumulate gas from various producers — Russia, Iran, and Azerbaijan, [liquefied natural gas] and its own Black Sea gas — and then whitewash it and relabel it as Turkish. European buyers wouldn’t know the origin of the gas."

Turkey has, even after four years of Russian full-scale military invasion and occupation of Ukraine, continuously refused to impose any sanctions against Russia, being the only NATO member state that has not done so.

In 2024, Washington warned Turkey of potential consequences if it did not reduce exports of US military-linked hardware to Russia, critical for Moscow's war efforts. Assistant Commerce Secretary Matthew Axelrod met with Turkish officials in an effort to halt this trade and emphasized the need to restrict the flow of U.S.-origin components that are indispensable to the Russian armed forces. The issue strained NATO relations, as Turkey increased trade with Russia despite US and EU sanctions since Russia's 2022 invasion of Ukraine.

== Former ==
=== Ba'athist Syria ===
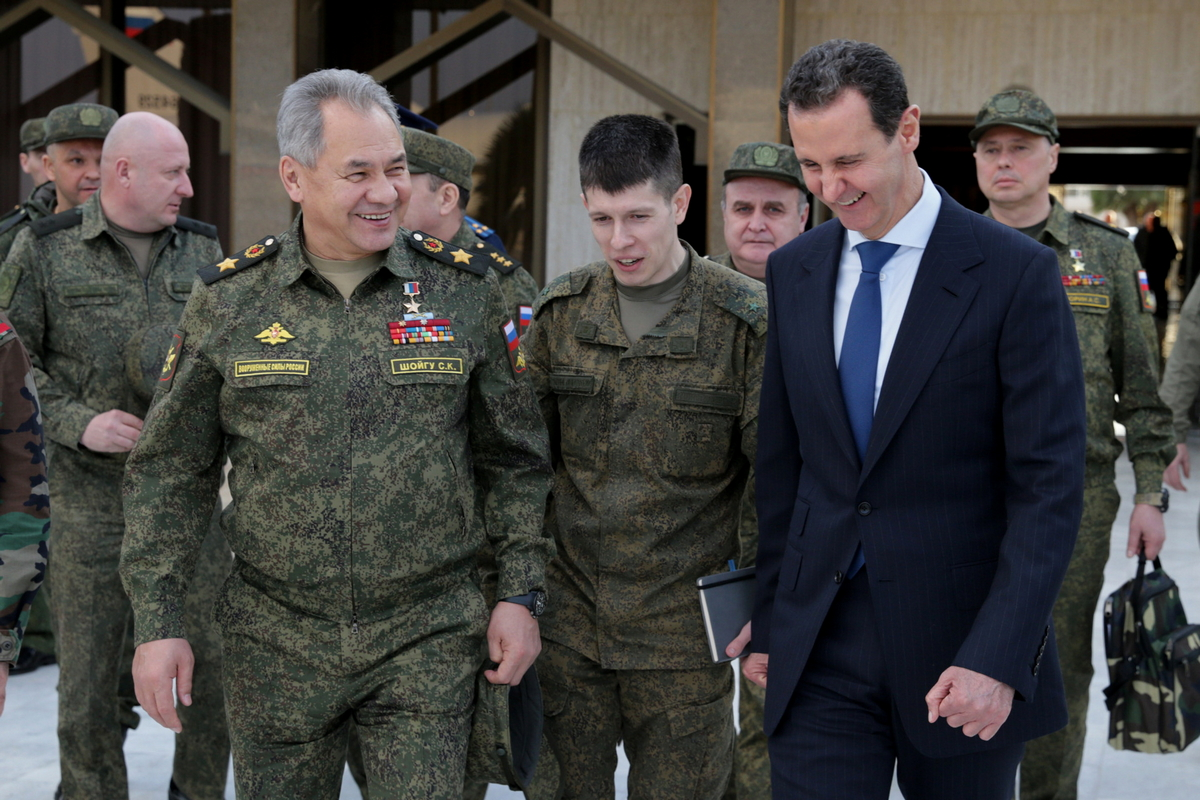
Russian Minister of Defence Sergey Shoigu with Bashar al-Assad in Syria, February 2022

Ba'athist Syria (before the fall of the Assad regime), a "staunch ally of Moscow", supported Russia's invasion of Ukraine under the Bashar al-Assad regime. Russia has reportedly recruited Syrians to participate in the Russian invasion of Ukraine. The Assad regime itself recruited paid volunteers among its soldiers to fight for Russia in its invasion of Ukraine, according to a 2022 report by The Guardian.

=== Venezuela ===
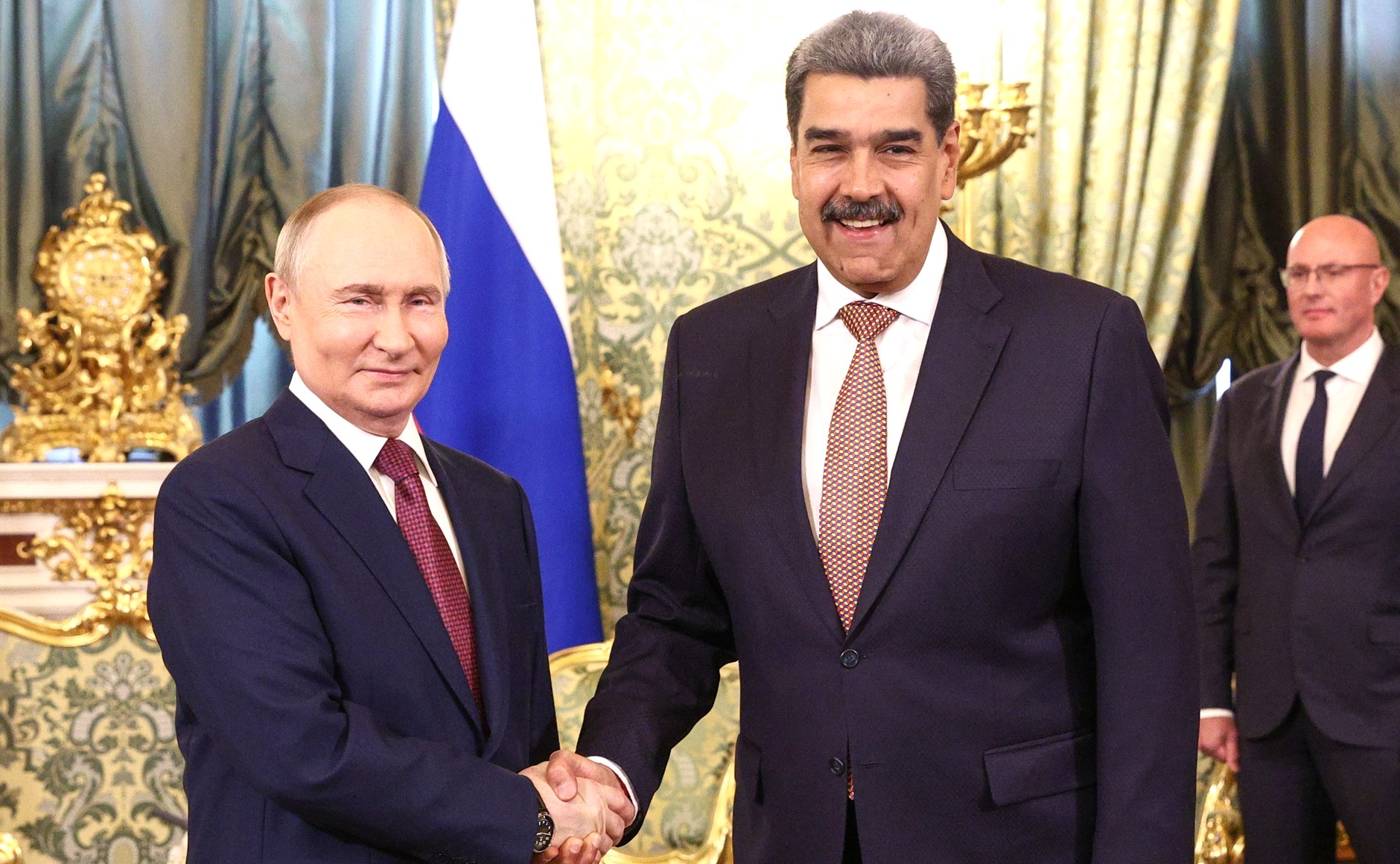
Putin with Nicolás Maduro in Moscow, May 2025

Venezuela, under President Nicolás Maduro (before the 2026 United States intervention in Venezuela), provided diplomatic and political support to Russia during the Russian invasion of Ukraine. In February 2022, Maduro expressed solidarity with Russian president Vladimir Putin, while the Venezuelan government blamed the United States and NATO for contributing to the conflict. Venezuela's foreign ministry accused Western governments of undermining the Minsk agreements and threatening Russian security, although it also called for a diplomatic resolution to the war.

Venezuela maintained close relations with Moscow, although its ability to provide material assistance to Russia was limited by economic difficulties and international sanctions. Venezuela was unable to participate in several United Nations General Assembly votes concerning Ukraine because its voting rights were suspended over unpaid membership dues. In May 2025, Maduro visited Moscow and signed a strategic partnership agreement with Putin, strengthening cooperation in energy, diplomacy, and international organizations, including joint opposition to unilateral sanctions. Despite this cooperation, Venezuela did not officially deploy military forces to Ukraine, and its support remained primarily diplomatic and political.

=== Hungary ===
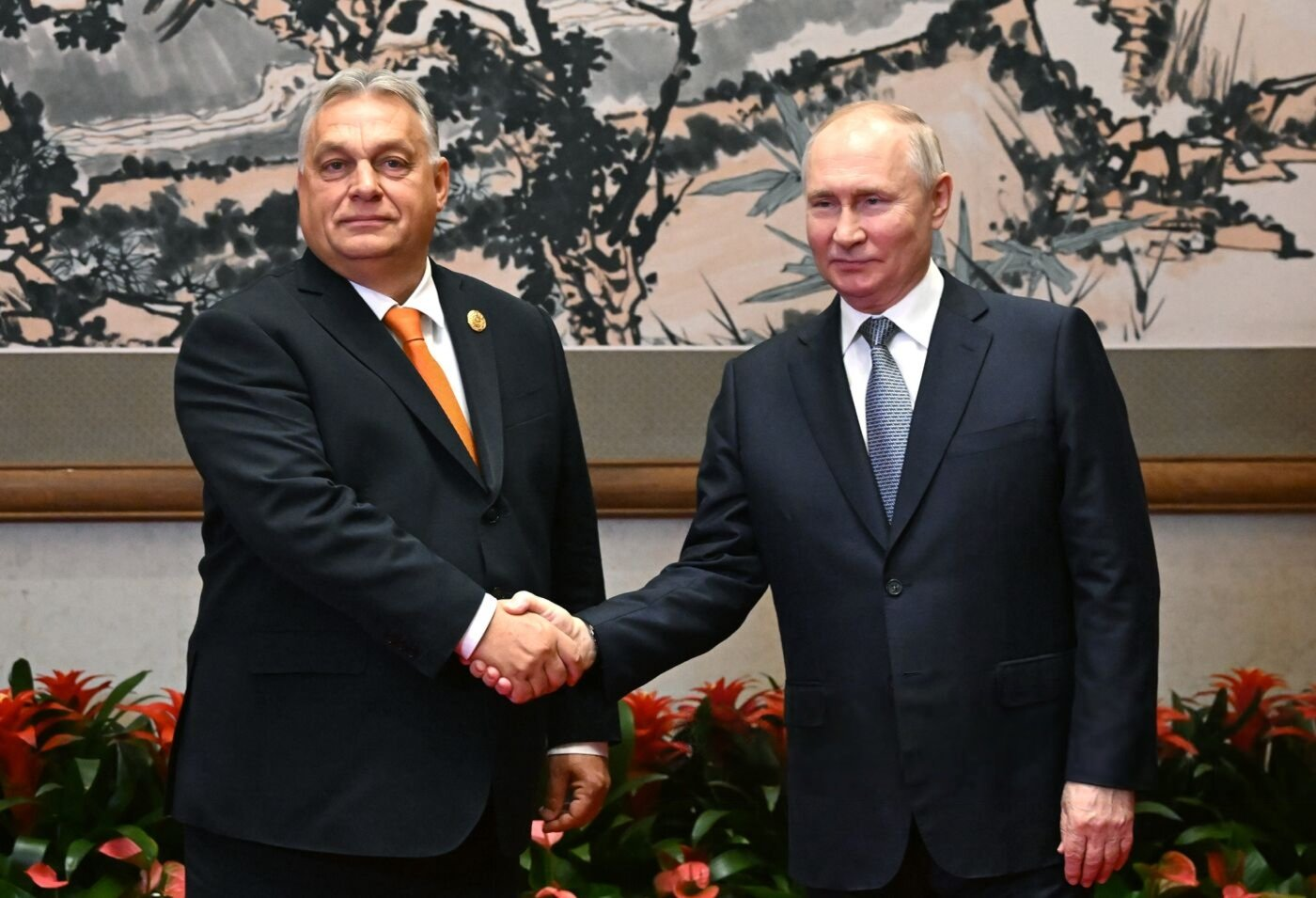
Putin and Viktor Orbán in Beijing, October 2023

Hungary, under Prime Minister Viktor Orbán (before the 2026 Hungarian parliamentary election), has maintained close diplomatic and economic relations with Russia throughout the Russian invasion of Ukraine, despite being a member of the European Union and NATO. Although Hungary has supported some EU sanctions against Russia, Orbán's government has opposed Western military assistance to Ukraine and repeatedly delayed or blocked EU initiatives supporting Kyiv. Orbán has advocated negotiations and an immediate ceasefire, while criticizing the continuation of Western military support for Ukraine.

In July 2024, Orbán visited Vladimir Putin in Moscow as part of a self-described peace mission, drawing criticism from EU officials who emphasized that he was not representing the European Union. In February 2026, Hungary blocked a new package of EU sanctions against Russia and a €90 billion loan for Ukraine amid a dispute over Russian oil deliveries through the Druzhba pipeline. On 24 February 2026, Hungary abstained from a United Nations General Assembly resolution reaffirming Ukraine's sovereignty and territorial integrity and calling for an immediate ceasefire, becoming the only EU member state not to vote in favor.

== Sanction circumvention through third countries ==
In 2023, the European Union identified that Chinese and UAE firms were supplying weapon components to Russia.

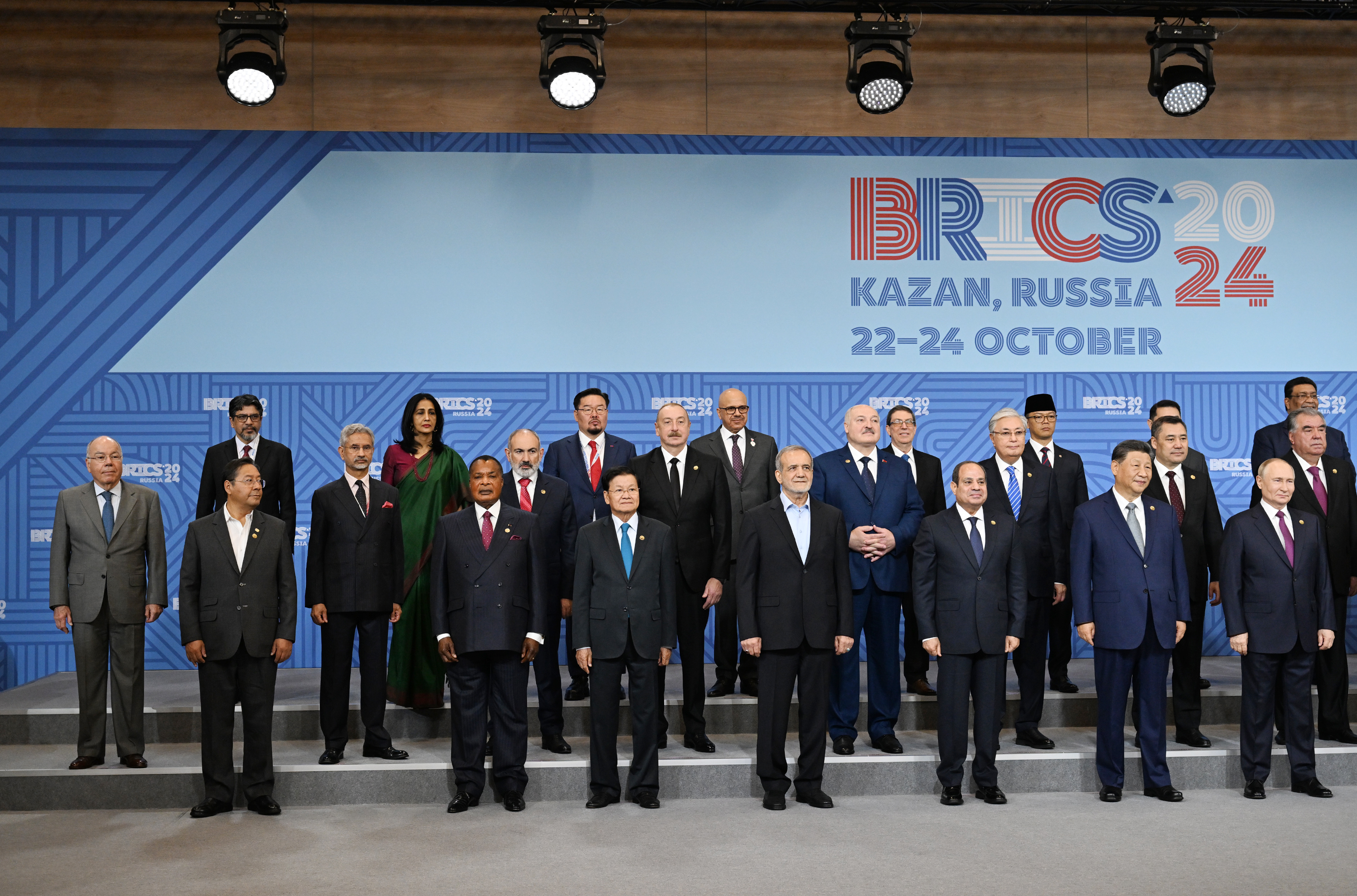
Putin and Chinese leader Xi Jinping at the 16th BRICS summit in Kazan, Russia. Most of the Global South countries took a neutral position towards the war and maintained good relations with Russia.

On 15 March 2023, the EU and Joe Biden officials shared a concern that Russia continued to access confidential foreign chips and technology through countries like the UAE, China, Iran, Turkey and Kazakhstan, which were acting as intermediaries. The UAE and China, which did not have any sanctions on Russia, were also helping Russia to access the U.S. technology and equipment.

Russia imports sensitive electronics, machinery, auto parts, and defence equipment from India. Trade like oil sales has surged since 2022, boosting revenue for Russian state-owned companies. To bypass sanctions and manage its currency surplus, Russia pays in rupees, supporting both civilian and military needs. Retuers reported in July 2025 that according to Indian customs data, an Indian company shipped military use explosive compounds valued at $1.4 million to Russia in December 2024.

In July 2025, U.S. President Donald Trump criticized India over its continued oil trade with Russia despite Western sanctions. On 14 July, he threatened tariffs and secondary sanctions on countries purchasing Russian oil if Russia did not agree to a ceasefire within 50 days.

Russia has continued to make billions from fossil fuel exports to the West. Ukraine's Western allies have paid Russia more for its hydrocarbons than they have given Ukraine in aid. In 2025 Slovakia and Hungary rejected an EU plan to phase out deliveries of Russian gas via Turkey by 2028. "Laundromat refineries" in Turkey and India process Russian crude and sell the refined fuel on to sanctioning countries. Russia has also developed partnerships with India and UAE that actively support its efforts to evade sanctions.

Since the outbreak of the invasion, the Maldives has offered refuge to Russian tourists and oligarchs, allowing and increasing Russian tourist flights into the country. Maldives' economy is dependent on tourism and has rejected cutting ties to Russian tourists.

Russian President Vladimir Putin, Indian Prime Minister Narendra Modi and Chinese leader Xi Jinping at the 18th BRICS Summit in New Delhi, India, 12 September 2026

In 2022, 400,000 US-made semiconductors worth $53.6 million were shipped to Russia via Maldives, accounting for almost 20% of Maldives's exports. Maldives has no native semiconductor manufacturers; all of its exports are the results of Russian shell companies operating in Maldives. These companies import semiconductors into the country and re-exported them to Russia to circumvent semiconductor sanctions. Most of these shell companies are headquartered in Hong Kong; Maldives, a member of the Belt and Road Initiative, was strengthening its relationship with China.

From 2015 to 2021, average trade between Russia and Turkey in 45 military-linked materials was $28 million per year; the figure in 2022 was over $52.6 million; and from January to October 2023 was $158 million.

== Other trade ==
From January 2022 to mid-2025, the United States imported $24.51 billion of Russian goods, mainly fertilizers, enriched uranium and plutonium, and palladium.

From February 2022 to March 2026, the EU imported €317 billion($365 billion) worth of goods from Russia. This is €116 billion ($134 billion) more than the aid they have given to Ukraine, which, in March 2026, totaled €201 billion($232 billion). The EU also remains the largest buyer of Russian liquefied natural gas, totalling 49% of all Russian exports.

== See also ==
- Sanctioning Russia Act
- List of heads of state and government who have visited Russia during the Russo-Ukrainian war (2022–present)
- Government and intergovernmental reactions to the Russian invasion of Ukraine
- Hungary and the Russian invasion of Ukraine
- International Sponsors of War
