= International Sponsors of War =

Ukrainian list of Russian-aligned companies and individuals

International Sponsors of War (Ukrainian: Міжнародні спонсори війни, romanized: Mižnarodni sponsory vijny) was a publicly available list of companies and individuals maintained by the Ukrainian National Agency on Corruption Prevention (NACP) in connection with the Russo-Ukrainian War, particularly the Russian invasion of Ukraine. It had no legal standing but was nonetheless impactful. By December 2023, the list included 46 companies from 17 countries and 261 individuals who, by doing business with Russia, contribute to Russian revenues and ultimately Russian military budget in their ongoing war with Ukraine. (Note: According to Leave Russia, the number of identified foreign companies still operating in Russia in December 2023 is higher, around 1,600.) The list is contrasted with international boycott of Russia when by 2023 more than 1000 companies withdrew or divested themselves from Russia following the invasion of Ukraine. NACP viewed the list as a reputational instrument for elements of global supply chains, aimed at reducing Russia's financial and technological capability to damage Ukraine. In September 2022 the list was included into London Stock Exchange Group's database. Some companies among International Sponsors of War are also restricted in other countries.

Inclusion on the list was arbitrary and decided by the NACP on a one to one basis. Some companies have been removed from the list, as they ceased business with Russia and condemned the war. In June 2023, media outlets also reported the removal of five Greek tanker companies from the list, however the NACP kept them as they did not publicly condemn the invasion. In March 2024, following diplomatic pressure, the list of International Sponsors of War was removed from public access by the NACP and its data were moved to the Interdepartmental Working Group on Implementation of the State Sanctions Policy (IWG).

== Companies ==
=== List ===
Name	Country	Branch	Notes	Date
Alibaba Group Holding Limited	China	Various	Through AliExpress in Russia the company provides an international platform for the sale of foreign goods.	2023
Auchan	France	Retail	According to NACP, after the invasion of Ukraine, Auchan's Russian subsidiary continued to pay taxes to the Russian budget, supply goods to the Russian military in the occupied Ukrainian territories under the guise of humanitarian aid and help Russian military offices recruit conscripts. In 2021 Auchan generated 3.2 billion euros in Russia, 10% of total revenue at Auchan Retail.	2022
Barry Callebaut	Switzerland	Cocoa and chocolate	Continuing to operate 3 factories in Russia, paid $33 million in taxes in 2022 and their products are used in dry rations of the Russian army.	2024
Bacardi	Bermuda	Liquors	The company's Russian division, Bacardi Rus', paid more than 1.2 billion rubles (more than US$12 million) in income tax to the Russian budget.	2023
Bolero Group	Georgia	Wines	Increased exports of Georgian wine to Russia and dealings with sanctioned businessmen. Owner is a Russian citizen.	2023
Bonduelle	France	Food	Although the company stated it suspended all investment projects in Russia and decided to dedicate all profits from sales in Russia to the future reconstruction of Ukraine, it also announced its intention to continue operation in Russia.	2023
Buzzi Unicem	Italy	Construction	Buzzi Unicem operates in Russia through SLK Cement LLC which cooperates with the Russian Ministry of Defense and supplies its products to major Russian state enterprises, such as Rosneft and Rosatom.	2023
Camozzi Group	Italy	Automative solutions	Continuing activity in occupied Crimea.	2023
China National Offshore Oil Corporation (CNOOC)	China	Oil	Arctic oil investment.	2023
China National Petroleum Corporation	China	Oil	Investment in Russia.	2023
China Railway Construction Corporation	China	Construction	Construction of Moscow Metro Bolshaya Koltsevaya line stations and Blagoveshchensk–Heihe Bridge.	2023
China State Construction Engineering Corporation	China	Construction	In 2021, the company's subsidiaries in Russia (Kitaystroy LLC and Chinastroy front LLC) paid 192.6 million and 8.5 million rubles in taxes, respectively. After the Russian invasion of Ukraine the company continued its cooperation with Russia.	2023
CK Birla Group	India	Transport technology	NBC Bearings, a brand of National Engineering Industries Limited (NEI), itself part of the CK Birla Group, became an alternative to Western suppliers on Russian market. The share of the company's imports to Russia amounted to US$12.3 million from April 2022 to March 2023.	2023
Comnav Technology Ltd.	China	Navigation and radar equipment	The company supplies navigation and radar equipment for the Russian GLONASS system used by Russian and Iranian-made drones in the invasion of Ukraine. From February 24 to December 30, 2022, the company made 73 deliveries to Russia.	2023
Dahua Technology	China	Video surveillance equipment	In 2021 taxes paid by the company to the Russian budget amounted to US$1.12 million. The United States imposed export controls on Dahua chips and the Federal Communications Commission listed the company among those whose products pose a threat to national security. The United Kingdom and Australia banned their public authorities from installing Dahua surveillance cameras.	2023
Danieli	Italy	Industrial equipment	According to NACP, the available information suggests that Danieli cooperates, directly or indirectly, with the Russian military industry enterprises and its customers include Severstal, Evraz and Magnitogorsk Iron and Steel Works.	2022
DP World	United Arab Emirates	Logistics	In June 2023, DP World signed an agreement with the Russian state corporation Rosatom in the field of container transportation and the development of the Northern Sea Route.	2023
DMG Mori Aktiengesellschaft	Germany	Machine tools	DMG Mori Rus LLC operates a machine tool plant in Ulyanovsk, Ulyanovsk Machine Tool Plant LLC.	2023
eKassir Osaühing	Estonia	Payment equipment	Parent company of Russian Ekassir which facilitates operations of sanctioned Russian banks (Sberbank, VTB, etc.).	2023
ESAB (Elektriska Svetsnings-Aktiebolaget)	United States; Sweden	Electric welding	Continuing to operate and expand business in Russia.	2024
Fluxys	Belgium	Gas operator	Promoting the export of Russian LNG.	2023
Great Wall Motor	China	Automotive industry	As of 2023, Russia is the Great Wall's largest sales market outside of China. The company's declared turnover in Russia in 2021 amounted to about US$780 million.	2023
Hikvision	China	Video surveillance equipment	According to NACP, the revenue of the official Hikvision representative in Russia increased by 42% with the start of the 2022 Russian invasion of Ukraine, while net profit increased by 1526%. In the US, under John McCain National Defense Authorization Act, federal agencies are barred from buying Hikvision equipment and from entering into official relationships with companies and organizations that use its cameras. In the European Union and Australia, usage of Hikvision cameras in official premises is banned.	2023
Japan Tobacco International	Switzerland; Japan	Tobacco industry	With a market share of 34.9%, JTI is regarded as the leader of the tobacco market in Russia. According to NACP, JTI contributed at least US$3.6 billion directly to the Russian budget.	2023
Kerui Group	China	Oil and gas equipment	After Russian invasion of Ukraine, Kerui's shipments to Russia increased 8.5 times. In the fall of 2022, the official representative of Kerui in Russia, Rus-KR LLC, and Gazprom signed a cooperation and strategic partnership agreement.	2023
Knauf	Germany	Building materials	The German company actively promotes mobilisation in Russia by sending its employees to the war against Ukraine.	2023
Leroy Merlin	France	Home improvement	According to NACP, Leroy Merlin Vostok, the company's enterprise in Russia, provides a high revenue part of the Russian budget and is a significant source of income for the Russian government.	2022
Liberian International Ship & Corporate Registry (LISCR)	United States	Ship registration	Providing flags for Russian ships.	2023
Mars Inc.	United States	Multinational confectionery, pet food, and other food products	Continues to operate in Russia.	2023
Metro AG	Germany	Retail	The company partnered with Russian Sberbank. The company's sales in Russia grew to 2.9 billion euro in the fiscal year 2021/2022.	2023
Mondelēz International, Inc.	United States	Food	According to NACP, in 2022 Mondelēz paid more than US$61 million in taxes to the Russian budget.	2023
Nestlé	Switzerland	Food processing	Nestle is represented in the Russian Federation through Nestle Russia LLC. The company paid more than US$25 million in profit taxes as of 2021. In April 2023, the management of Nestlé Russia LLC asked the Ministry of Finance of the Russian Federation to take the necessary measures to restrict public access to the results of operations and financial statements of the company's subsidiaries.	2023
OpenWay Group	Belgium	Payment services	After the Russian annexation of Crimea in 2014, when Visa Inc. and Mastercard ceased operating in Russian banks of the region, OpenWay Group was engaged to develop an alternative payment system called Mir.	2022
PepsiCo	United States	Multinational food, snack, and beverage corporation	Continues to operate in Russia.	2023
Philip Morris International	United States	Tobacco industry	The market share of Philip Morris International brands in Russia amounted to 30.1% in 2019. The total amount of income tax paid by Philip Morris International to the Russian budget in 2022 amounted to US$206 million. Following the Russian invasion of Ukraine, Philip Morris announced its intention to sell its Russian business and exit the market, but has not done so.	2023
Procter & Gamble	United States	Cosmetics	The company has two factories operating in Russia – the Gillette razor manufacturing plant in Saint Petersburg and a toiletries manufacturing plant in Tula Oblast.	2023
Rockwool International	Denmark	Insulation	Selling products to the Russian Ministry of Defence for use on warships.	2023
SLB	United States	Energy services	In the first half of 2022, the Russian market amounted to US$1.21 billion or 6% of the company's turnover. According to NACP, the company is also facilitating the issuance of conscription notices and is banning remote work for Russians who avoid military draft. In March 2024, it was reported that SLB has no intentions of withdrawing from Russia, despite western pressure to reduce financial support to the Kremlin's war efforts.	2023
Shandong Odes Industry Co., Ltd.	China	All-terrain vehicles	Supplying the Russian army and paying $0.8m taxes in Russia.	2023
Sinopec	China	Oil and gas	Paying taxes in Russia.	2023
Şişecam Group	Turkey	Chemicals and glass	The company remains the largest exporter in its field to Russia.	2023
Spinner	Germany	Machine tools	From 24 February 2022 to 31 June 2023, almost US$15 million worth of SPINNER machines and components were imported to Russia.	2023
Subway	United States	Fast food	Continuing to operate over 500 restaurants in Russia through Subway Russia Service Company, headquartered in St. Petersburg.	2024
Unilever	United Kingdom	Consumer packaged goods	In 2022, Unilever Rus LLC paid approximately US$50 million in taxes to the Russian budget, while its factories in Omsk, Yekaterinburg, Saint Petersburg, and Tula continued to operate. However, Unilever's new CEO, Hein Schumacher announced on the company's website, that Unilever had finalized the sale of its Russian business to the Arnest Group; a Russian manufacturer of perfume, cosmetics, and household products on 10 October 2024. The sale included all of Unilever's business in Russia, including four factories, and its business in Belarus. Hein Schumacher has now been replaced with Fernando Fernandez as of March 2025	2023
Vičiūnai Group	Lithuania	Food products	Continues to operate its Kaliningrad factory and recruit staff despite initially stating that the company would withdraw from Russia.	2024
Xiaomi Corporation	China	Consumer electronics	The company paid to the Russian budget US$2.5 million in taxes. In the third quarter of 2022 the company increased supplies to Russia by 39% compared to the previous quarter.	2023
Yves Rocher	France	Cosmetics	In 2022 Yves Rocher paid about US$6 million in taxes to the Russian budget. NACP regards Yves Rocher as "one of the most famous Western companies that refused to boycott Russia".	2023
Zhejiang Geely Holding Group	China	Automotive industry	In 2022, Geely Motors LLC paid over US$51.4 million in taxes to the Russian government. As of May 2023, official Geely dealers were represented in 89 Russian cities.	2023

=== Former company inclusions and suspensions ===
Name	Country	Branch	Notes	Date
Delta Tankers Ltd.	Greece	Oil tanker services	Withdrawn from list after the 11th package of EU sanctions, but was reinstated after failing to publicly condemn Russian aggression, before being suspended pending discussions with the EU.	Suspended 2023
Dynacom Tankers Management Ltd.	Greece	Oil tanker services	Withdrawn from list after the 11th package of EU sanctions, but was reinstated after failing to publicly condemn Russian aggression, before being suspended pending discussions with the EU.	Suspended 2023
Minerva Marine Inc.	Greece	Oil tanker services	Withdrawn from list after the 11th package of EU sanctions, but was reinstated after failing to publicly condemn Russian aggression. Delisted in November 2023 after agreeing to cease all Russian trade.	Removed 2023
Mondi	United Kingdom	Packaging and paper	The company owns one paper production plant and three processing enterprises in Russia. Removed from list after business in Russia sold in September 2023.	Removed 2023
OTP Bank	Hungary	Banking	In 2020 the Russian branch of OTP Bank received 113 million rubles in profit and paid about 190 million rubles to the Russian budget. OTP Bank also recognizes the Donetsk and Luhansk People's Republic, as well as provides preferential credit terms to the Russian military. Suspended from list in September, then removed from list in October.	Removed 2023
Peninsula Petroleum	Ireland	Oil fuel	The company stopped supplying fuel to three types of vessels owned by Russian companies, sailing under the Russian flag or carrying Russian oil. The company sent a corresponding letter to NAPC and was removed from the list accordingly.	Removed 2023
Raiffeisen Bank International	Austria	Banking	The Russian division of Raiffeisen Bank International offers credit holidays to Russians who are fighting in Ukraine and recognizes the Donetsk and Luhansk People's Republic. In 2022 the profit of the Russian division amounted to 2.058 billion euros, while the total profit of the group was 3.797 billion euros. Suspended from list in December 2023 to ensure Austria would vote in favour of the 12th package of sanctions and bilateral consultations could take place.	Suspended 2023
Shree Ramkrishna Exports	India	Diamond production	Confirmation that no rough diamonds had been bought from Russia since January 2023 and none will be bought.	Removed 2023
Thenamaris Ships Management	Greece	Sea transport	Withdrawn from list after the 11th package of EU sanctions, but was reinstated after failing to publicly condemn Russian aggression. Delisted in November 2023 after agreeing to cease all Russian trade.	Removed 2023
TMS Tankers Ltd.	Greece	Tanker services	Withdrawn from list after the 11th package of EU sanctions, but was reinstated after failing to publicly condemn Russian aggression. Delisted in November 2023 after agreeing to cease all Russian trade.	Removed 2023

== Noted effects of being included on list ==
- June 2023: British Airways and Scandinavian Airlines remove Mondelez products.
- August 2023: Mondi withdrew from Russia after being listed in February 2023.
- September 2023: Hungary agreed to 11th EU sanctions package after OTP Bank removed from list.
- November 2023: Three Greek shipping companies agreed to cease Russian trade after being listed.
- December 2023: Scandinavian Airlines stopped using PepsiCo and Nesquik products.
- December 2023: Austria blocked 12th EU sanctions package until Raiffeisen Bank International was removed from the list.
- January 2024: Oleksandr Novikov, the former head of Ukraine's NACP reported that dozens of large transnational companies had left Russia for fear of being included on the list of sponsors.
- January 2024: Sweden's Royal House has cancelled the royal warrant to Marabou chocolate as it is owned by Mondelez.

== Removal from public access ==
It was reported that Austria, China, France and Hungary had criticised the list and the inclusion of certain companies in it. China, in particular, a major consumer of Ukrainian grain, demanded in February 2024 the removal of 14 Chinese companies from the list to "eliminate negative impacts". Another cited reason was the frustration for singling out companies from countries that supported Ukraine.

On 22 March 2024, the NACP announced the decision to close the list to public access and move its data to the Interdepartmental Working Group on Implementation of the State Sanctions Policy (IWG). The decision was based on the meeting of the Cabinet of Ministers of Ukraine on 15 March 2024.

== See also ==
- Corporate responses to the Russian invasion of Ukraine
- Economic impact of the Russian invasion of Ukraine
- International sanctions during the Russian invasion of Ukraine
- List of companies that applied sanctions during the Russo-Ukrainian War
- Support for Russia in the Russo-Ukrainian war
