= Mondi =

Packaging and paper company

Mondi plc

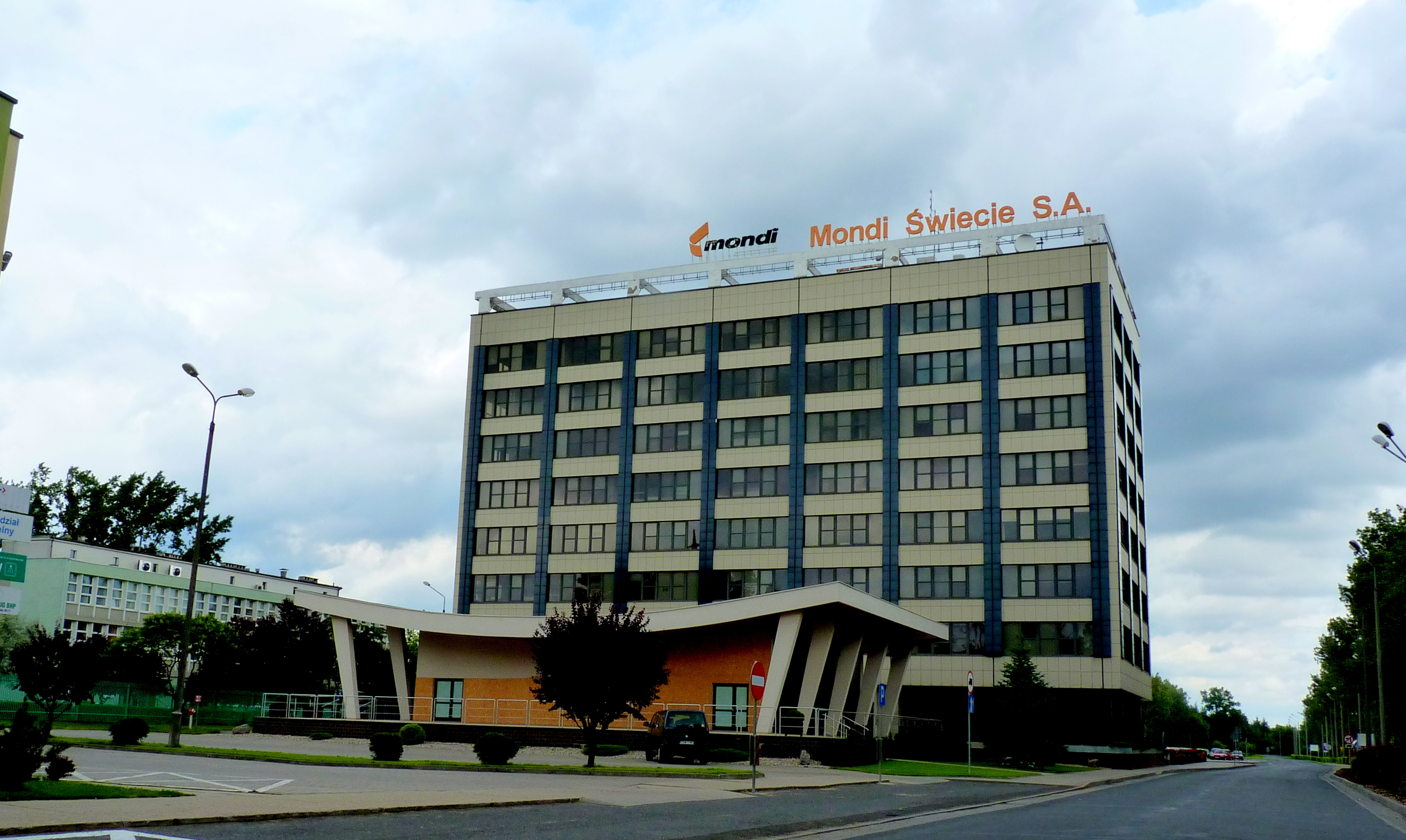
- Mondi headquarters in Świecie, Kociewie
- Type: Public limited company
- Traded as: LSE: MNDI; JSE: MNP; FTSE 250 Component
- Industry: Packaging; Paper
- Founded: 1967; 59 years ago
- Headquarters: Weybridge, England, UK
- Key people: Philip Yea (Chairperson); Andrew R. King (CEO)
- Products: Pulp; Paper; Containerboard; Packaging
- Revenue: ▲€7,663 million (2025)
- Operating income: ▼€497 million (2025)
- Net income: ▼€197 million (2025)
- Number of employees: 24,000 (2026)
- Website: www.mondigroup.com

Mondi plc is a multinational packaging and paper group. The company is based in Weybridge, England. It has listings on the Johannesburg Stock Exchange and the London Stock Exchange as a constituent of the FTSE 250 Index.

== History ==
Mondi has its roots in South Africa where, in 1967, the company's former owner, Anglo American plc, built the Merebank Mill in Durban.

In 2000, the company increased its holdings in Neusiedler AG and Frantschach AG, both Austrian businesses, to 100 per cent and 70 per cent respectively. Also in 2000, it acquired Cofinec, a Polish business. It increased its holding in the Syktyvkar Mill in the Komi Republic to 90% in 2002.

In 2004 Mondi further increased its holdings in Frantschach AG, one of its Austrian businesses, to 100 per cent and in Celuloza Świecie AG, another Polish business, to 71% (and then changed its name to Mondi Packaging Paper Świecie).

On 2 July 2007 the company demerged from its former parent company Anglo American plc, and became a dual-listed company, with Mondi Limited listed on the Johannesburg Stock Exchange and Mondi plc listed on the London Stock Exchange.

In 2011, Mondi demerged Mondi Packaging South Africa (listed as Mpact on Johannesburg Stock Exchange).

In 2012, Mondi acquired Nordenia to extend its consumer packaging business.

In May 2017, Peter Oswald was appointed as the new group chief executive. In the same year, the approval of the €335 million Štětí mill modernisation (Czech Republic) happened.

In 2019, Mondi completed the simplification of its corporate structure from dual listed into a single holding company under Mondi plc.

On 1 April 2020, Andrew King succeeded Peter Oswald as Mondi Group's chief executive.

On 4 May 2022, Mondi announced plans to divest from its Russian assets. However, in December 2022, The Times reported than the sale of its Russian assets was "still awaiting approval". In February 2023 Mondi was added to Ukraine International Sponsors of War list. Mondi temporarily abandoned its stated intention of selling its most significant asset in Russia, the Syktyvkar Pulp and Paper Mill, to a company owned by Viktor Kharitonin, due to lack of progress with the necessary approvals, in June 2023. However, in September 2023, the sale was completed and Mondi confirmed that it no longer trades in Russia.

In January 2023, it was announced Mondi had completed the acquisition of the Duino paper mill from the Italian graphic and speciality paper company, Burgo Group for €40 million.

In March 2024, the company made an agreed offer worth £5.1 billion to acquire DS Smith. Mondi pulled out of the deal following a counteroffer from International Paper.

In April 2025, Mondi completed the acquisition of the Western European packaging assets of Schumacher Packaging, expanding its operations in Germany, the Benelux region and the United Kingdom.

In April 2026, Mondi established a joint venture with Indonesian cement producer Indocement to produce paper bags at Indocement’s facility in West Java. Mondi holds a 60% stake in the venture, with Indocement holding the remaining 40%. The venture was expected to become operational toward the end of 2026.

In April 2026, Mondi announced plans to close three factories in Hungary, Poland and Germany, in addition to three other recently announced closures in Turkey, Hungary and Germany. The closures were expected to result in approximately 450 job losses during the year.
