= List of heads of state and government who have visited Russia during the Russo-Ukrainian war (2022–present) =

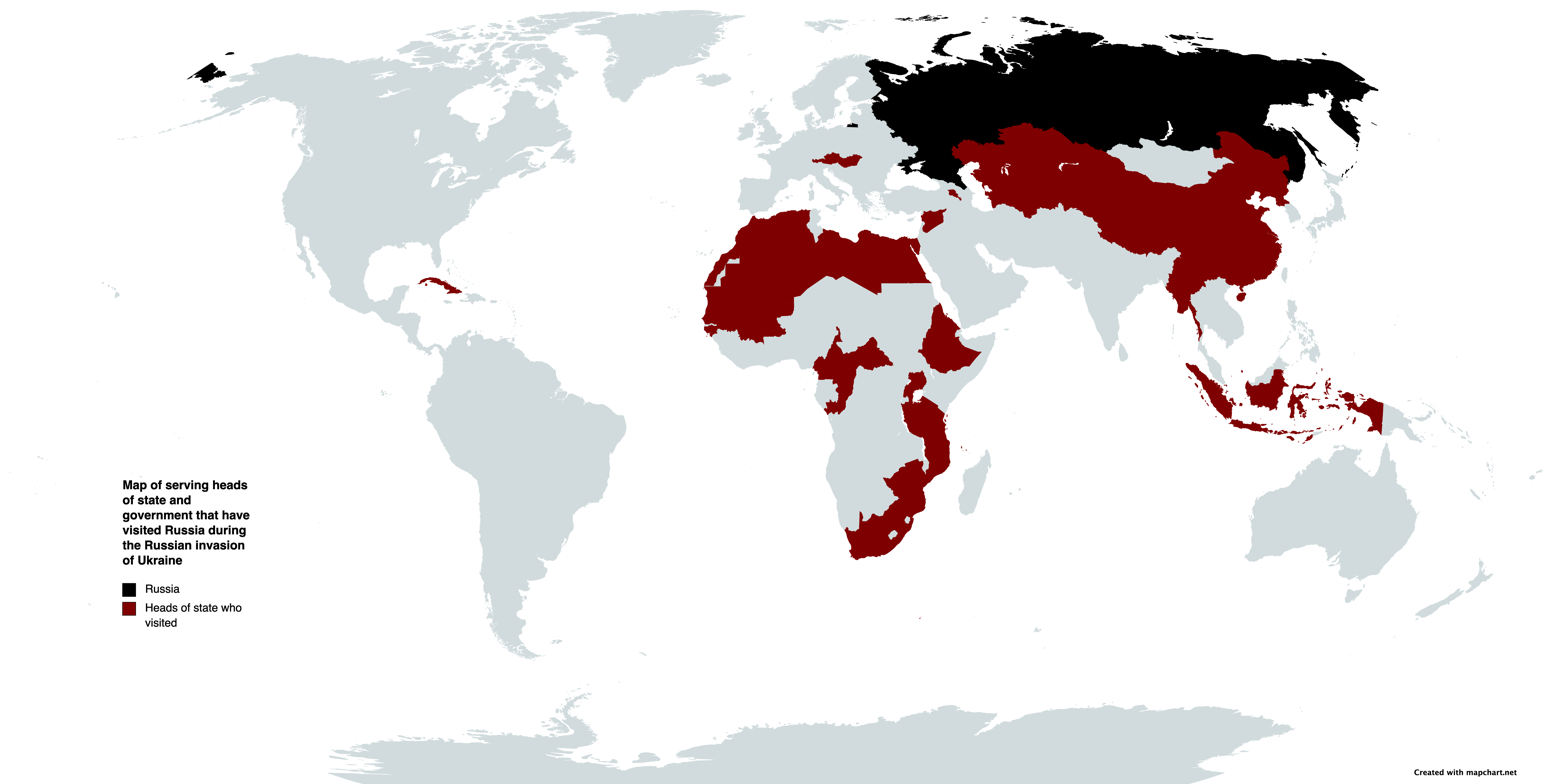
Map of serving heads who visited Russia since the invasion of Ukraine

A number of foreign leaders have visited Russia since the 2022 Russian invasion of Ukraine, meeting with Russian President Vladimir Putin and other officials, and visiting areas around the country.

== List ==
| State | Head of state and/or government | Date(s) of visit(s) | Details of visit(s) | References |
|---|---|---|---|---|
| Algeria | Abdelmadjid Tebboune | 2023-06-13–2023-06-15 | State visit to Russia | |
| Algeria | Aymen Benabderrahmane | 2023-07-27–2023-07-28 | 2023 Russia–Africa Summit | |
| Algeria | Sifi Ghrieb | 2026-10-28-2026-10-29 | 2026 Russia–Africa Summit | |
| Armenia | Nikol Pashinyan | 2022-04-19–2022-04-20 | State visit | |
| Armenia | Nikol Pashinyan | 2022-05-16 | CSTO summit | |
| Armenia | Nikol Pashinyan | 2022-09-06–2022-09-09 | Working visit | |
| Armenia | Nikol Pashinyan | 2022-10-07 | Informal CIS summit | |
| Armenia | Nikol Pashinyan | 2022-10-31 | Working visit | |
| Armenia | Nikol Pashinyan | 2022-11-23 | CSTO summit | |
| Armenia | Nikol Pashinyan | 2022-12-26–2022-12-27 | Working visit | |
| Armenia | Nikol Pashinyan | 2023-05-09 | 2023 Moscow Victory Day Parade | |
| Armenia | Nikol Pashinyan | 2023-05-24–2023-05-25 | State visit | |
| Armenia | Nikol Pashinyan | 2023-06-07–2023-06-09 | State visit | |
| Armenia | Nikol Pashinyan | 2023-12-25–2023-12-26 | CIS and Eurasian Economic Union summit | |
| Armenia | Nikol Pashinyan | 2024-05-08 | Working visit | |
| Armenia | Nikol Pashinyan | 2024-10-08 | CIS summit | |
| Armenia | Nikol Pashinyan | 2024-10-22–2024-10-24 | 2024 BRICS summit | |
| Armenia | Nikol Pashinyan | 2025-05-08–2025-05-09 | 2025 Moscow Victory Day Parade | |
| Armenia | Nikol Pashinyan | 2025-07-24–2025-07-25 | Working visit | |
| Armenia | Nikol Pashinyan | 2025-09-25–2025-09-26 | Global Atomic Forum. | |
| Armenia | Nikol Pashinyan | 2025-12-22–2025-12-23 | CIS and Eurasian Economic Union summit | |
| Armenia | Nikol Pashinyan | 2026-04-01 | Working Visit. | |
| Austria | Karl Nehammer | 2022-04-11 | Nehammer became the first European leader to visit Russia during the invasion, he visited Ukraine two days earlier. | |
| Azerbaijan | Ilham Aliyev | 2022-10-07 | Informal CIS summit | |
| Azerbaijan | Ilham Aliyev | 2022-10-31–2022-11-01 | Working visit | |
| Azerbaijan | Ilham Aliyev | 2022-12-26 | Working visit | |
| Azerbaijan | Ilham Aliyev | 2023-05-25 | Working visit | |
| Azerbaijan | Ilham Aliyev | 2023-12-26 | CIS summit | |
| Azerbaijan | Ilham Aliyev | 2024-04-22 | Working visit | |
| Azerbaijan | Ilham Aliyev | 2024-10-08 | CIS summit | |
| Azerbaijan | Ilham Aliyev | 2024-10-22–2024-10-24 | 2024 BRICS summit | |
| Bahrain | Hamad bin Isa Al Khalifa | 2024-05-22–2024-05-23 | State visit | |
| Belarus | Alexander Lukashenko | 2022-03-11 | Working visit | |
| Belarus | Alexander Lukashenko | 2022-04-12 | Working visit | |
| Belarus | Alexander Lukashenko | 2022-05-16 | CSTO summit | |
| Belarus | Alexander Lukashenko | 2022-05-23 | Working visit | |
| Belarus | Alexander Lukashenko | 2022-06-15–2022-06-18 | Attended the 2022 St. Petersburg International Economic Forum | |
| Belarus | Alexander Lukashenko | 2022-06-24–2022-06-25 | Working visit | |
| Belarus | Alexander Lukashenko | 2022-09-26 | Working visit | |
| Belarus | Alexander Lukashenko | 2022-10-07 | Informal CIS summit | |
| Belarus | Alexander Lukashenko | 2022-11-23 | CSTO summit | |
| Belarus | Alexander Lukashenko | 2022-12-26–2022-12-27 | Working visit and CIS summit | |
| Belarus | Alexander Lukashenko | 2023-02-17 | Working visit | |
| Belarus | Alexander Lukashenko | 2023-04-05–2023-04-06 | Working visit | |
| Belarus | Alexander Lukashenko | 2023-05-09 | 2023 Moscow Victory Day Parade | |
| Belarus | Alexander Lukashenko | 2023-05-24–2023-05-25 | Working visit | |
| Belarus | Alexander Lukashenko | 2023-06-09 | Working visit | |
| Belarus | Alexander Lukashenko | 2023-07-23 | Working visit | |
| Belarus | Alexander Lukashenko | 2023-09-15 | Working visit | |
| Belarus | Alexander Lukashenko | 2023-12-25–2023-12-26 | CIS summit | |
| Belarus | Alexander Lukashenko | 2024-01-28–2024-01-29 | Working visit | |
| Belarus | Alexander Lukashenko | 2024-02-21 | Working visit | |
| Belarus | Alexander Lukashenko | 2024-04-11–2024-04-12 | Working visit | |
| Belarus | Alexander Lukashenko | 2024-05-08–2024-05-09 | 2024 Moscow Victory Day Parade | |
| Belarus | Alexander Lukashenko | 2024-10-08–2024-10-09 | Working visit and CIS summit | |
| Belarus | Alexander Lukashenko | 2024-10-22–2024-10-24 | 2024 BRICS summit | |
| Belarus | Alexander Lukashenko | 2024-12-25–2024-12-26 | CIS and Eurasian Economic Union summit | |
| Belarus | Alexander Lukashenko | 2025-03-13 | State visit | |
| Belarus | Alexander Lukashenko | 2025-04-29 | State visit | |
| Belarus | Alexander Lukashenko | 2025-05-08–2025-05-09 | 2025 Moscow Victory Day Parade | |
| Belarus | Alexander Lukashenko | 2025-08-01 | Working visit to Valaam Monastery. | |
| Belarus | Alexander Lukashenko | 2025-09-25–2025-09-26 | Global Atomic Forum. | |
| Belarus | Alexander Lukashenko | 2025-12-21–2025-12-23 | CIS and Eurasian Economic Union summit | |
| Belarus | Alexander Lukashenko | 2026-02-26 | Working visit | |
| Belarus | Alexander Lukashenko | 2026-05-08-2026-05-09 | 2026 Moscow Victory Day Parade | |
| Belarus | Alexander Lukashenko | 2026-06-26 | Working visit | |
| Belarus | Alexander Lukashenko | 2026-08-29 | Working visit | |
| Belarus | Alexander Lukashenko | 2026-11-10 | CSTO Summit | |
| Bolivia | Luis Arce | 2024-06-05–2024-06-08 | Attended the 2024 St. Petersburg International Economic Forum. | |
| Bolivia | Luis Arce | 2024-10-22–2024-10-24 | 2024 BRICS summit | |
| Bosnia and Herzegovina | Željka Cvijanović | 2025-05-08–2025-05-09 | 2025 Moscow Victory Day Parade | |
| Brazil | Luiz Inácio Lula da Silva | 2025-05-08–2025-05-09 | 2025 Moscow Victory Day Parade | |
| Brunei | Hassanal Bolkiah | 2026-06-17-2026–06-18 | 2026 ASEAN-Russia Summit | |
| Burkina Faso | Ibrahim Traoré | 2023-07-27–2023-07-28 | 2023 Russia–Africa Summit | |
| Burkina Faso | Ibrahim Traoré | 2025-05-08–2025-05-09 | 2025 Moscow Victory Day Parade | |
| Burundi | Évariste Ndayishimiye | 2023-7-27-2023-07-28 | 2023 Russia–Africa Summit | |
| Burundi | Évariste Ndayishimiye | 2026-10-28-2026-10-29 | 2026 Russia–Africa Summit | |
| Cambodia | Hun Manet | 2026-06-17-2026-06-18 | 2026 ASEAN-Russia Summit. | |
| Cameroon | Paul Biya | 2023-07-27–2023-07-28 | 2023 Russia–Africa Summit | |
| Central African Republic | Faustin-Archange Touadéra | 2023-07-27–2023-07-28 | 2023 Russia–Africa Summit | |
| Central African Republic | Faustin-Archange Touadéra | 2025-01-16 | State visit | |
| Central African Republic | Faustin-Archange Touadéra | 2026-03-05 | Working visit | |
| Central African Republic | Faustin-Archange Touadéra | 2026-10-28-2026-10-29 | 2026 Russia–Africa Summit | |
| Chad | Mahamat Déby | 2024-01-24 | State visit | |
| China | Xi Jinping | 2023-03-20–2023-03-22 | State visit | |
| China | Xi Jinping | 2024-10-22–2024-10-24 | 2024 BRICS summit | |
| China | Xi Jinping | 2025-05-07–2025-05-10 | 2025 Moscow Victory Day Parade and state visit. | |
| Comoros | Azali Assoumani | 2023-06-17 | Attended as part of an African Union Peace Delegation. | |
| Comoros | Azali Assoumani | 2023-07-27–2023-07-28 | 2023 Russia–Africa Summit | |
| Comoros | Azali Assoumani | 2026-10-28-2026-10-29 | 2026 Russia–Africa Summit | |
| Congo, Democratic Republic of the | Félix Tshisekedi | 2026-10-27-2026-10-29 | 2026 Russia–Africa Summit | |
| Congo, Republic of the | Denis Sassou Nguesso | 2023-07-27–2023-07-28 | 2023 Russia–Africa Summit | |
| Congo, Republic of the | Denis Sassou Nguesso | 2024-06-27 | State visit | |
| Congo, Republic of the | Denis Sassou Nguesso | 2024-10-22–2024-10-24 | 2024 BRICS summit | |
| Congo, Republic of the | Denis Sassou Nguesso | 2025-05-07–2025-05-09 | 2025 Moscow Victory Day Parade | |
| Congo, Republic of the | Denis Sassou Nguesso | 2026-04-28-2026-04-29 | State Visit | |
| Congo, Republic of the | Denis Sassou Nguesso | 2026-10-28-2026-10-29 | 2026 Russia–Africa Summit | |
| Cuba | Miguel Díaz-Canel | 2022-11-22 | State visit | |
| Cuba | Miguel Díaz-Canel | 2024-05-08–2024-05-09 | 2024 Moscow Victory Day Parade | |
| Cuba | Miguel Díaz-Canel | 2025-05-07–2025-05-09 | 2025 Moscow Victory Day Parade | |
| Egypt | Abdel Fattah el-Sisi | 2022-06-15–2022-06-18 | Attended the 2022 St. Petersburg International Economic Forum. | |
| Egypt | Abdel Fattah el-Sisi | 2023-07-27–2023-07-28 | 2023 Russia–Africa Summit | |
| Egypt | Abdel Fattah el-Sisi | 2024-10-22–2024-10-24 | 2024 BRICS summit | |
| Egypt | Abdel Fattah el-Sisi | 2025-05-08–2025-05-09 | 2025 Moscow Victory Day Parade | |
| Egypt | Abdel Fattah el-Sisi | 2026-10-28-2026-10-29 | 2026 Russia–Africa Summit | |
| Equatorial Guinea | Teodoro Obiang Nguema Mbasogo | 2023-11-02 | Working visit | |
| Equatorial Guinea | Teodoro Obiang Nguema Mbasogo | 2024-09-26 | State visit to Russia | |
| Equatorial Guinea | Teodoro Obiang Nguema Mbasogo | 2025-05-08–2025-05-09 | 2025 Moscow Victory Day Parade | |
| Equatorial Guinea | Teodoro Obiang Nguema Mbasogo | 2026-10-28-2026-10-29 | 2026 Russia–Africa Summit | |
| Eritrea | Isaias Afwerki | 2023-05-31–2023-06-01 | State visit | |
| Eritrea | Isaias Afwerki | 2023-07-27–2023-07-28 | 2023 Russia–Africa Summit | |
| Eritrea | Isaias Afwerki | 2026-10-28-2026-10-29 | 2026 Russia–Africa Summit | |
| Ethiopia | Abiy Ahmed Ali | 2023-07-27–2023-07-28 | 2023 Russia–Africa Summit | |
| Ethiopia | Abiy Ahmed Ali | 2024-10-22–2024-10-24 | 2024 BRICS summit | |
| Ethiopia | Abiy Ahmed Ali | 2025-09-25–2025-09-26 | Global Atomic Forum. | |
| Ethiopia | Abiy Ahmed Ali | 2026-10-28-2026-10-29 | 2026 Russia–Africa Summit | |
| Ghana | John Mahama | 2026-10-28 | 2026 Russia–Africa Summit | |
| Guinea-Bissau | Umaro Sissoco Embaló | 2022-10-25 | State visit | |
| Guinea-Bissau | Umaro Sissoco Embaló | 2023-07-27–2023-07-28 | 2023 Russia–Africa Summit | |
| Guinea-Bissau | Umaro Sissoco Embaló | 2024-05-09 | 2024 Moscow Victory Day Parade | |
| Guinea-Bissau | Umaro Sissoco Embaló | 2025-02-26 | State visit | |
| Guinea-Bissau | Umaro Sissoco Embaló | 2025-05-08–2025-05-09 | 2025 Moscow Victory Day Parade | |
| Hungary | Viktor Orbán | 2022-09-03 | Death and funeral of Mikhail Gorbachev | |
| Hungary | Viktor Orbán | 2024-07-05 | Working visit | |
| Hungary | Viktor Orbán | 2025-11-28 | Working visit | |
| India | Narendra Modi | 2024-07-08–2024-07-09 | 22nd India–Russia annual summit | |
| India | Narendra Modi | 2024-10-22–2024-10-24 | 2024 BRICS summit | |
| Indonesia | Joko Widodo | 2022-06-29–2022-06-30 | Working visit | |
| Indonesia | Prabowo Subianto | 2024-07-31 | Visit as the President-Elect. | |
| Indonesia | Prabowo Subianto | 2025-06-19–2025-06-20 | Official Visit and attended the St. Petersburg International Economic Forum. | |
| Indonesia | Prabowo Subianto | 2025-12-10 | Official and working visit | |
| Indonesia | Prabowo Subianto | 2026-04-13 | Working visit | |
| Indonesia | Prabowo Subianto | 2026-09-03 | Attended the Eastern Economic Forum | |
| Iran | Ebrahim Raisi | 2023-12-07 | State visit to Russia to discuss the Middle East conflict. | |
| Iran | Masoud Pezeshkian | 2024-10-22–2024-10-24 | 2024 BRICS summit | |
| Iran | Masoud Pezeshkian | 2025-01-17 | State visit to sign strategic partnership agreement. | |
| Iran | Masoud Pezeshkian | 2026-10-27 | 8th GECF Summit | |
| Iraq | Mohammed Shia' al-Sudani | 2023-10-10–2023-10-12 | State visit to discuss the Middle East conflict | |
| Israel | Naftali Bennett | 2022-03-05 | First Israeli leader to visit Russia during the invasion. Bennet tried to mediate an end to the war. | |
| Kazakhstan | Kassym-Jomart Tokayev | 2022-05-16 | CSTO summit | |
| Kazakhstan | Kassym-Jomart Tokayev | 2022-06-17 | Attended the 2022 St. Petersburg International Economic Forum. | |
| Kazakhstan | Kassym-Jomart Tokayev | 2022-08-19 | Working visit | |
| Kazakhstan | Kassym-Jomart Tokayev | 2022-10-07 | Informal CIS summit | |
| Kazakhstan | Kassym-Jomart Tokayev | 2022-11-28 | Working visit | |
| Kazakhstan | Kassym-Jomart Tokayev | 2022-12-26 | CIS summit | |
| Kazakhstan | Kassym-Jomart Tokayev | 2023-05-09 | 2023 Moscow Victory Day Parade | |
| Kazakhstan | Kassym-Jomart Tokayev | 2023-05-25 | Working visit to the Eurasian Economic Council. | |
| Kazakhstan | Kassym-Jomart Tokayev | 2023-10-07 | Working visit | |
| Kazakhstan | Kassym-Jomart Tokayev | 2023-12-25–2023-12-26 | Working visit | |
| Kazakhstan | Kassym-Jomart Tokayev | 2024-02-21 | Working visit | |
| Kazakhstan | Kassym-Jomart Tokayev | 2024-05-08–2024-05-09 | 2024 Moscow Victory Day Parade | |
| Kazakhstan | Kassym-Jomart Tokayev | 2024-10-08 | CIS summit | |
| Kazakhstan | Kassym-Jomart Tokayev | 2024-10-22–2024-10-24 | 2024 BRICS summit | |
| Kazakhstan | Kassym-Jomart Tokayev | 2024-12-25–2024-12-26 | CIS and Eurasian Economic Union summit | |
| Kazakhstan | Kassym-Jomart Tokayev | 2025-05-08–2025-05-09 | 2025 Moscow Victory Day Parade | |
| Kazakhstan | Kassym-Jomart Tokayev | 2025-11-11–2025-11-12 | Working visit | |
| Kazakhstan | Kassym-Jomart Tokayev | 2025-12-21–2025-12-23 | CIS and Eurasian Economic Union summit | |
| Kazakhstan | Kassym-Jomart Tokayev | 2026-05-08-2026-05-09 | 2026 Moscow Victory Day Parade | |
| Kazakhstan | Kassym-Jomart Tokayev | 2026-07-25 | Working visit | |
| Kazakhstan | Kassym-Jomart Tokayev | 2026-11-10 | CSTO Summit | |
| Kenya | William Ruto | 2026-10-28 | 2026 Russia–Africa Summit | |
| Kyrgyzstan | Sadyr Japarov | 2022-05-16 | Working visit and CSTO summit | |
| Kyrgyzstan | Sadyr Japarov | 2022-12-26 | CIS summit | |
| Kyrgyzstan | Sadyr Japarov | 2023-05-09 | 2023 Moscow Victory Day Parade | |
| Kyrgyzstan | Sadyr Japarov | 2023-05-25 | Working visit | |
| Kyrgyzstan | Sadyr Japarov | 2023-11-23 | CSTO summit | |
| Kyrgyzstan | Sadyr Japarov | 2023-12-25–2023-12-28 | CIS summit | |
| Kyrgyzstan | Sadyr Japarov | 2024-02-21 | Working visit | |
| Kyrgyzstan | Sadyr Japarov | 2024-05-09 | 2024 Moscow Victory Day Parade | |
| Kyrgyzstan | Sadyr Japarov | 2024-10-08 | CIS summit | |
| Kyrgyzstan | Sadyr Japarov | 2024-10-22–2024-10-24 | 2024 BRICS summit | |
| Kyrgyzstan | Sadyr Japarov | 2024-12-25–2024-12-26 | CIS and Eurasian Economic Union summit. | |
| Kyrgyzstan | Sadyr Japarov | 2025-05-08–2025-05-09 | 2025 Moscow Victory Day Parade | |
| Kyrgyzstan | Sadyr Japarov | 2025-07-02 | Working visit | |
| Kyrgyzstan | Sadyr Japarov | 2025-12-21–2025-12-23 | CIS and Eurasian Economic Union summit | |
| Kyrgyzstan | Sadyr Japarov | 2026-04-23 | Working Visit. | |
| Kyrgyzstan | Sadyr Japarov | 2026-11-10 | CSTO Summit | |
| Laos | Thongloun Sisoulith | 2024-05-09 | 2024 Moscow Victory Day Parade | |
| Laos | Thongloun Sisoulith | 2024-10-22–2024-10-24 | 2024 BRICS summit | |
| Laos | Thongloun Sisoulith | 2025-07-31 | Working visit | |
| Laos | Thongloun Sisoulith | 2026-05-09 | 2026 Moscow Victory Day Parade | |
| Libya | Mohamed al-Menfi | 2023-07-27–2023-07-28 | 2023 Russia–Africa Summit | |
| Libya | Mohamed al-Menfi | 2026-10-28-2026-10-29 | 2026 Russia–Africa Summit | |
| Madagascar | Michael Randrianirina | 2026-02-19 | Official Visit. | |
| Madagascar | Michael Randrianirina | 2026-10-28-2026-10-29 | 2026 Russia–Africa Summit | |
| Malaysia | Ibrahim Iskandar of Johor | 2025-08-05–2025-08-08 | State visit | |
| Malaysia | Ibrahim Iskandar of Johor | 2026-01-26-2026-01-26 | Private visit | |
| Malaysia | Ibrahim Iskandar of Johor | 2026-05-09 | 2026 Moscow Victory Day Parade | |
| Malaysia | Anwar Ibrahim | 2024-09-04–2024-09-05 | Attended the Eastern Economic Forum | |
| Malaysia | Anwar Ibrahim | 2025-05-14–2025-05-16 | State visit | |
| Malaysia | Anwar Ibrahim | 2026-06-17-2026-06-18 | 2026 ASEAN-Russia Summit. | |
| Mali | Assimi Goïta | 2023-07-27–2023-07-28 | 2023 Russia–Africa Summit | |
| Mali | Assimi Goïta | 2025-06-23 | State visit | |
| Mali | Assimi Goïta | 2026-10-28-2026-10-29 | 2026 Russia–Africa Summit | |
| Mauritania | Mohamed Ould Bilal | 2023-07-27–2023-07-28 | 2023 Russia–Africa Summit | |
| Mauritania | Mohamed Ould Ghazouani | 2024-10-22–2024-10-24 | 2024 BRICS summit | |
| Mauritania | Mohamed Ould Ghazouani | 2026-10-28-2026-10-29 | 2026 Russia–Africa Summit | |
| Mongolia | Luvsannamsrain Oyun-Erdene | 2022-09-07 | Eastern Economic Forum. | |
| Mongolia | Ukhnaagiin Khürelsükh | 2025-05-07–2025-05-09 | 2025 Moscow Victory Day Parade | |
| Mongolia | Gombojavyn Zandanshatar | 2025-09-04 | Eastern Economic Forum. | |
| Mongolia | Gombojavyn Zandanshatar | 2025-11-18 | Working visit | |
| Mongolia | Nyam-Osoryn Uchral | 2026-09-03 | Attended the Eastern Economic Forum | |
| Morocco | Aziz Akhannouch | 2023-07-27–2023-07-28 | 2023 Russia–Africa Summit | |
| Morocco | Fatima Ezzahra El Mansouri | 2026-10-28-2026-10-29 | 2026 Russia–Africa Summit | |
| Mozambique | Filipe Nyusi | 2023-07-27–2023-07-28 | 2023 Russia–Africa Summit | |
| Mozambique | Daniel Chapo | 2026-10-27-2026-10-29 | 8th GECF Summit and 2026 Russia-Africa Summit | |
| Myanmar | Min Aung Hlaing | 2022-09-07 | Attended the Eastern Economic Forum. | |
| Myanmar | Min Aung Hlaing | 2025-03-04 | State visit | |
| Myanmar | Min Aung Hlaing | 2025-05-08–2025-05-09 | 2025 Moscow Victory Day Parade | |
| Myanmar | Min Aung Hlaing | 2025-09-25–2025-09-26 | Global Atomic Forum. | |
| Myanmar | Min Aung Hlaing | 2026-08-18 | Official Visit. | |
| Namibia | Netumbo Nandi-Ndaitwah | 2026-10-28 | 2026 Russia–Africa Summit | |
| Niger | Abdourahamane Tchiani | 2026-10-28 | 2026 Russia–Africa Summit | |
| North Korea | Kim Jong Un | 2023-09-12–2023-09-17 | State visit | |
| Oman | Haitham bin Tariq Al Said | 2025-04-22 | State visit | |
| Pakistan | Imran Khan | 2022-02-23–2022-02-25 | First world leader to visit Russia at the beginning of full-scale invasion of Ukraine. | |
| Palestine | Mahmoud Abbas | 2024-08-12–2024-08-14 | State visit to Russia | |
| Palestine | Mahmoud Abbas | 2024-10-22–2024-10-24 | 2024 BRICS summit | |
| Palestine | Mahmoud Abbas | 2025-05-08–2025-05-09 | 2025 Moscow Victory Day Parade | |
| Palestine | Mahmoud Abbas | 2026-01-22–2026-01-23 | Working visit | |
| Philippines | Bongbong Marcos | 2026-06-17-2026-06-18 | 2026 ASEAN-Russia Summit. | |
| Qatar | Tamim bin Hamad Al Thani | 2025-04-17 | State visit to Russia | |
| Qatar | Tamim bin Hamad Al Thani | 2026-10-27 | 8th GECF Summit | |
| Rwanda | Justin Nsengiyumva | 2026-10-27-2026-10-29 | 2026 Russia–Africa Summit | |
| Senegal | Macky Sall | 2022-06-03 | Working visit | |
| Senegal | Macky Sall | 2023-06-17 | Attended as part of an African Union peace delegation. | |
| Senegal | Macky Sall | 2023-07-27–2023-07-28 | 2023 Russia–Africa Summit | |
| Serbia | Aleksandar Vučić | 2025-05-08–2025-05-09 | 2025 Moscow Victory Day Parade | |
| Seychelles | Patrick Herminie | 2026-04-22 | Working Visit. | |
| Singapore | Lawrence Wong | 2026-06-17-2026-06-18 | 2026 ASEAN-Russia Summit | |
| Slovakia | Robert Fico | 2024-12-22 | Working visit | |
| Slovakia | Robert Fico | 2025-05-08–2025-05-09 | 2025 Moscow Victory Day Parade | |
| Slovakia | Robert Fico | 2026-05-09 | 2026 Moscow Victory Day Parade | |
| South Africa | Cyril Ramaphosa | 2023-06-17 | Attended as part of an African Peace Mission. | |
| South Africa | Cyril Ramaphosa | 2023-07-27–2023-07-28 | 2023 Russia–Africa Summit | |
| South Africa | Cyril Ramaphosa | 2024-10-22–2024-10-24 | 2024 BRICS summit | |
| South Sudan | Salva Kiir | 2023-09-28 | Working visit | |
| South Sudan | Salva Kiir | 2026-10-28-2026-10-29 | 2026 Russia–Africa Summit | |
| Sudan | Abdel Fattah al-Burhan | 2026-10-28 | 2026 Russia–Africa Summit | |
| Syria | Bashar al-Assad | 2023-03-14–2023-03-15 | Working visit | |
| Syria | Bashar al-Assad | 2024-07-24–2024-07-25 | Working visit | |
| Syria | Bashar al-Assad | 2024-11-28 | Working visit | |
| Syria | Ahmed al-Sharaa | 2025-10-15 | First Working visit as the New Syrian President. | |
| Syria | Ahmed al-Sharaa | 2026-01-28 | Working visit | |
| Tajikistan | Emomali Rahmon | 2022-05-16 | CSTO summit | |
| Tajikistan | Emomali Rahmon | 2022-10-07 | Informal CIS summit | |
| Tajikistan | Emomali Rahmon | 2022-11-23 | CSTO summit | |
| Tajikistan | Emomali Rahmon | 2022-12-26 | Working visit and CIS summit | |
| Tajikistan | Emomali Rahmon | 2023-05-09 | 2023 Moscow Victory Day Parade | |
| Tajikistan | Emomali Rahmon | 2023-11-21–2023-11-22 | Working visit | |
| Tajikistan | Emomali Rahmon | 2023-12-25 | CIS summit | |
| Tajikistan | Emomali Rahmon | 2024-02-21 | Working visit | |
| Tajikistan | Emomali Rahmon | 2024-05-09 | 2024 Moscow Victory Day Parade | |
| Tajikistan | Emomali Rahmon | 2024-10-08 | CIS summit | |
| Tajikistan | Emomali Rahmon | 2024-10-22–2024-10-24 | 2024 BRICS summit | |
| Tajikistan | Emomali Rahmon | 2024-12-24–2024-12-25 | Working visit and informal CIS summit | |
| Tajikistan | Emomali Rahmon | 2025-03-17 | Working visit | |
| Tajikistan | Emomali Rahmon | 2025-05-08–2025-05-09 | 2025 Moscow Victory Day Parade | |
| Tajikistan | Emomali Rahmon | 2025-12-22–2025-12-23 | CIS summit | |
| Tajikistan | Emomali Rahmon | 2026-11-10 | CSTO Summit | |
| Tanzania | Kassim Majaliwa | 2023-07-27–2023-07-28 | 2023 Russia–Africa Summit | |
| Tanzania | Samia Suluhu Hassan | 2026-06-03-2026-06-05 | State Visit and attended the St Petersburg International Economic Forum. | |
| Thailand | Anutin Charnvirakul | 2026-06-17-2026-06-18 | 2026 ASEAN-Russia Summit. | |
| Timor-Leste | Kay Rala Xanana Gusmão | 2026-06-17-2026-06-18 | 2026 ASEAN-Russia Summit. | |
| Togo | Faure Gnassingbé | 2025-11-19–2025-11-20 | Working visit | |
| Togo | Faure Gnassingbé | 2026-10-28-2026-10-29 | 2026 Russia–Africa Summit | |
| Tunisia | Sara Zaafarani | 2026-10-28-2026-10-29 | 2026 Russia–Africa Summit | |
| Turkey | Recep Tayyip Erdoğan | 2022-08-05 | Working visit | |
| Turkey | Recep Tayyip Erdoğan | 2023-09-04 | Working visit | |
| Turkey | Recep Tayyip Erdoğan | 2024-10-22–2024-10-24 | 2024 BRICS summit | |
| Turkmenistan | Serdar Berdimuhamedow | 2022-06-10 | State visit | |
| Turkmenistan | Serdar Berdimuhamedow | 2022-10-07 | Informal CIS summit | |
| Turkmenistan | Serdar Berdimuhamedow | 2022-12-26–2022-12-27 | CIS summit | |
| Turkmenistan | Serdar Berdimuhamedow | 2023-05-09 | 2023 Moscow Victory Day Parade | |
| Turkmenistan | Serdar Berdimuhamedow | 2023-12-26 | CIS summit | |
| Turkmenistan | Serdar Berdimuhamedow | 2024-05-09 | 2024 Moscow Victory Day Parade | |
| Turkmenistan | Serdar Berdimuhamedow | 2024-10-08 | CIS summit | |
| Turkmenistan | Serdar Berdimuhamedow | 2024-10-22–2024-10-24 | 2024 BRICS summit | |
| Turkmenistan | Serdar Berdimuhamedow | 2024-12-25 | Informal CIS summit | |
| Turkmenistan | Serdar Berdimuhamedow | 2025-05-08–2025-05-09 | 2025 Moscow Victory Day Parade | |
| Turkmenistan | Serdar Berdimuhamedow | 2025-12-22–2025-12-23 | CIS summit | |
| Uganda | Yoweri Museveni | 2023-07-27–2023-07-28 | 2023 Russia–Africa Summit | |
| United Arab Emirates | Mohamed bin Zayed Al Nahyan | 2022-10-11 | State visit | |
| United Arab Emirates | Mohamed bin Zayed Al Nahyan | 2023-06-16 | Met with Putin at the sidelines of the 2023 St. Petersburg International Economic Forum. | |
| United Arab Emirates | Mohamed bin Zayed Al Nahyan | 2024-10-20–2024-10-24 | 2024 BRICS summit | |
| United Arab Emirates | Mohamed bin Zayed Al Nahyan | 2025-08-07 | Official Working visit | |
| United Arab Emirates | Mohamed bin Zayed Al Nahyan | 2026-01-29 | State visit | |
| United Nations | António Guterres | 2022-04-25–2022-04-26 | Met with President Vladimir Putin and Foreign Minister Sergey Lavrov to discuss the 2022 Russian invasion of Ukraine. | |
| United Nations | António Guterres | 2024-10-22–2024-10-24 | 2024 BRICS summit | |
| Uzbekistan | Shavkat Mirziyoyev | 2022-10-07 | Informal CIS summit | |
| Uzbekistan | Shavkat Mirziyoyev | 2022-12-26–2022-12-27 | CIS summit | |
| Uzbekistan | Shavkat Mirziyoyev | 2023-05-09 | 2023 Moscow Victory Day Parade | |
| Uzbekistan | Shavkat Mirziyoyev | 2023-10-05–2023-10-07 | Working visit | |
| Uzbekistan | Shavkat Mirziyoyev | 2023-12-25–2023-12-26 | CIS summit | |
| Uzbekistan | Shavkat Mirziyoyev | 2024-02-21 | Working visit | |
| Uzbekistan | Shavkat Mirziyoyev | 2024-05-09 | 2024 Moscow Victory Day Parade | |
| Uzbekistan | Shavkat Mirziyoyev | 2024-10-08 | CIS summit | |
| Uzbekistan | Shavkat Mirziyoyev | 2024-10-22–2024-10-24 | 2024 BRICS summit | |
| Uzbekistan | Shavkat Mirziyoyev | 2024-12-25 | Informal CIS summit | |
| Uzbekistan | Shavkat Mirziyoyev | 2025-05-08–2025-05-09 | 2025 Moscow Victory Day Parade | |
| Uzbekistan | Shavkat Mirziyoyev | 2025-12-21–2025-12-23 | CIS and Eurasian Economic Union summit | |
| Uzbekistan | Shavkat Mirziyoyev | 2026-05-08-2026-05-09 | 2026 Moscow Victory Day Parade | |
| Uzbekistan | Shavkat Mirziyoyev | 2026-06-04-2026-06-05 | State Visit and attended the St Petersburg International Economic Forum. | |
| Venezuela | Nicolás Maduro | 2024-10-22–2024-10-24 | 2024 BRICS summit | |
| Venezuela | Nicolás Maduro | 2025-05-07–2025-05-09 | 2025 Moscow Victory Day Parade | |
| Vietnam | Phạm Minh Chính | 2024-10-22–2024-10-24 | 2024 BRICS summit | |
| Vietnam | Phạm Minh Chính | 2026-03-25 | Working visit | |
| Vietnam | Lê Minh Hưng | 2026-06-17-2026-06-18 | 2026 ASEAN-Russia Summit. | |
| Vietnam | Tô Lâm | 2025-05-08–2025-05-09 | 2025 Moscow Victory Day Parade | |
| Vietnam | Tô Lâm | 2026-09-09 | State Visit | |
| Yemen | Rashad al-Alimi | 2025-05-28 | State visit | |
| Zambia | Hakainde Hichilema | 2023-06-17 | Attended as part of an African Union Peace delegation. | |
| Zimbabwe | Emmerson Mnangagwa | 2023-07-27–2023-07-28 | 2023 Russia–Africa Summit | |
| Zimbabwe | Emmerson Mnangagwa | 2024-06-05–2024-06-08 | Attended the 2024 St. Petersburg International Economic Forum. | |
| Zimbabwe | Emmerson Mnangagwa | 2025-05-08–2025-05-09 | 2025 Moscow Victory Day Parade | |
| Zimbabwe | Emmerson Mnangagwa | 2026-10-28-2026-10-29 | 2026 Russia–Africa Summit | |

== Gallery ==
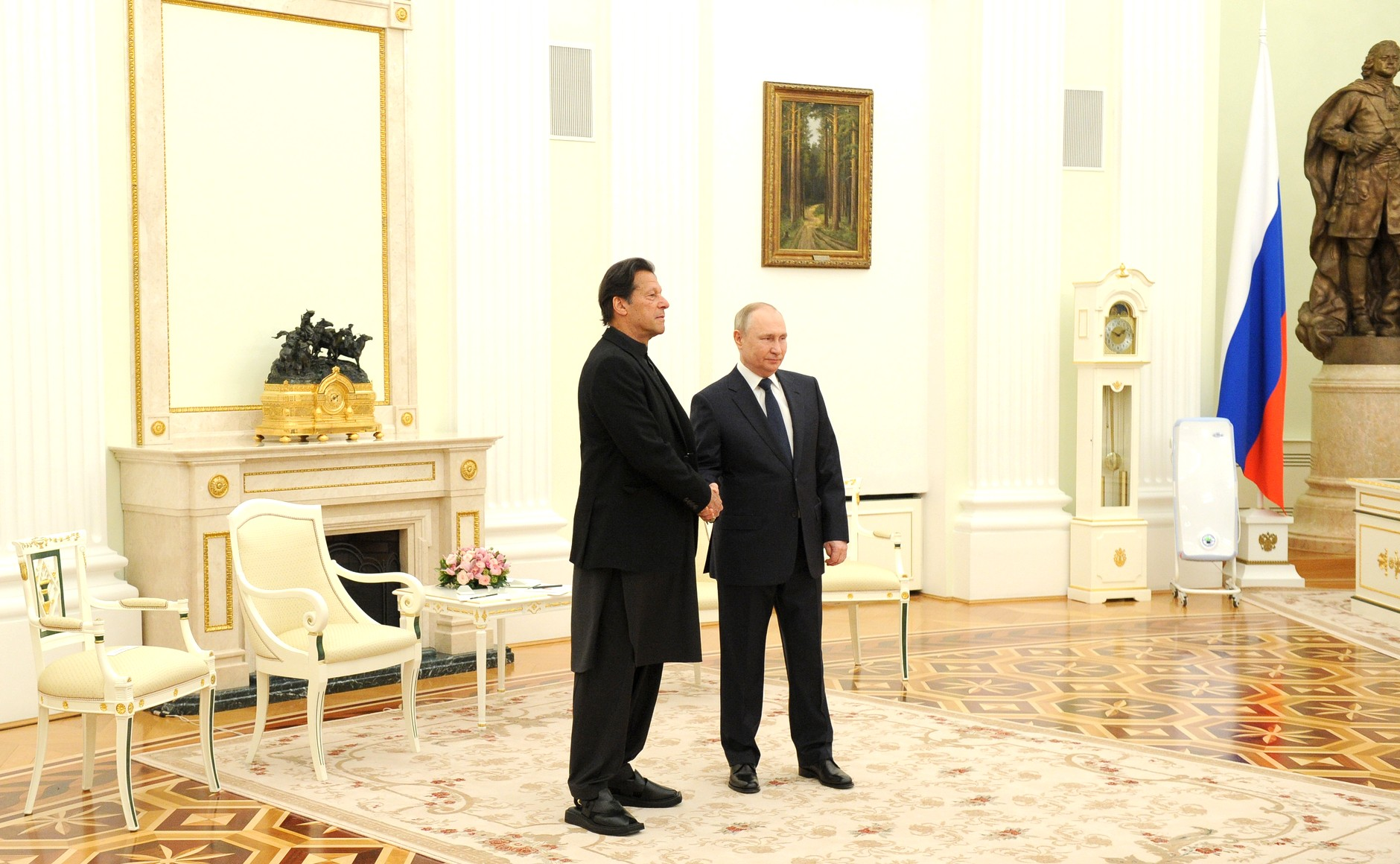
Vladimir Putin meeting with Pakistani Prime Minister Imran Khan in Moscow, 24 February 2022

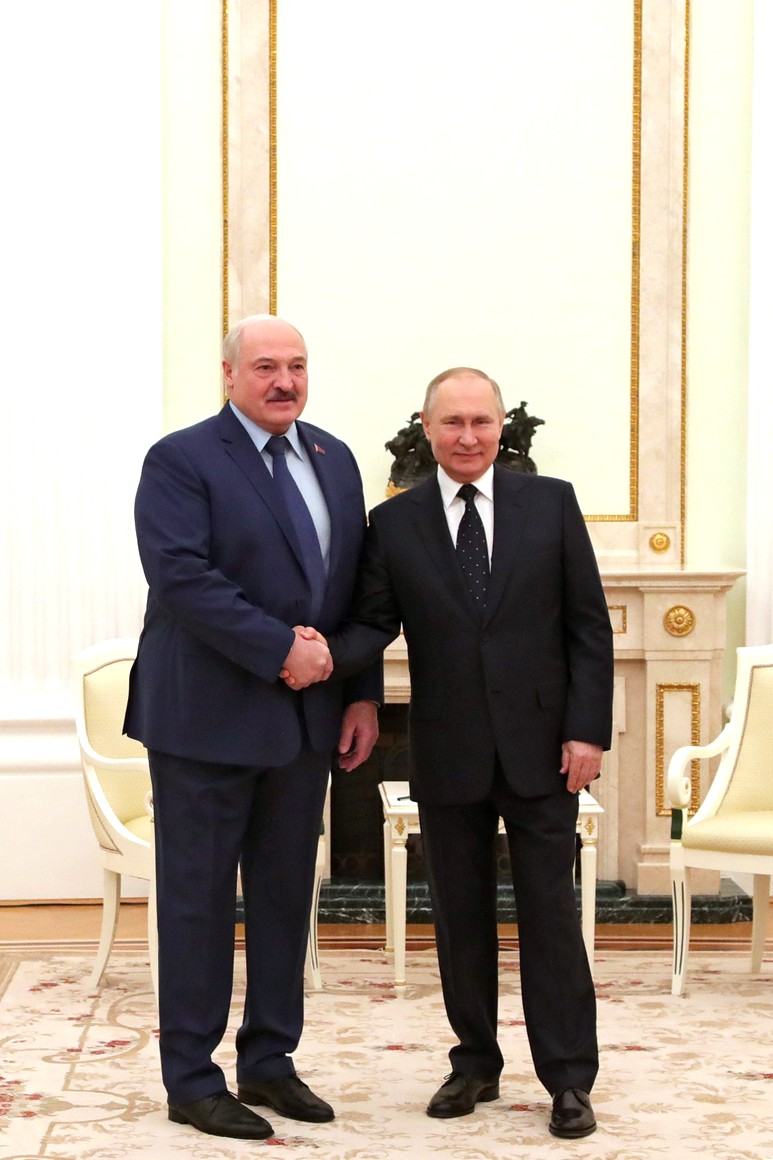
Vladimir Putin meeting with Belarusian President Alexander Lukashenko in Moscow, 11 March 2022

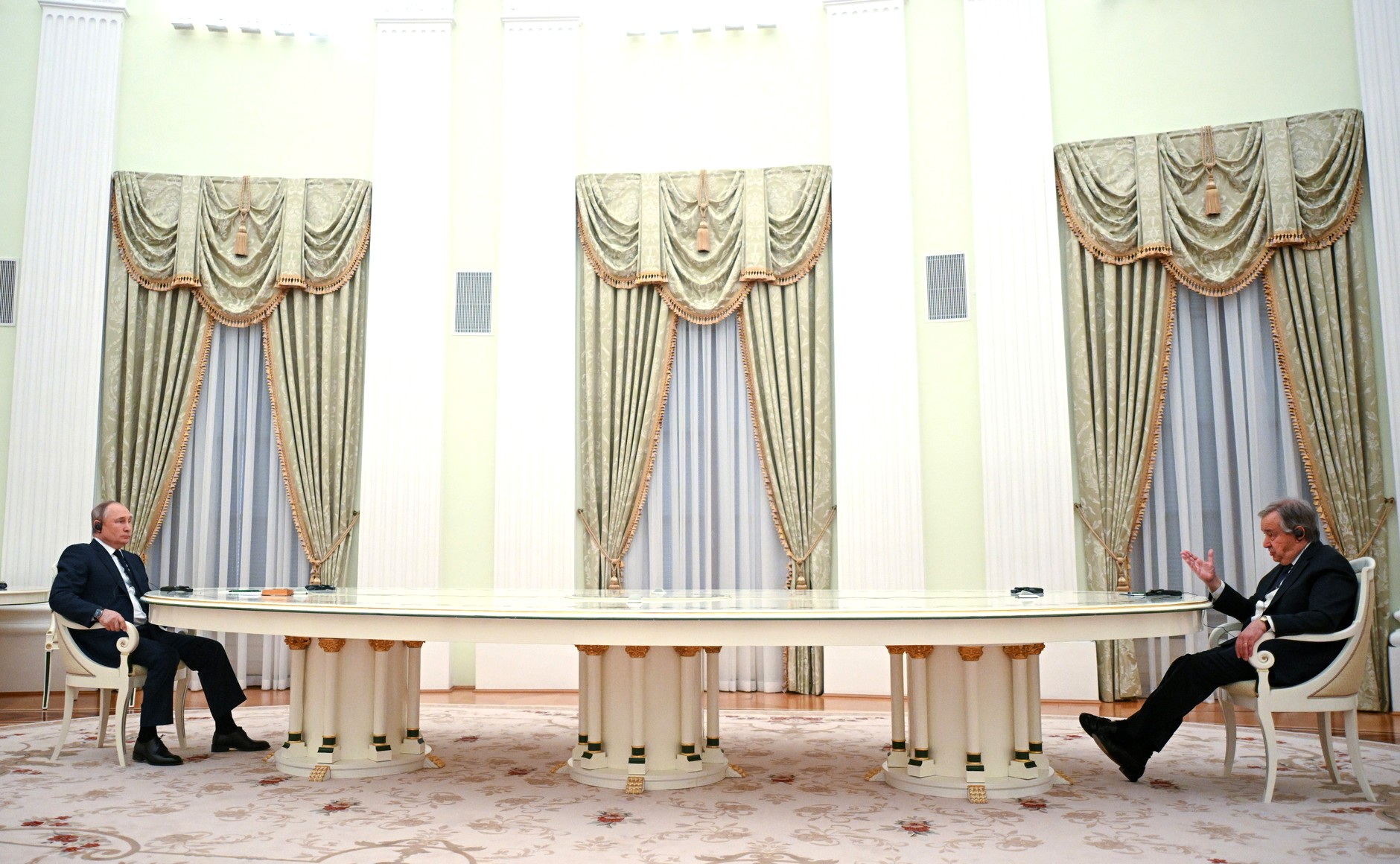
Vladimir Putin meeting with UN Secretary-General António Guterres in Moscow, 26 April 2022

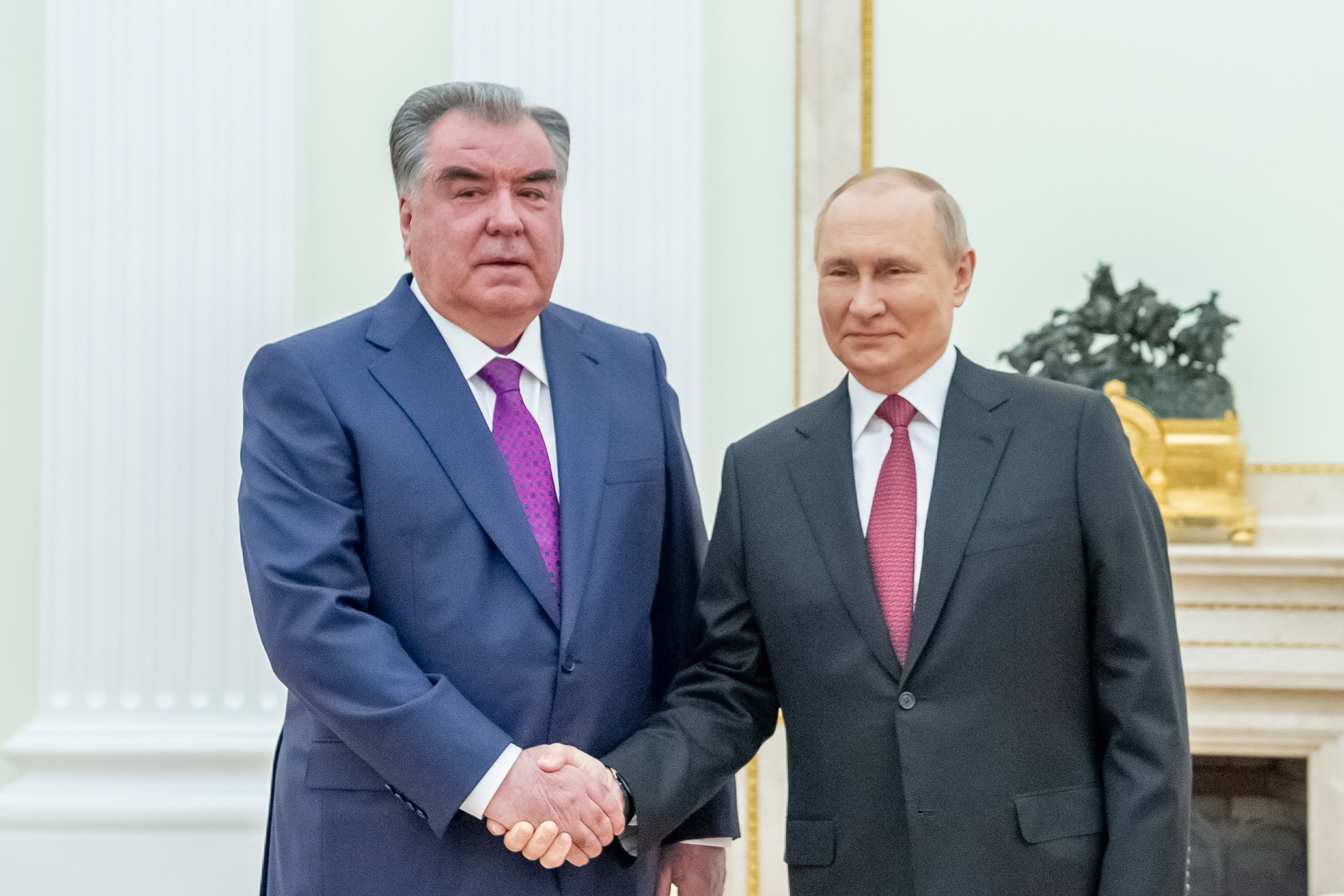
Vladimir Putin meeting with Tajikistani President Emomali Rahmon in Moscow, 16 May 2022

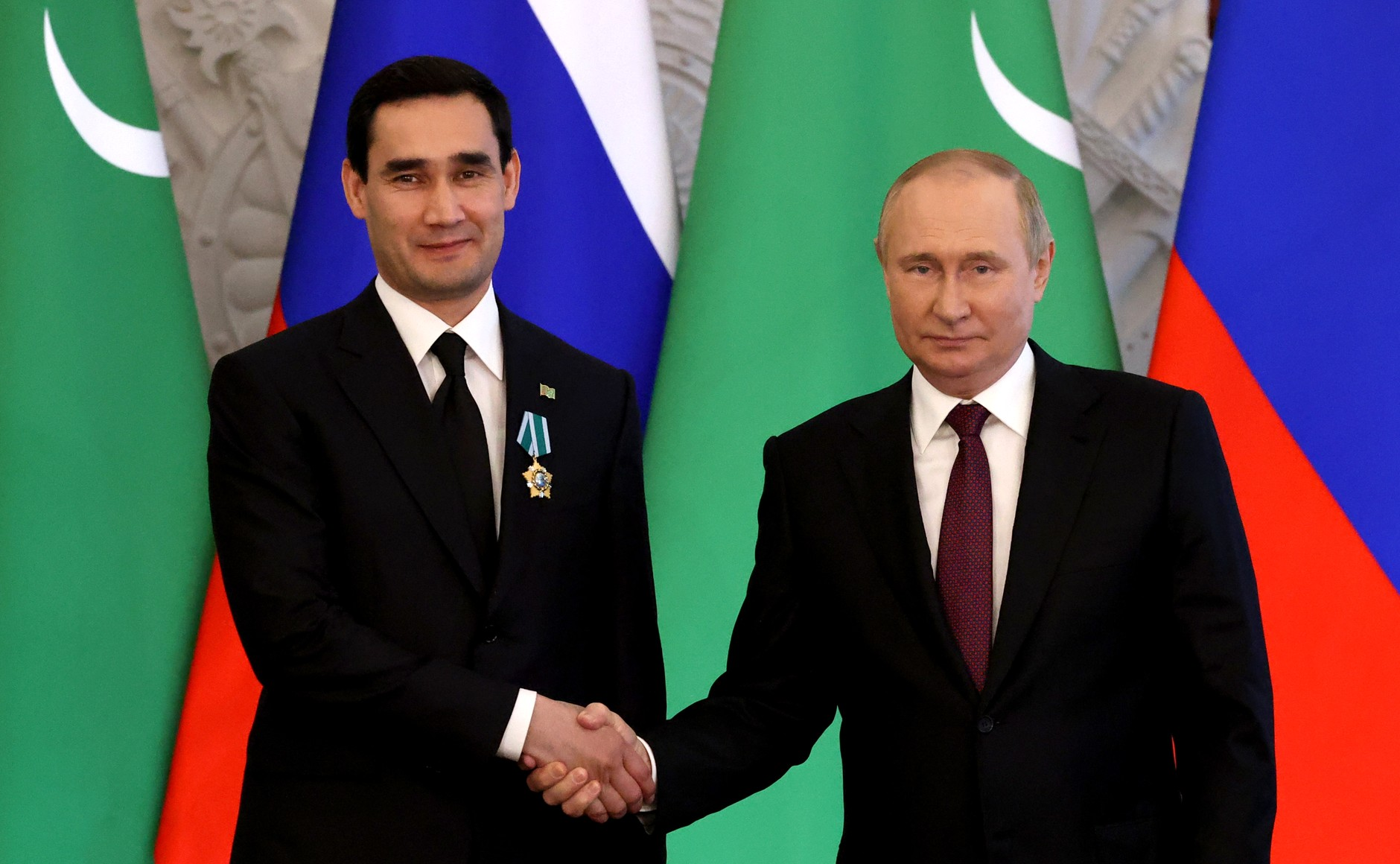
Vladimir Putin meeting with Turkmen President Serdar Berdimuhamedow in Moscow, 10 June 2022

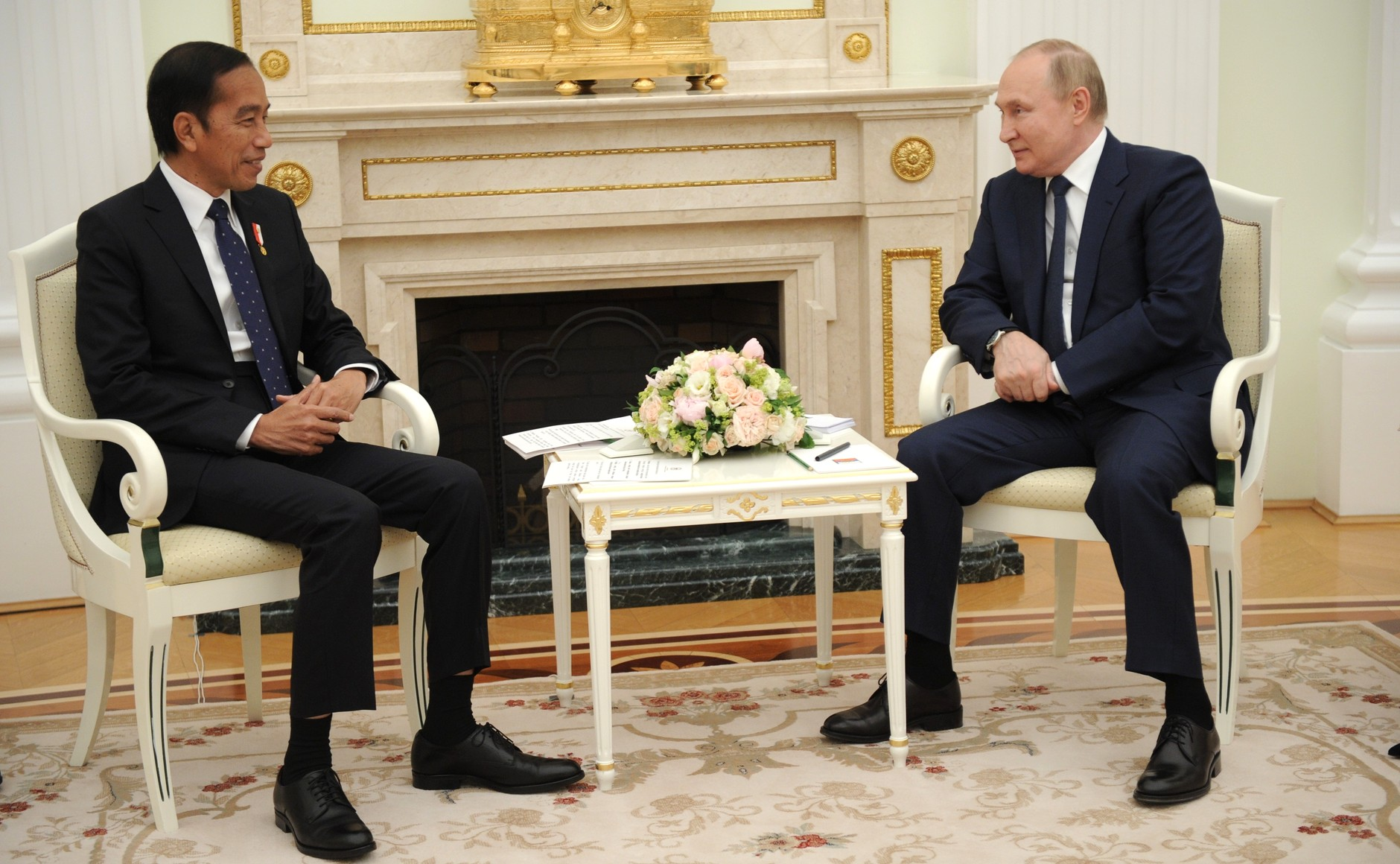
Vladimir Putin meeting with Indonesian President Joko Widodo in Moscow, 30 June 2022

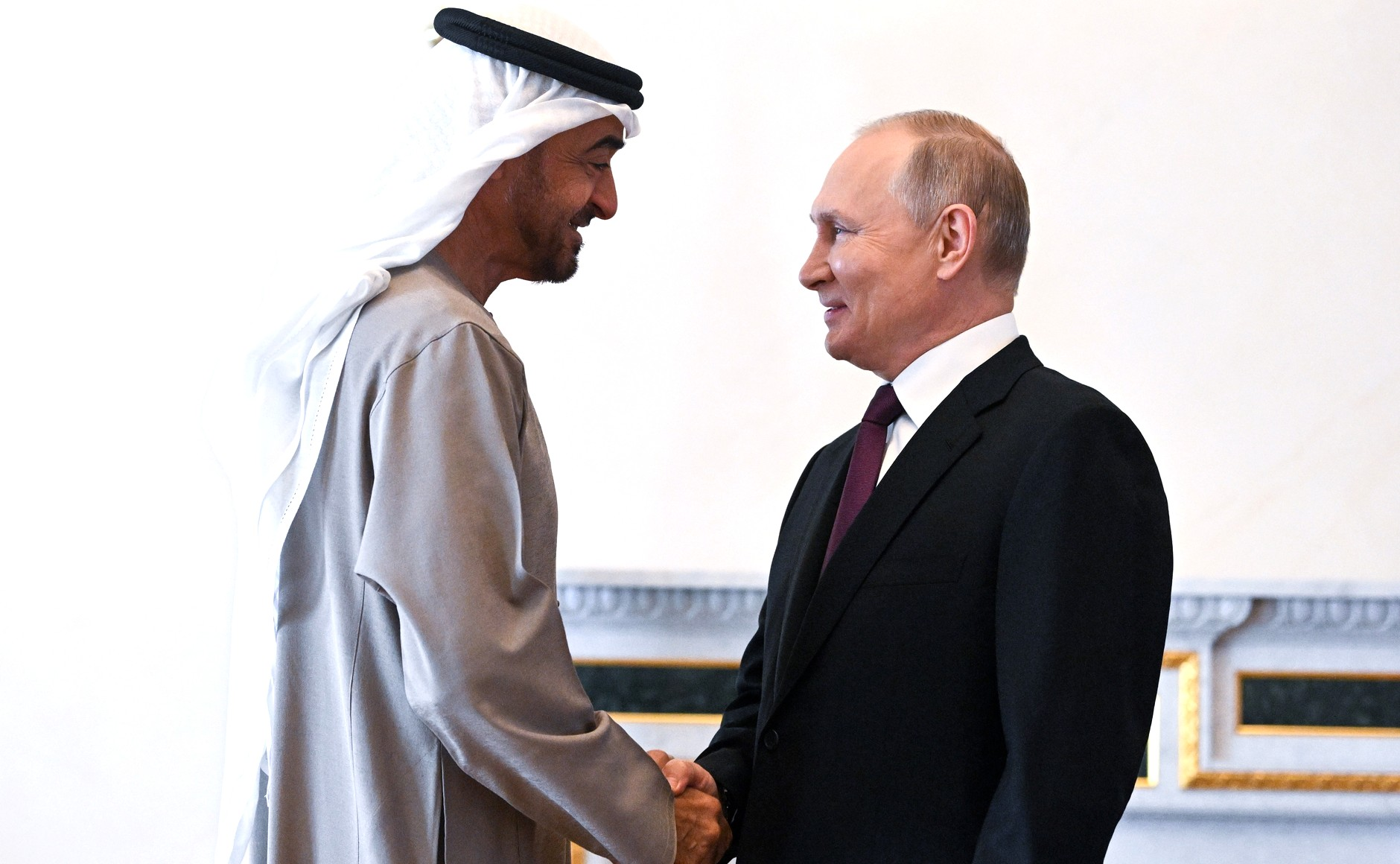
Vladimir Putin meeting with Emirati President Mohamed bin Zayed Al Nahyan in St. Petersburg, 11 October 2022

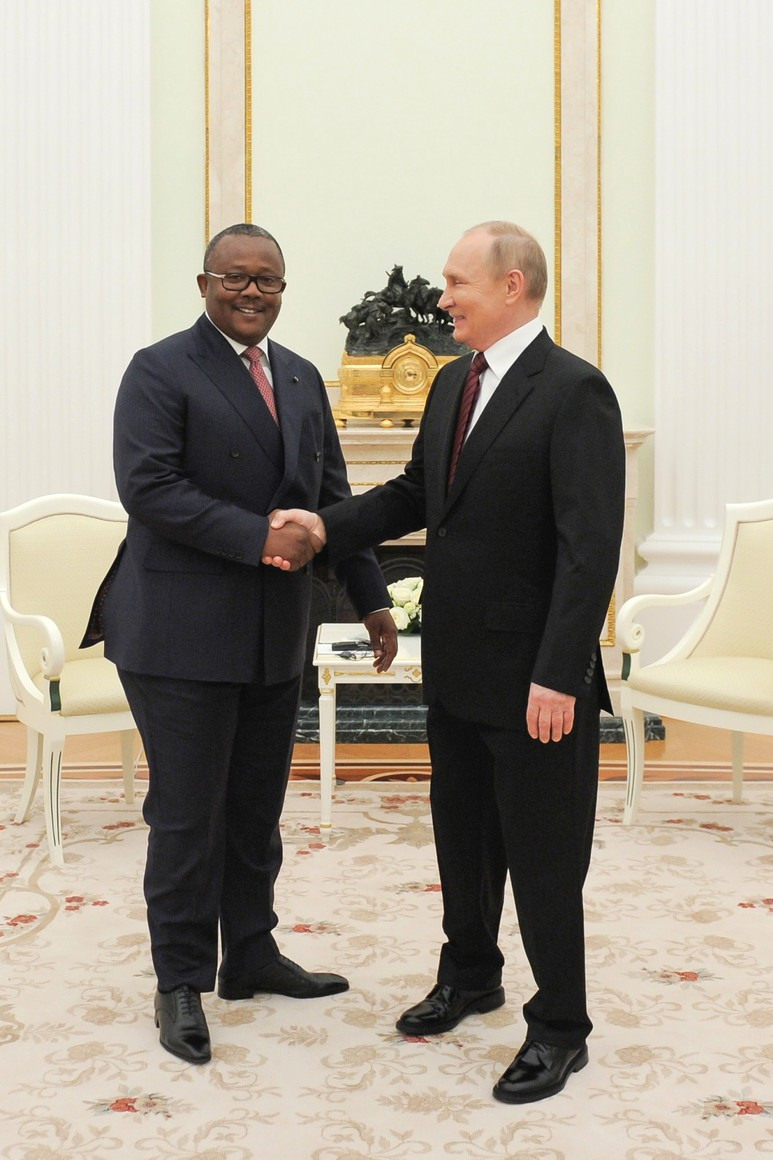
Vladimir Putin meeting with Bissau-Guinean President Umaro Sissoco Embaló in Moscow, 25 October 2022

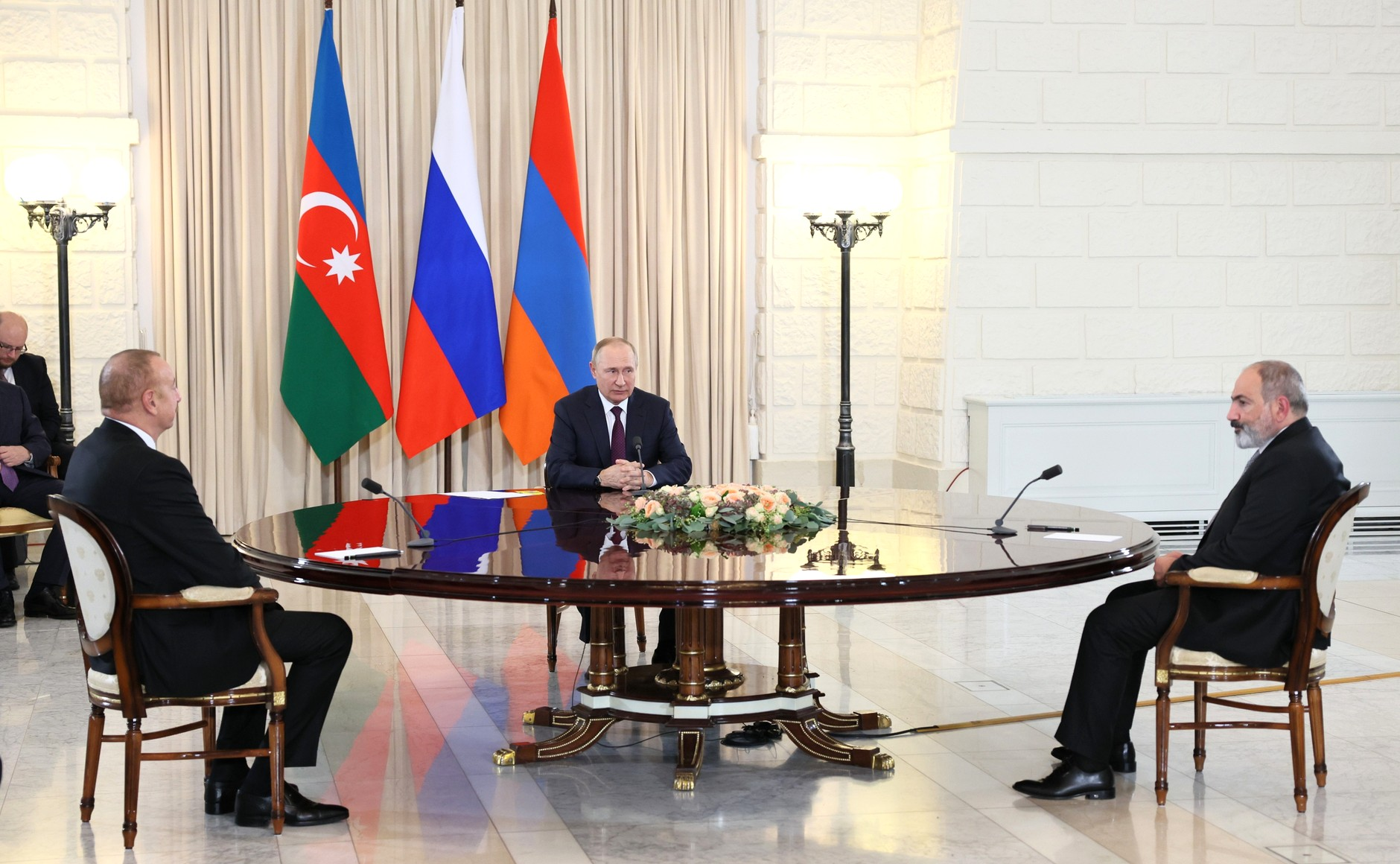
Vladimir Putin meeting with Azerbaijani President Ilham Aliyev and Armenian Prime Minister Nikol Pashinyan in Sochi, 31 October 2022

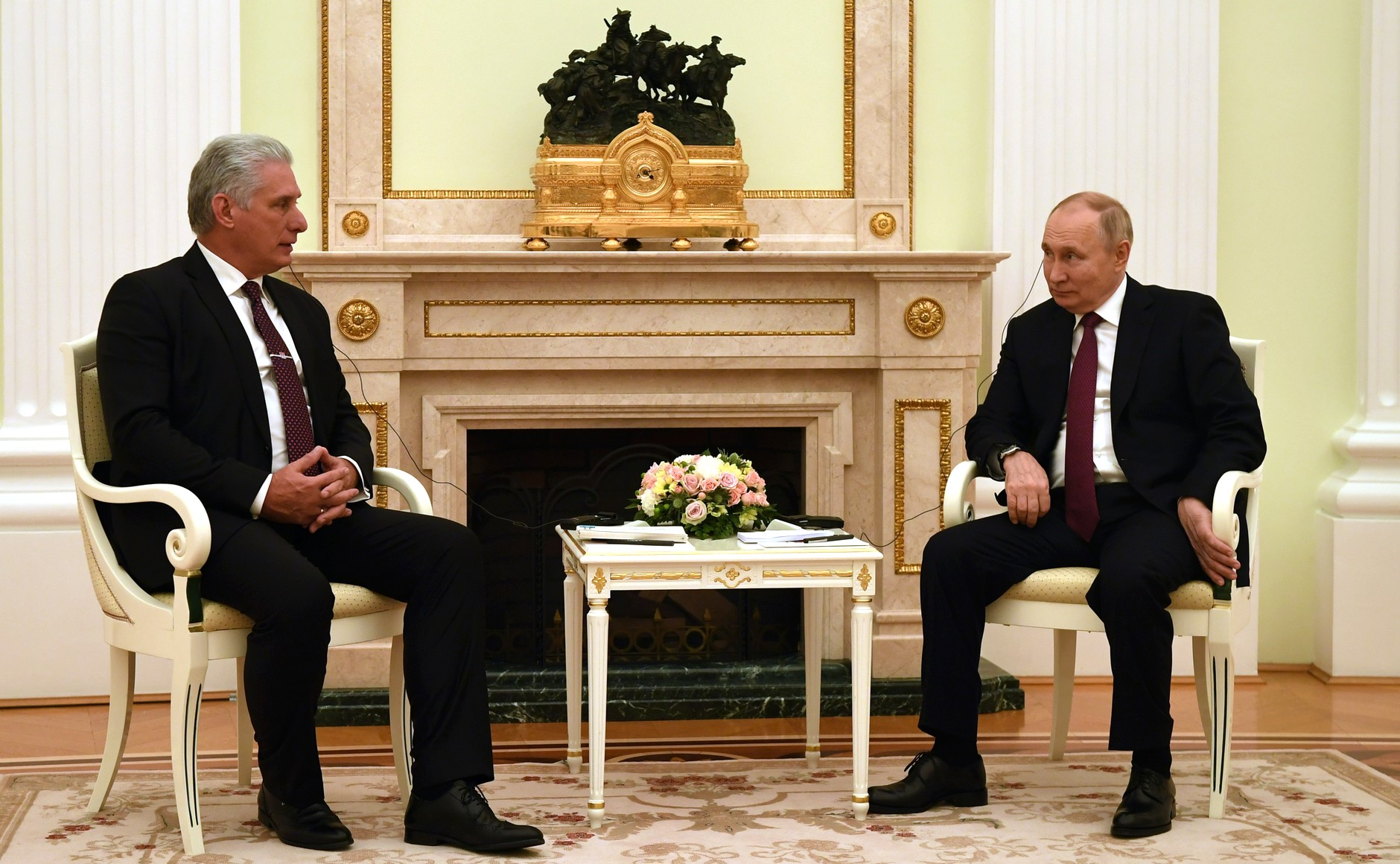
Vladimir Putin meeting with Cuban President & First Secretary of the Communist Party of Cuba Miguel Díaz-Canel in Moscow, 22 November 2022

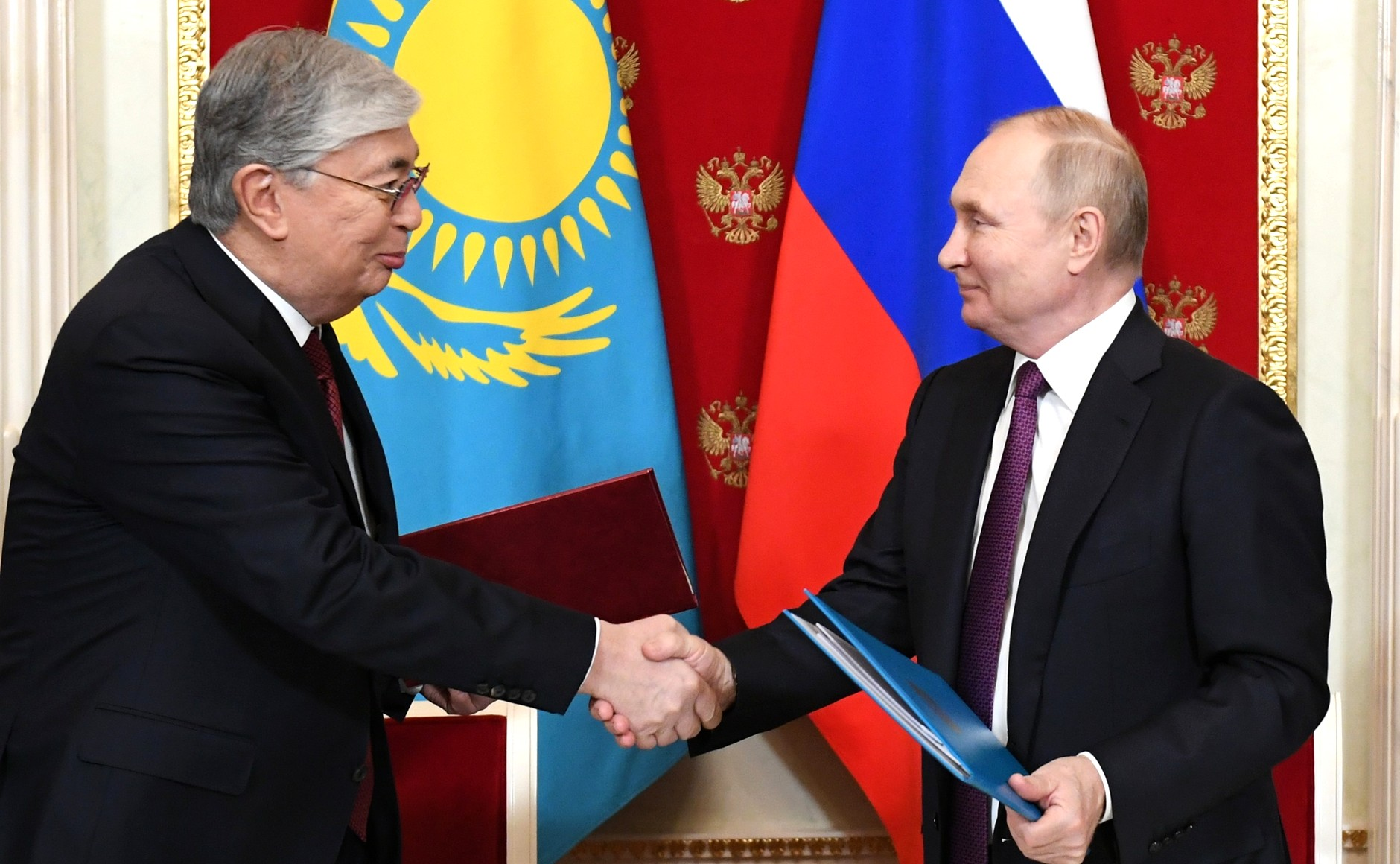
Vladimir Putin meeting with Kazakh President Kassym-Jomart Tokayev in Moscow, 28 November 2022

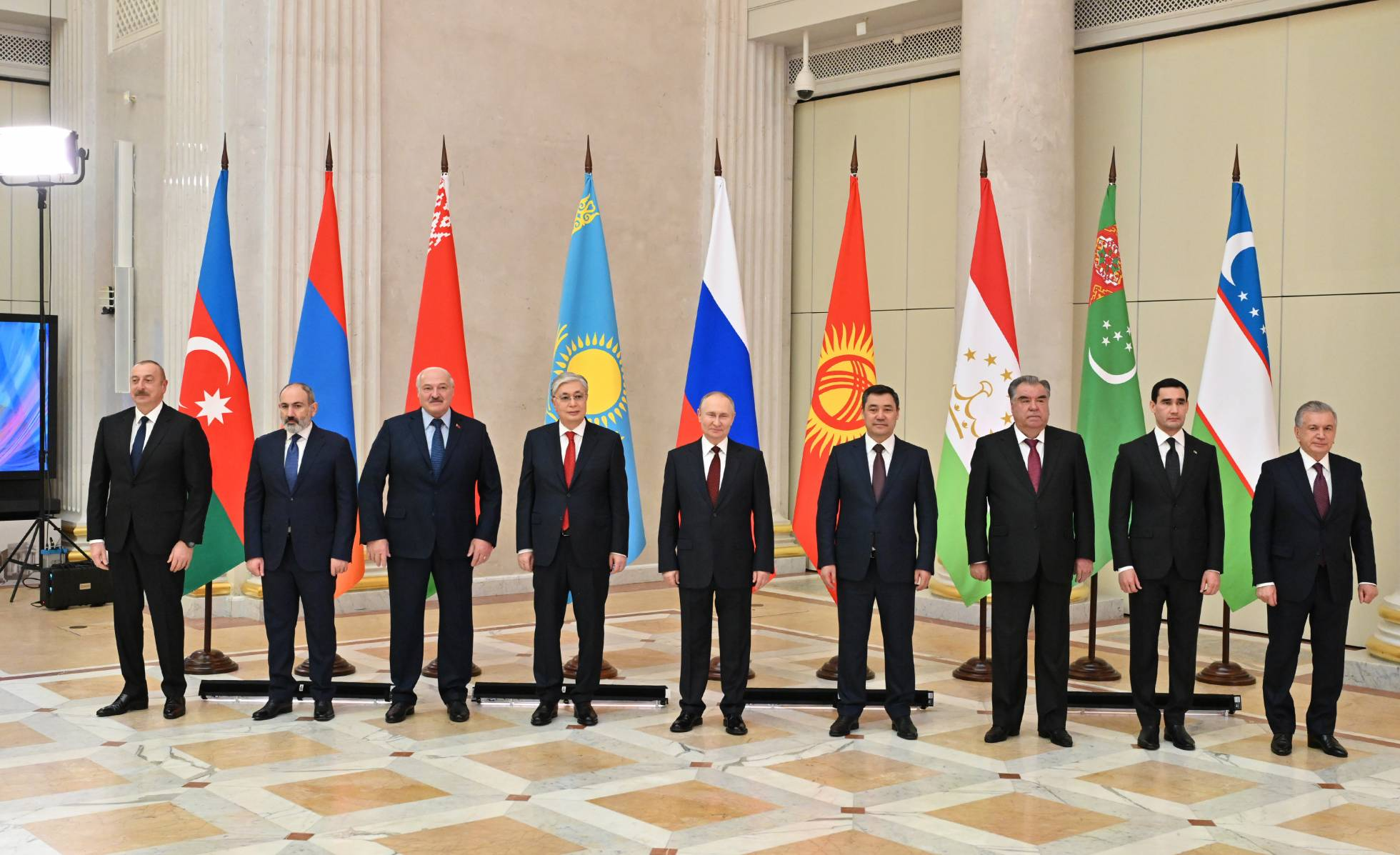
Vladimir Putin with the CIS leaders in St. Petersburg, 26 December 2022

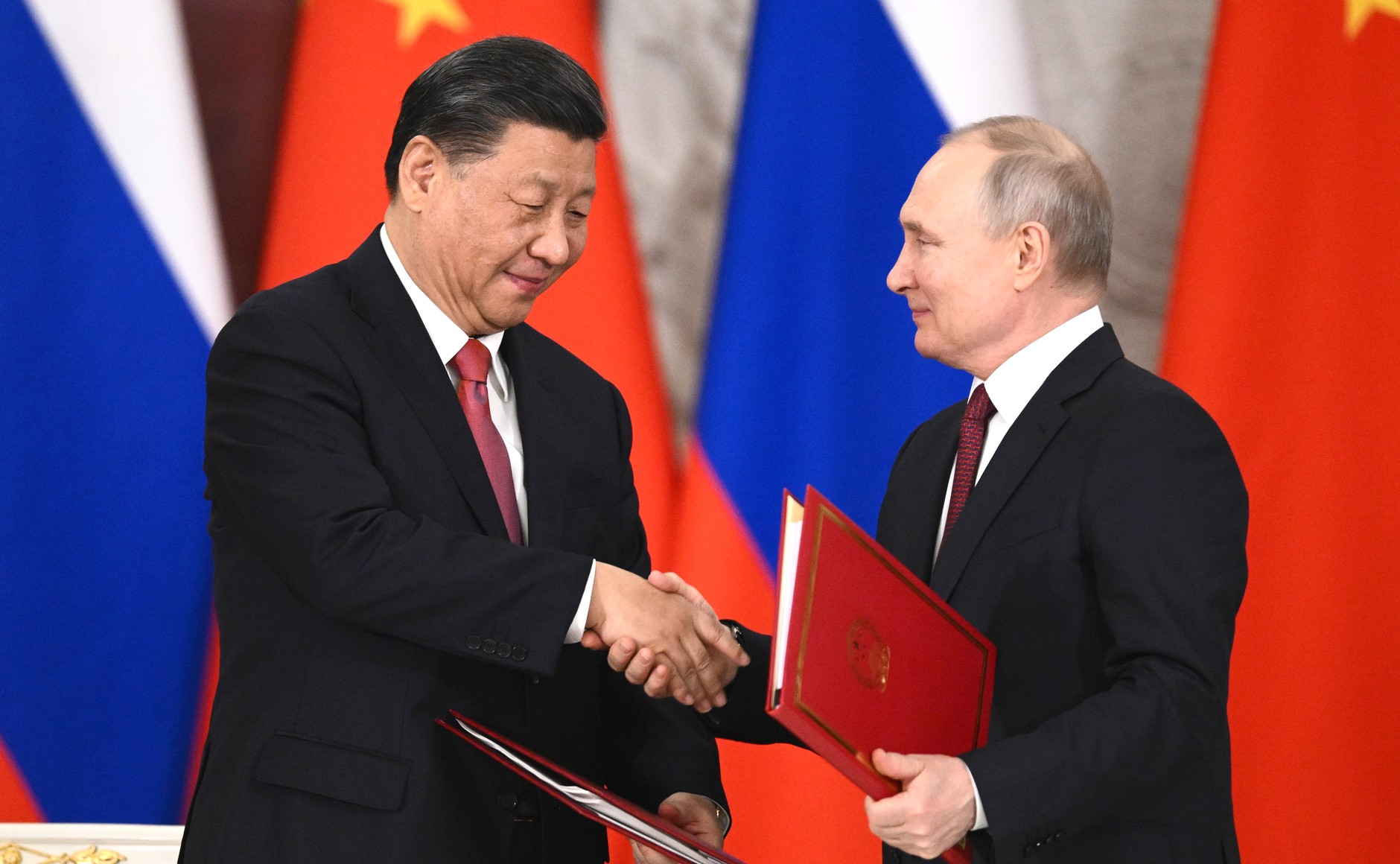
Vladimir Putin meeting with Chinese President & General Secretary of the Chinese Communist Party Xi Jinping on 21 March 2023

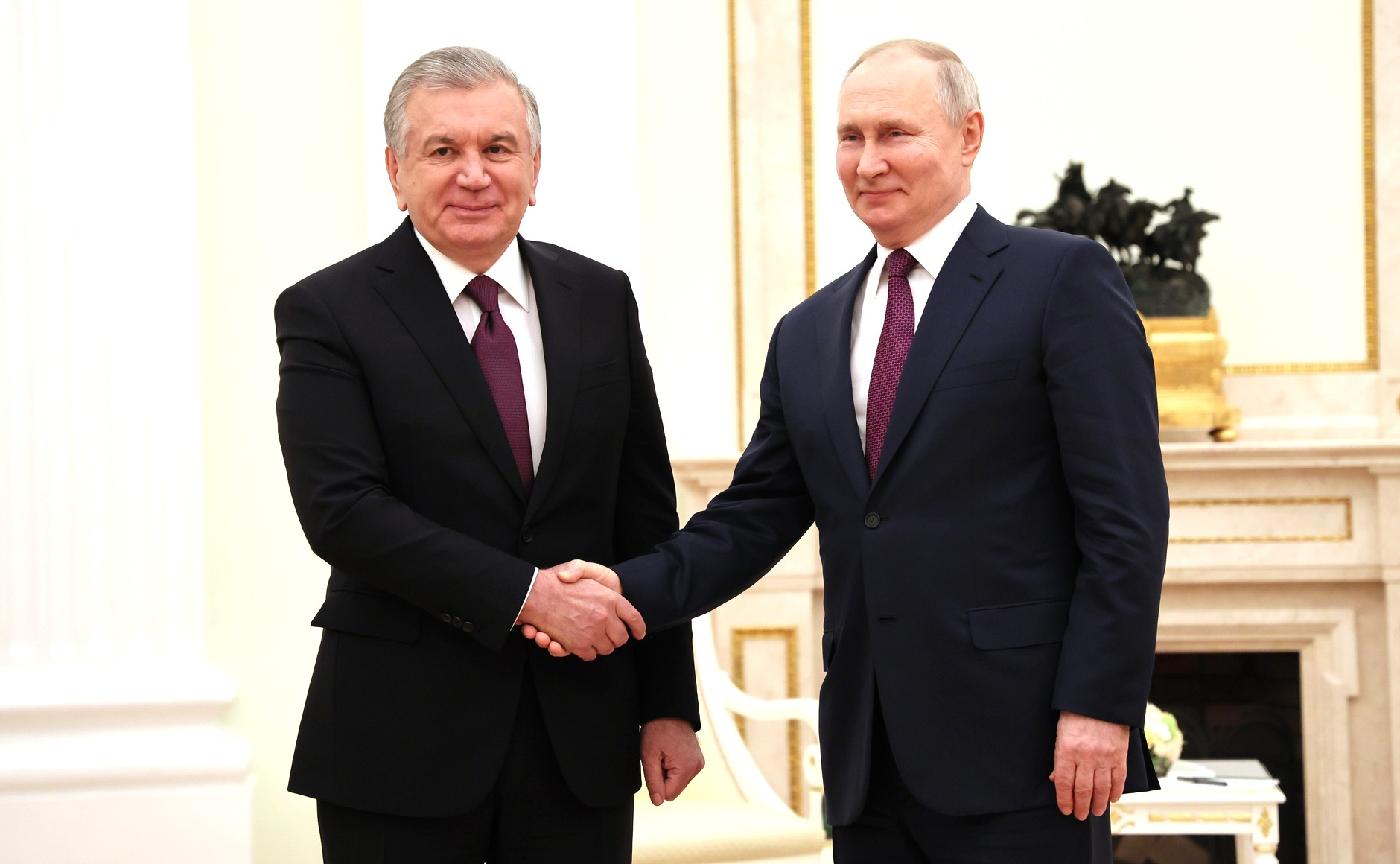
Vladimir Putin meeting with Uzbek President Shavkat Mirziyoev in Moscow, 8 May 2023

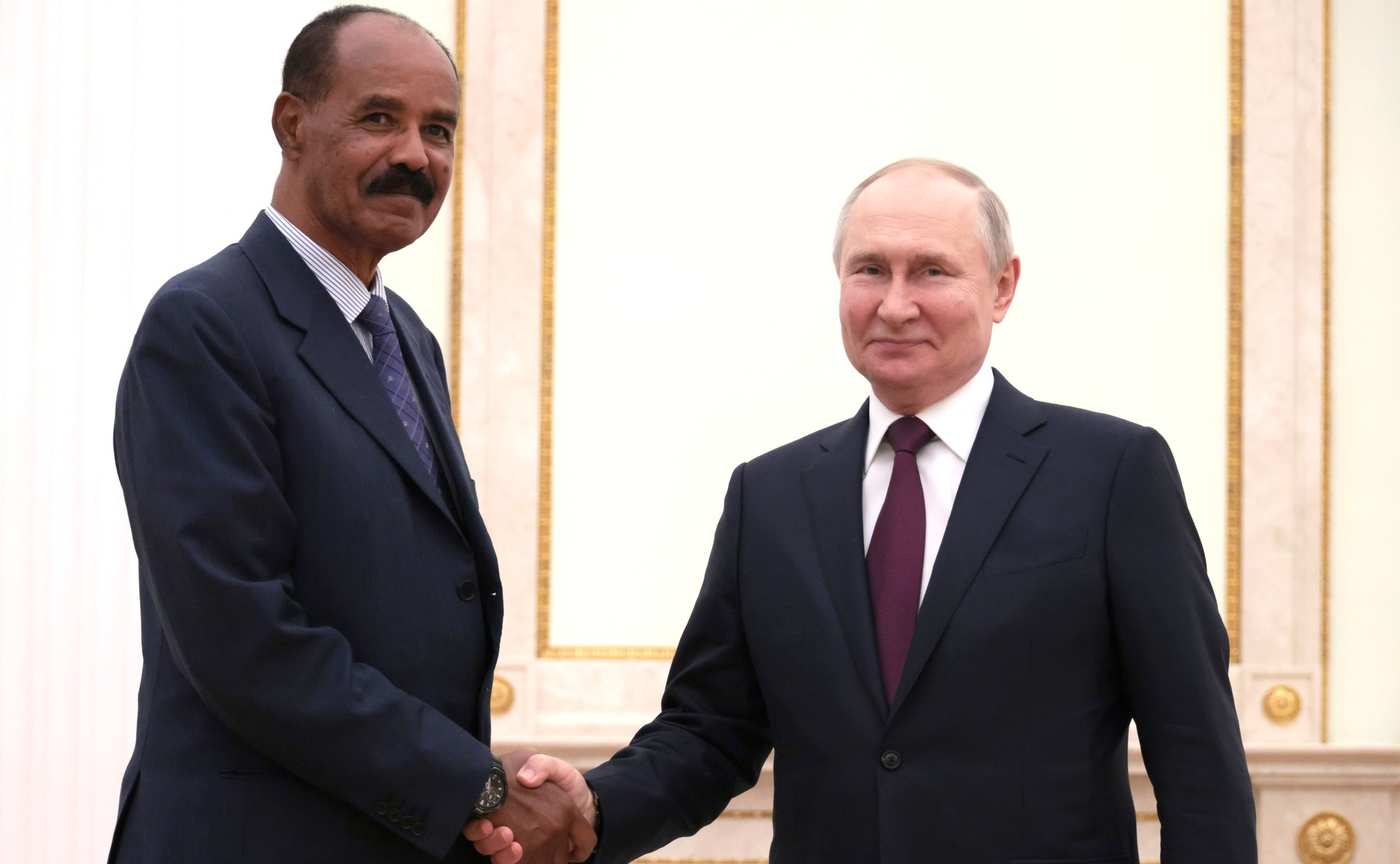
Vladimir Putin with Eritrean President Isaias Afwerki in Moscow, 31 May 2023

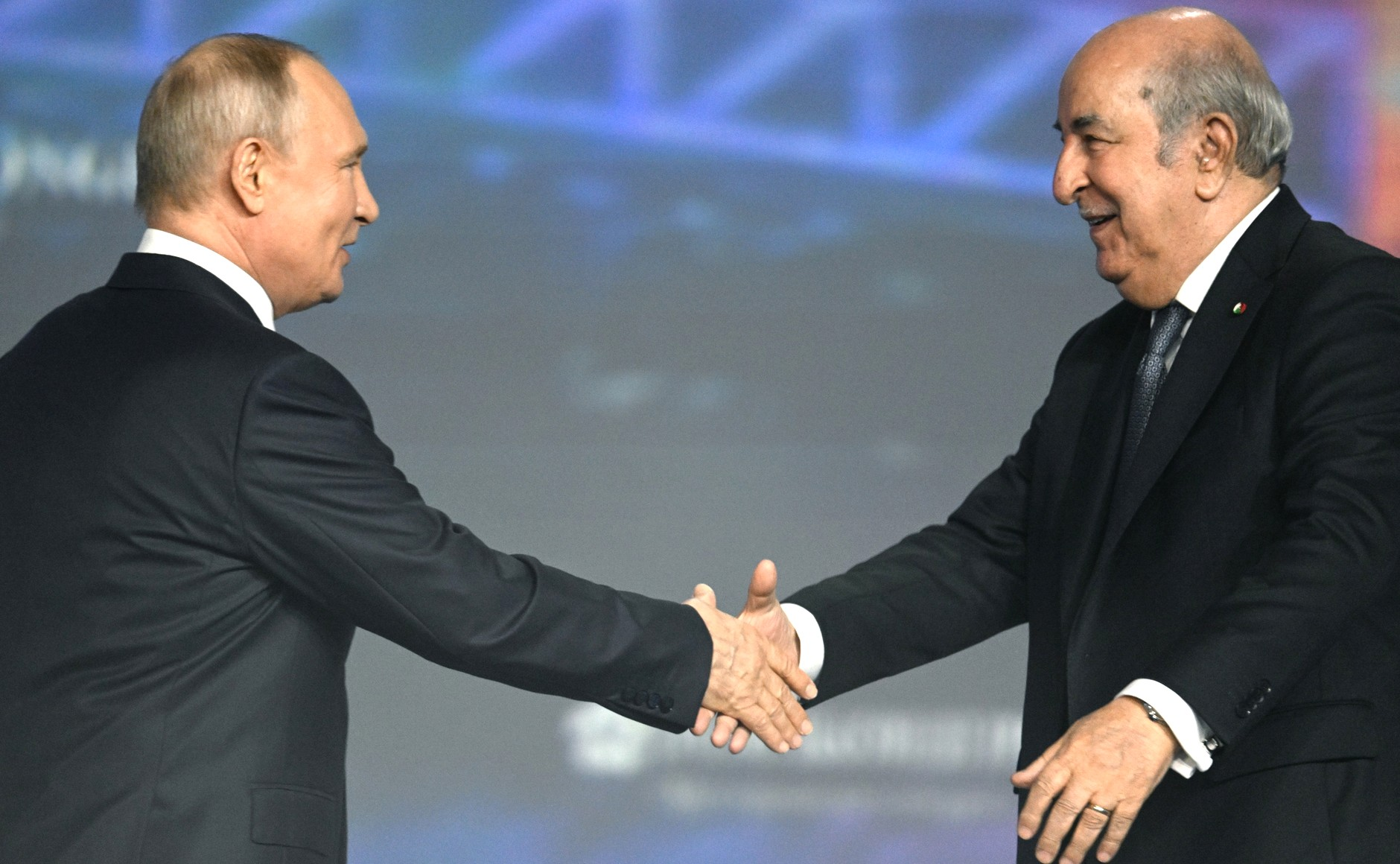
Vladimir Putin meeting with Algerian President Abdelmadjid Tebboune in St. Petersburg, 16 June 2023

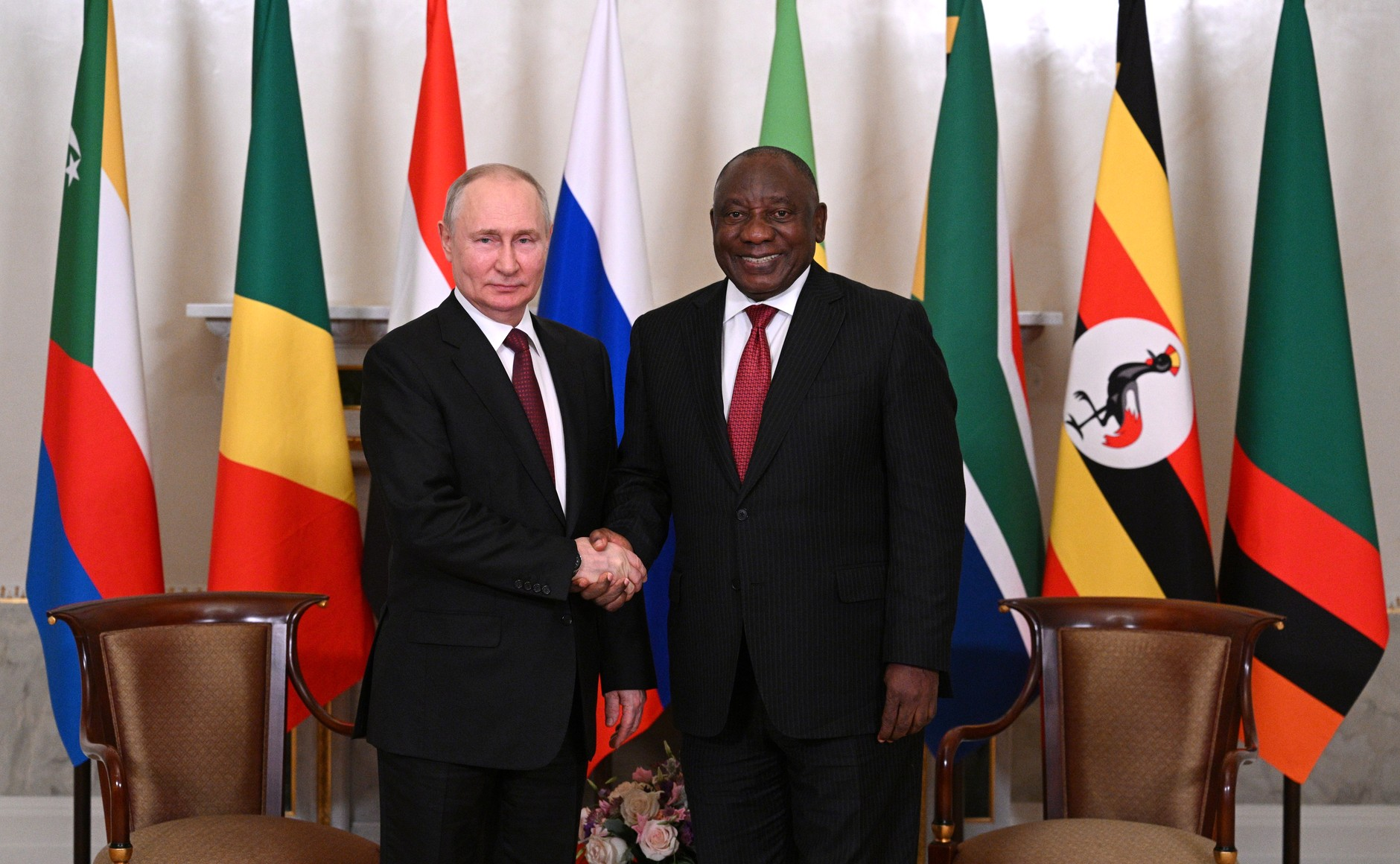
South African President Cyril Ramaphosa with Vladimir Putin in St. Petersburg on 17 June 2023

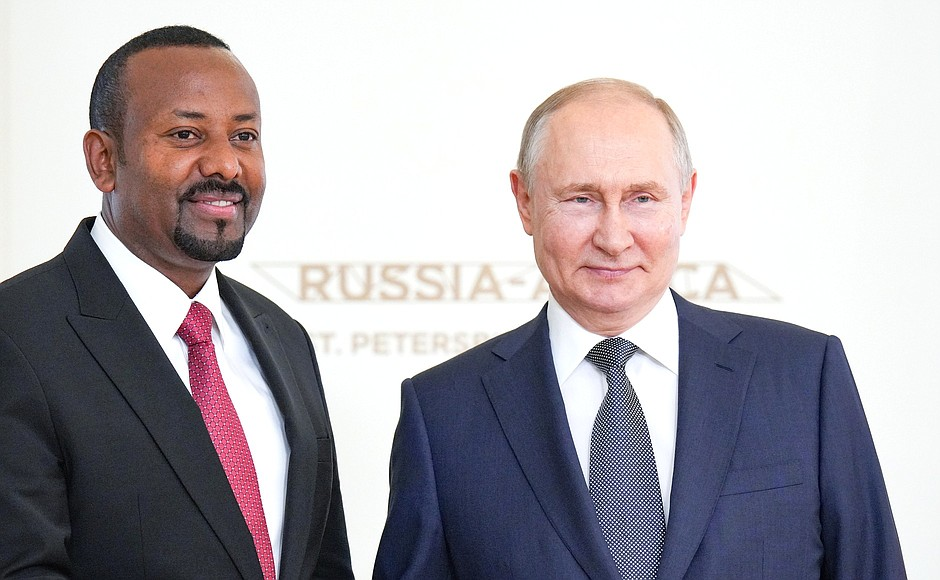
Vladimir Putin with Ethiopian Prime Minister Abiy Ahmed Ali in Moscow, 26 July 2023

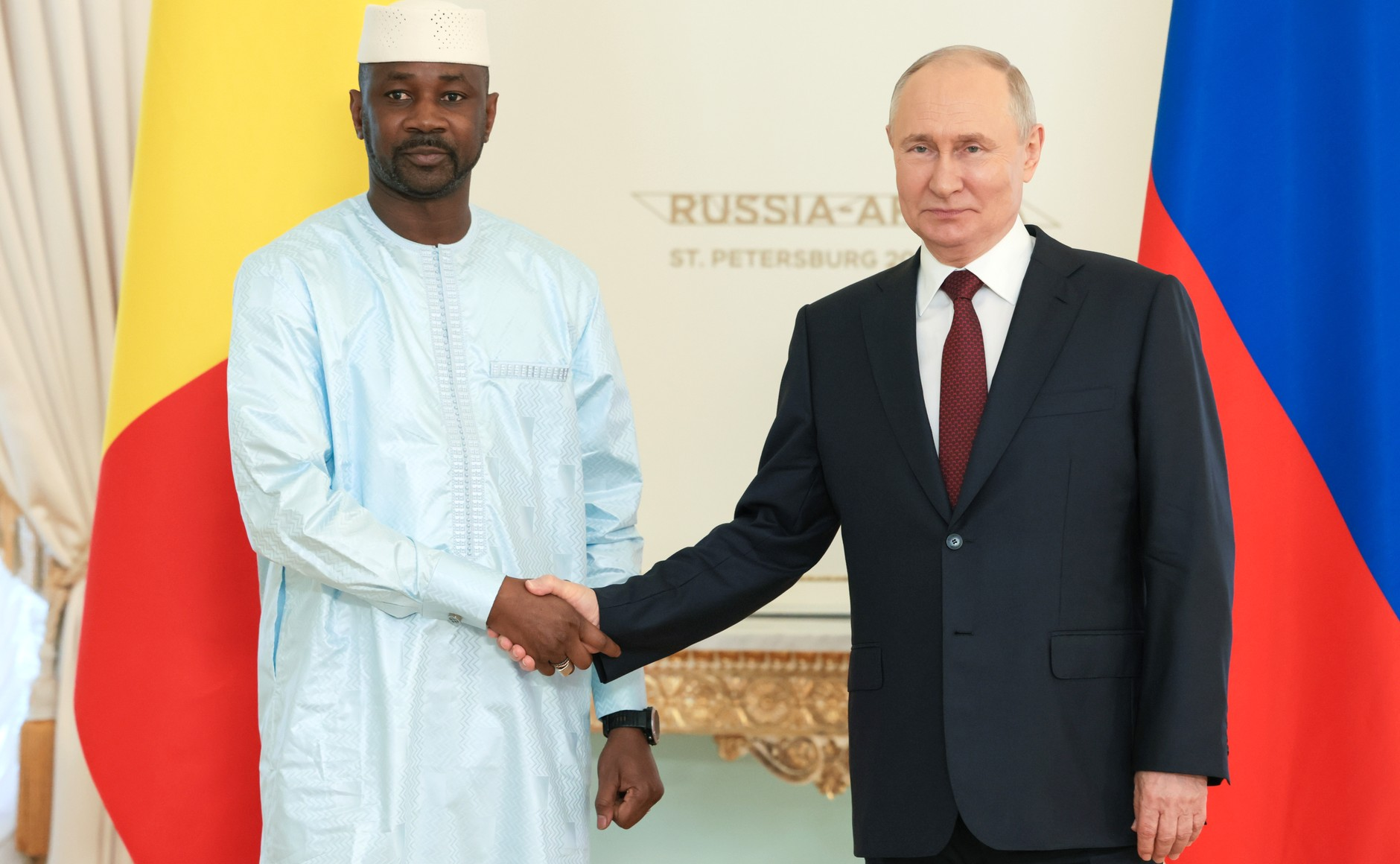
Vladimir Putin with Malian President Assimi Goïta in Moscow, 29 July 2023

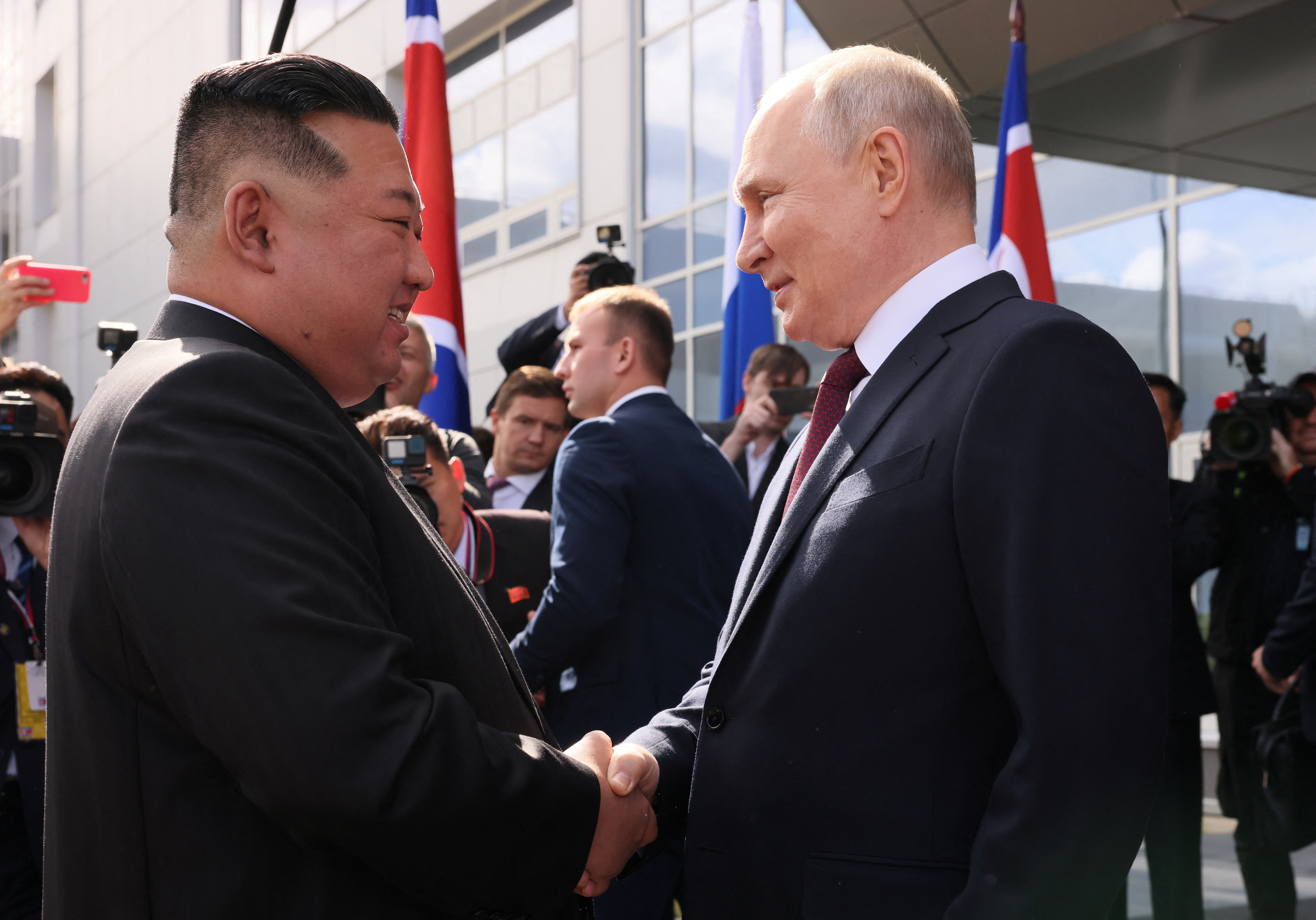
Vladimir Putin meeting with President of the State Affairs Commission & General Secretary of the Workers' Party of Korea Kim Jong Un on 13 September 2023

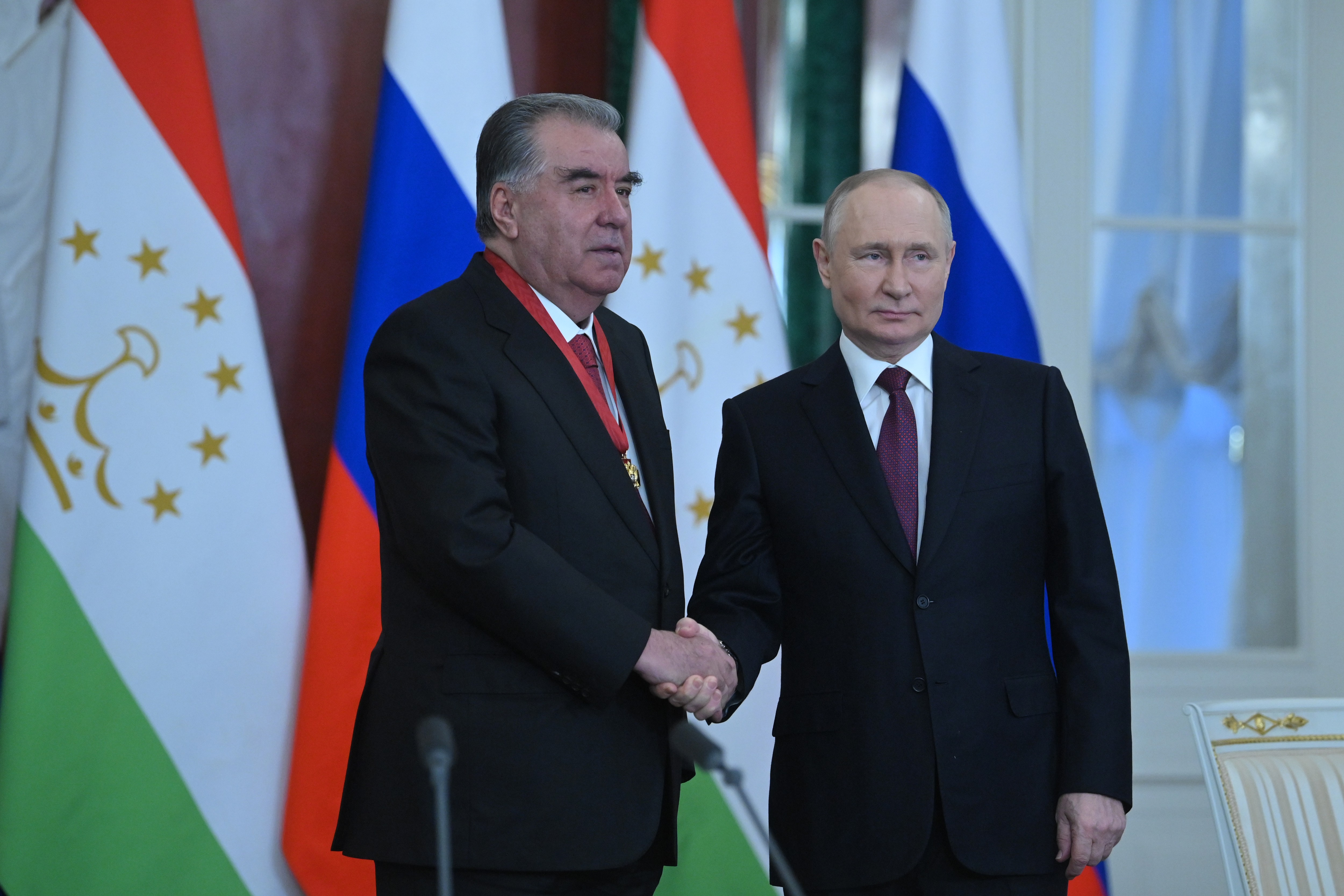
Vladimir Putin meeting with Tajikistani President Emomali Rahmon in Moscow, 21 November 2023

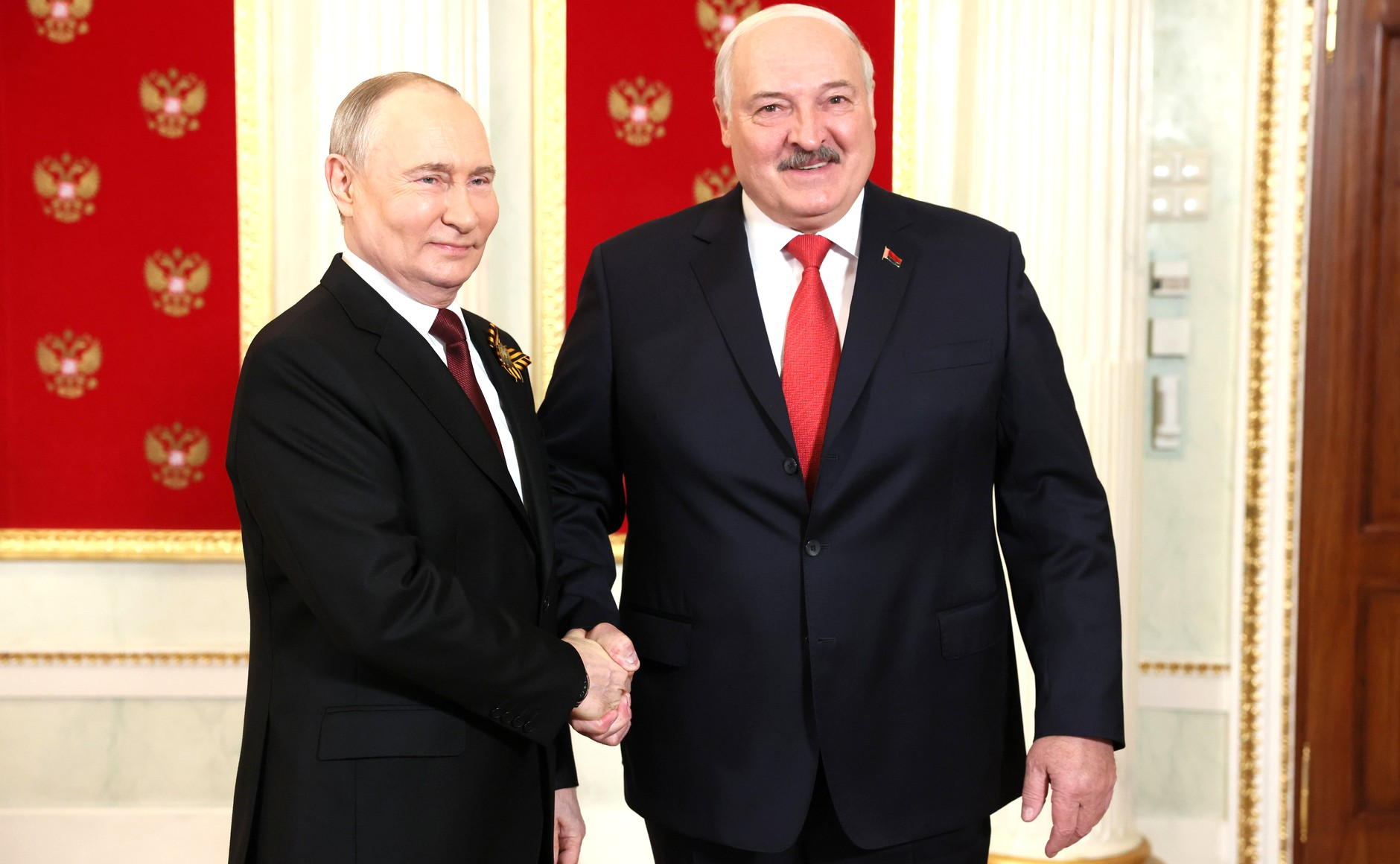
Vladimir Putin with Belarusian President Alexander Lukashenko in Moscow on 9 May 2024

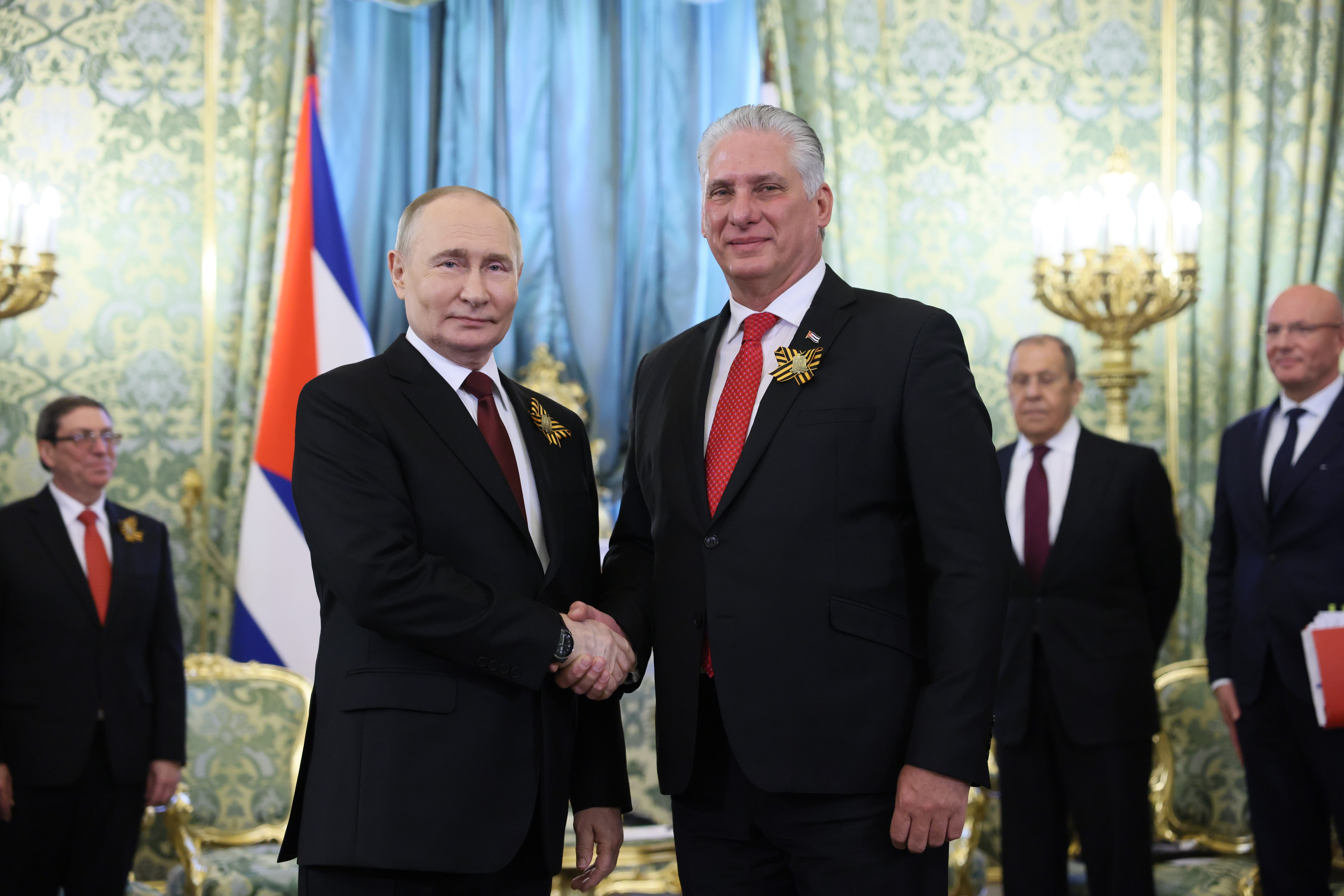
Vladimir Putin with Cuban leader Miguel Díaz-Canel in Moscow on 9 May 2024

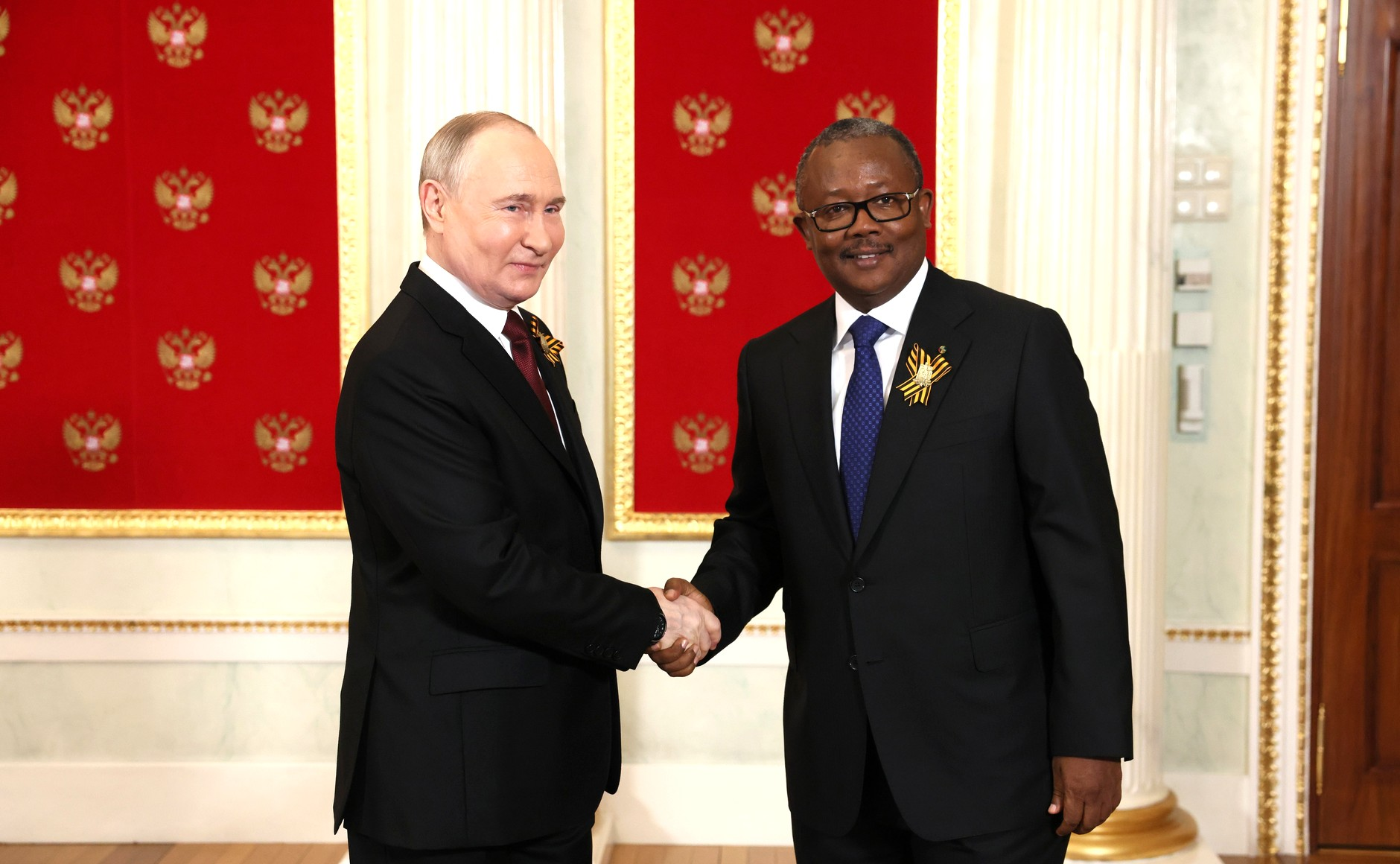
Vladimir Putin meeting with Bissau-Guinean President Umaro Sissoco Embaló in Moscow on 9 May 2024

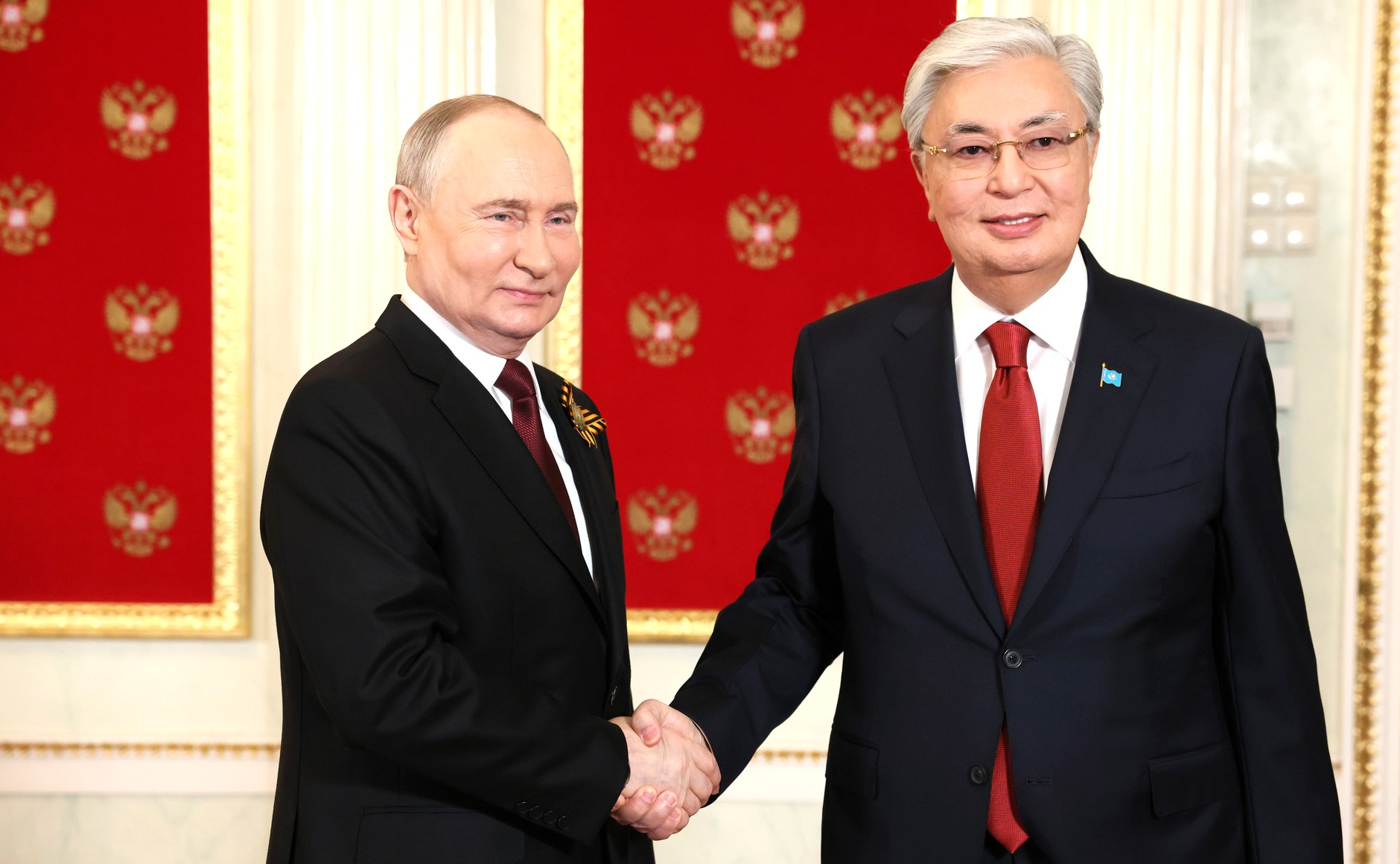
Vladimir Putin meeting with Kazakh President Kassym-Jomart Tokayev in Moscow on 9 May 2024

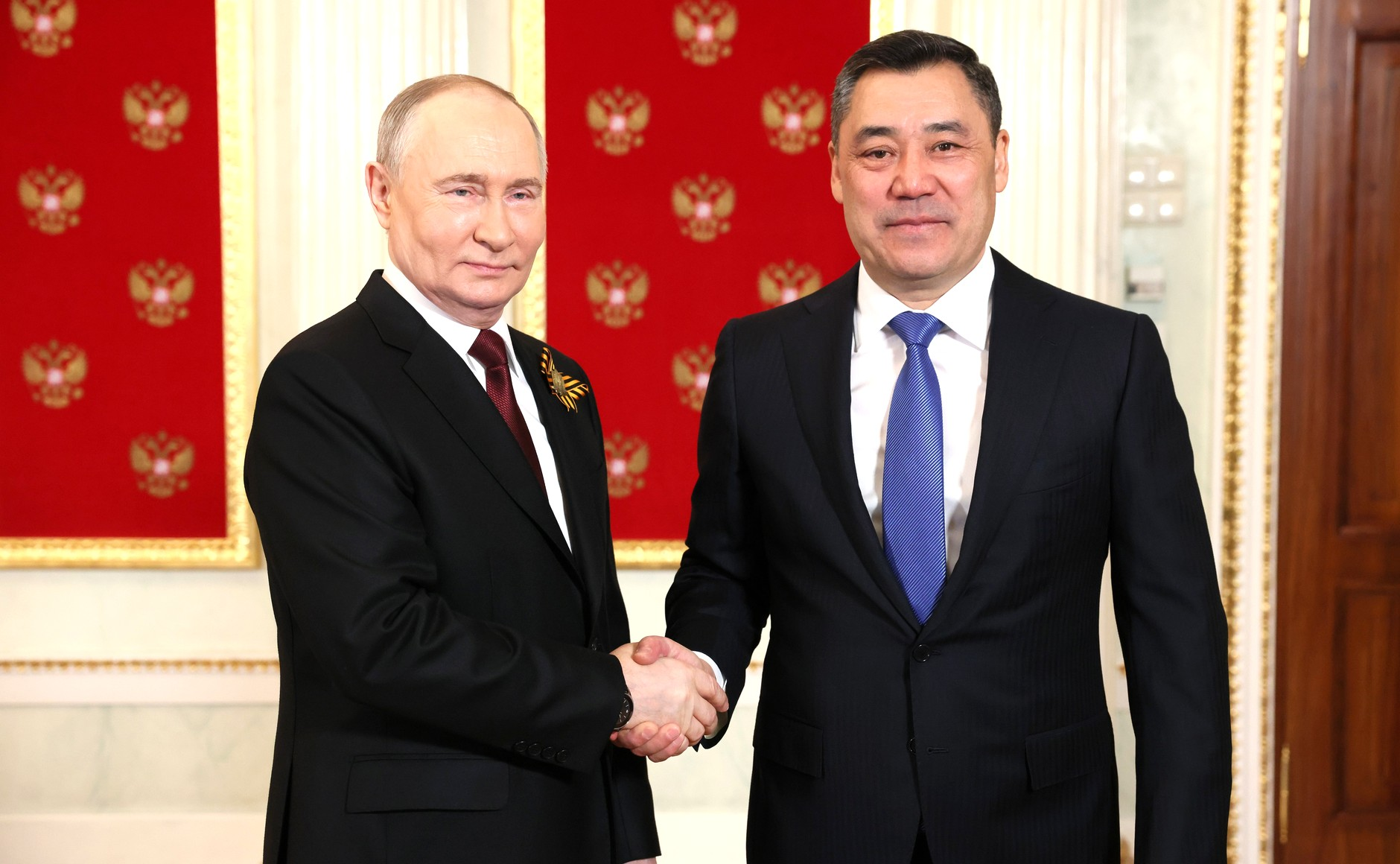
Vladimir Putin meeting with Kyrgyz President Sadyr Japarov in Moscow on 9 May 2024

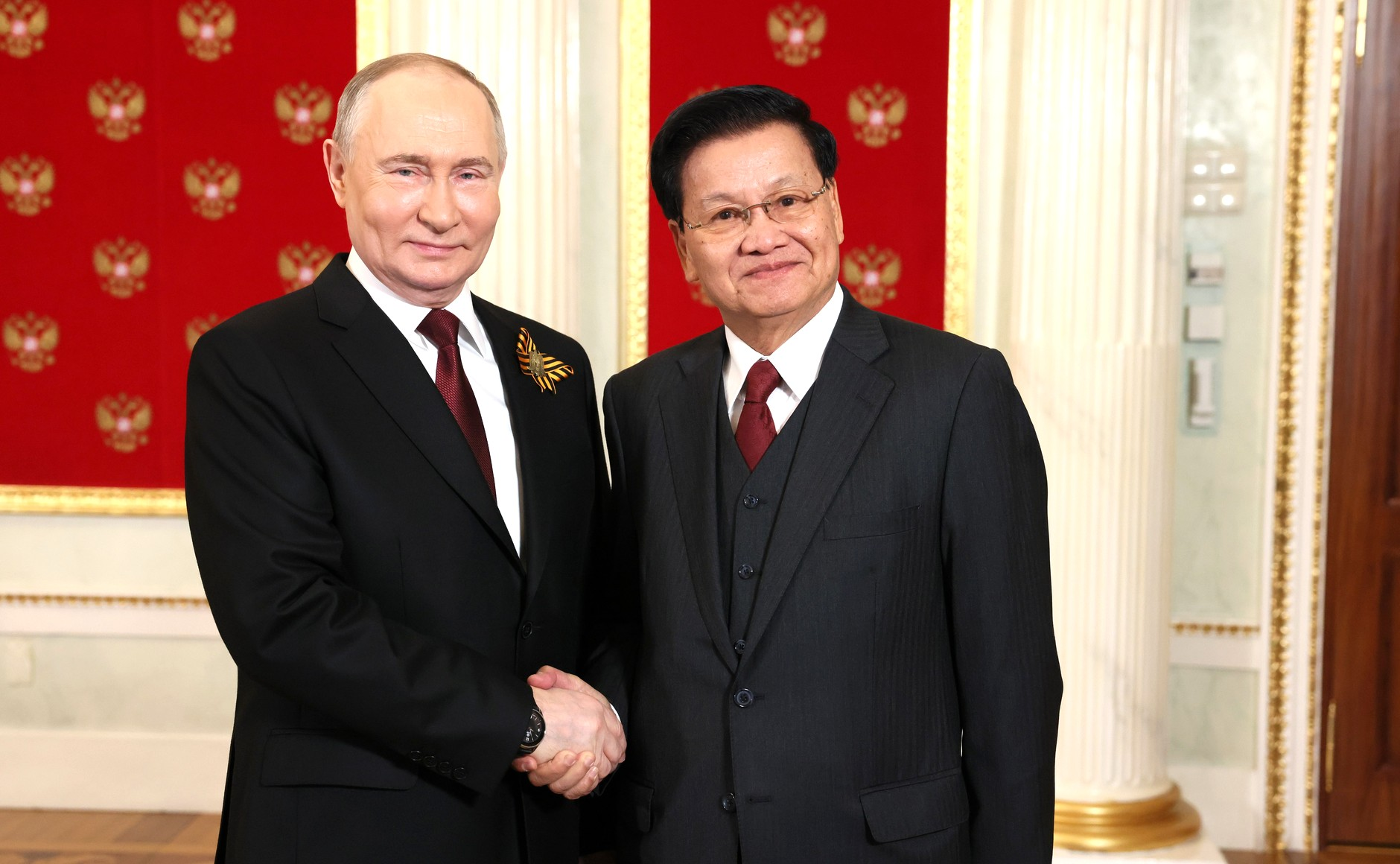
Vladimir Putin meeting with Laotian President & General Secretary of the Lao People's Revolutionary Party Thongloun Sisoulith in Moscow on 9 May 2024

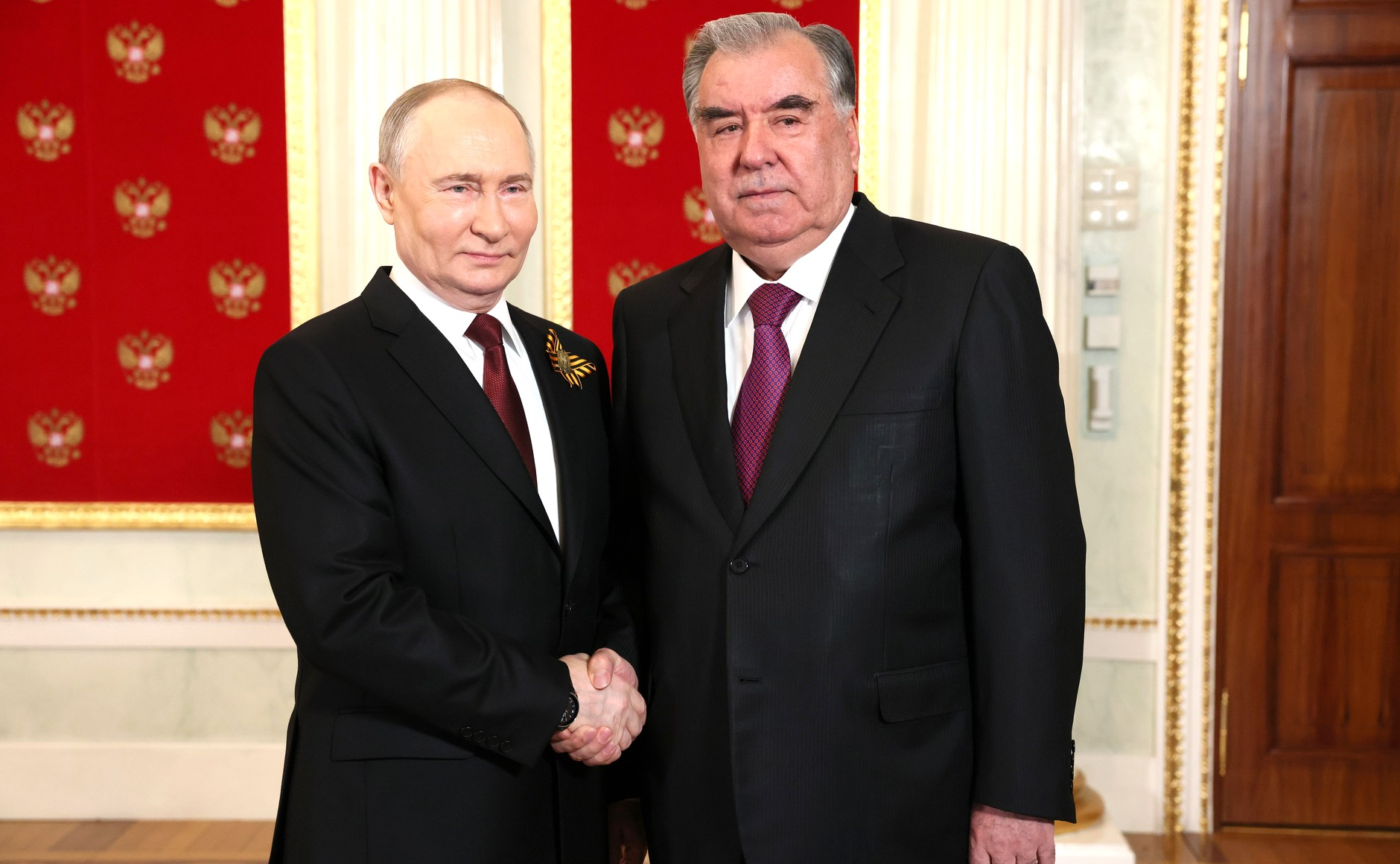
Vladimir Putin meeting with Tajikistani President Emomali Rahmon in Moscow on 9 May 2024

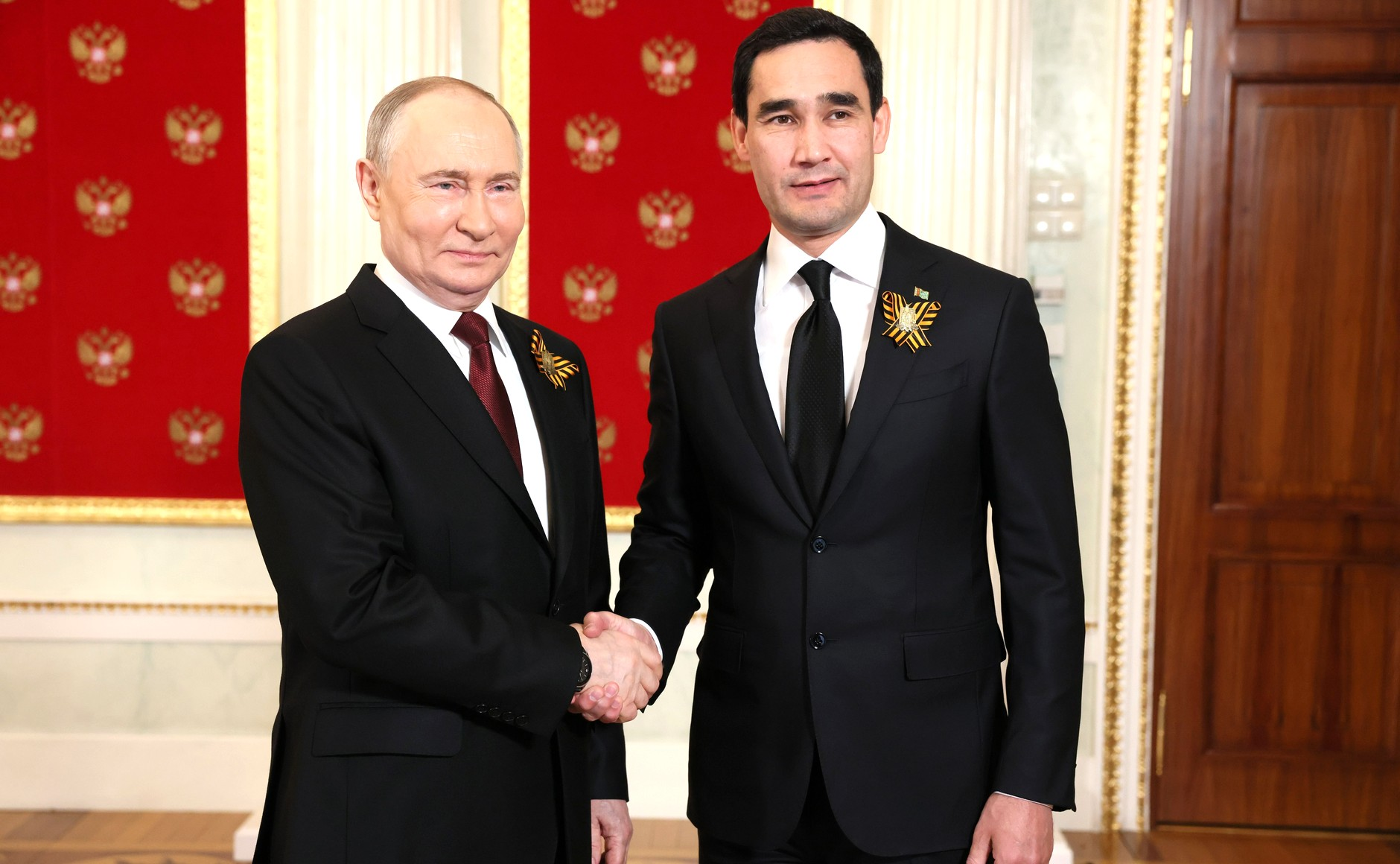
Vladimir Putin meeting with Turkmen President Serdar Berdymuhammedow in Moscow on 9 May 2024

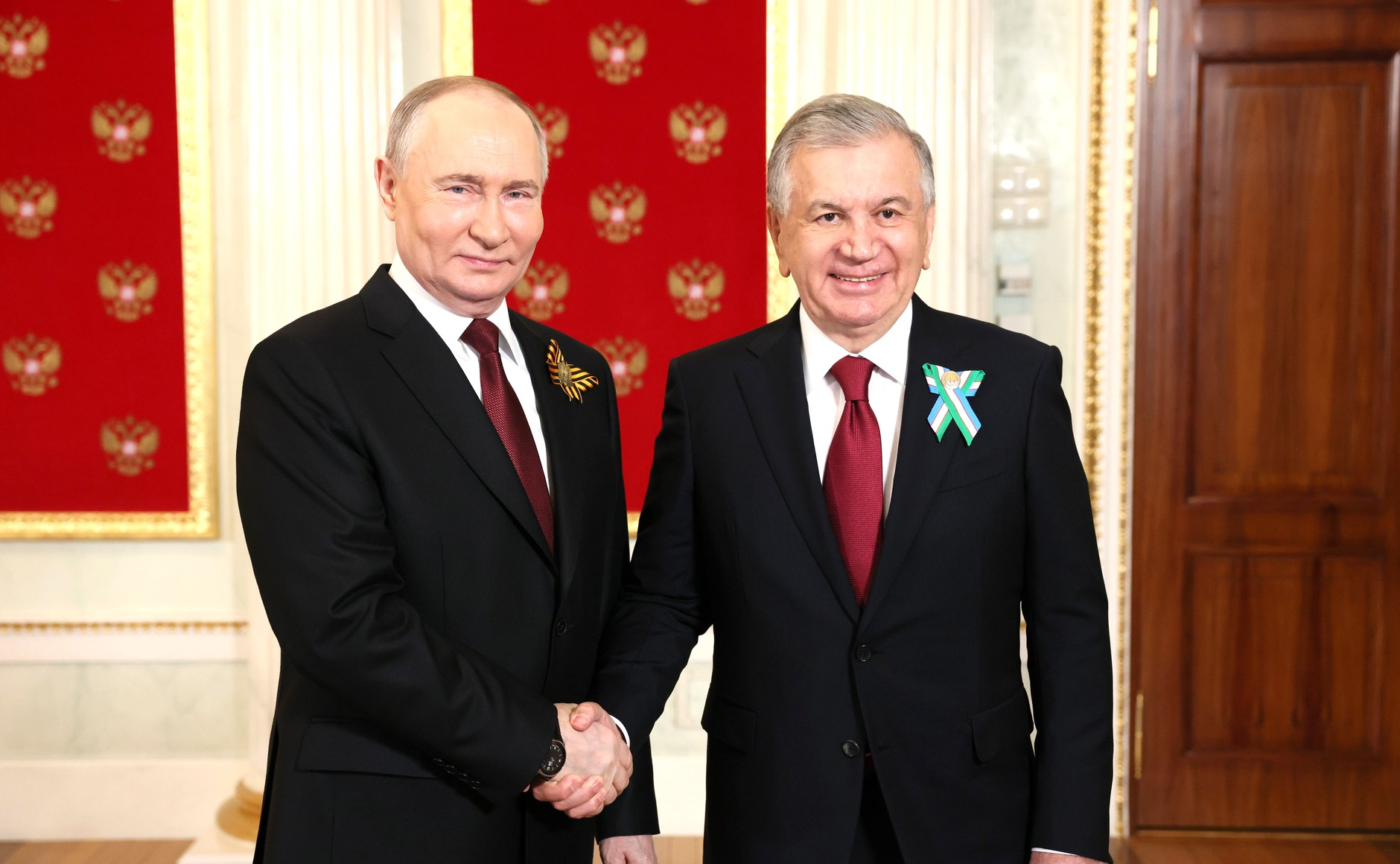
Vladimir Putin meeting with Uzbek President Shavkat Mirziyoev in Moscow on 9 May 2024

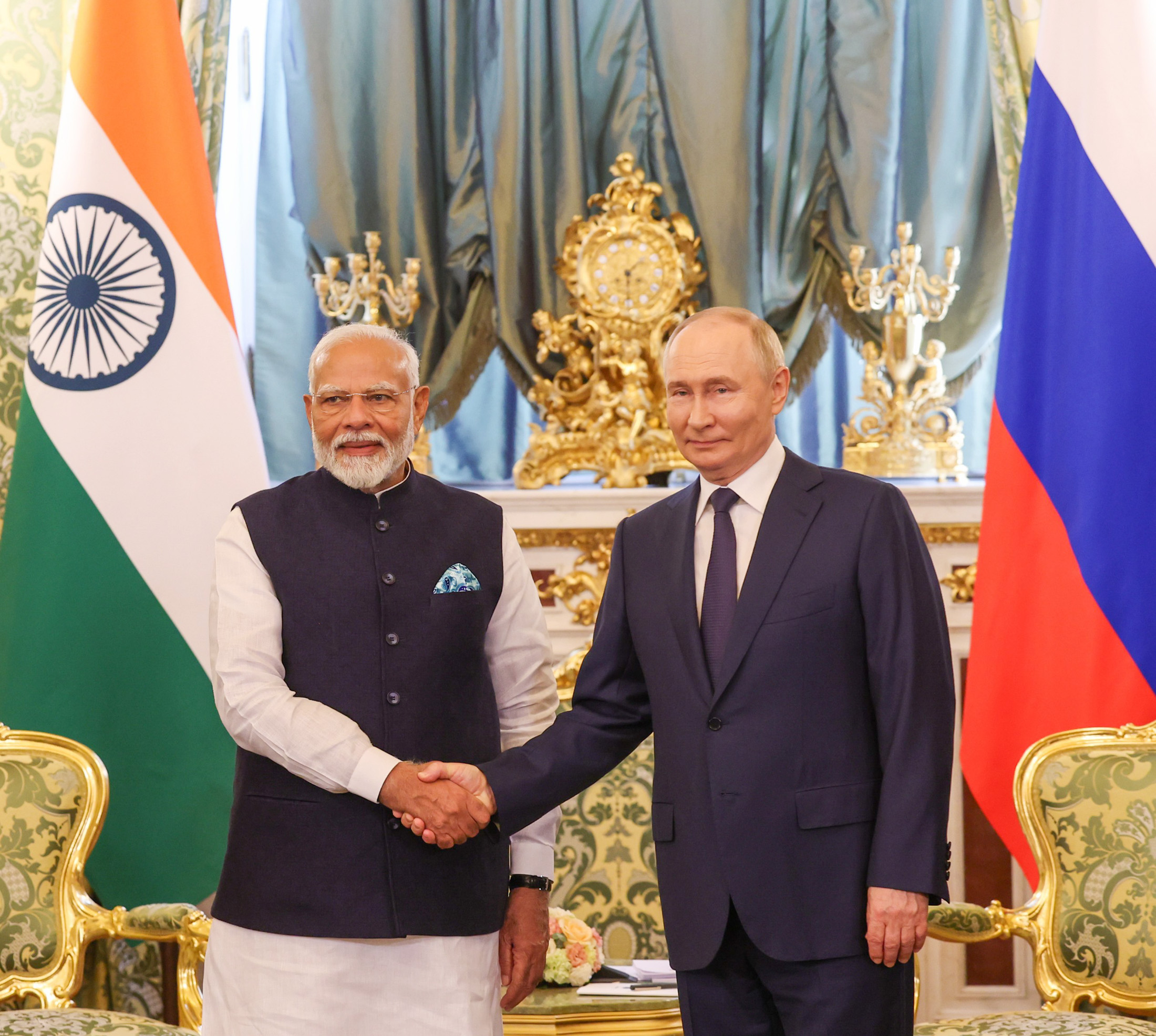
Vladimir Putin meeting Indian Prime Minister Narendra Modi on 8 July 2024

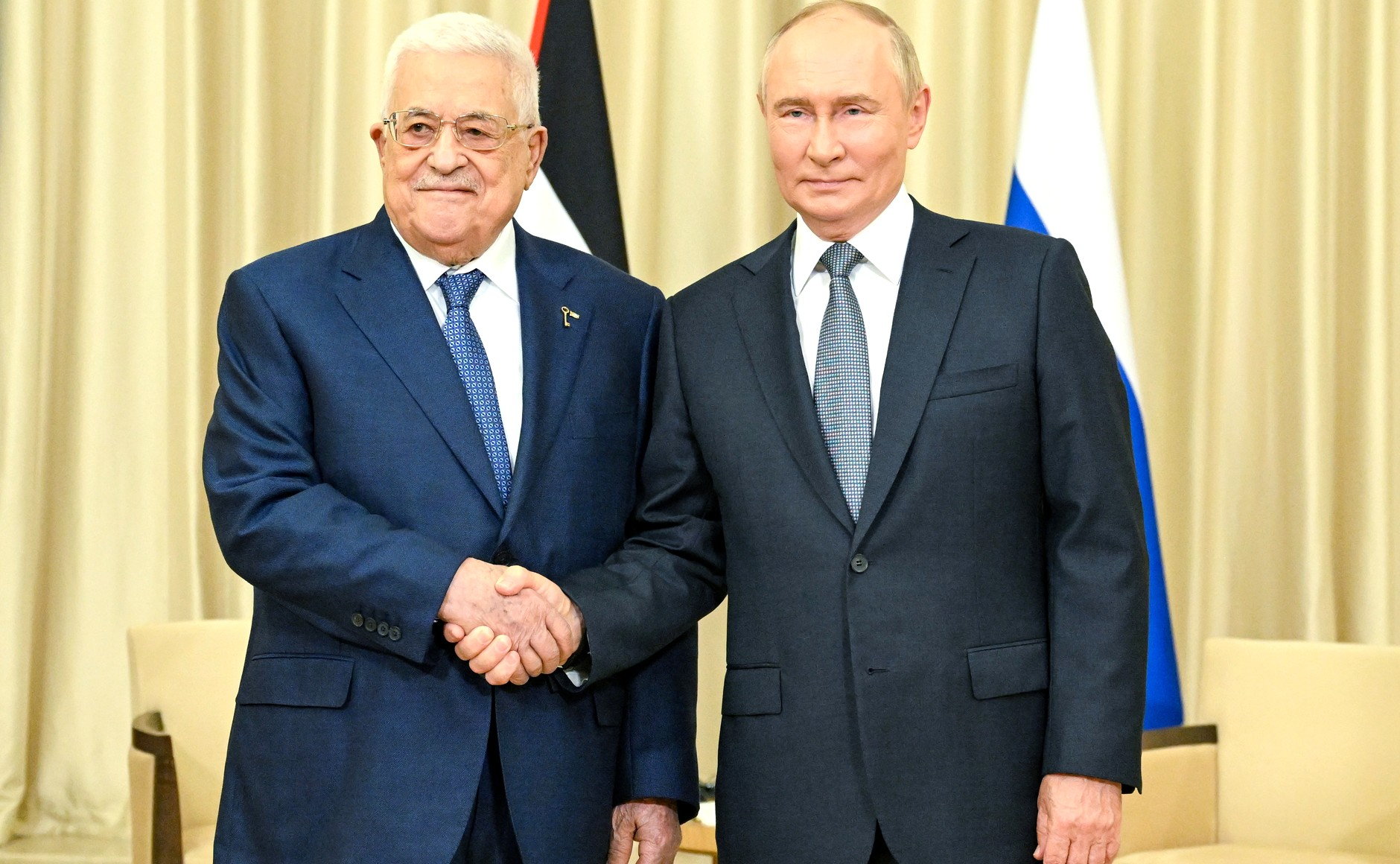
Vladimir Putin meeting with Palestinian President Mahmoud Abbas at Novo-Ogaryovo, 13 August 2024

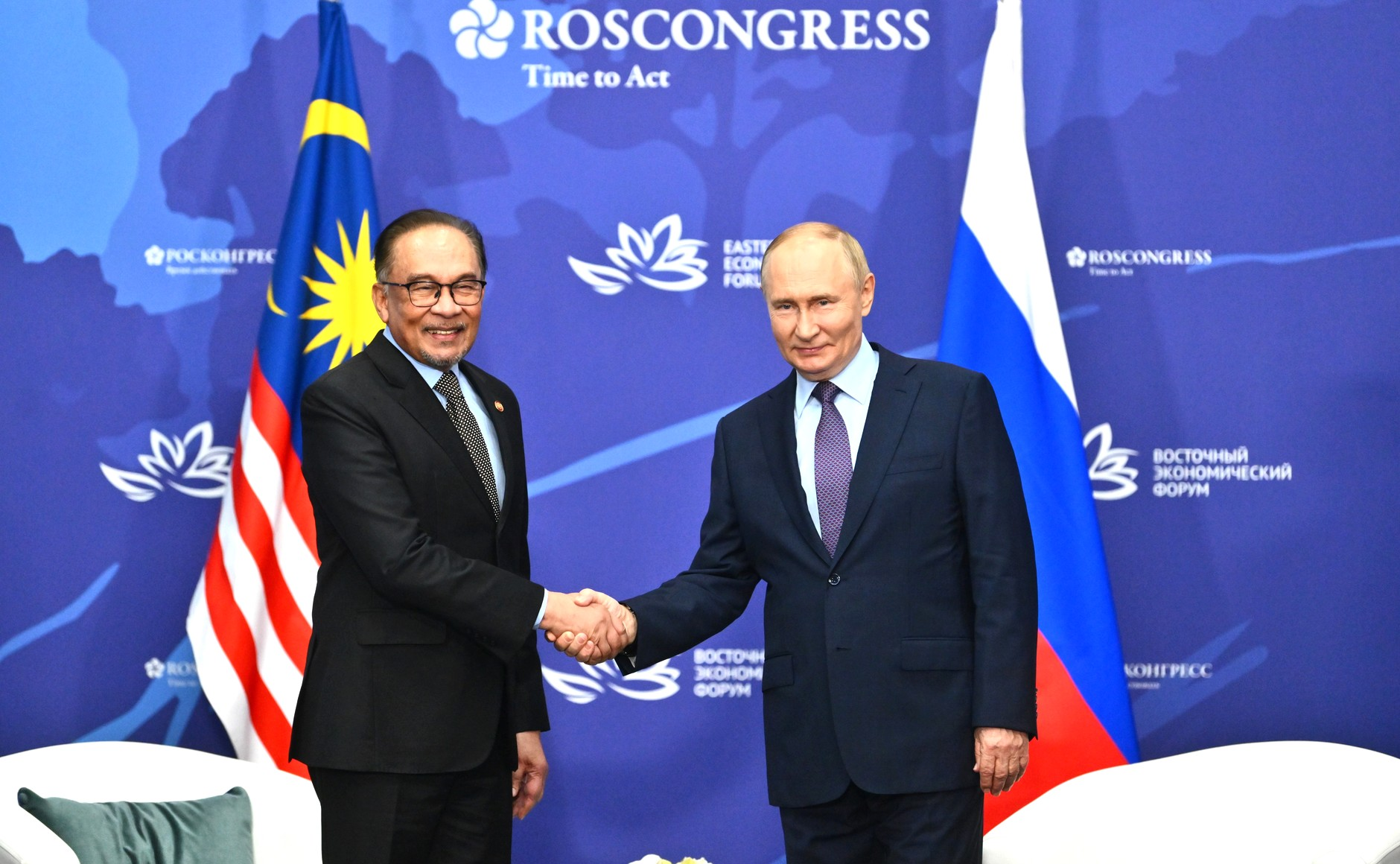
Vladimir Putin with Malaysian Prime Minister Anwar Ibrahim in Vladivostok, 4 September 2024

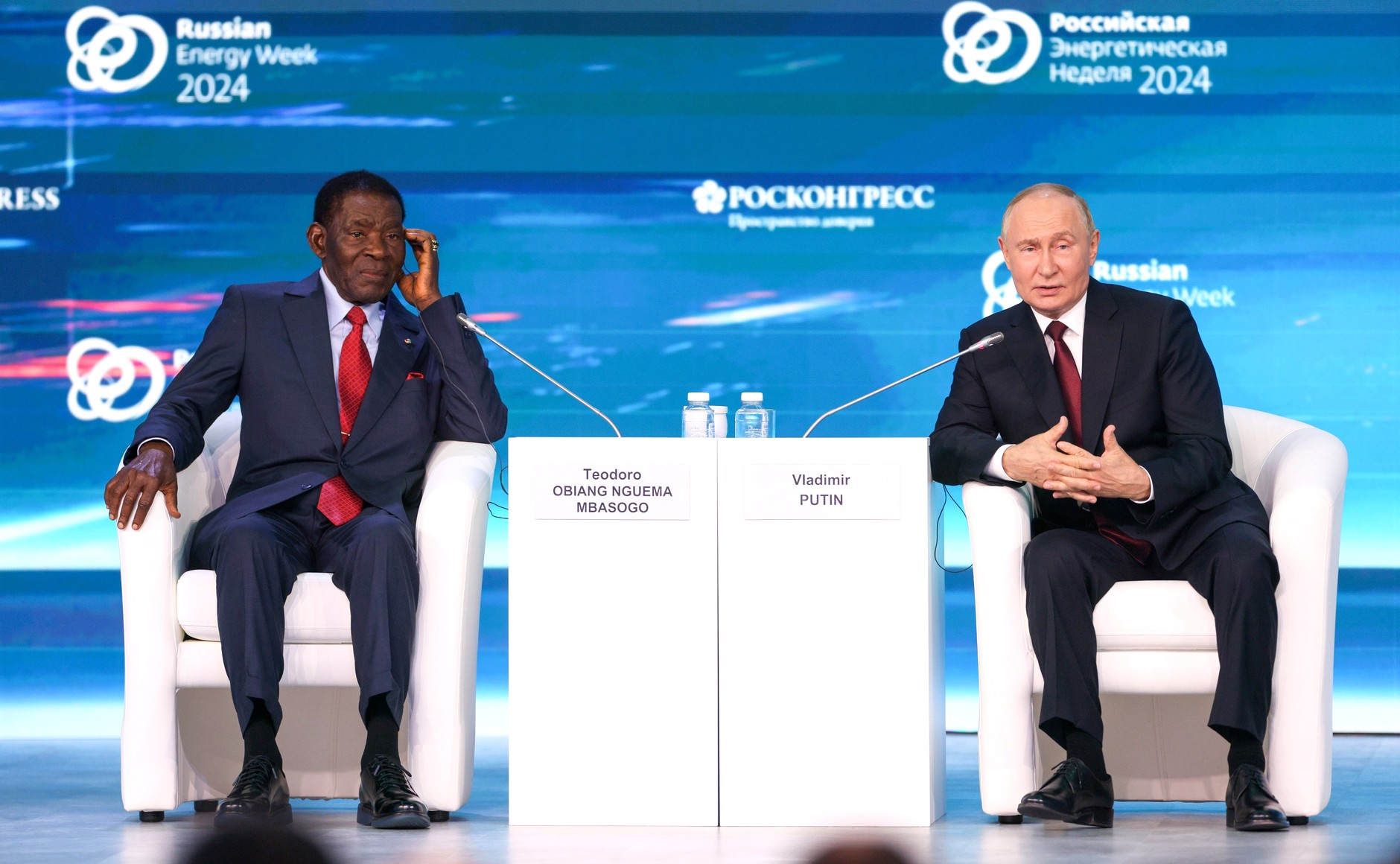
Vladimir Putin with Equatoguinean President Teodoro Obiang Nguema Mbasogo in Moscow, 26 September 2024

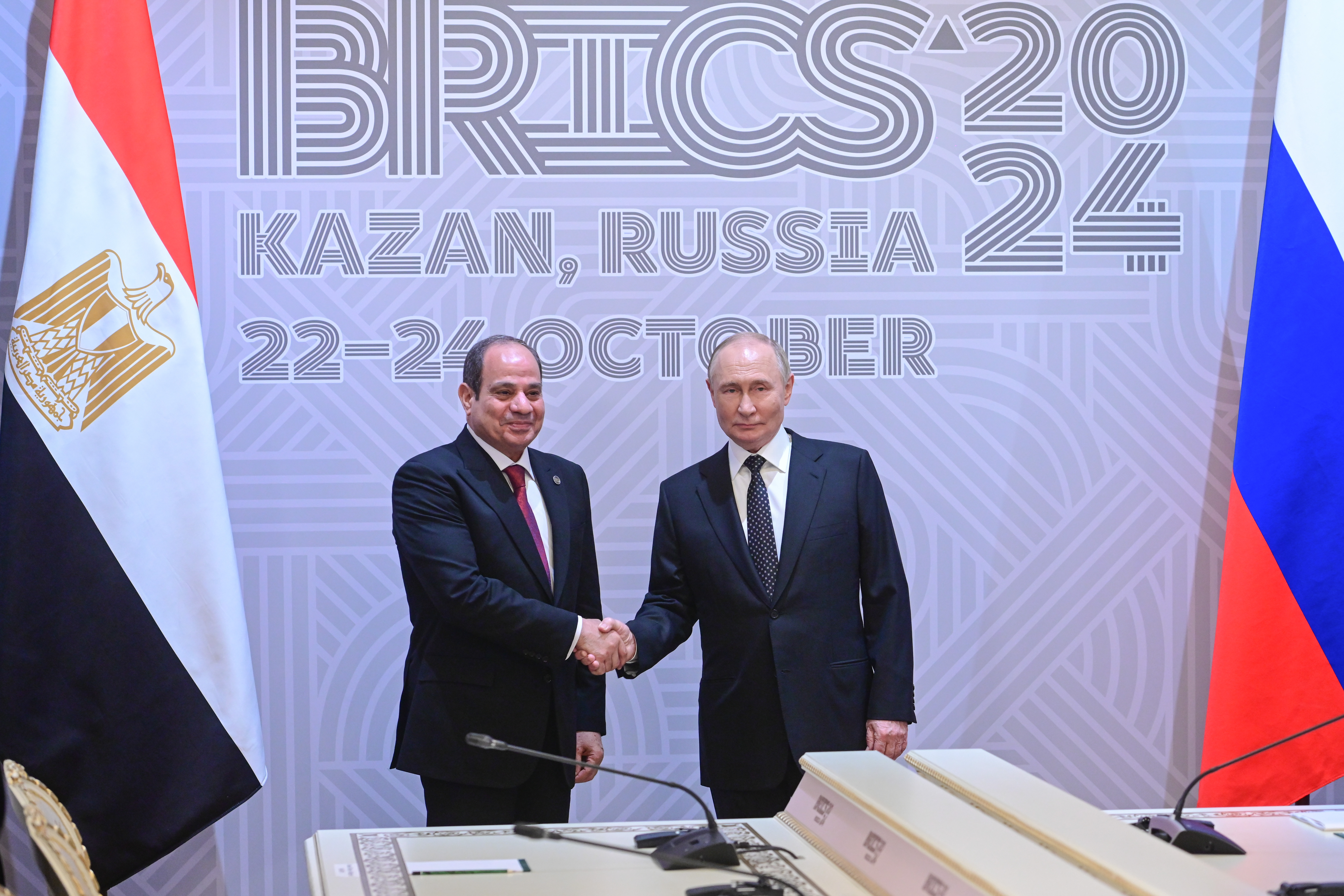
Vladimir Putin with Egyptian President Abdel Fattah el-Sisi in Kazan on 22 October 2024

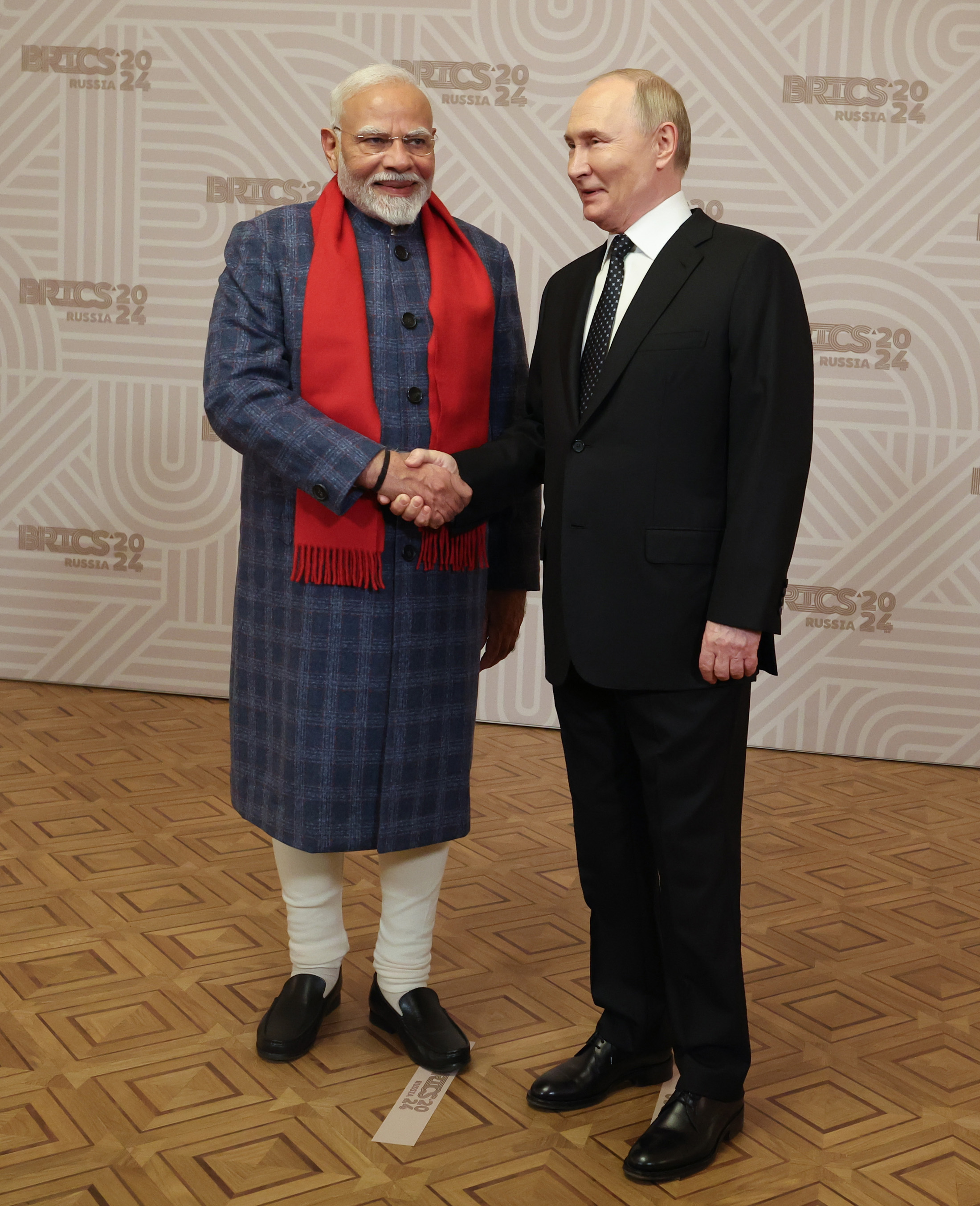
Vladimir Putin with Indian Prime Minister Narendra Modi in Kazan on 22 October 2024

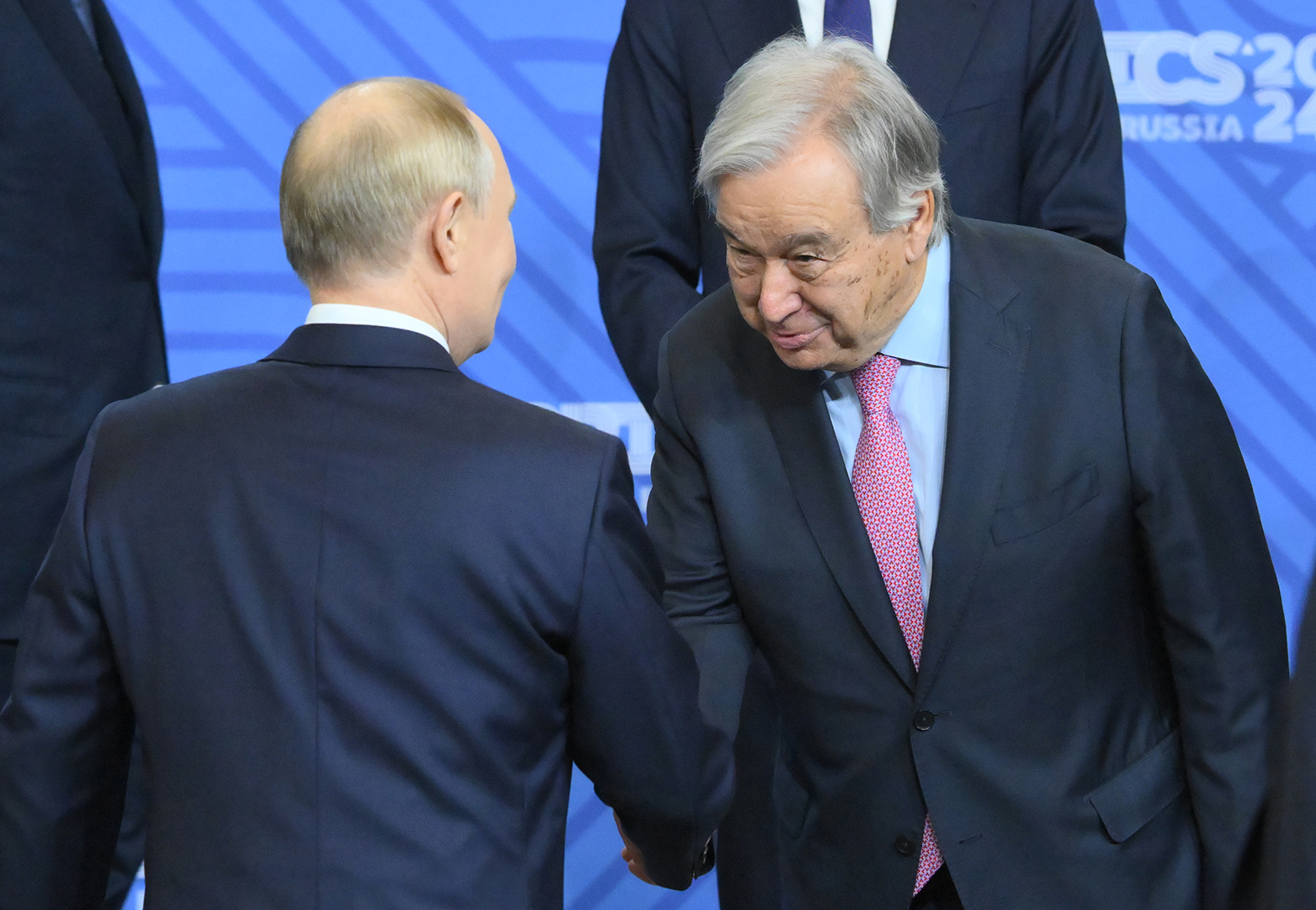
Vladimir Putin with UN Secretary-General António Guterres in Kazan on 24 October 2024

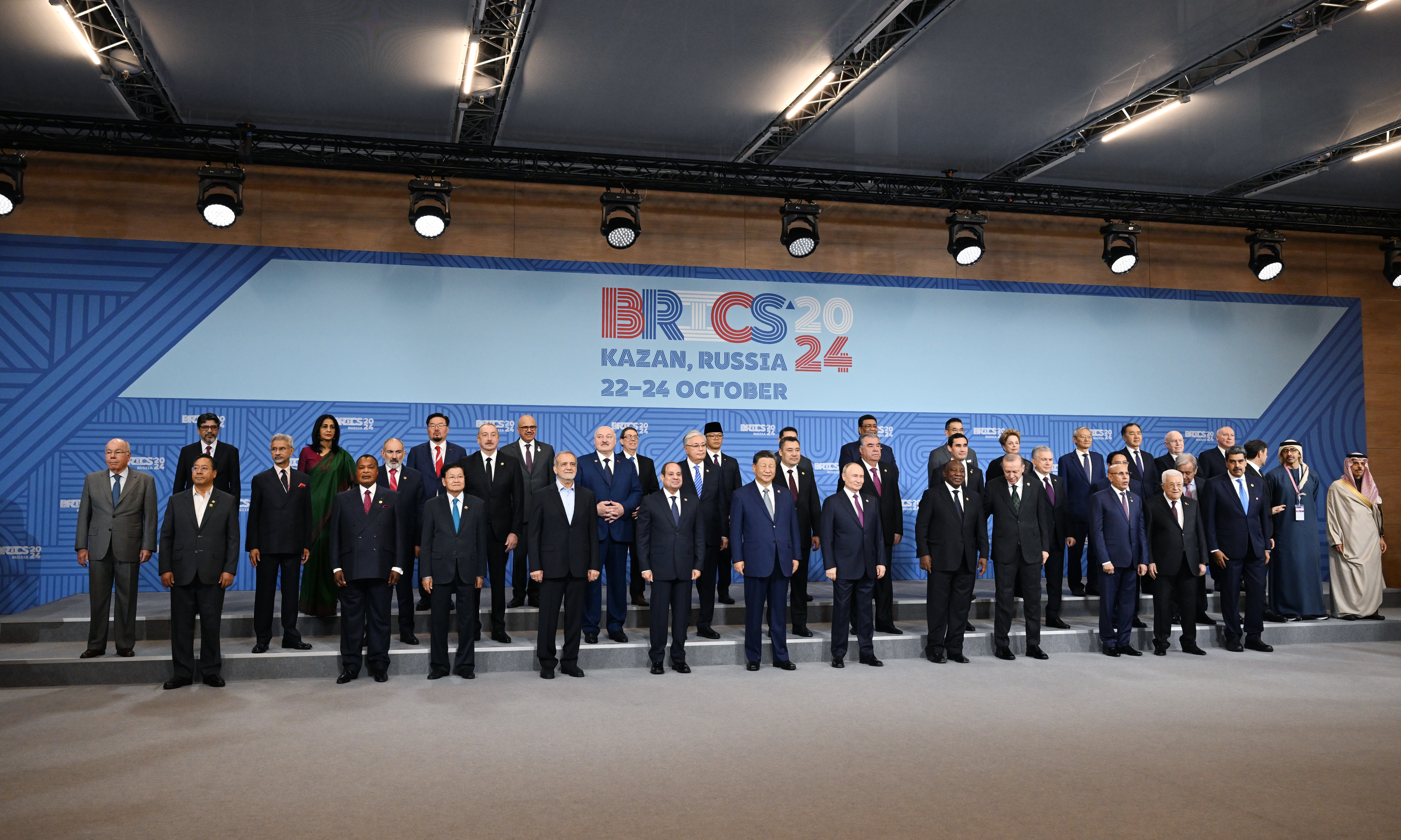
Vladimir Putin with foreign leaders in Kazan on 24 October 2024

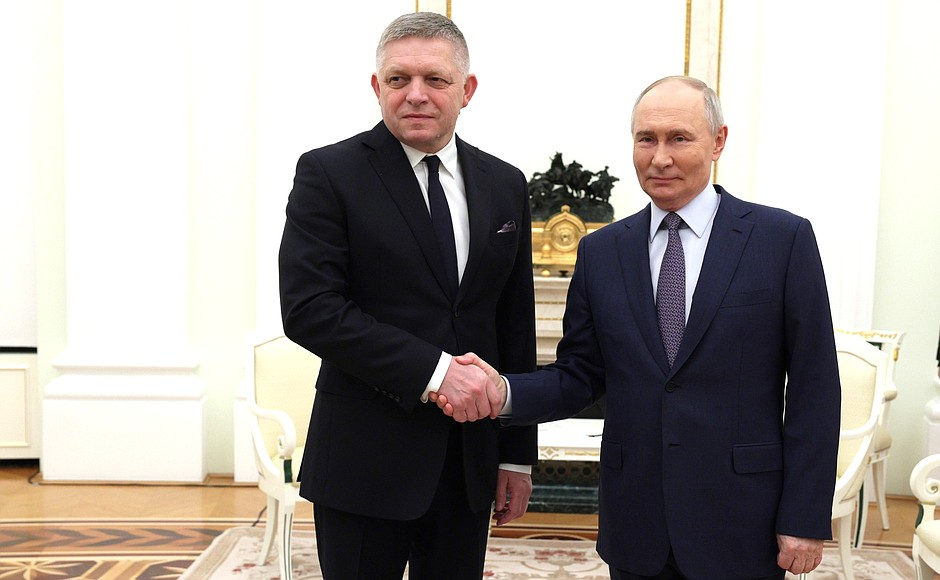
Slovak Prime Minister Robert Fico meeting Vladimir Putin in Moscow, 22 December 2024

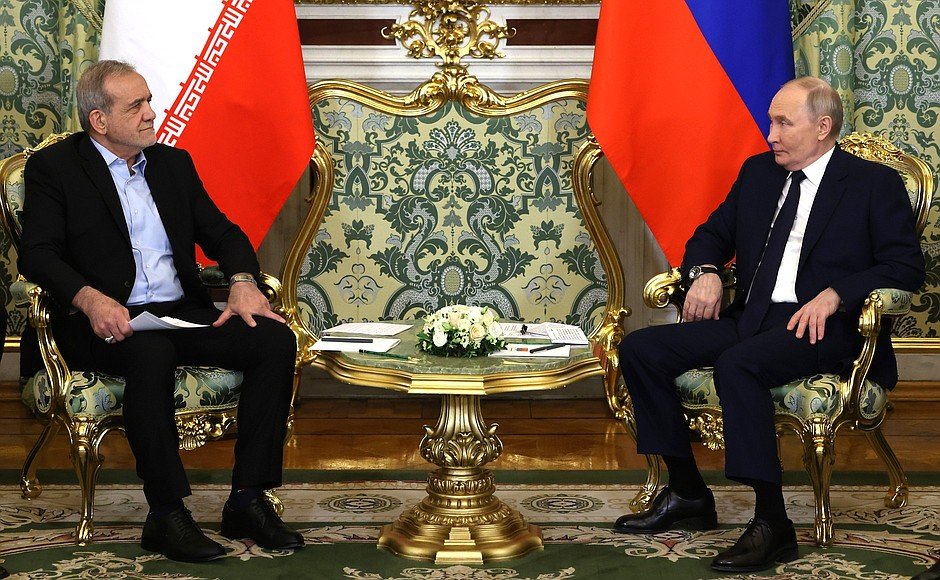
Iranian President Masoud Pezeshkian meeting with Vladimir Putin in Moscow, 17 January 2025

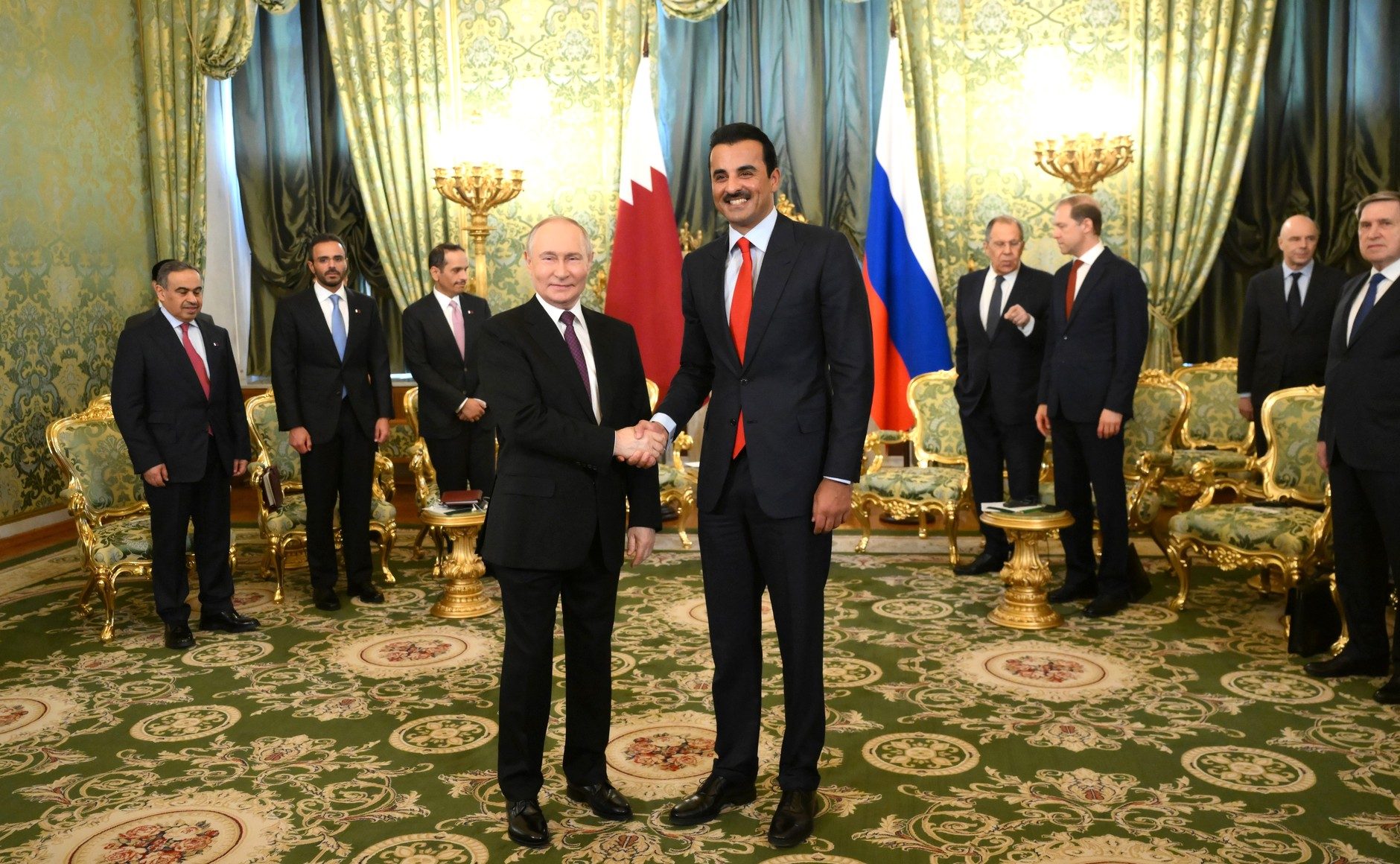
Emir of Qatar Tamim bin Hamad Al Thani meeting with Vladimir Putin in Moscow, 17 April 2025

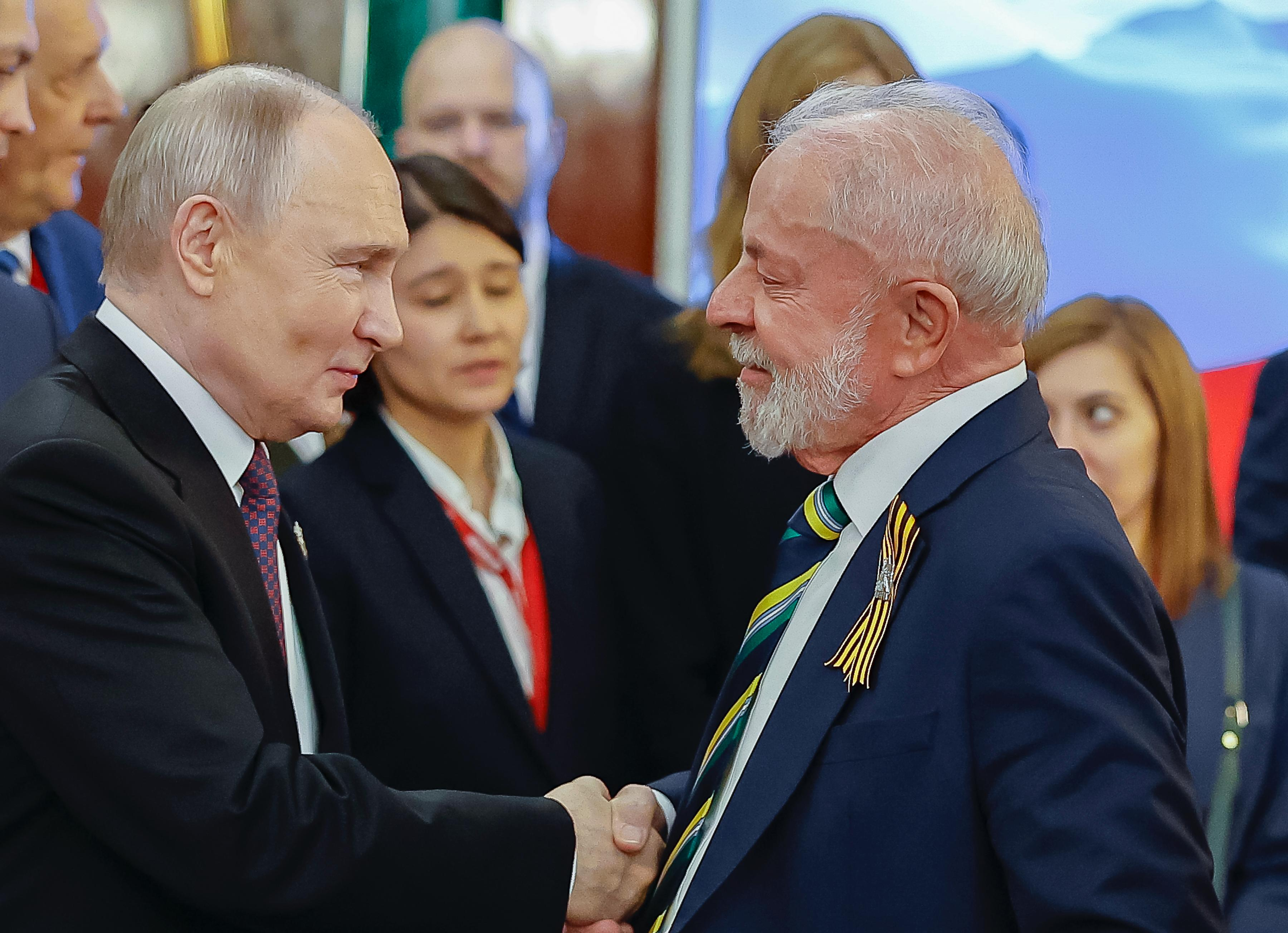
Brazilian President Luiz Inácio Lula da Silva with Vladimir Putin in Moscow, 7 May 2025

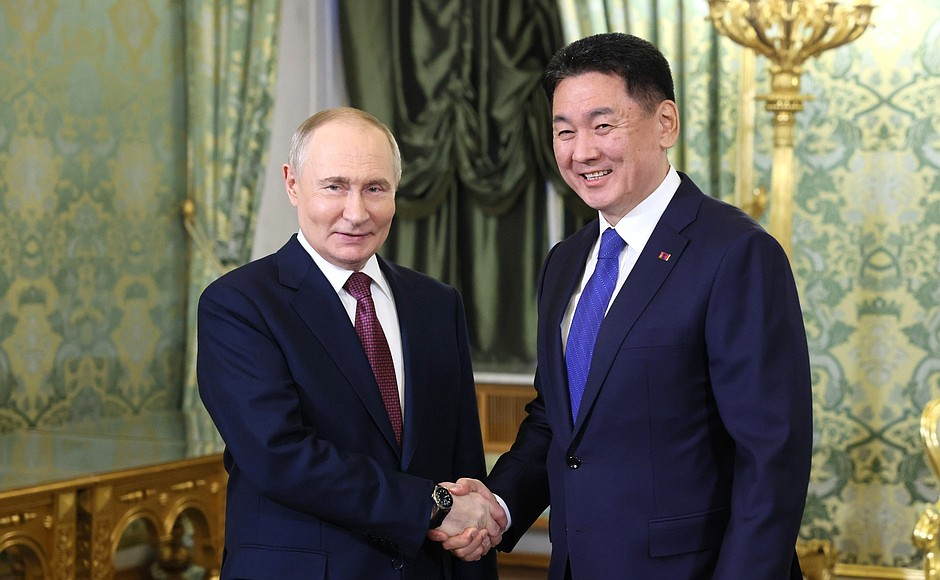
Mongolian President Ukhnaagiin Khürelsükh with Vladimir Putin in Moscow, 7 May 2025

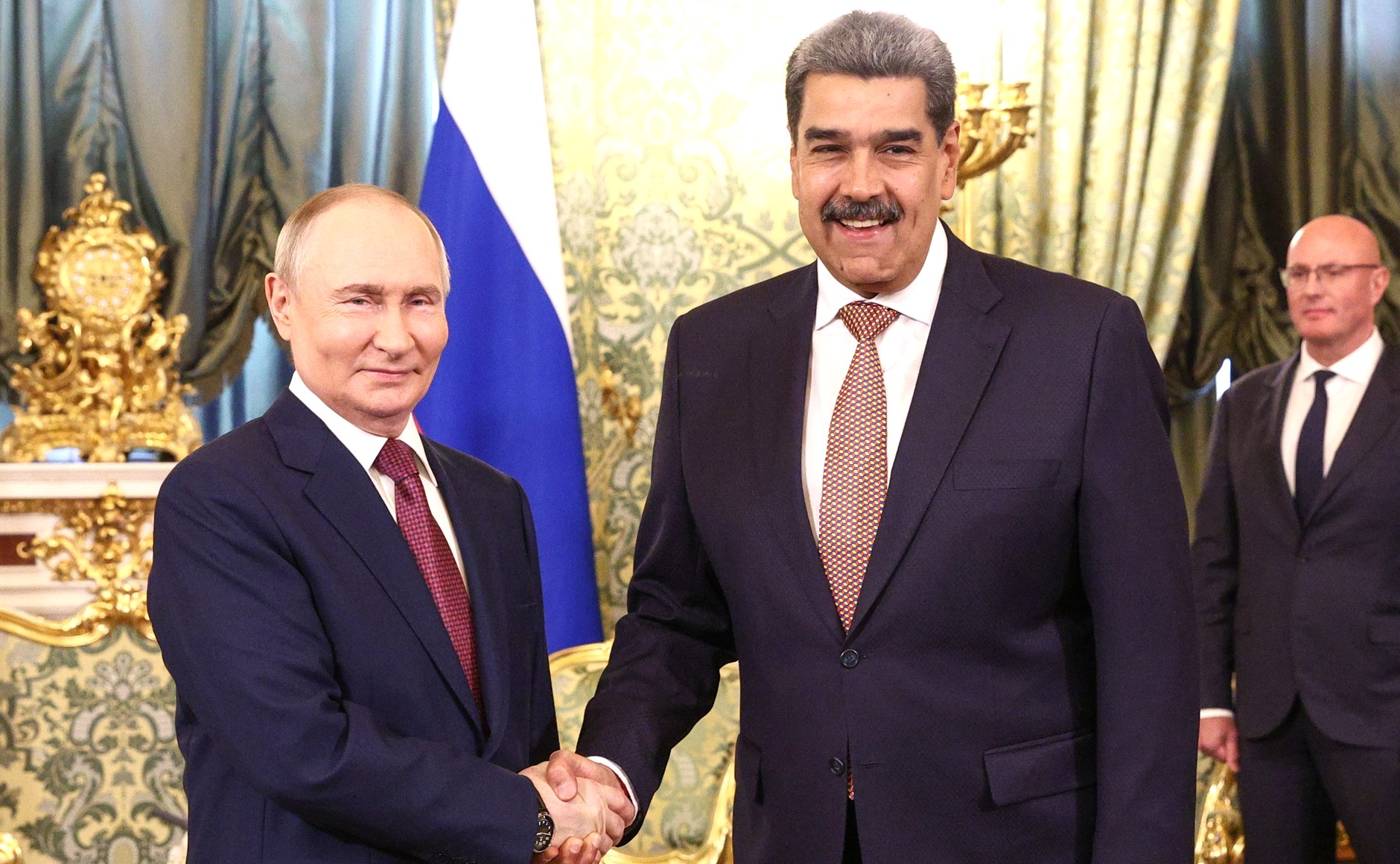
Venezuelan President Nicolás Maduro with Vladimir Putin in Moscow, 7 May 2025

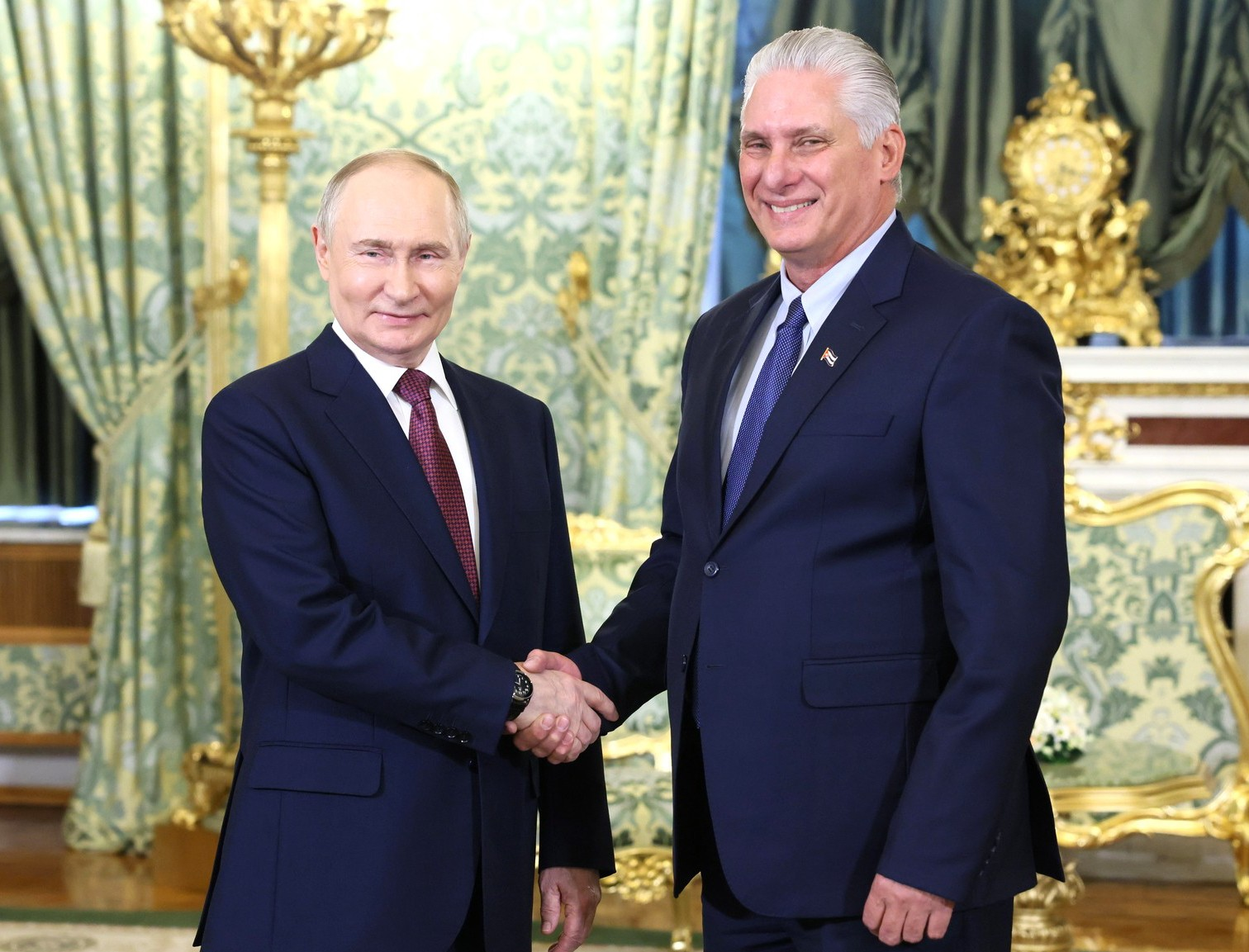
Cuban leader Miguel Díaz-Canel with Vladimir Putin in Moscow, 8 May 2025

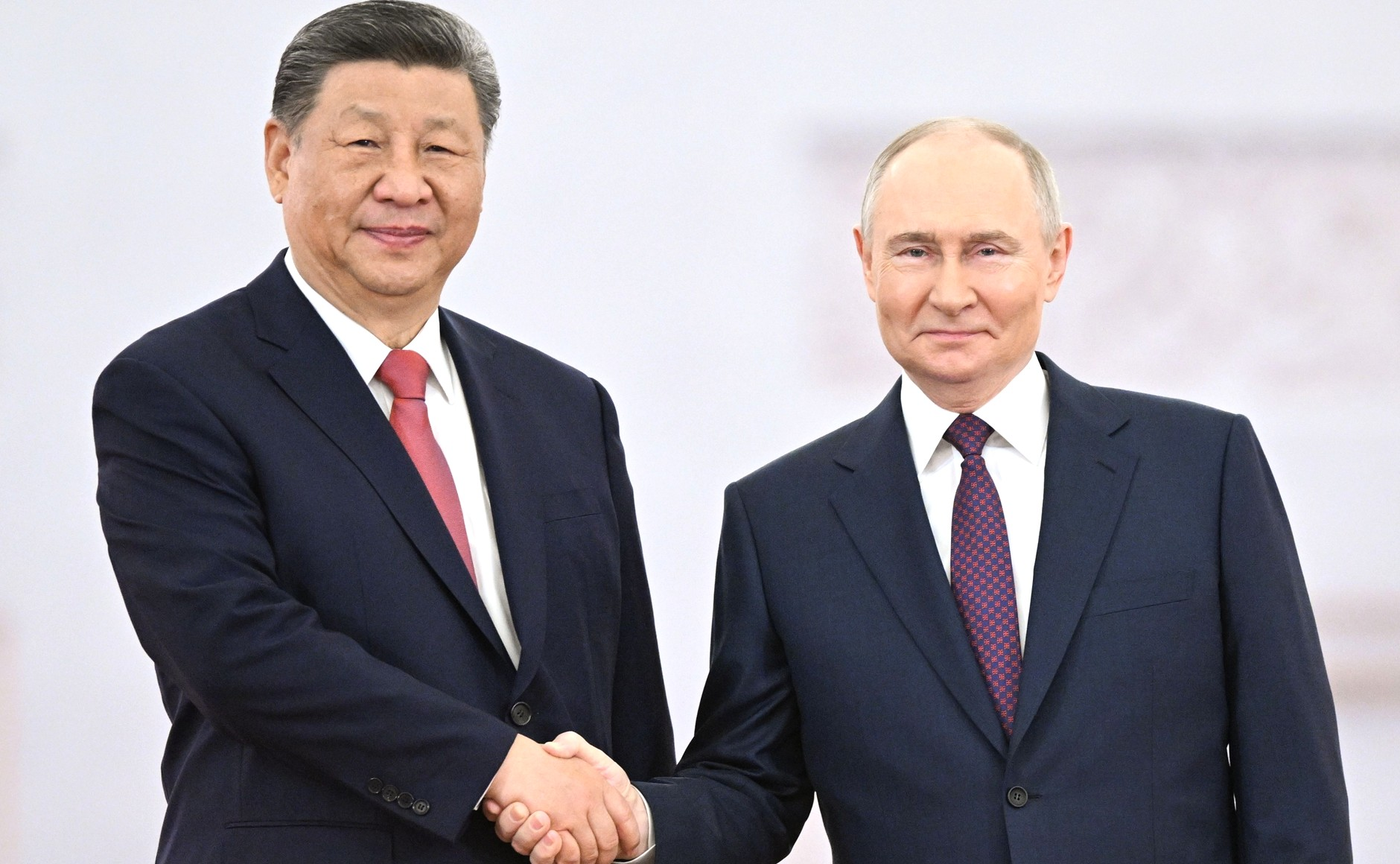
Vladimir Putin meeting with Chinese leader Xi Jinping on 8 May 2025

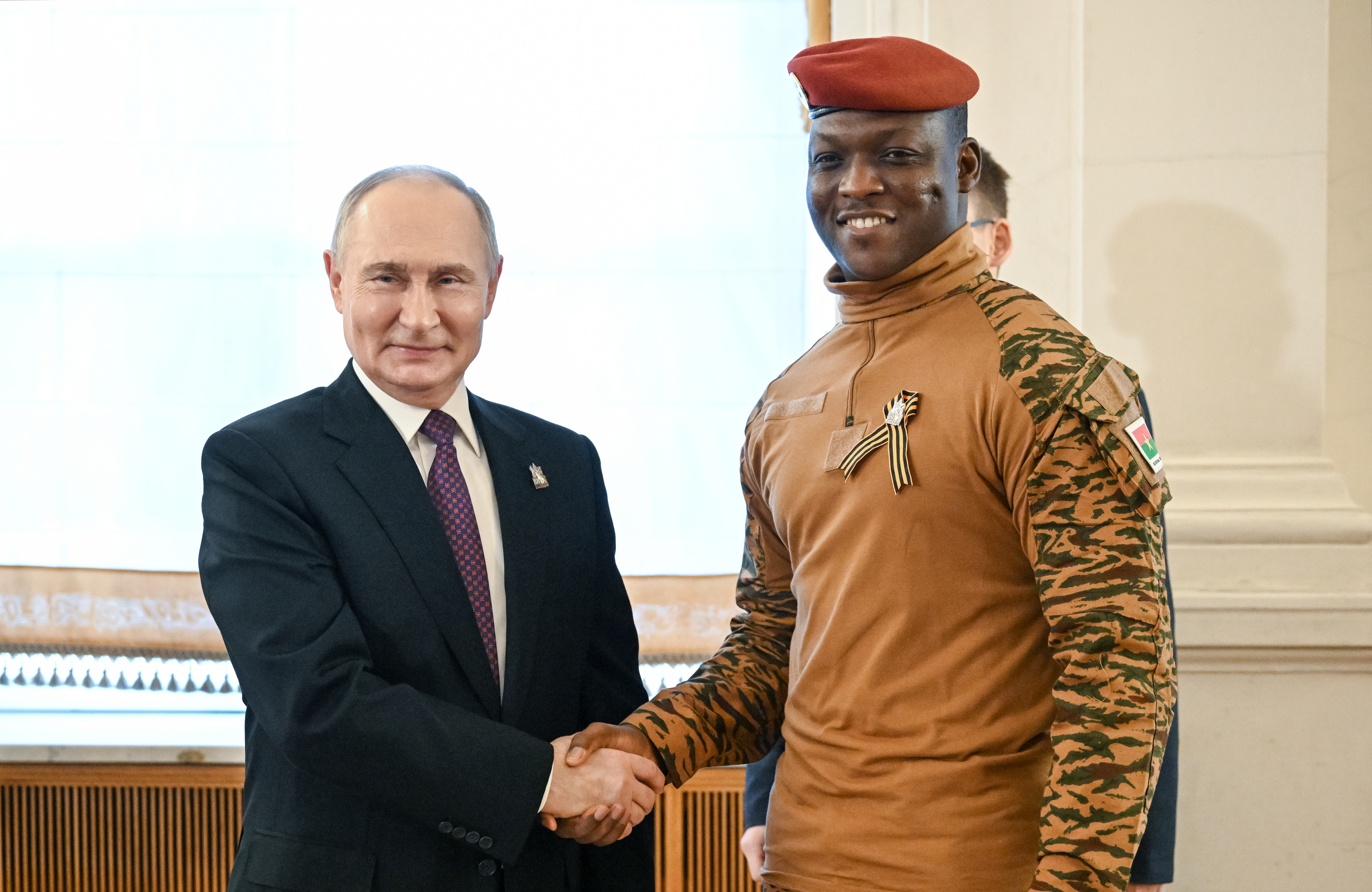
Burkinabé President Ibrahim Traoré with Vladimir Putin in Moscow, 8 May 2025

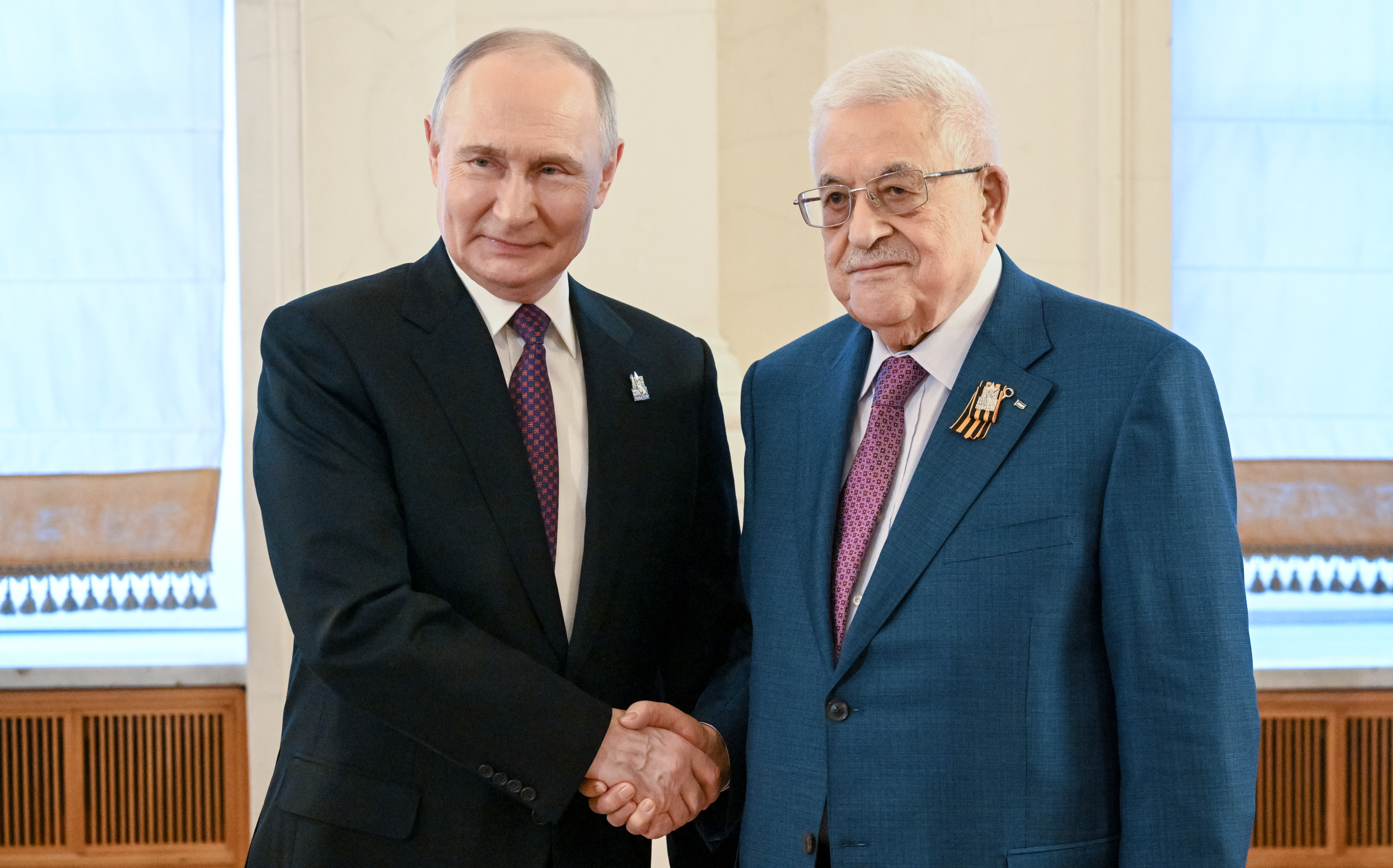
Palestinian President Mahmoud Abbas with Vladimir Putin in Moscow, 8 May 2025

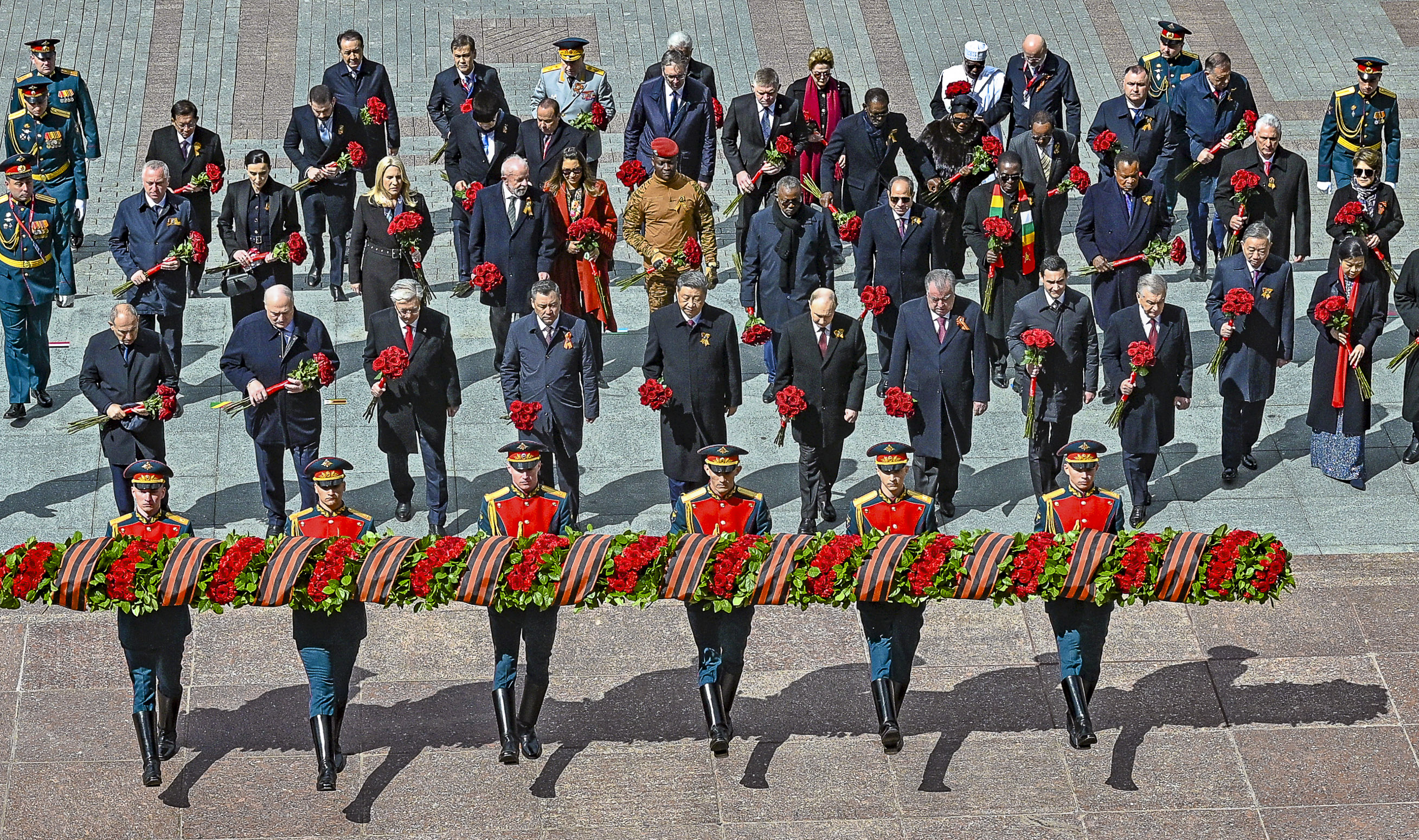
Vladimir Putin with foreign leaders in Moscow on 9 May 2025

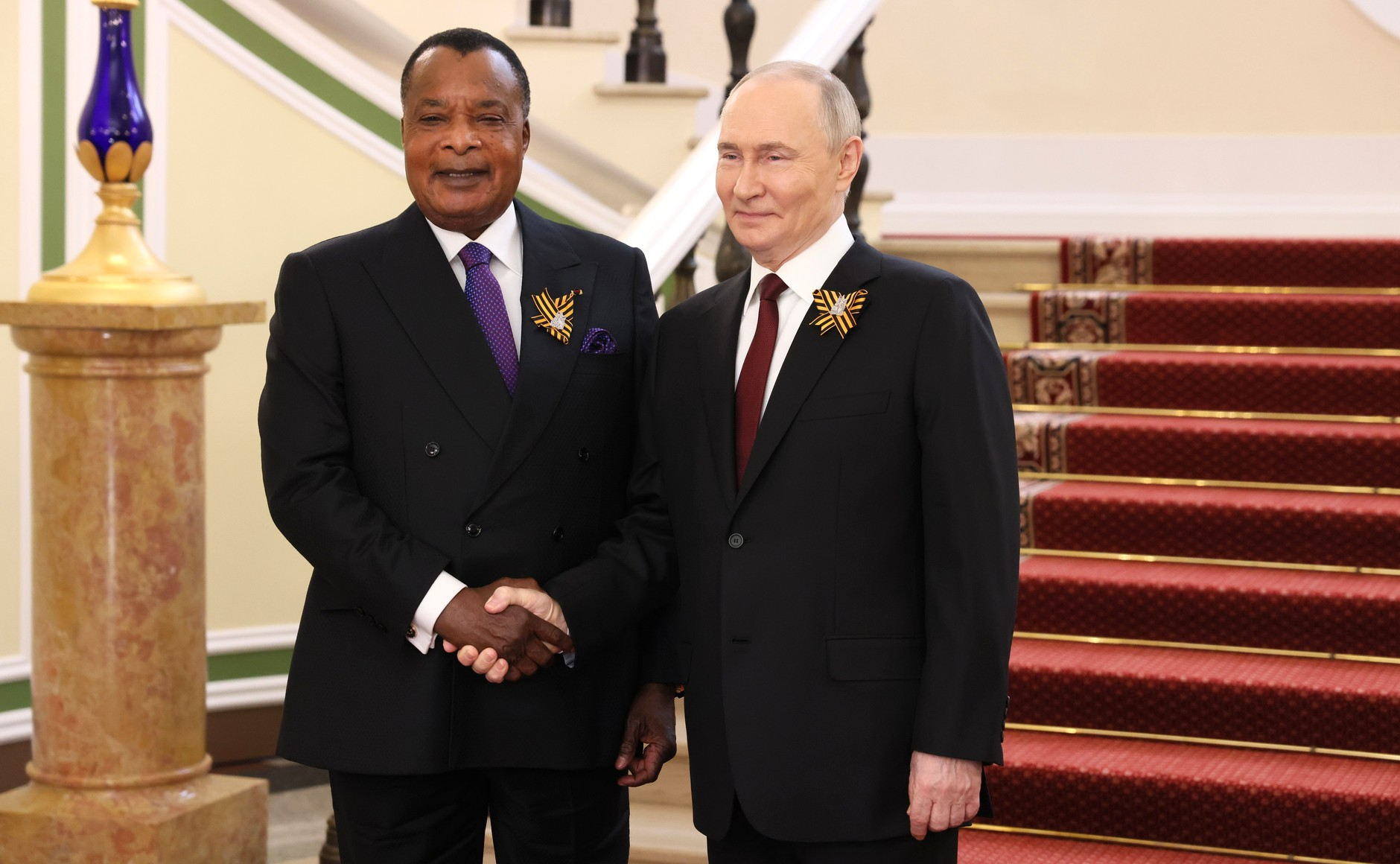
Vladimir Putin with Congolese President Denis Sassou Nguesso in Moscow on 9 May 2025

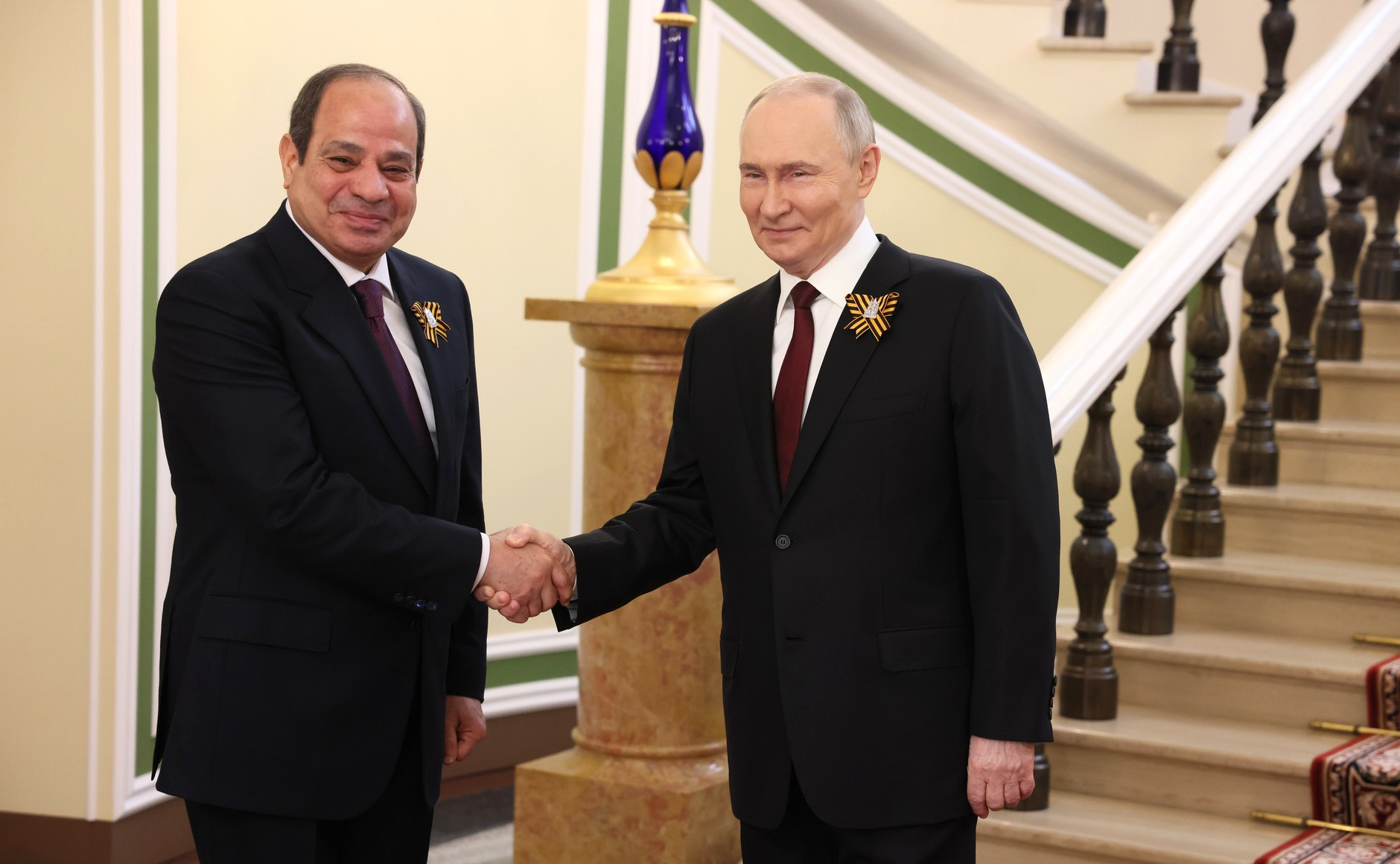
Vladimir Putin with Egyptian President Abdel Fattah el-Sisi in Moscow on 9 May 2025

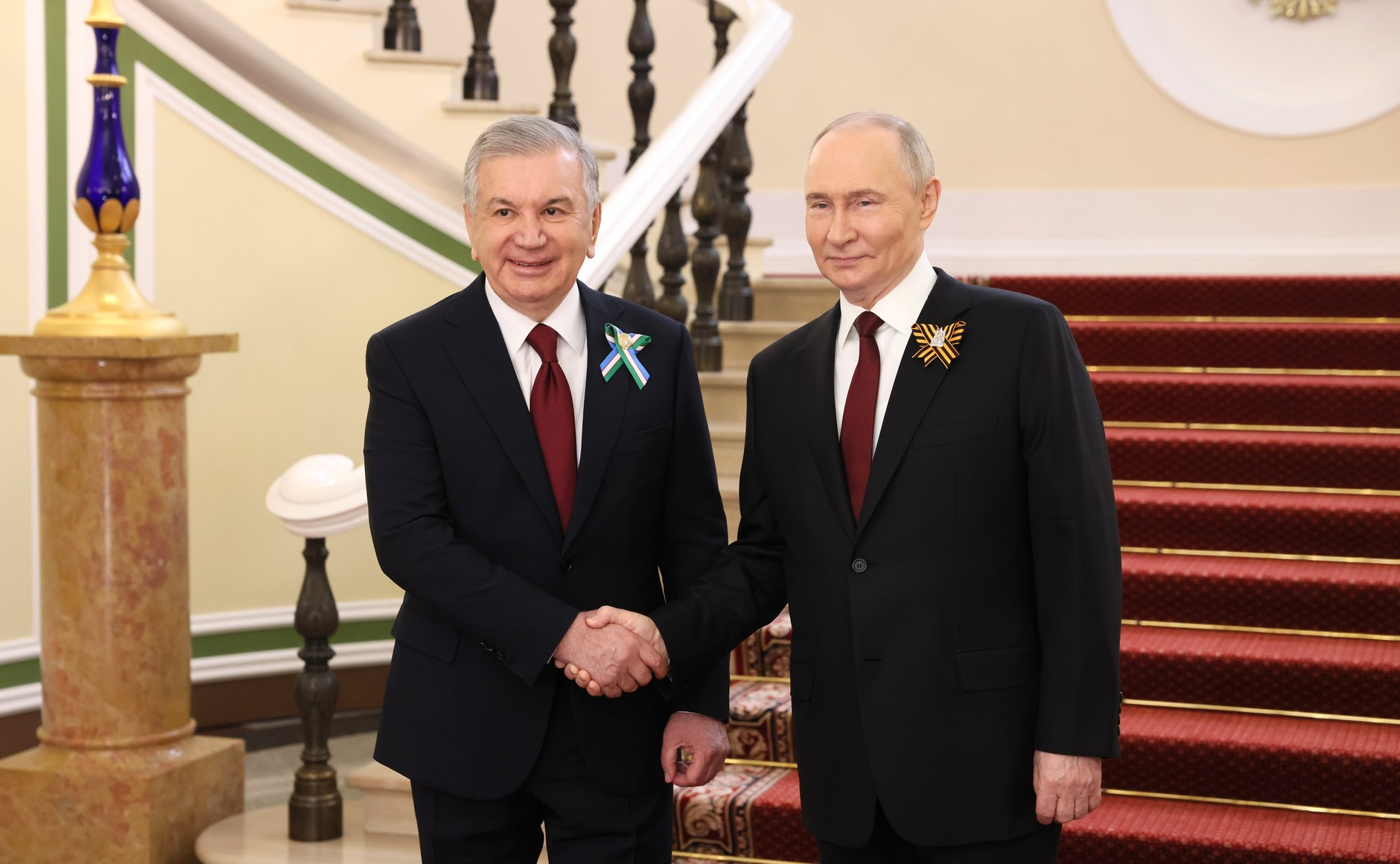
Vladimir Putin with Uzbek President Shavkat Mirziyoyev in Moscow on 9 May 2025

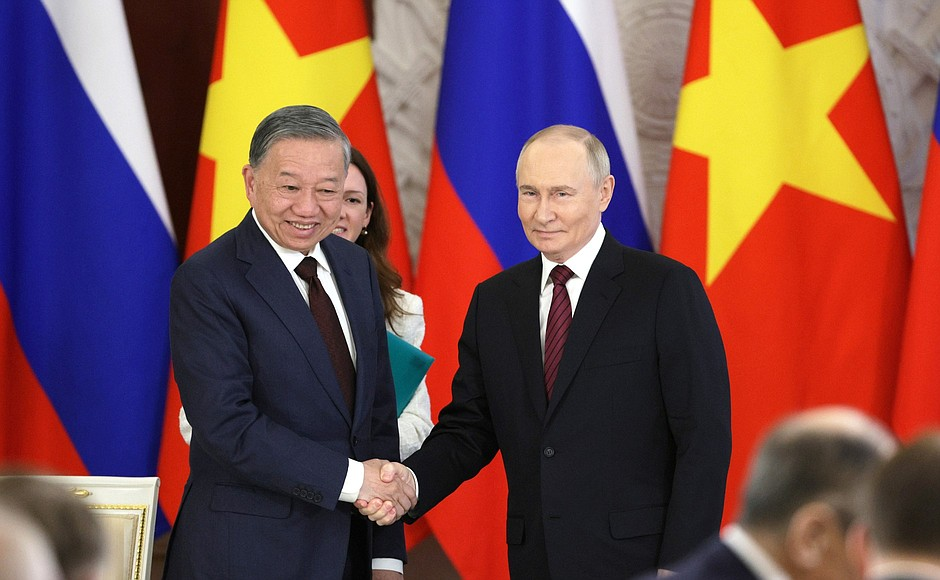
Vladimir Putin meeting with General Secretary of the Communist Party of Vietnam Tô Lâm in Moscow, 10 May 2025

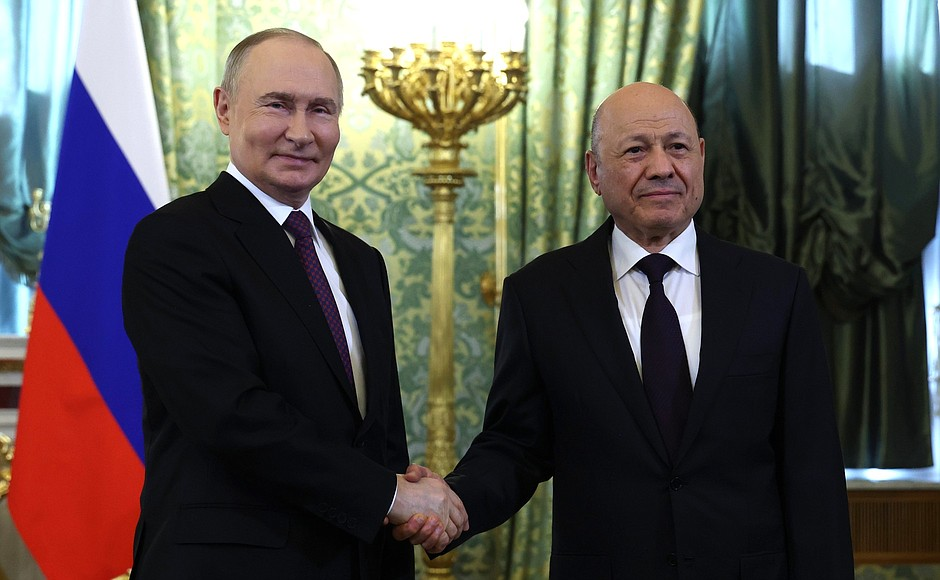
Vladimir Putin meeting with Yemeni President Rashad al-Alimi in Moscow, 28 May 2025

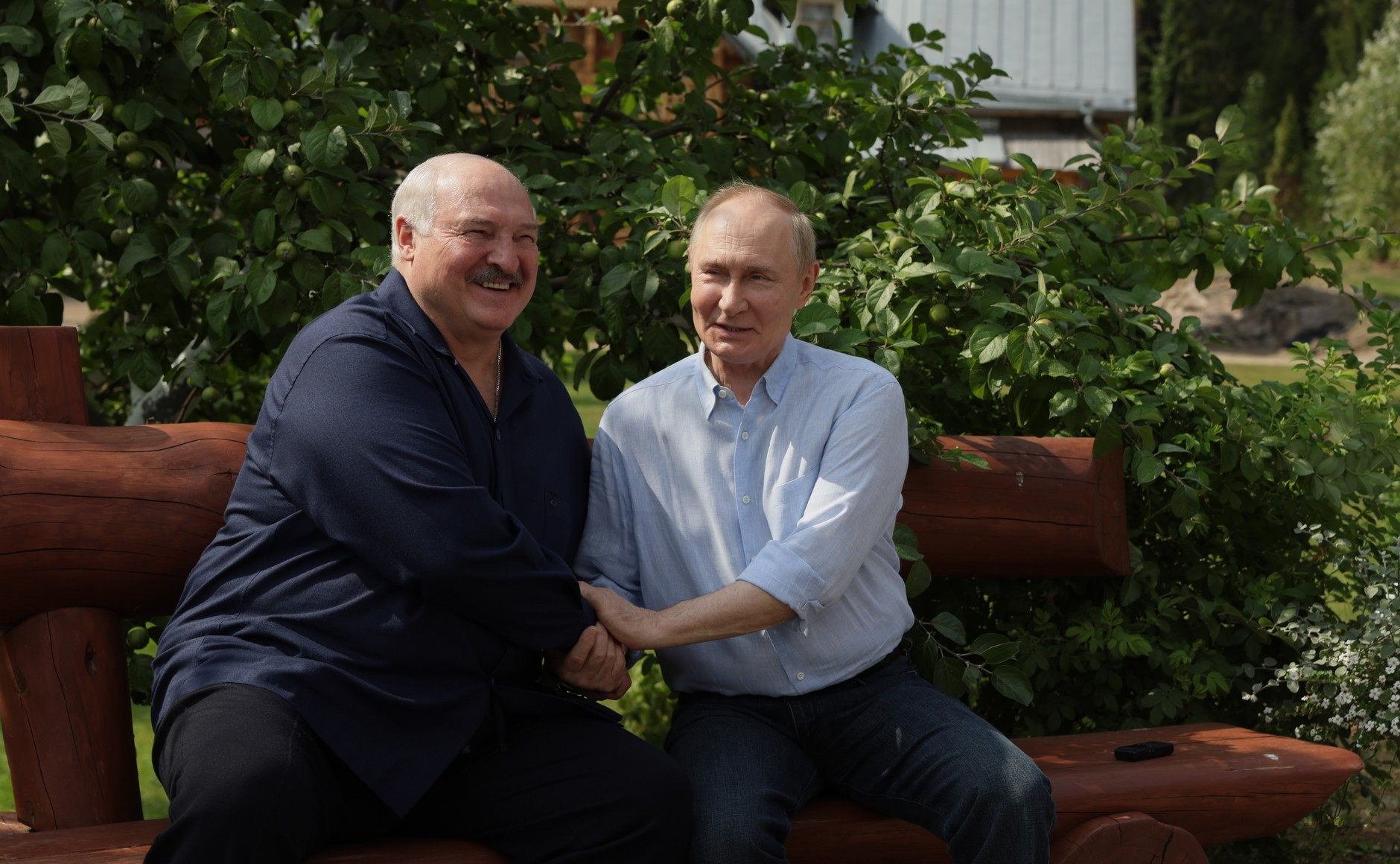
Vladimir Putin meeting with Belarusian President Alexander Lukashenko at the Valaam Monastery, 1 August 2025

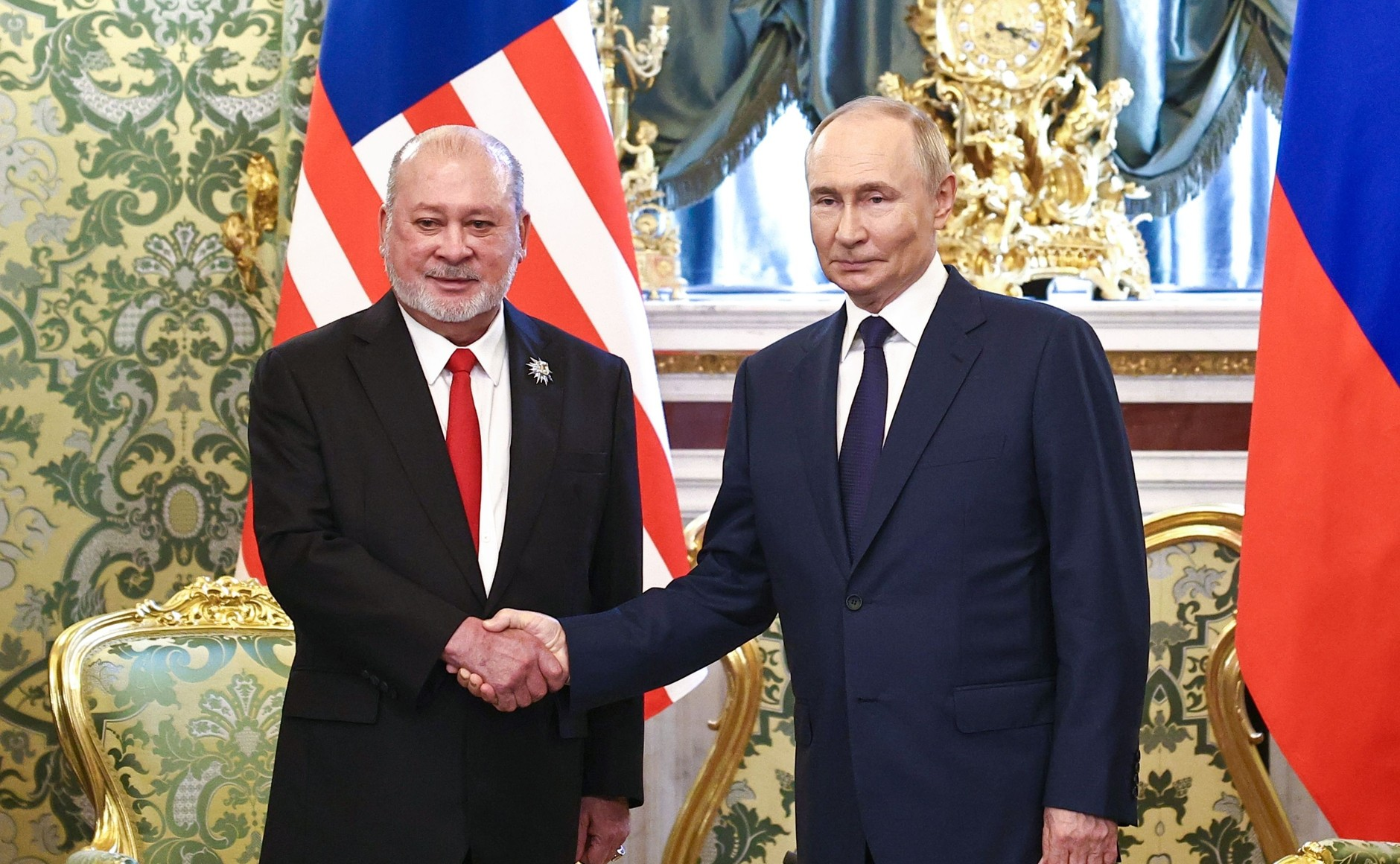
Vladimir Putin meeting with King of Malaysia Ibrahim ibni Iskandar in Moscow, 6 August 2025

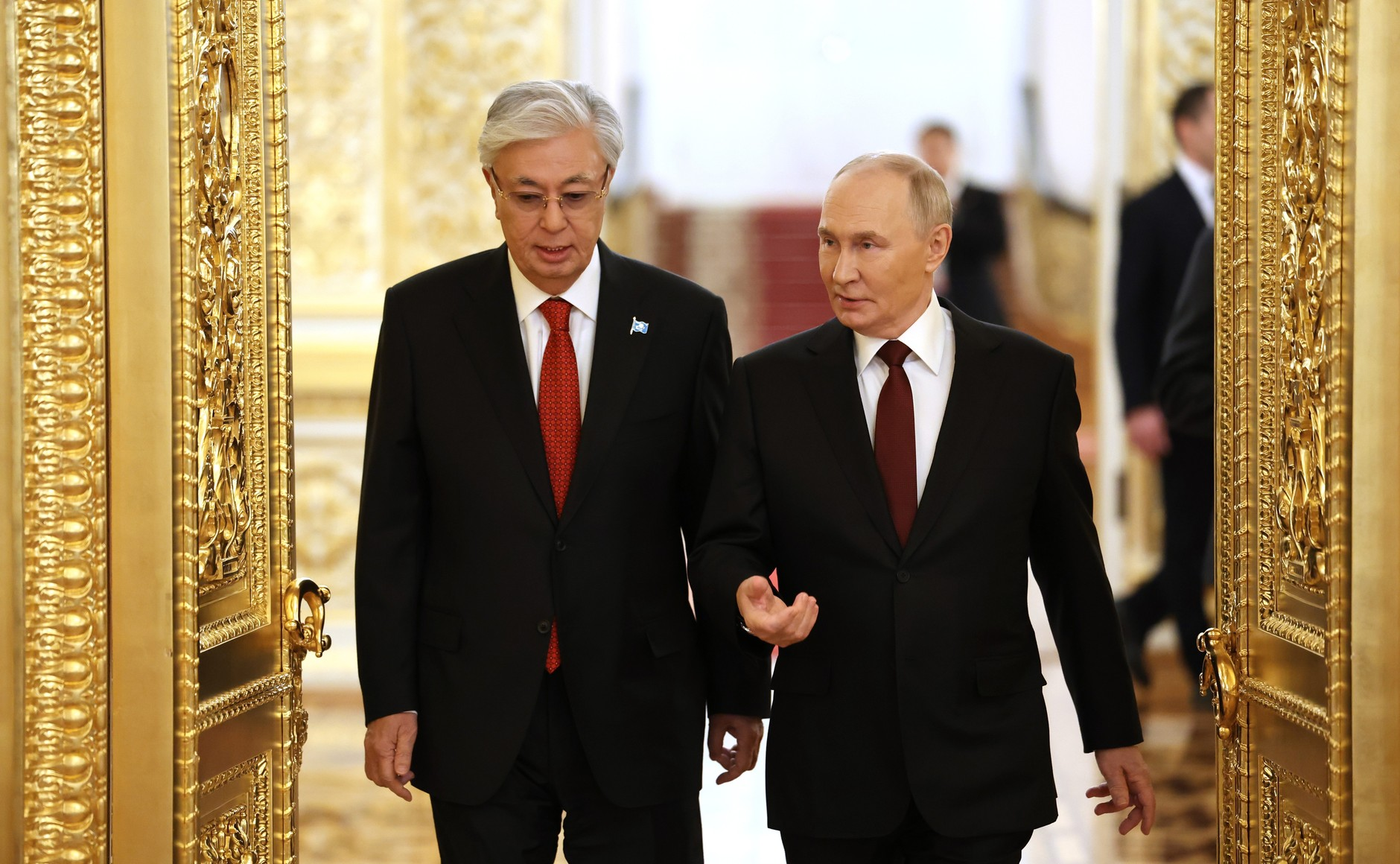
Vladimir Putin meeting with Kazakh President Kassym-Jomart Tokayev in Moscow, 12 November 2025

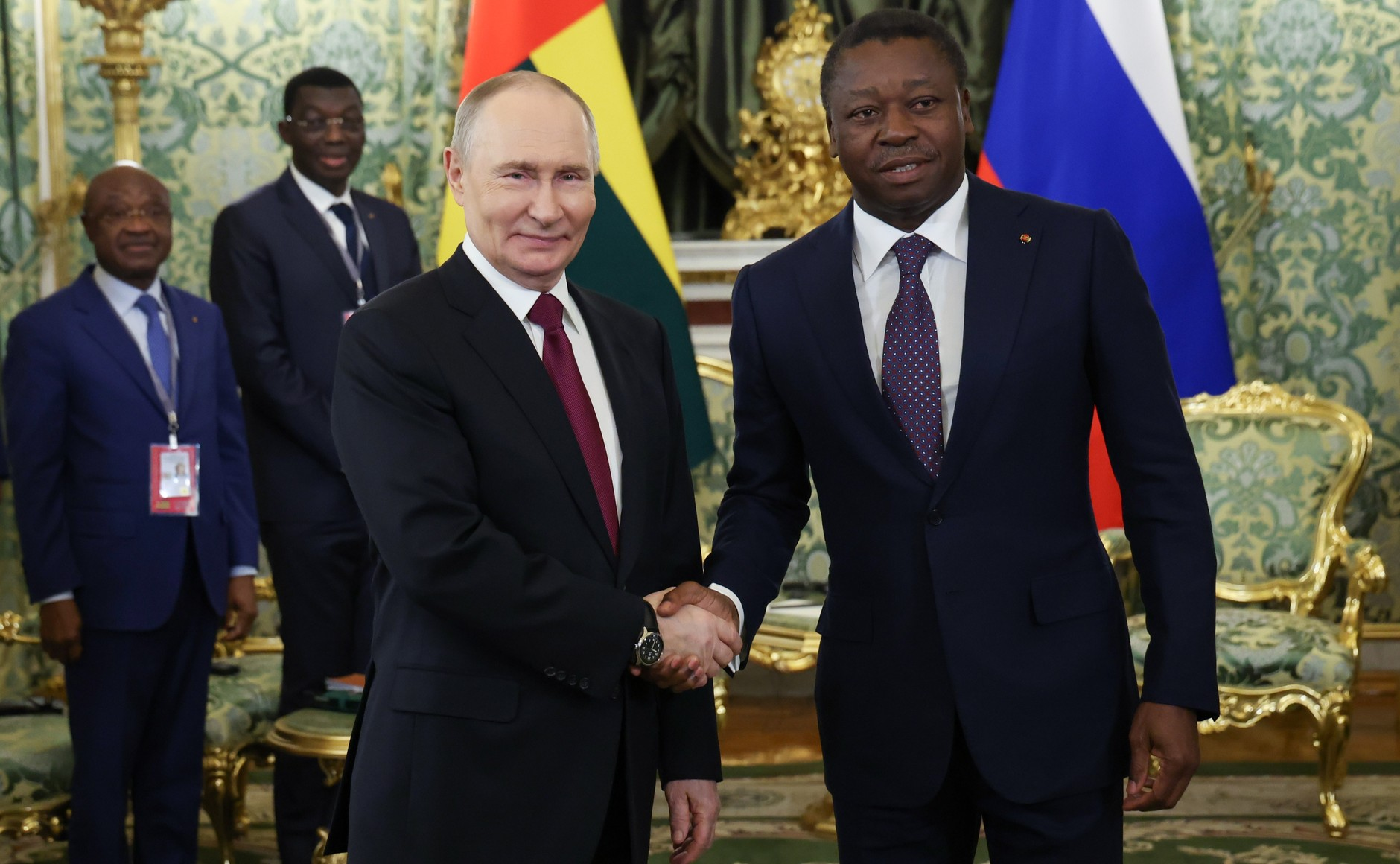
Vladimir Putin meeting with Togolese Prime Minister Faure Gnassingbé in Moscow, 19 November 2025

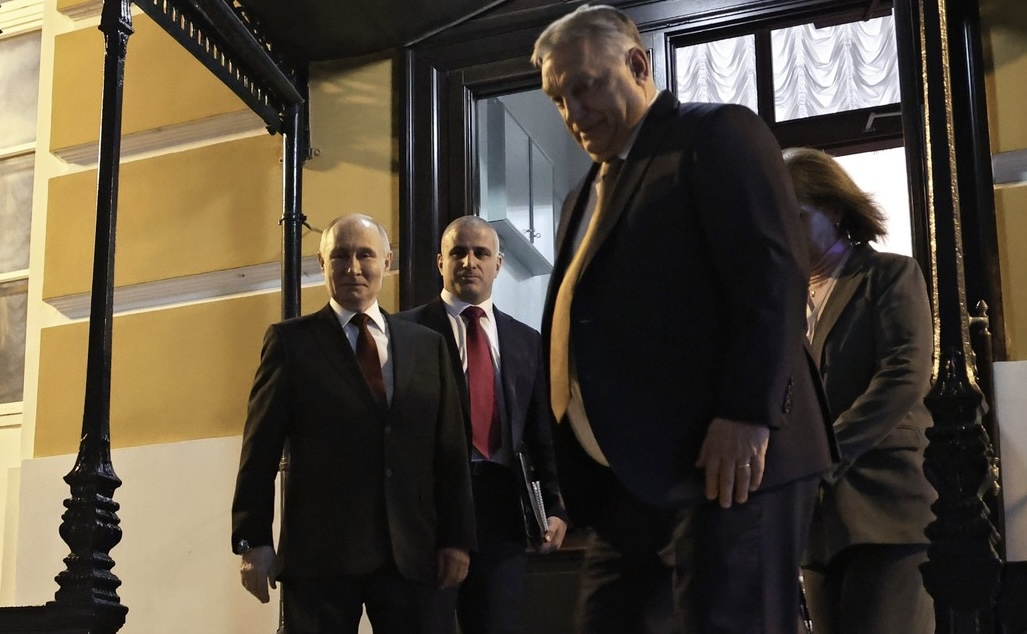
Hungarian Prime Minister Viktor Orbán with Vladimir Putin in Moscow, 28 November 2025

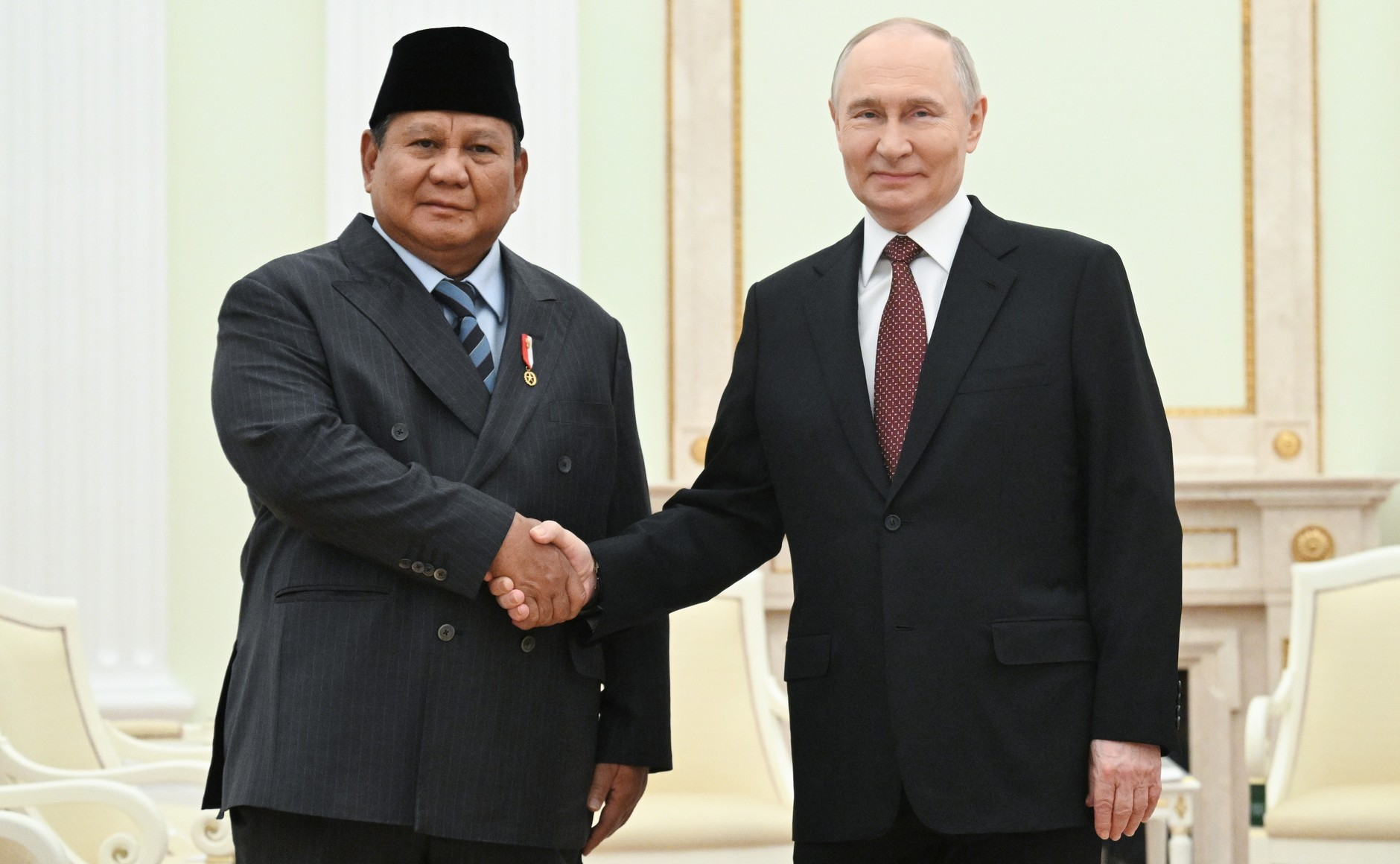
Indonesian President Prabowo Subianto with Vladimir Putin in Moscow, 10 December 2025

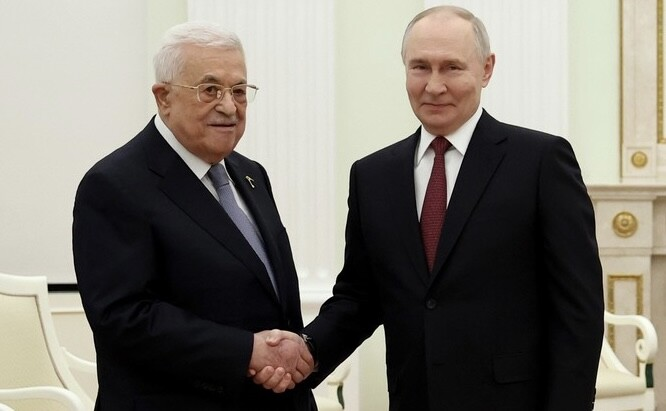
Palestinian President Mahmoud Abbas with Vladimir Putin in Moscow, 22 January 2026

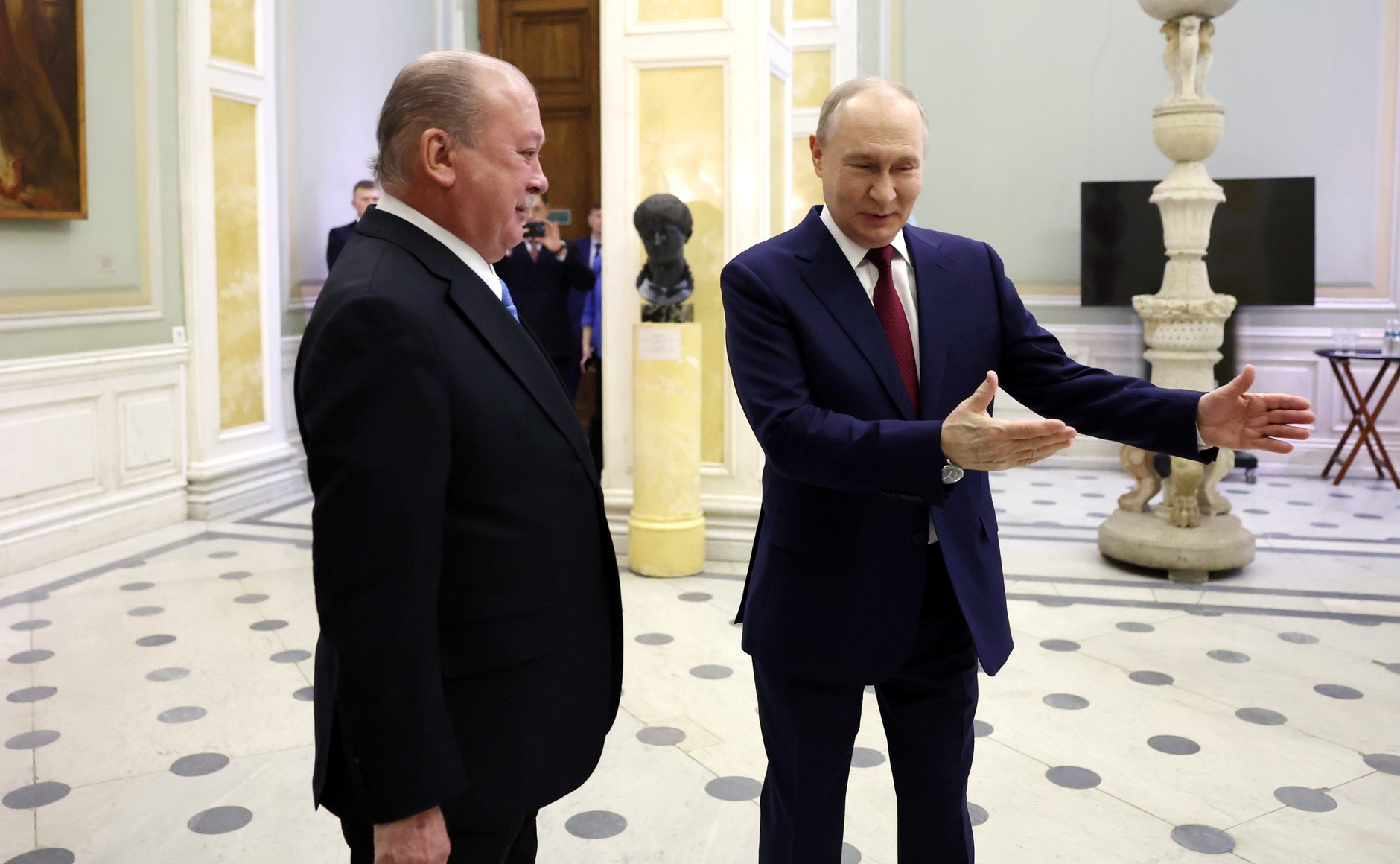
King of Malaysia Ibrahim ibni Iskandar with Vladimir Putin in St. Petersburg, 26 January 2026

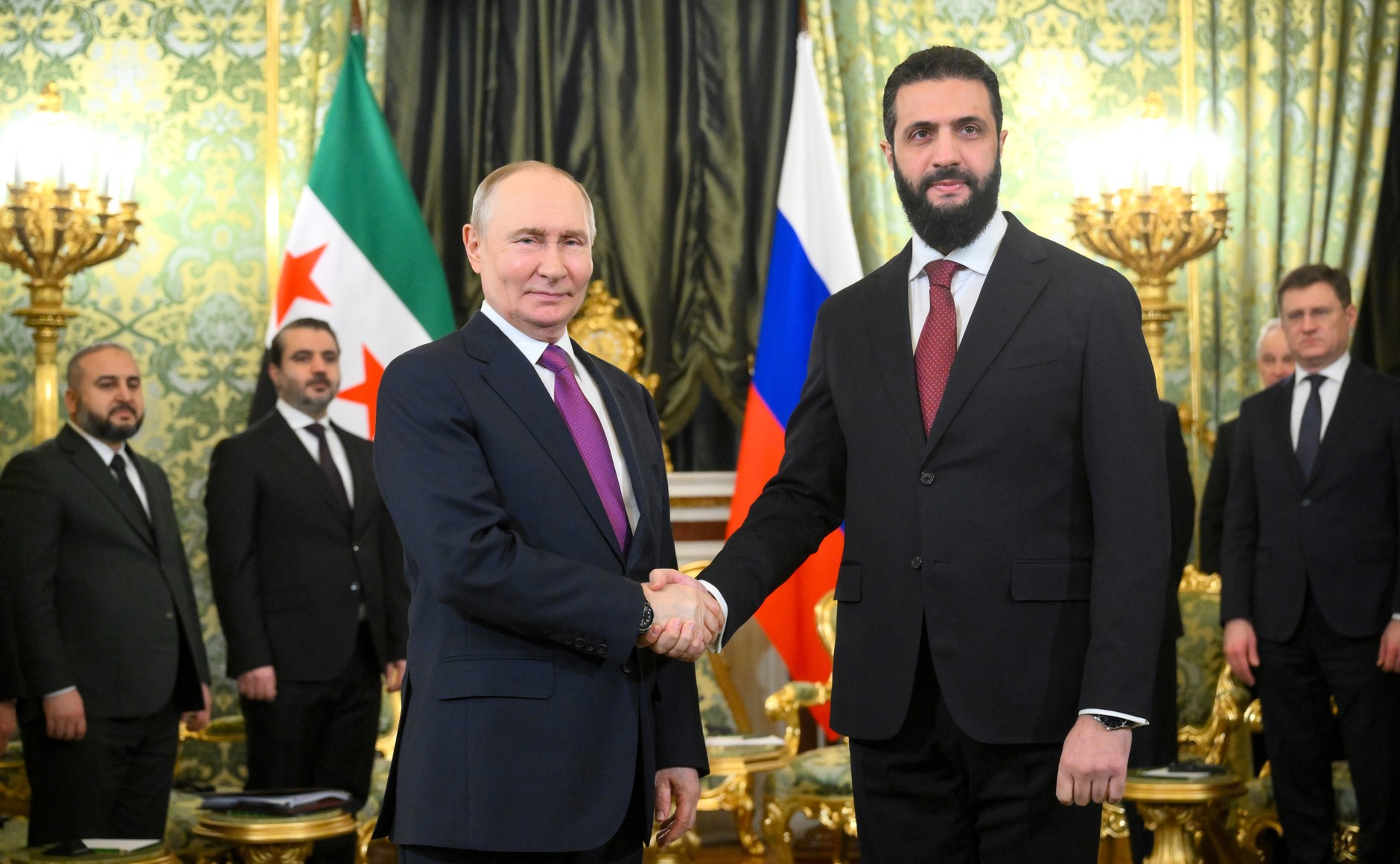
Syrian President Ahmed al-Sharaa with Vladimir Putin in Moscow, 28 January 2026

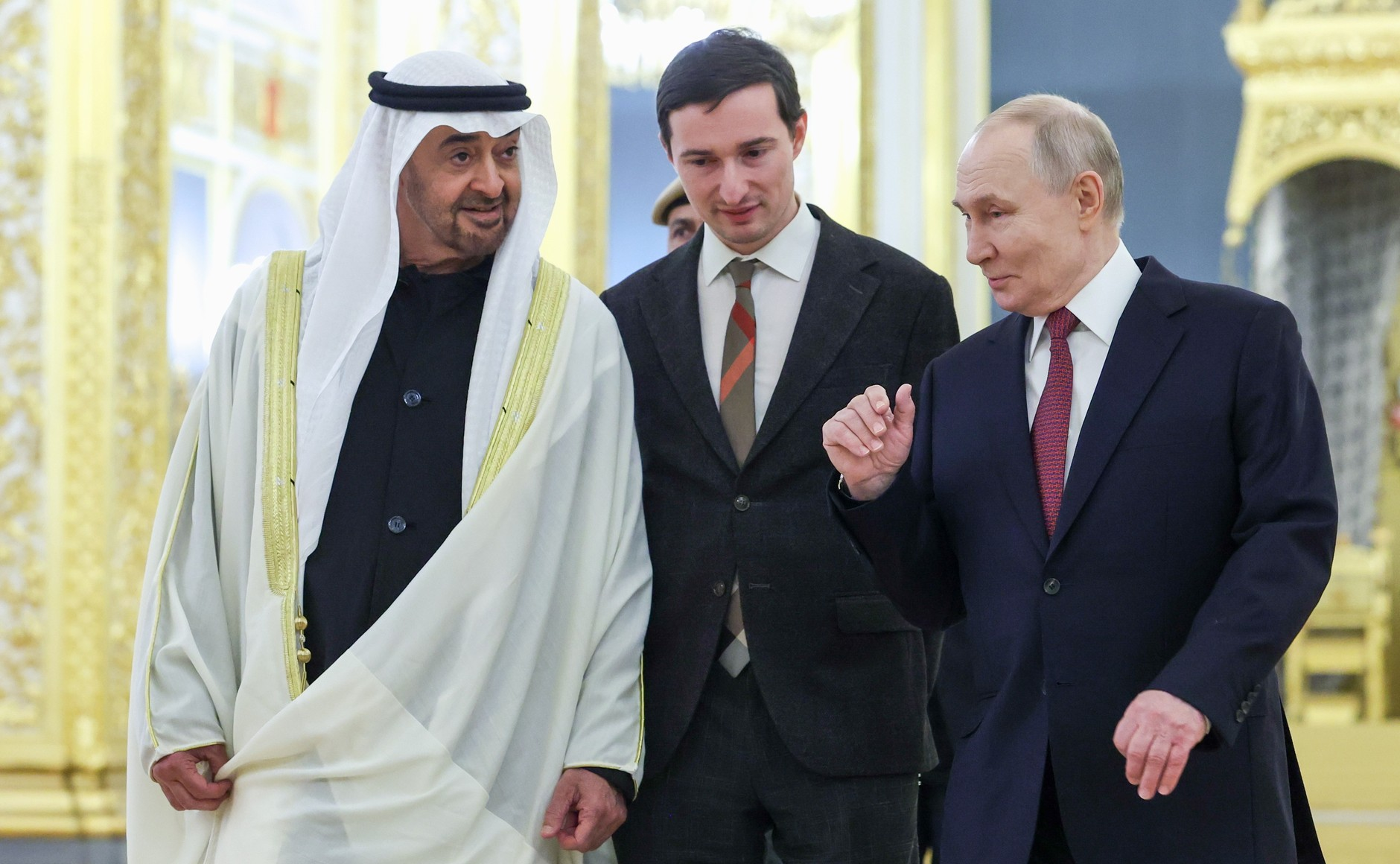
Emirati President Mohamed bin Zayed Al Nahyan with Vladimir Putin in Moscow, 29 January 2026

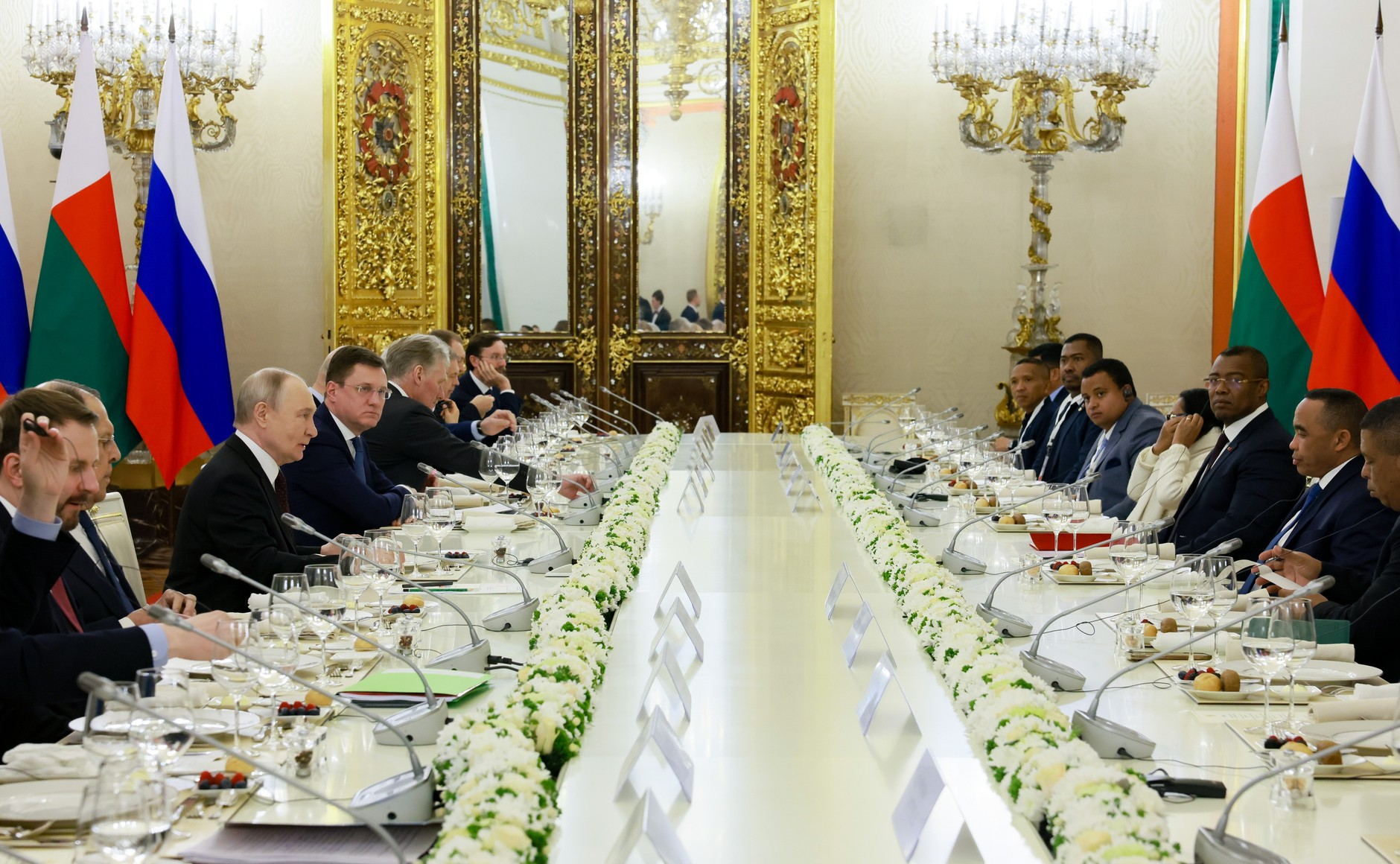
Vladimir Putin meeting with Malagasy President Michael Randrianirina, 19 February 2026

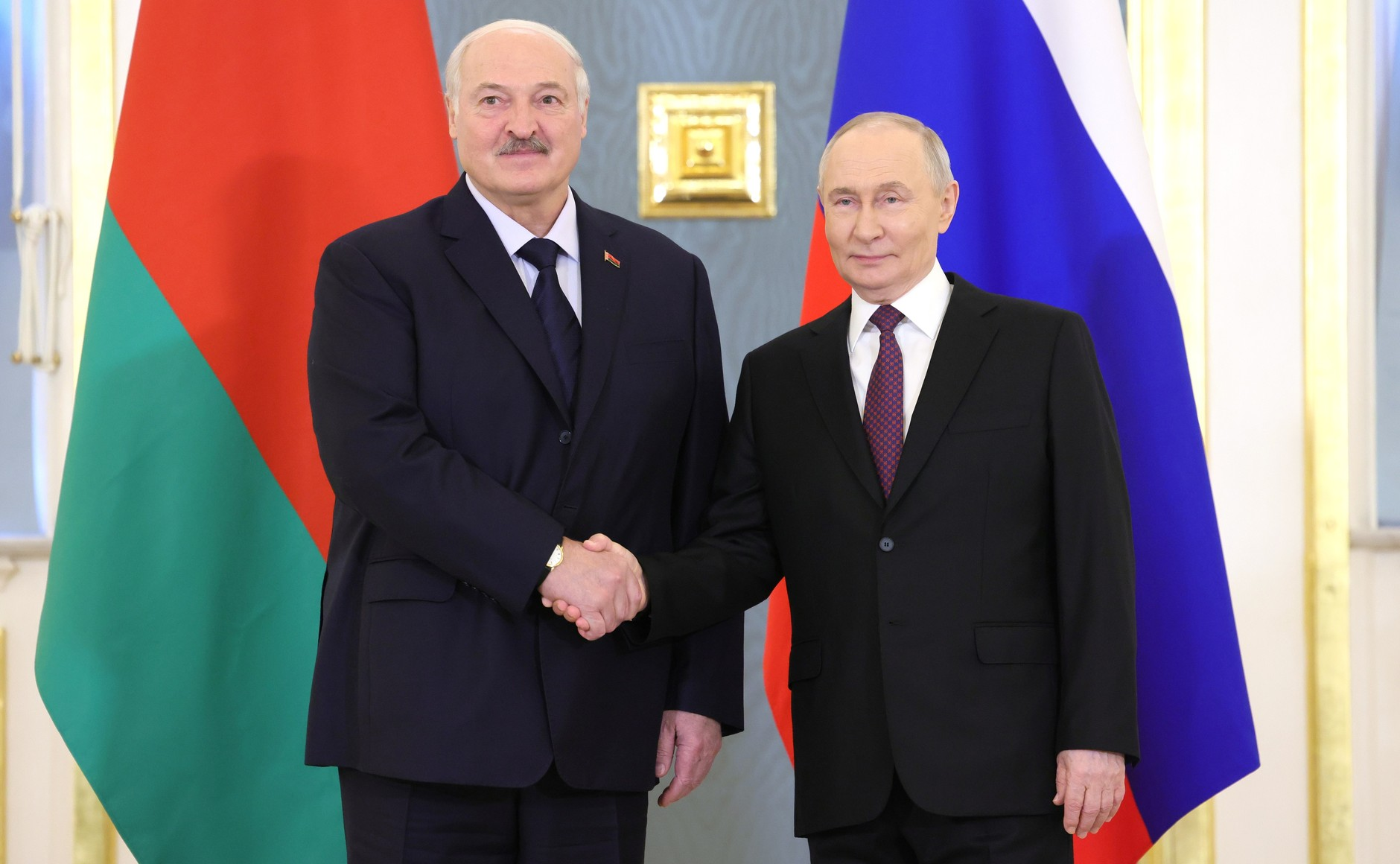
Vladimir Putin and Belarusian President Alexander Lukashenko, 26 February 2026

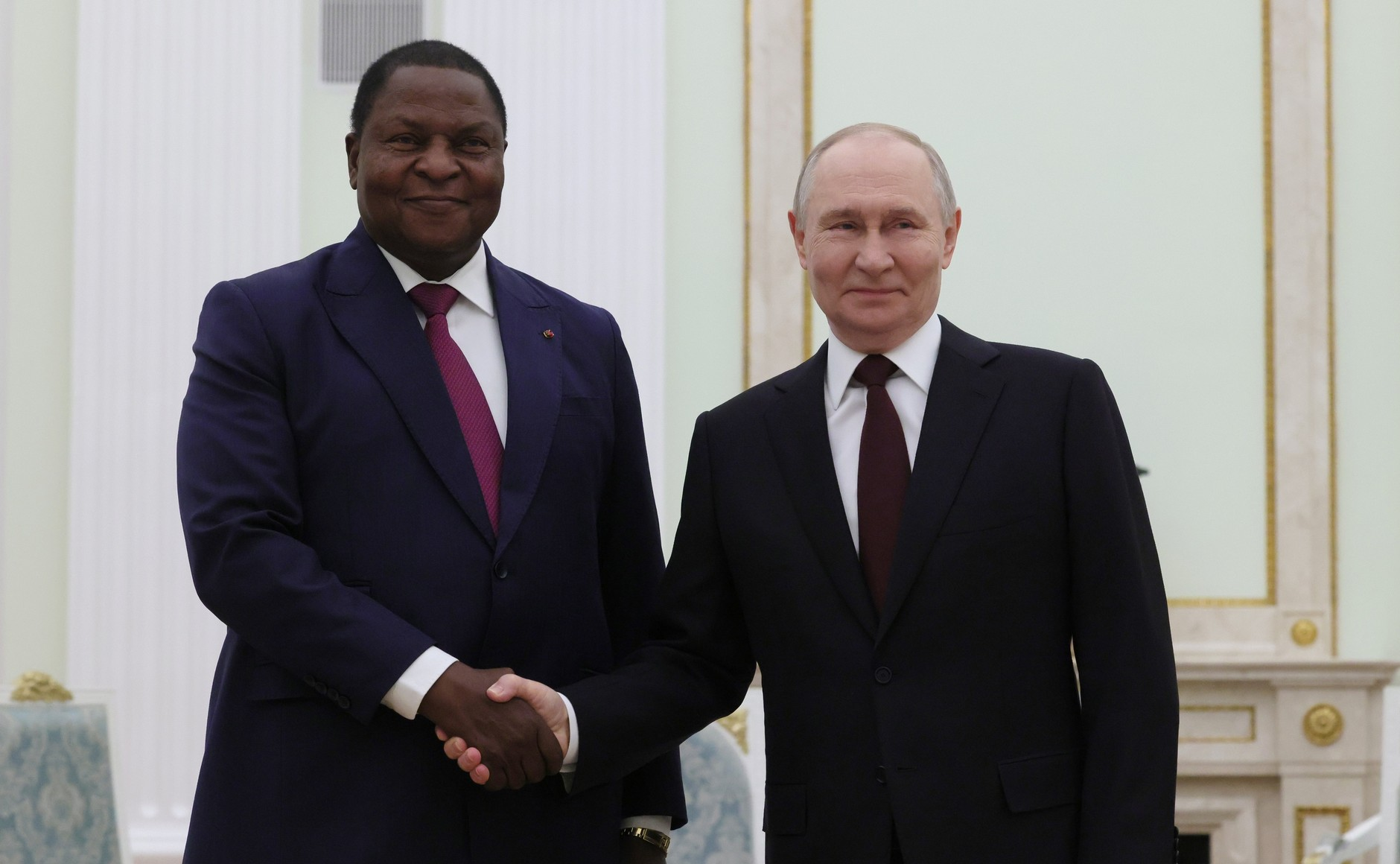
Vladimir Putin and Central African President Faustin-Archange Touadéra, 5 March 2026

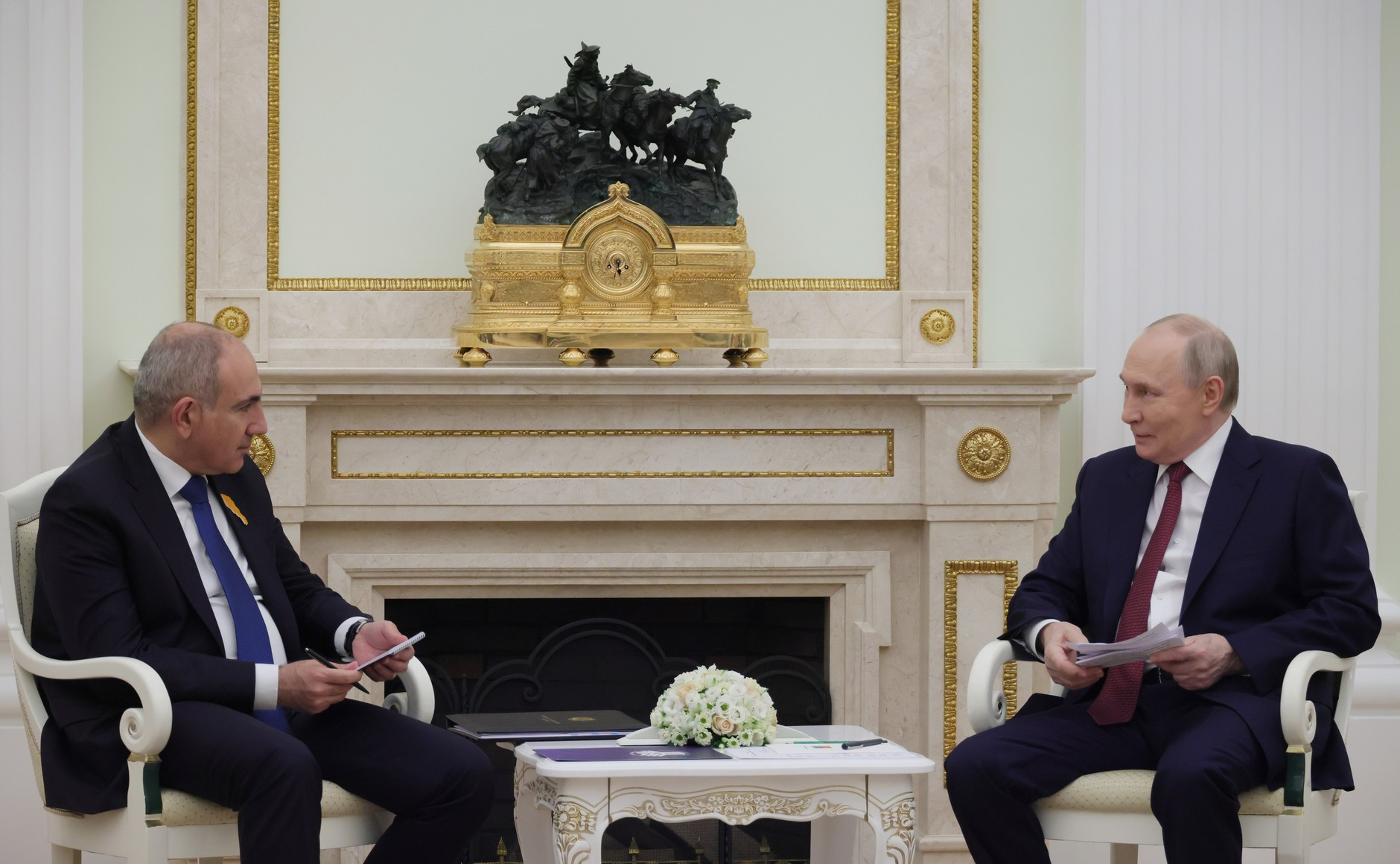
Vladimir Putin and Armenian Prime Minister Nikol Pashinyan, 1 April 2026

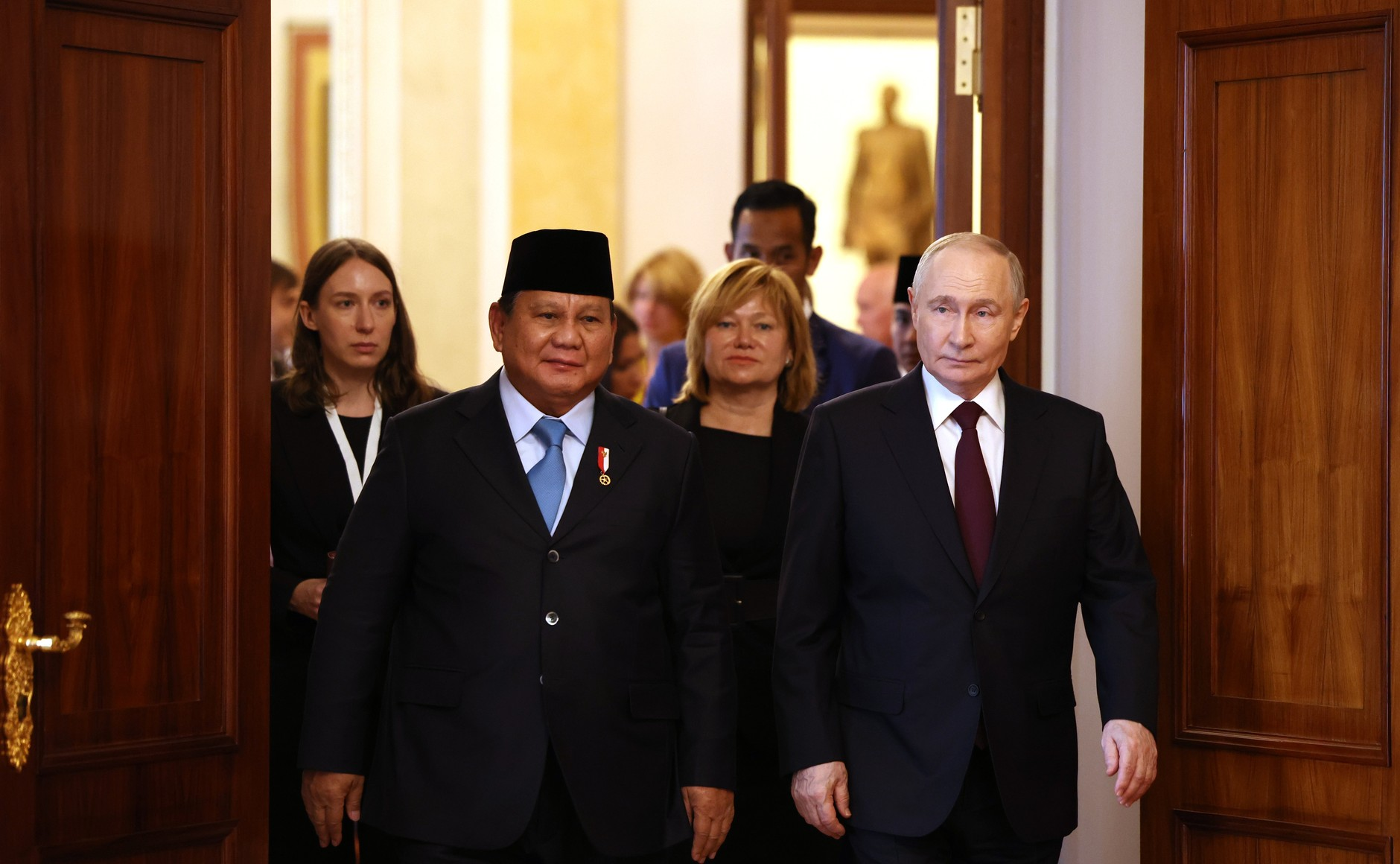
Vladimir Putin and Indonesian President Prabowo Subianto, 13 April 2026

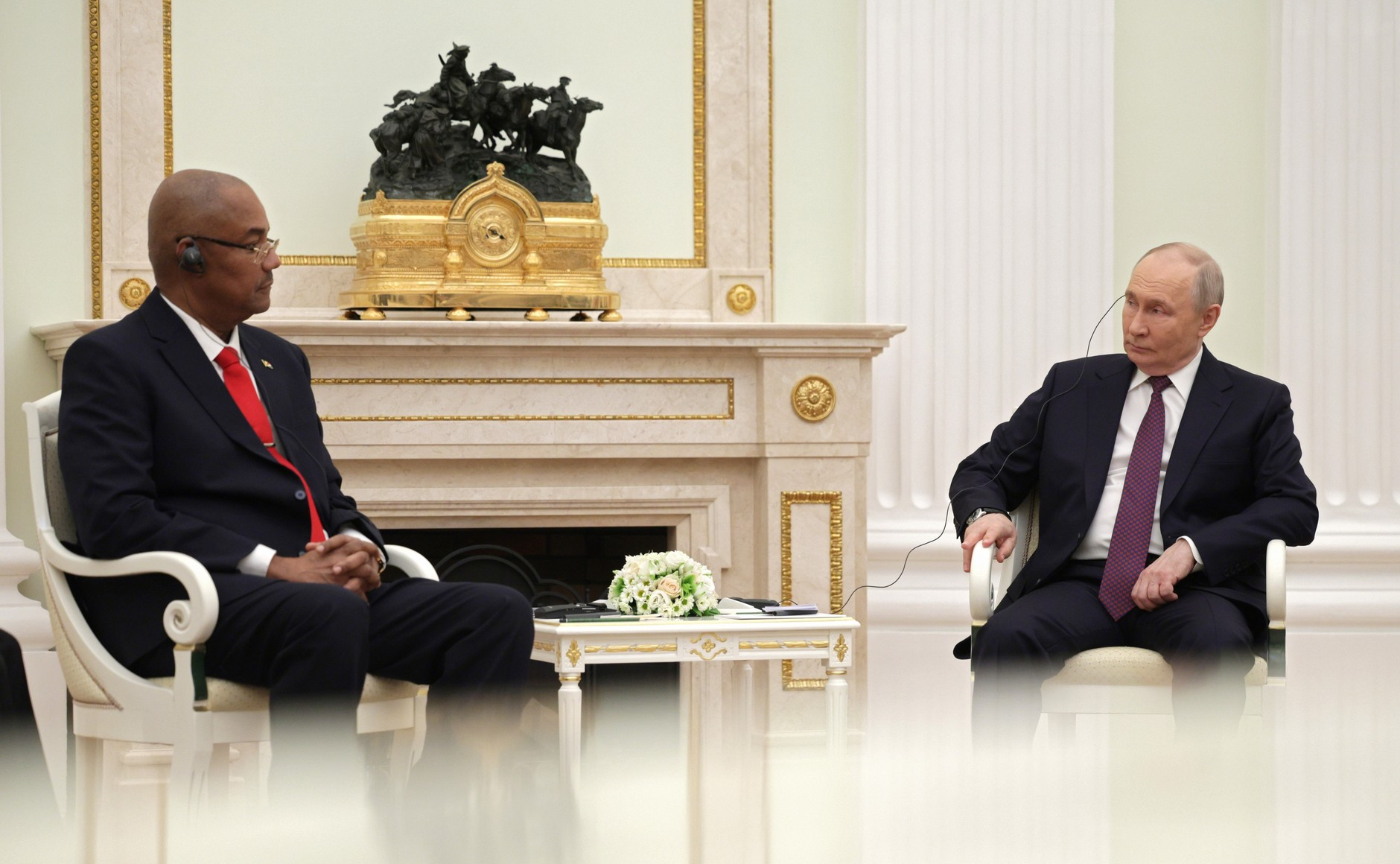
Vladimir Putin and Seychellois President Patrick Herminie, 22 April 2026

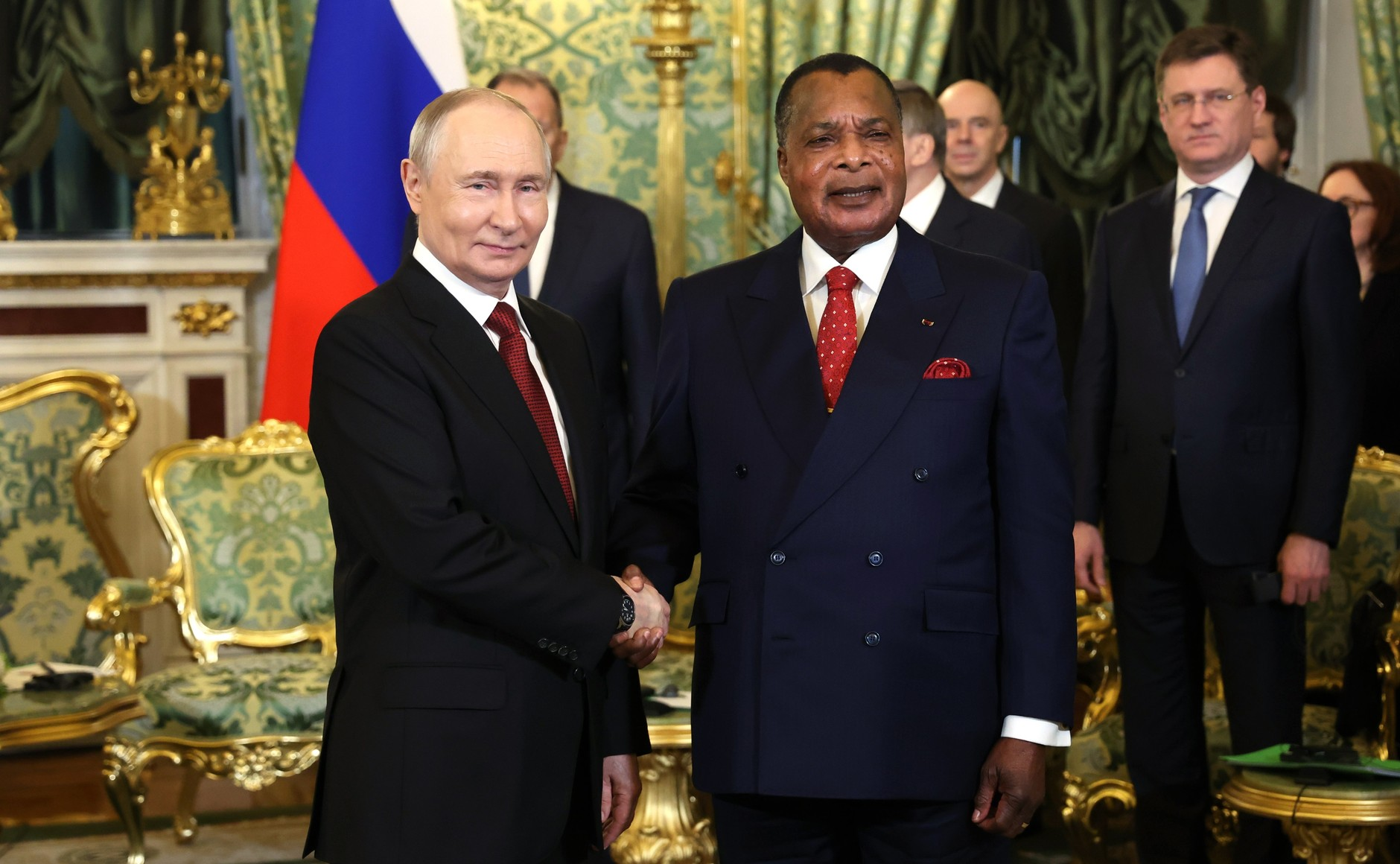
Vladimir Putin with Congolese President Denis Sassou Nguesso, 29 April 2026

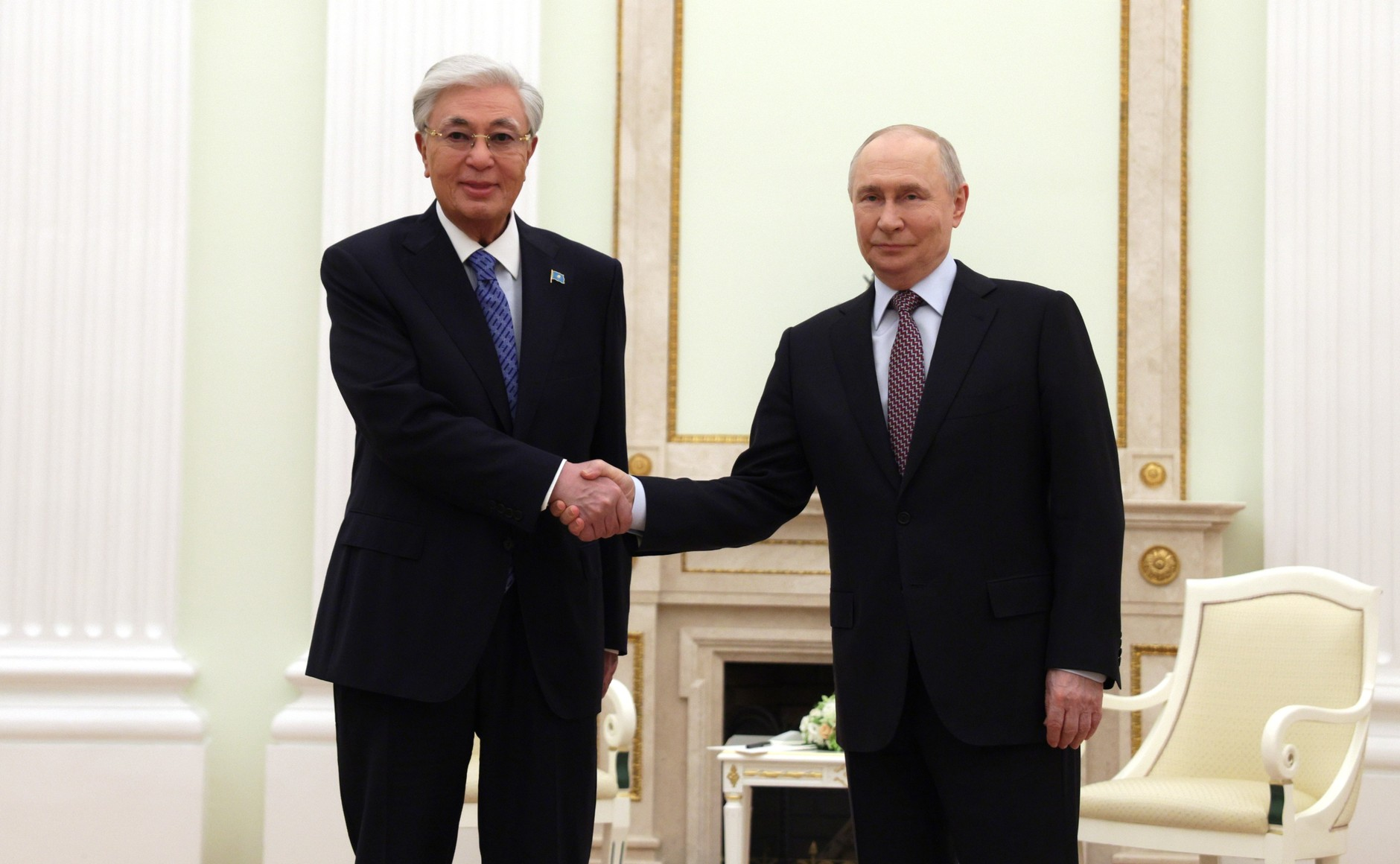
Vladimir Putin with Kazakh President Kassym-Jomart Tokayev in Moscow, 8 May 2026

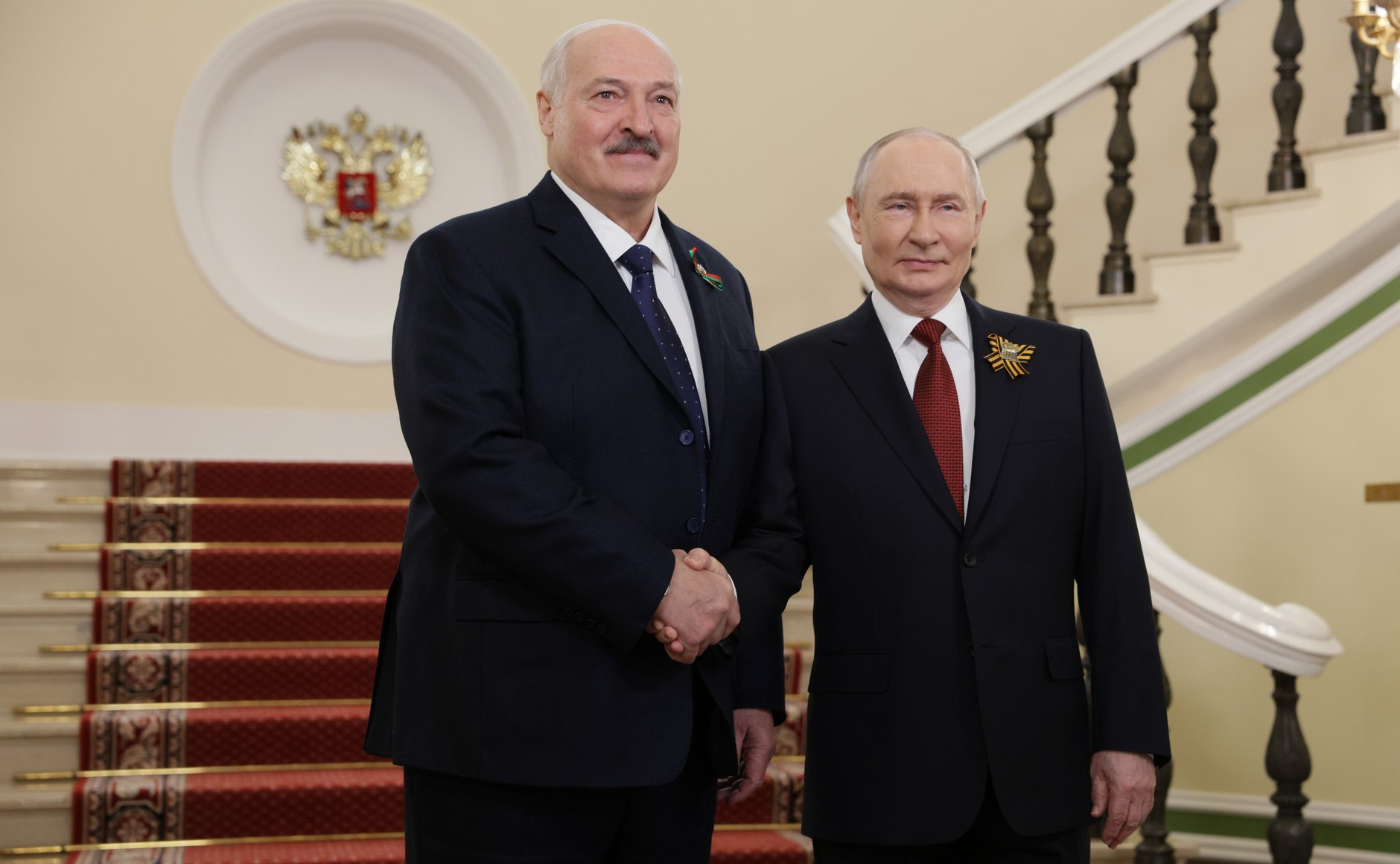
Vladimir Putin with Belarusian President Alexander Lukashenko in Moscow on 9 May 2026

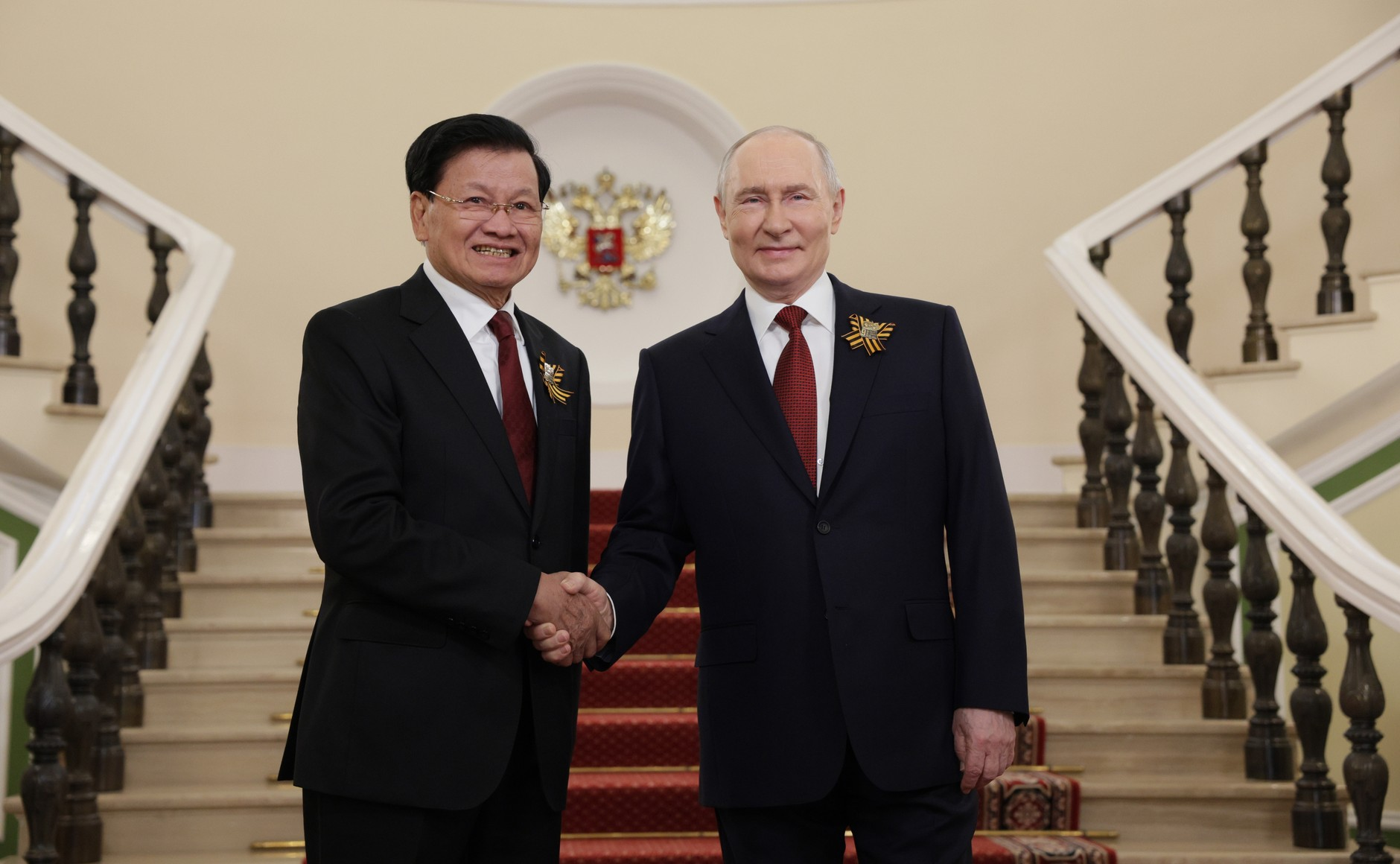
Vladimir Putin with Laotian leader Thongloun Sisoulith in Moscow on 9 May 2026

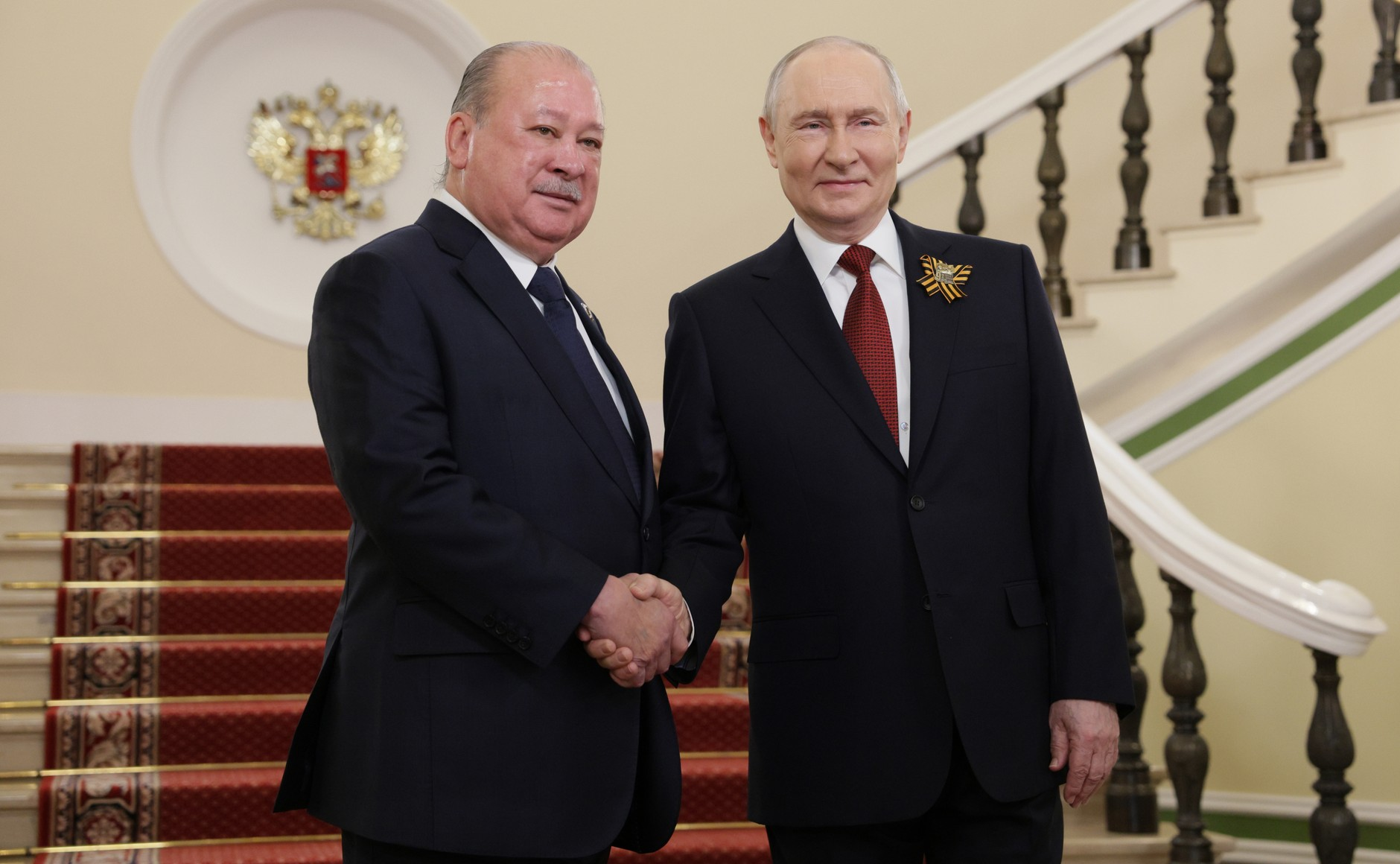
Vladimir Putin with King of Malaysia Ibrahim ibni Iskandar on 9 May 2026

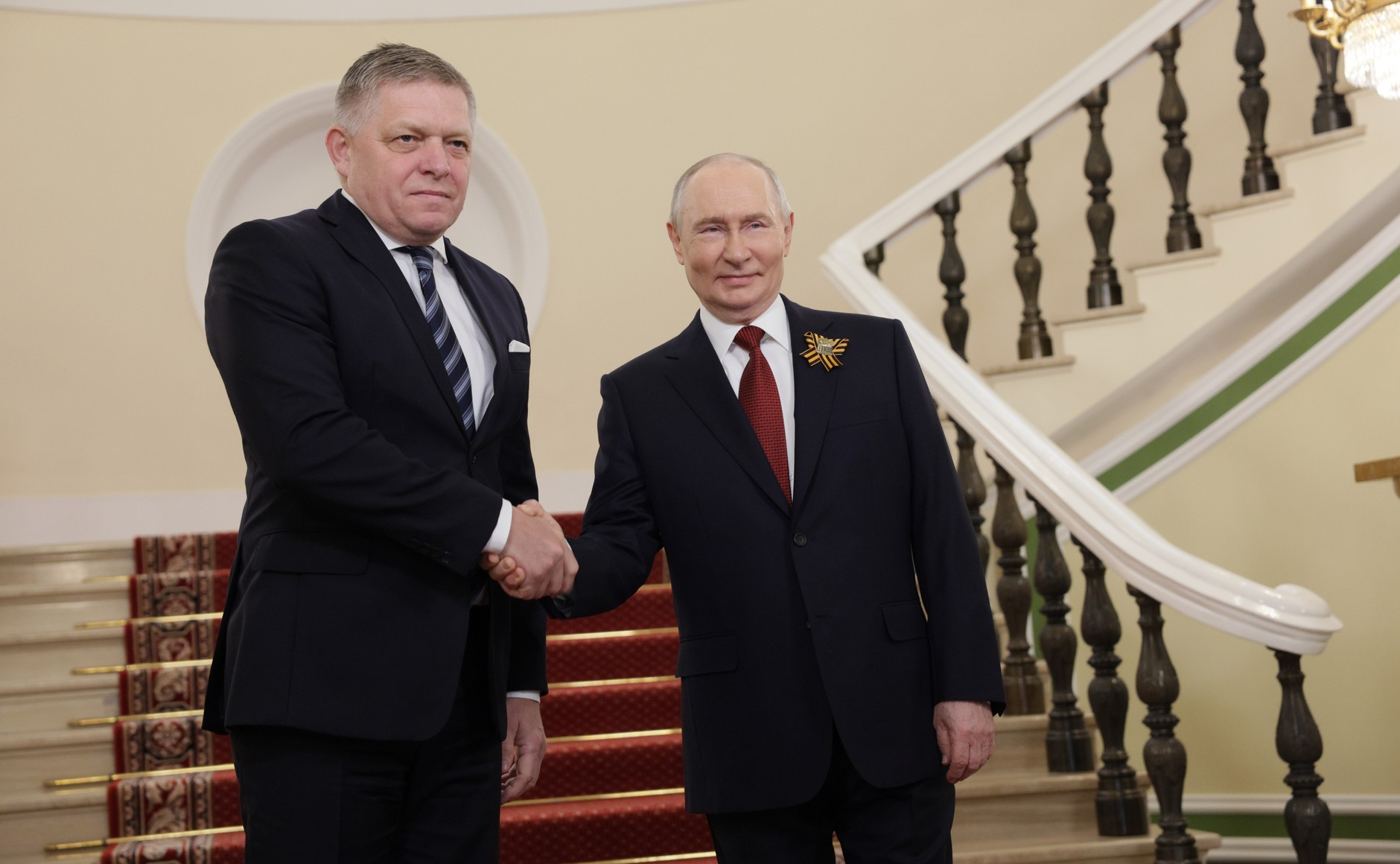
Vladimir Putin with Slovak Prime Minister Robert Fico in Moscow on 9 May 2026

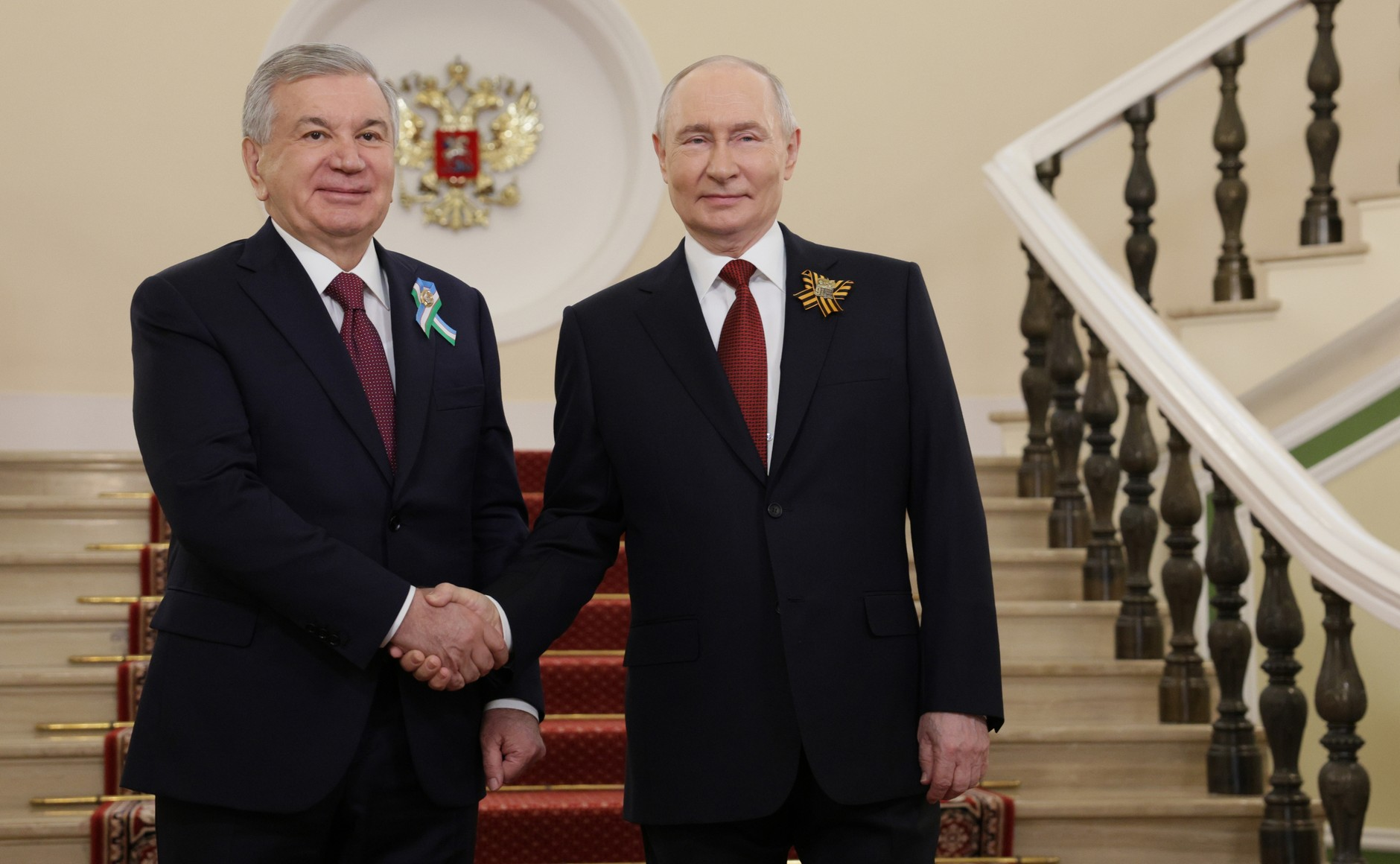
Vladimir Putin with Uzbek President Shavkat Mirziyoyev in Moscow on 9 May 2026

== See also ==
- List of international presidential trips made by Vladimir Putin
