= Anna Ambakumyan =

Anna Ambakumyan Աննա Ամբակումյան

Background information
- Born: October 18, 1919; Yerevan, Armenia
- Died: September 21, 1999 (aged 79) Yerevan, Armenia
- Education: Moscow Conservatory
- Genres: Classical
- Occupations: Pianist, music educator
- Instrument: Piano

Anna Alexandrovna Ambakumyan (Armenian: Աննա Ալեքսանդրի Ամբակումյան; 18 October 1919 – 21 September 1999) was an Armenian pianist and music educator. A professor at the Komitas State Conservatory of Yerevan and one of the founders of the modern Armenian school of piano playing, she was named Honored Art Worker of the Armenian SSR in 1973 and Honored Artist of the Armenian SSR in 1961.

== Life and career ==
Ambakumyan was born in Yerevan on 18 October 1919. She received her early piano training in Yerevan with Yevgine Khankalamyan and continued her studies at the Moscow Conservatory in the classes of Konstantin Igumnov and Lev Oborin, graduating in 1945 and completing her postgraduate studies in 1948. She received the degree of Candidate of Art Criticism (kandidat) in 1954. She is counted among the Armenian representatives of Igumnov's piano school, alongside Arno Babajanian, Mariya Gambaryan and Ketty Malkhasyan.

In the 1940s she taught at the Tchaikovsky Music School and the Romanos Melikian Music College in Yerevan, and from 1948 at the Komitas State Conservatory of Yerevan, where she headed a department of special piano from 1968 and held the title of professor from 1972. She died in Yerevan on 21 September 1999.

== Performing career ==
Ambakumyan appeared in recitals and with symphony orchestras in Armenia and abroad, performing under conductors including Konstantin Saradzhev, Mikael Maluntsyan, Tauno Hannikainen, Mircea Basarab, Algis Žiūraitis, Arnold Katz, Ohan Durian and Emin Khachaturian. Her repertoire ranged from Bach, Beethoven, Chopin, Liszt, Tchaikovsky and Rachmaninoff to Armenian composers, including Komitas, Aram Khachaturian and Arno Babajanian. She gave the first performances of numerous piano works by Armenian composers, among them Geghuni Chitchian, Haro Stepanian, Gayane Chebotaryan, Alexander Arutiunian, Stepan Jrbashyan, Eduard Abrahamyan and Edvard Baghdasaryan.

In 1972 she performed and recorded Komitas's dances; these interpretations were noted for their vividness and for the unity of dance movement and musical thought.

=== Khachaturian's Piano Concerto ===
Khachaturian's Piano Concerto occupied a central place in Ambakumyan's repertoire. She first encountered the work in the early 1940s, when Lev Oborin was still its only performer, and took it up in the 1960s, playing it for the composer, who praised the precision with which she captured his music and considered making a recording of the concerto with her. Her first public performance of the concerto with orchestra took place in 1972 under Aram Katanyan; her final public appearance with the work was on 18 September 1987 in the Great Hall of the Yerevan Philharmonic (now the Aram Khachaturian Concert Hall) under Emin Khachaturian. In December 1987 she presented the concerto at the Yerevan Conservatory together with a lecture on problems of its interpretation.

== Teaching ==
Ambakumyan's teaching career at the Komitas State Conservatory spanned more than fifty years, during which she trained over one hundred pianists, many of whom became laureates of international competitions and teachers at music institutions in Armenia and abroad. Her students and assistants included Irina Hakobyan, Alexander Gurgenov (who completed his postgraduate studies under her in 1977), Gohar Zalinyan, Naira Hakobyan, Anna Khachatryan and Armine Soghomonyan. Through her students her school extended to later generations of Armenian pianists: Gurgenov's own students include the internationally known pianists Hayk Melikyan and Nareh Arghamanyan.

She summarized her teaching methods in the book Moi pedagogicheskie printsipy [My Pedagogical Principles], published in Yerevan in 2000, and compiled and edited the collection Concert Pieces for Piano (1971).

== Legacy ==
The monograph Muzyka – zhizn' moya [Music Is My Life] by the musicologist Irina Tigranova, published in Moscow in 1994, is devoted to Ambakumyan's life and art. A memorial evening dedicated to her was held at the Aram Khachaturian House-Museum in Yerevan in 2003.

== Works ==
- Concert Pieces for Piano (compiler and editor), Yerevan, 1971.
- Moi pedagogicheskie printsipy [My Pedagogical Principles], Yerevan, 2000.

== Bibliography ==
- Tigranova, Irina. Muzyka – zhizn' moya: Tvorcheskiy put' A. A. Ambakumyan. Moscow: Muzyka, 1994.
- Encyclopedia of Armenian Music. Yerevan, 2019, p. 42.
- Apoyan, Shushanik. Nezabyvaemye imena: Ocherki o pianistakh-armyanakh. Yerevan: YSC, 2008.
- Musical Armenia, 2011, no. 3–4 (42–43), pp. 2–9.
- Zolotova, Irina. "Kontsert Khachaturyana v traktovkakh armyanskikh pianistov poslednikh desyatiletiy". In Aram Khachaturyan and Music of XX Century. Yerevan: Archesh, 2003.
