= 2026 Moscow Victory Day Parade =

Russian military parade

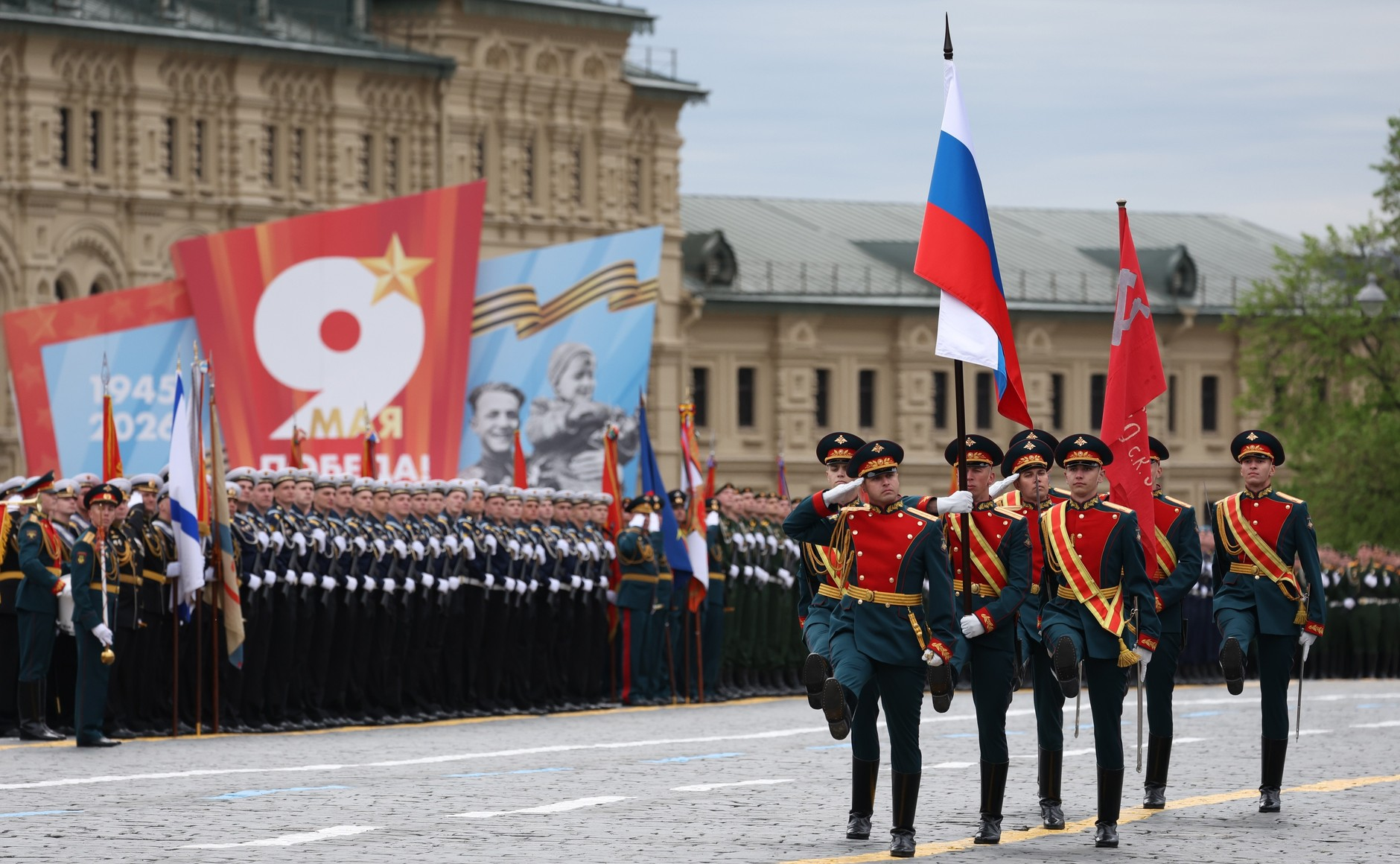
- Date: May 9, 2026
- Time: 10:00—10:50 (MSK)
- Location: Red Square, Moscow, Russia
- Participants: troops of the two countries: Russia; North Korea

The 2026 Moscow Victory Day Parade was a military parade that was held in Red Square, Moscow, Russia, on 9 May 2026, to commemorate the 81st anniversary of Victory Day, which celebrates the defeat of Nazi Germany and the end of World War II in Europe.

The parade was scaled down, lasting only 45 minutes and not featuring a mobile military column for the first time since 2008 due to security concerns from the Russo-Ukrainian war.

== Parade summary ==
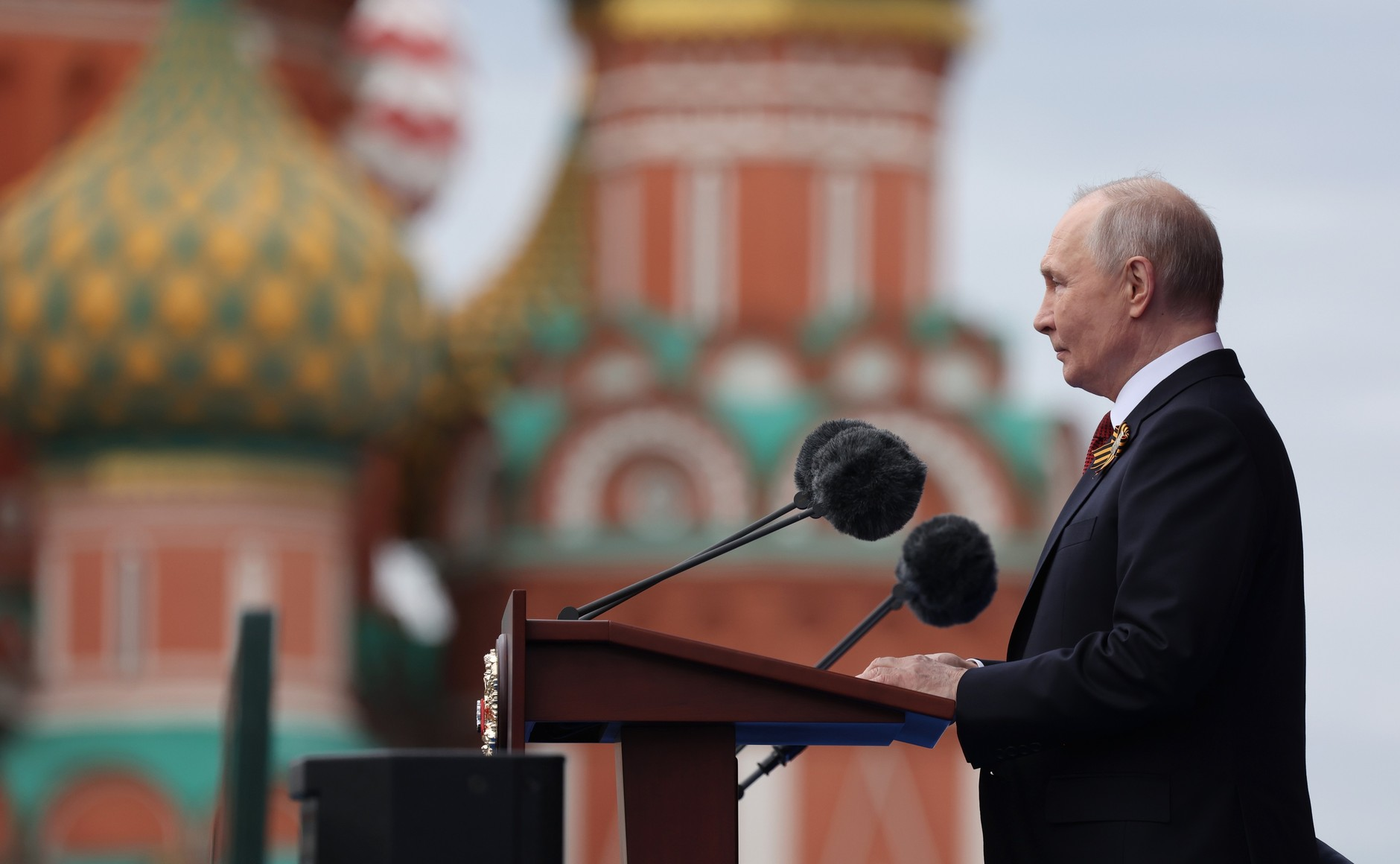
Russian President Vladimir Putin speaking at the tribune

After public discussion and exchanges of threats about the safety of the parade, it was held after US president Donald Trump secured the agreement of Ukraine not to attack the event, contingent on an exchange of 1,000 prisoners of war by each side. Ukrainian president Volodymyr Zelenskyy signed a mocking decree granting Russia permission to hold the parade.

The parade was scaled down and curtailed to only 45 minutes, and for the first time since its reintroduction in 2008, did not feature a mobile column of military technologies, due to security fears stemming from the Russo-Ukrainian war.

In between the anthem and the beginning of the Parade, a segment dedicated to the branches and arms of the Russian Armed Forces, including the recently founded Unmanned Systems Forces, and their activities in the war with Ukraine was played.

== Foreign dignitaries in attendance ==
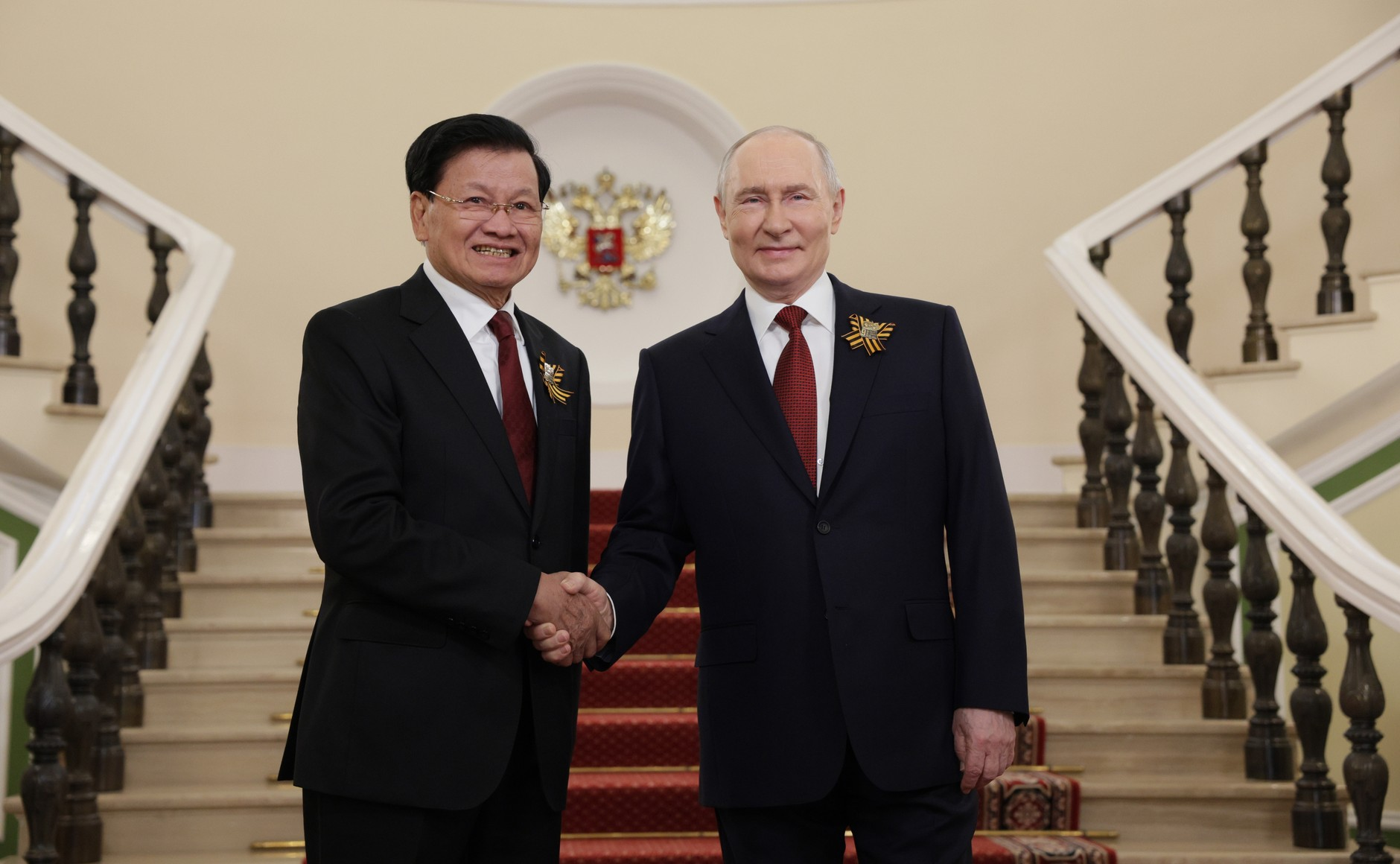
Vladimir Putin with Laotian President Thongloun Sisoulith before the 2026 Victory Day Parade

=== State leaders ===
- President of Belarus Alexander Lukashenko
- President of Kazakhstan Kassym-Jomart Tokayev
- President of Laos and General Secretary of the Revolutionary Party Thongloun Sisoulith
- King of Malaysia Ibrahim Iskandar
- President of Uzbekistan Shavkat Mirziyoyev

=== Other leaders ===
- President of Republika Srpska Siniša Karan
- Speaker of the National Assembly of Republika Srpska Nenad Stevandić
- (Republika Srpska) President of the Alliance of Independent Social Democrats Milorad Dodik
- President of Abkhazia Badra Gunba
- President of South Ossetia Alan Gagloev

=== Other participants ===
- Prime Minister of Slovakia Robert Fico (Note: Did not attend watching the military parade itself, only the official diplomatic reception. Also laid wreath at the Tomb of the Unknown Soldier at the Kremlin Wall.)

== Foreign commentary and laws ==
- (Ukraine) On May 8, 2026, President Volodymyr Zelenskyy issued a decree which permitted the parade to go on in Moscow, and that from 10:00 AM Kyiv Time to the end of May 9th, Red Square was to be excluded from a plan on usage of weapons.

== Full order of the 2026 parade ==
Bold indicates first appearance, italic indicates multiple appearances, Bold and italic indicate returning appearance, all indicated unless otherwise noted.

- Andrey Belousov, Minister of Defense of the Russian Federation (parade reviewing inspector)
- **Colonel General Andrey Mordvichev,** Commander-in-Chief of the Russian Ground Forces (parade commander)

=== Military bands ===
- Massed Military Bands of the Armed Forces under the direction of the Senior Director of Music of the Military Band Service of the Armed Forces of Russia, Major General Timofey Mayakin
- Cadet Band of the Institute of Military Band Conductors of the Ministry of Defence Military University – led by Colonel Sergey Vovk

=== Infantry column ===
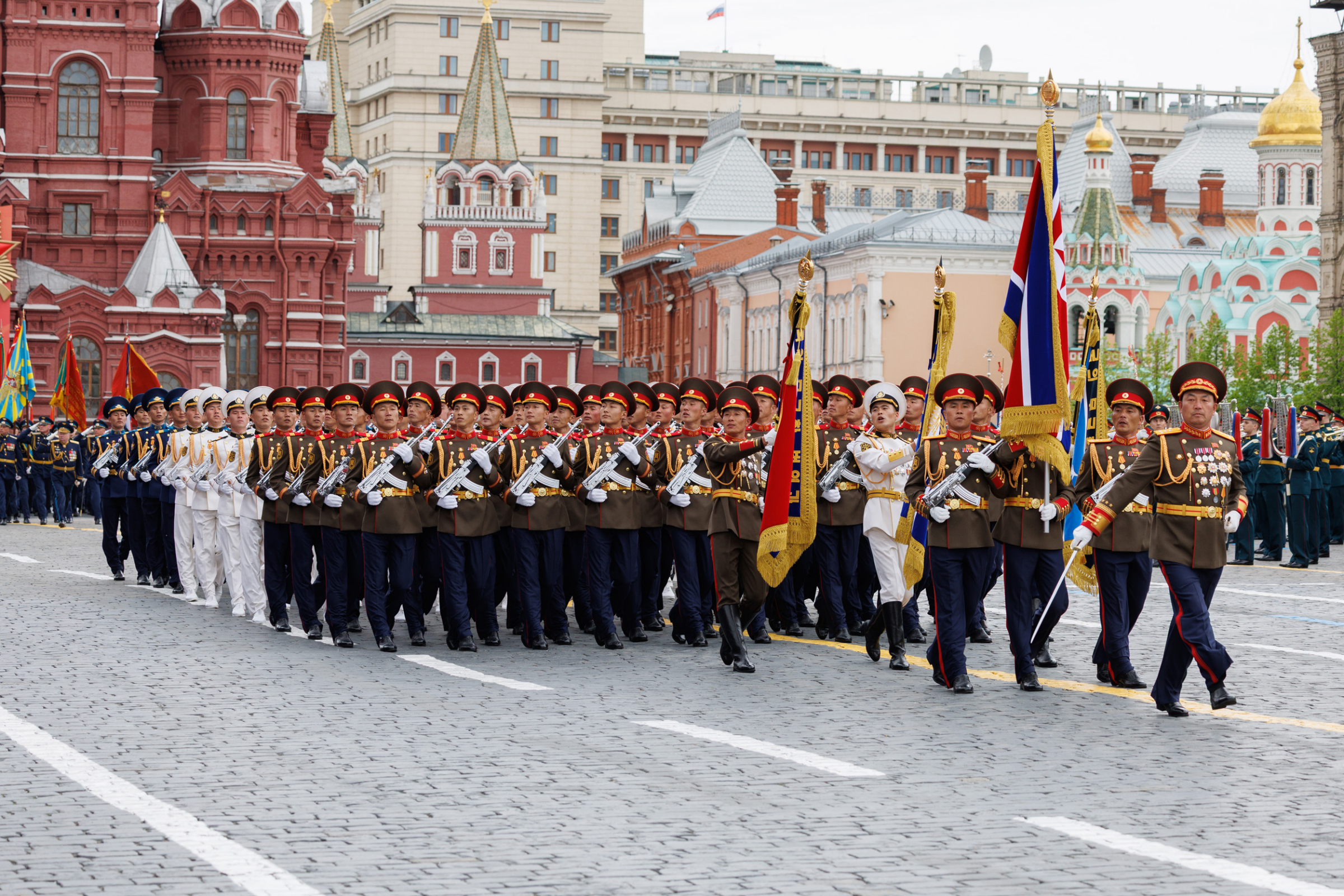
North Korean soldiers on Red Square during the 2026 Victory Day Parade

- Colour Guard and 1st Honour Guard Company of the 1st Honor Guard Battalion, 154th Preobrazhensky Independent Commandant's Regiment
- Combined Arms Academy of the Armed Forces of the Russian Federation - led by Lieutenant General Oleg Tsekov
- Unit of Participants of the Special Military Operation - led by Colonel Mirlan Dzhumagaleyev and Colonel Zarikto Angarkhayev.
- (North Korea) **Personnel of the Korean People's Army** - led by Senior Colonel Choe Yong Hun
- Zhukovsky - Gagarin Air Force Academy - led by Colonel General Gennadiy Zibrov
- Combined Regiment of the Russian Navy
  - Naval Polytechnic Institute - led by Rear Admiral Andrey Klimenko
  - Pacific Naval Institute "Admiral Sergei Makarov" - led by Colonel Mikhail Bezgin
- Peter the Great Military Academy of the Strategic Missile Forces - led by Major General Farid Shigmardanov
- Ryazan Guards Higher Airborne Command School "General of the Army Vasily Margelov" - led by Colonel Oleg Ponomaryov
- Moscow Higher Military Command School "Supreme Soviet of Russia" - led by Major General Roman Benyukov

=== Aerial column ===
- Sukhoi Su-30 and Mikoyan MiG-29 fighter jets (Russian Knights & Swifts aerobatic teams) - led by Colonel Andrey Alekseyev
- Sukhoi Su-25 attack aircraft - led by Lieutenant Colonel Vladimir Mordasov

== Music ==
Music was performed by the massed bands of the Moscow Garrison, commanded by Major general Timofey Mayakin.

Inspection of Troops

- Sacred War ("Священная война") by Aleksandr Aleksandrov
- Where Does the Motherland Begin? ("С чего начинается Родина?") by Veniamin Basner
- Jubilee Slow March "25 Years of the Red Army" (Юбилейный встречный марш "25 лет РККА") by Semyon Tchernetsky
- March of the Life-Guard Preobrazhensky Regiment ("Марш Лейб-гвардии Преображенского полка")
- Slow March of Military Schools ("Встречный марш военных училищ") by Semyon Tchernetsky
- Slow March for Carrying Out the Combat Banner ("Встречный Марш для выноса Боевого Знамени") by Dmitriy Kadeyev
- Guards Slow March of the Navy (Гвардейский Встречный Марш Военно-Морского Флота") by Nikolay Ivanov-Radkevich
- Slav'sya ("Славься") by Mikhail Glinka
- Moscow Parade Fanfare ("Московская Парадная Фанфара")

Speech by President of the Russian Federation, Vladimir Putin

- State Anthem of the Russian Federation ("Государственный гимн Российской Федерации") by Aleksandr Aleksandrov
- Signal Retreat ("Сигнал Отбой")

Infantry Column

- Drum and Fife based on the theme from the March "General Miloradovich" ("Тема из Марша Генерал Милорадович") by Valeriy Khalilov
- Metropolitan March ("Марш "Столичный") by Viktor Runov
- On Guard for Peace ("На страже Мира") by Boris Diyev
- Air March ("Авиaмарш") by Yuliy Khayt
- March The Sea is Calling (Марш "Море зовёт") by Aleksandra Pakhmutova
- March of the Artillerymen ("Марш артиллеристов") by Tikhon Khrennikov
- We Need One Victory ("Нам нужна одна Победа") by Bulat Okudzhava
- Let's Go ("В путь") by Vasily Solovyov-Sedoy

Air Segment

- Air March ("Авиaмарш") by Yuriy Khayt

Conclusion of the Parade

- To Serve Russia ("Служить России") by Eduard Khanok
- Farewell of Slavianka (Прощание Славянки) by Vasily Agapkin

== See also ==
- 1945 Moscow Victory Parade
- Victory Day (9 May)
- Victory in Europe Day
- Victory Day parades
