= Institute of Military Band Conductors =

Russian armed forces higher education campus

Coordinates: 55.7676°N 37.5941°E

- Established: November 28, 1935; 90 years ago
- Parent institution: Military University of the Ministry of Defense of the Russian Federation
- Affiliations: Russian Armed Forces
- Location: Komsomolsky Prospect, Building No. 20, Moscow, Moscow Oblast, Russia
- Government Department: Ministry of Defense of Russia
- Website: vumo.mil.ru

The Military Institute (of Military Conductors) (Russian: Военный институт (военных дирижёров)) of the Military University of the Ministry of Defense of the Russian Federation is a higher educational institution engaged in the training of military conductors of military bands within the Military Band Service of the Armed Forces of Russia.

== History ==
=== Early years ===
The Military Faculty at the Tchaikovsky Moscow State Conservatory was created on November 28, 1935, by a joint order of the People's Commissar of Defense Marshal of the Soviet Union Kliment Voroshilov and the People's Commissar of Education Andrei Bubnov, on the basis of the Military Bandmaster Department of the conservatory and the bandmaster class of the Frunze Military Academy. The faculty's creation was overseen by Semyon Chernetsky, Inspector of Military Orchestras of the Red Army, and Heinrich Neuhaus, Director of the Moscow State Conservatory . The new educational institution was headed by Brigade Commissar Naum Elinson, and in 1938, Brigade Quartermaster Anatoly Gutor became its head.

On February 8, 1936, the first students began classes. In 1938, the faculty expanded, establishing full-time postgraduate programs in "Conducting" and "Instrumentation," and later, "Military Band Instrumentation" and "Theory and History of Music." The following academic year, several specialized departments were opened: conducting, instrumentation, military band instruments, piano, and music theory and history. Between 1936 and 1941, six classes of military bandmasters graduated. As of June 22, 1941, 30 students were enrolled in the military faculty. After the outbreak of the World War II and specifically with the commencement of Operation Barbarossa, the faculty began training military bandmasters for the Red Army on an accelerated program, and the faculty was then transferred to Saratov. Many graduates took direct part in the fighting.

In 1944, the faculty became a separate university, renamed the Higher School of Military Bandmasters of the Red Army. In August 1945, the university was ceremoniously presented with a Battle Banner.

=== Post-war ===
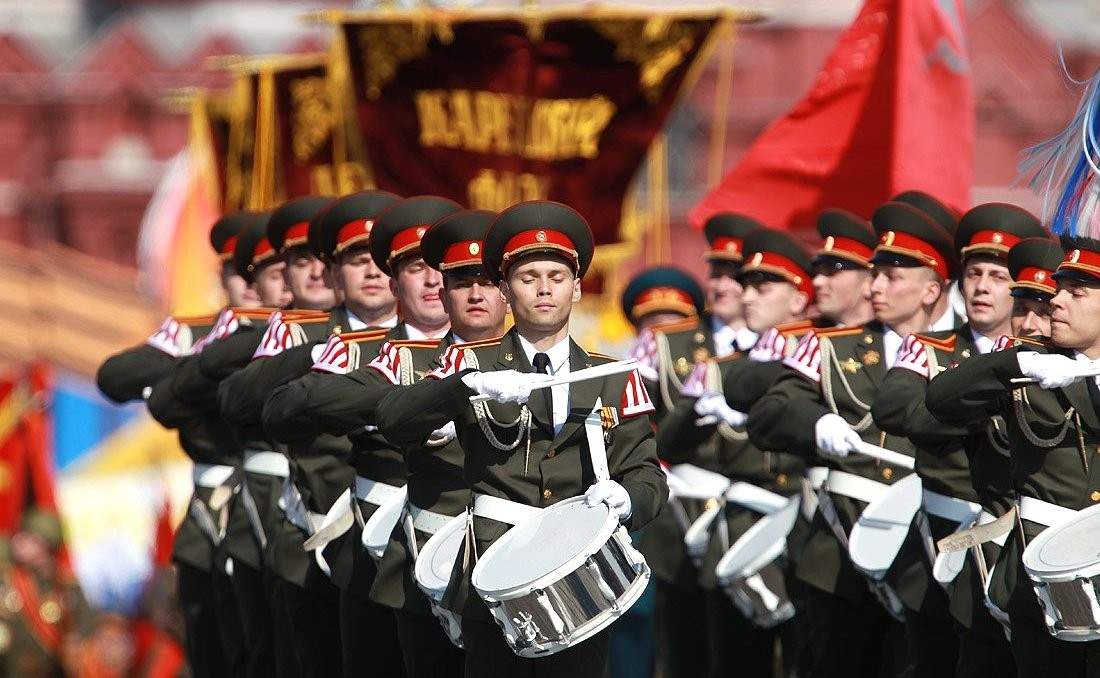
Drummers of the institute during the 2010 Moscow Victory Day Parade.

With the February 1946, renaming of the Red Army to the "Soviet Army", in November 1946, the university was renamed the Higher School of Military Conductors of the Soviet Army. In 1950, the Higher School of Military Conductors of the Soviet Army was reorganized into the Institute of Military Conductors, in which form it existed for ten years. In 1956, the students of the Institute of Military Conductors were joined by cadets from the naval faculty of the Leningrad Conservatory. in 1960, during the campaign to reduce the size of the Soviet Armed Forces, the Institute of Military Conductors was reorganized into the Military Conducting Faculty at the Moscow Conservatory.

=== Post-1991 ===
On April 4, 2001, the Government of the Russian Federation established the Moscow Military Conservatory. On April 10, 2006, the government again transformed the organization into the Institute of Military Band Conductors, transferring it to the Military University.

== Training ==
It often holds inter-university practical conferences on musical training methods.

== Student life ==
=== Band ===
The Cadet Band of the Institute of Military Band Conductors (Russian: Оркестр Курсантов Военного Института) is the official military marching band of the institute. It has repeatedly performed at several international competitions and festivals, in various television and radio broadcasts. It was a diploma winner of the review competition of the regular military bands of Moscow Military District. It annually participates in the Moscow Victory Day Parade and the parade dedicated to 1941 October Revolution Parade.

=== Moscow Parades ===
During the Presidency of Dmitry Medvedev, the institute formed the corps of drums for the annual Moscow Victory Day Parade on Red Square, replacing the cadets of the Moscow Military Music College. They returned again in the 2026 Moscow Victory Day Parade, reflecting the decision to pull out junior cadets as a result of security precautions made in light of the Russo-Ukrainian war.

== Famous alumni ==
- Timofey Mayakin – Director of the Military Band Service of the Armed Forces of Russia since 2016.
- Lieutenant General Valery Khalilov – Director of the Military Band Service of the Armed Forces of Russia from 2002-2016.
- Colonel Armen Poghosyan – Director of the Band of the General Staff of the Armed Forces of Armenia from 1992-2022.
- Major General Volodymyr Derkach – Senior Military Director of the Military Music Department of the General Staff of the Ukrainian Armed Forces from 1995 to 2014.
- Volodymyr Dashkovsky – Senior Military Director of the Military Music Department of the General Staff of the Ukrainian Armed Forces from 2014 to 2023.
- Dmitry Pertsev - Director of the Military Band of the Leningrad Military District in the 1970s.

== See also ==
- Russian military bands
- Canadian Forces School of Music
- Royal Military School of Music
