= Valery Marchenkov =

Russian military leader

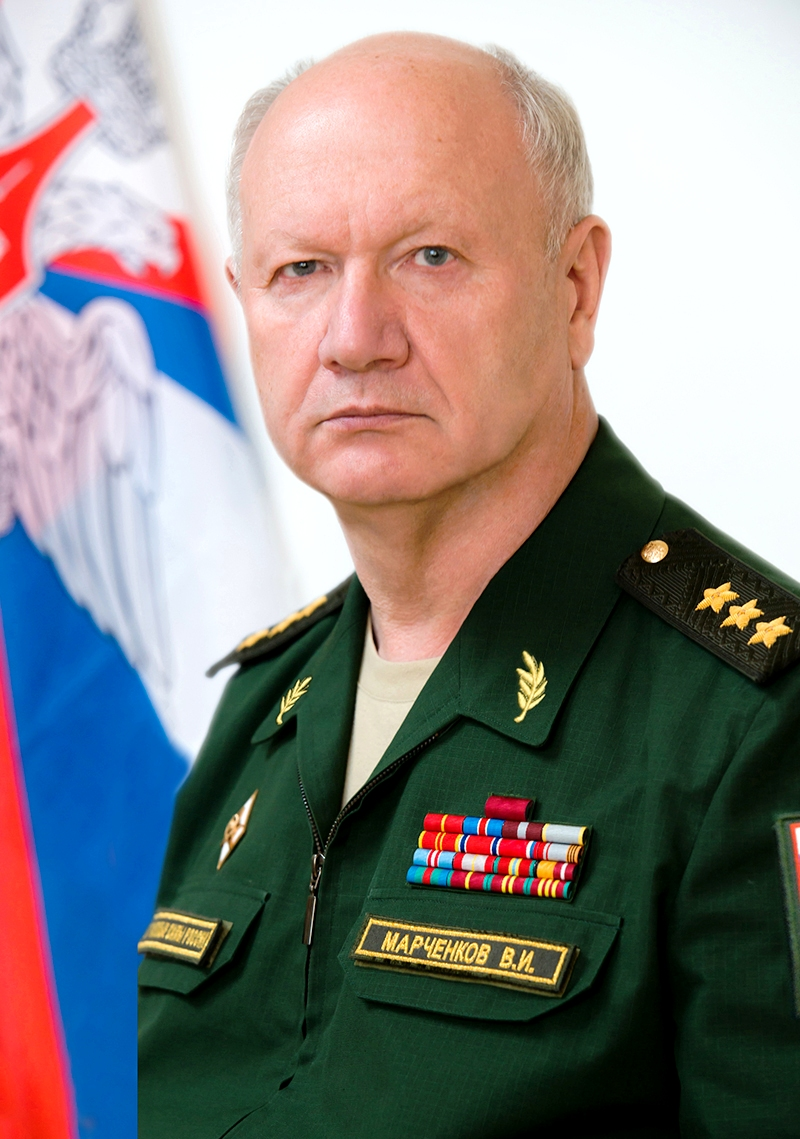
Official Portrait.

Colonel General Valery Ivanovich Marchenkov (Russian: Валерий Иванович Марченков; born July 5, 1947) is a Russian military leader and professor.

== Biography ==
He was born into a family of forestry workers in Osinovka, Monastyrshchinsky District, Smolensk Oblast on 5 July 1947. He worked in construction for a year after graduating from school.

He has served in the Soviet Army since 1966. He graduated from the Moscow Higher Combined Arms Command School in 1970. From 1970 to 1978, he served in the 2nd Guards Motor Rifle Division. He graduated from the Frunze Military Academy in 1981. From 1981 he served in the Group of Soviet Forces in Germany as commander of the 240th motorized rifle regiment, in 1984–1986, commander of the 6th Separate Guards Motor Rifle Brigade.

He graduated from the Military Academy of the General Staff in 1988. From 1988 to 1992, he commanded the 2nd Guards Motor Rifle Division, and from 1992, he was First Deputy Army Commander. It was here where he, a Major General at the time, first encountered Sergey Surovikin, who was one of his company commanders. From 1996, he commanded the 30th Guards Army Corps of the Leningrad Military District stationed in Karelia. He took part in the First Chechen War.

From 1998, he has served as First Deputy Chief of the Main Directorate of Combat Training and Service of Troops of the Russian Armed Forces. In June 2001, he was appointed Chief of the Military University of the Ministry of Defense. Upon reaching the end of his military service, he was discharged from the military in 2009, but continued to lead the university. He was relieved of his post in October 2017. He continues to work at the university as Chief Research Fellow of the Military University. He is a member of the Council of Rectors of Universities in Moscow and the Moscow Region. In 2020, he was a candidate for President of the Russian Academy of Sciences.

Colonel General Valery Marchenkov hands an award to a United States Army private for his participation in the 2010 Moscow Victory Day Parade.

== Awards ==
- Order "For Merit to the Fatherland" 4th degree
- Order of Alexander Nevsky
- Order of Military Merit
- Order of the Red Star
- Medal "For Battle Merit"
- Honorary Worker of Higher Professional Education of the Russian Federation
