= Sokrat Khanyan =

Armenian author, poet and novelist (1930–2026)

Sokrat Khanyan Սոկրատ Խանյան
- Born: 22 January 1930; Aknakbyur, Nagorno-Karabakh Autonomous Oblast, Azerbaijan SSR, Transcaucasian SFSR, USSR
- Died: 30 July 2026 (aged 96)
- Occupations: Poet, translator, literary critic, publicist.
- Relatives: Hayk Melikyan (grandson)
- Writing career
- Period: 1950–2026

Sokrat Agalari Khanyan (Armenian: Սոկրատ Աղալարի Խանյան; 22 January 1930 – 30 July 2026) was an Armenian poet, translator, literary critic, publicist, academic, and doctor of philology, who was a member of Writers Union of Armenia and of the USSR Writers' Union from 1958 until his death in 2026.

== Early life and career ==
Sokrat Khanyan was born in the village of Aknakbyur in Hadrut region of Nagorno-Karabakh Autonomous Oblast. In 1944, he graduated from the seven-year school in his native village, and then from the secondary school in the village of Harlan Edillu (now Ukhtadzor). From 1947 to 1948 he worked in his native village as the secretary of the communist organization, and the head of the house of culture. Between 1949 and 1953 he studied and graduated from Baku V. I. Lenin State Pedagogical Institute, Department of Armenian Language and Literature, Faculty of Philology.

In 1950 Khanyan's first poem dedicated to the memory of the elder brother, poet Suren Khanyan, who died in the Great Patriotic War, was published in "Communist" newspaper. Between 1953 and 1962 he worked as a journalist in the editorial office of "Communist" Armenian Republican newspaper published in Baku. He has been a member of the USSR Writers 'Union since [1958], Artsakh] Writers' Union since 1994. In 1959 he published his first collection of poems entitled "Karkach". Between 1962 and 1965 he studied in Baku. In the postgraduate course of the Lenin State Pedagogical Institute, with a degree in "Armenian Literature". At the same time, he taught in the department of Armenian language and literature. In 1965 Institute of Literature after Manuk Abeghyan of NAS RA he defended a thesis on "Nairi Zaryan Dramaturgy", and received the degree of Candidate of Philological Sciences. In 1969 after the closure of the Armenian department of the Lenin State Pedagogical Institute of Baku, he moved to Stepanakert where he continued teaching at the Department of Armenian Language and Literature of Stepanakert State Pedagogical Institute as an associate professor.

From 1974 to 1988 he was the chairman of the Student Scientific Council of Artsakh State University, and from 1975 to 1976 the chairman of the regional "Gitelik" company. Between 1978 and 1981 he was the Dean of the Linguistic Faculty of Stepanakert Pedagogical Institute (ArSU). Between 1984 and 2007 Khanyan was first the head of the chair of the Armenian language, literature, then literature and journalism at ArSU. Between 1985 and 1990 he was the chairman of the NKR Regional Committee for the Defense of Peace. In 2002 he defended his thesis at the Abeghyan Institute of Literature on "The Fate of the Homeland in Armenian Poetry (1950–1990)" and was awarded the degree of Doctor of Philological Sciences. In 2004 Khanyan received a professor's diploma in "Literature".

In 2010, on his 80th birthday, he was awarded a Mesrop Mashtots medal, by President of the Artsakh Republic Bako Sahakyan.

== Personal life and death ==
In January 2020, Khanyan celebrated his 90th birthday and 70th birthday as a poet. Khanyan died on 30 July 2026, at the age of 96.

Sokrat Khanyan's grandson is Hayk Melikyan, an Armenian pianist and composer.

== Works ==
=== Collections of poems ===
1. Karkach (1959)
2. Friendship (1963)
3. My heart is with you (1966)
4. Arsar (1968)
5. The Song of the Mountains (1972)
6. My Gift (1973)
7. We Are Still Waiting (1975)
8. Mountain Bells (1978)
9. On Your behalf (1980)
10. The lights of longing. Stepanakert, 1990
11. Mirza Ibragimov: [Tv. portra.] / Socrat Khanyan, 108, [1] p. silt 17 cm, Baku Yazychi 1986
12. Feat of Tatul Guryan: [On the life and work of the arm. owls. poet, 1912–1942] / Socrat Khanyan, 54 p. 16 cm, Stepanakert Mashtots 1991
13. Bells of Artsakh. Er. 1991
14. My rainbow. Stepanakert, 2000

== Awards ==
- NKR medal "Mesrop Mashtots" (NKR, 2010)
- NKR medal "Vachagan the Pious" (NKR, 2001)
- Medal "Maternal gratitude" (NKR, 2001)
- Prize to them. Muratsan (NKR JV for the study "Artsakh War and Armenian Poetry", 1998)
- Prize to them. Yeghishe of NKR (for the poem "Eagle of Artsakh", 1992)
- Medal "For Labor Distinction" (State Committee of Public Education and the Central Committee of Trade Unions of the USSR, 1990)

== See also ==
- Armenian literature
- Culture of Artsakh
