= Medea Abrahamyan =

Armenian cellist (1932–2021)

Background information
- Born: Medea Abrahamyan; 8 March 1932; Yerevan, Transcaucasian SFSR
- Died: 3 March 2021 (aged 88) Yerevan, Armenia
- Occupation: cellist
- Instrument: cello

Medea Abrahamyan (Armenian: Մեդեա Աբրահամյան; 8 March 1932 – 3 March 2021) was an Armenian cellist, People's Artist of Armenian SSR (1980) and Professor of the Yerevan Komitas State Conservatory (1983).

== Biography ==
Medea Abrahamyan was born in 1932 in Yerevan. She received her musical education at the ten-year Tchaikovsky Music School of Yerevan and later at Yerevan Komitas State Conservatory. In 1956, she graduated from Tchaikovsky Moscow State Conservatory and was one of the students of cellist Mstislav Rostropovich. She was a recipient of awards at the Vihaan International Festival of Arts (2nd Prize, 1955), the First Youth Festival of Armenia (1st Prize, 1957) and the Moscow All-Union Competition for Cellists (1st Prize, 1961).

Medea Abrahamyan performed in numerous countries, including France, Germany, Belgium, Luxembourg, Poland, Bulgaria, the Czech Republic, Slovakia, Hungary, Romania, Iceland, Korea, the United States, Canada, Argentina, Uruguay, Syria, Lebanon, the republics of the former USSR and more. Alongside her performances of the works of classical and contemporary composers, the works of Armenian composers for the cello formed a major part of her performances. Moreover, she performed most of these works for the first time, and those works have been created with her direct participation and have been dedicated to her.

Alongside her concerts, Abrahamyan also lectured at Yerevan Komitas State Conservatory and the ten-year Tchaikovsky School for decades. She has taught students of different nationalities and educated generations of musicians in her classroom, which is now widely recognized in not only Armenia, but also abroad.

She was a member of the juries of several international, All-Union and republican competitions and gave master classes.

== Awards ==
- State Prize of the Armenian SSR (1973)
- People's Artist of the Armenian SSR (1980)
- Professor of the Yerevan Komitas State Conservatory (1983)
- Knight of Armenian Art (2007)
- 1st Degree Medal for Services to Homeland (2012)
- Honorable citizen of the Bulgarian city of Russe
- RA Prime Minister's Gold Medal, 2016
- The major recipient of the Nairi Pan-Armenian music festival, 2017

== Bibliography ==
Books

- Anna Barsamyan; Araksi Saryan, "Medea Abrahamyan", Yerevan, 2000 (in Armenian)
- Medea Abrahamyan, "Կատարողի մտորումներ", Yerevan, 2014 (in Armenian and Russian)
- Rosa Yeghiazaryan, " Solo for cello", Yerevan, 2016 (in Armenian)
- Sergey Manvelyan, "Medea Abrahamyan", Yerevan, 2016 (in Armenian)

Journal & newspaper articles

- Mladá fronta, 1955, 3.června, Praha
- Рачев Х., Един незабравим концерт, Червено знаме, 1958, 28 ноември, Видин, България
- 조선 방문 쏘련 예술단 본도 공연, 평얀, 평얀, 1960, 7 월 29 일
- Jihlava, 1963, červen, Československo
- Саакян Н., Глубокая душа виолончели, Коммунист, Ереван, 1969, 5 октября
- Le soir, 1972, 28 décembre, Beyrouth, Liban
- Հովհաննիսյան Արմեն, Նվիրում և վաստակ, Սովետական Հայաստան, Երևան, 1973, սեպտեմբերի 23
- Cabrera N., Ciclo musical en el Coliseo: No sólo para Armenios, Clarin, Buenos Aires, 2 de mayo de 1973
- F. E., Embajada Apabullante, El País, 24 de mayo de 1973, Montevideo, Uruguay
- Բերկո Մարինա, Նվիրվում է Մեդեա Աբրահամյանին..., Սովետական արվեստ, Երևան, 1978, № 2, էջ 45-48:
- Золотова И., Источник взаимного обогащения (Медея Абрамян и армянская виолончельная соната), Советская музыка, Москва, 1978, № 8, с. 83-86.
- Բրուտյան Ց., Հայաստան աշխարհի հրաշքներից մեկը, Հայաստան, Երևան, 1994, մայիսի 12
- Грицевич В., На концерте Медеи Абрамян, Монреаль-Торонто, 1997, Монреаль, Канада
- Դանիել Երաժիշտ, Միջազգային մրցույթների հայազգի առաջին դափնեկիրները, Երաժշտական Հայաստան, Երևան, 2010, № 2, էջ 61-62:
- Sarkisian S., Ritterin der armenischen Kunst: Medea Abrahamyan, Köln, 2013, № 1, s. 34-35.
- Рухкян М., Вы рождены для виолончели, Новое время, Ереван, 1999, 30 января, с. 4.
