= Alexander Gurgenov =

Alexander Gurgenov Armenian: Ալեքսանդր Գուրգենով

Background information
- Born: February 18, 1951 (age 75); Lviv, Ukrainian SSR
- Origin: Soviet Union, Armenia
- Died: June 19, 2011 (aged 60) Yerevan, Armenia
- Genres: Classical
- Occupations: Pianist, music teacher
- Instrument: Piano

Alexander Gurgenov (Armenian: Ալեքսանդր Գուրգենով, 18 February 1951 – 19 June 2011) was an Armenian classical concert pianist and pedagogue.

== Biography ==
Alexander Gurgenov was born on 18 February 1951 in Lviv, Ukrainian SSR.

From 1958 to 1969 he studied at Lviv's Specialised Ten-Year Music School in the class of Professor Alexander Edelmann, already appearing both in recitals and with orchestra during his youth. He continued his education in 1969–1971 at the Lviv State Conservatory named after Mykola Lysenko, majoring in concert performance and pedagogy. In 1971 he transferred to the Komitas State Conservatory of Yerevan, graduating with highest honors in 1974 and completing his postgraduate studies in 1977 under Anna Ambakumyan, again specializing in concert performance and teaching.

Gurgenov's repertoire centered on the Classical and Romantic masters — Mozart, Beethoven, Chopin and Schumann — while also embracing key 20th-century composers such as Prokofiev, Scriabin and Shostakovich.

Still a student, he won Second Prize and the Laureate title at the 1972 Trans-Caucasus Piano Competition. Until 1976 he simultaneously taught the professional piano curriculum at the Yerevan Music-Pedagogical College. Beginning in 1974 he served as accompanist, in 1976 became assistant for the professional piano course in Ambakumyan's studio, was appointed lecturer in accompaniment studies in 1978, and from 1980 led his own professional class.

Alongside his teaching, Gurgenov was an active performer, touring in Germany, Poland, Georgia, Russia and beyond. Fascinated by the exact sciences, he also completed a two-year theoretical and practical course in computer technology at the Yerevan Polytechnic Institute in 1986.

From 1994 he served as Vice-Dean of the Piano Faculty, and from 2002 headed the Conservatory's Second Department of Professional Piano. He sat on the juries of numerous competitions and produced significant scholarly, editorial and publishing work.

A distinguished pedagogue, Gurgenov carried forward the performance traditions of two great Russian piano schools – that of Felix Blumenfeld and that of Konstantin Igumnov. Many of his students continue to teach at the Yerevan State Conservatory, while performers such as Hayk Melikyan and Nareh Arghamanyan have earned international acclaim.

== Awards ==
- Trans-Caucasus Piano Competition: 2nd prize (1972).
- All-Ukrainian Piano Competitions award winner (1969–1971).

== About Gurgenov ==
In 1987 the composer Edgar Hovhannisyan wrote of him:

The playing of his students is marked by the highest professional standards and deep knowledge. He is constantly perfecting himself, frequently appearing with interpretations of works by contemporary Armenian composers. Gurgenov is kind and sympathetic, yet demanding—a specialist faithful to his noble vocation. In musical matters he is uncompromising, revealing each student's individuality and preferences through a personalised approach.
