= Nareh Arghamanyan =

Armenian pianist (born 1989)

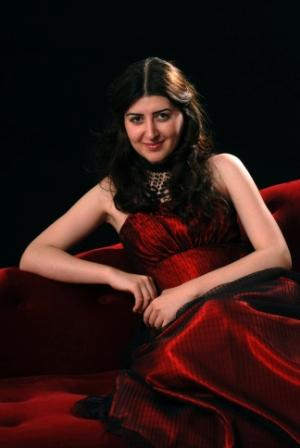
- Born: January 21, 1989 (age 37)
- Occupation: Classical pianist
- Website: arghamanyan.com

Nareh Arghamanyan (Armenian: Նարե Արղամանյան; born 1989) is an Armenian pianist. She won 2008 Montreal International Musical Competition.

== Early life ==
Arghamanyan was born in Vanadzor, Armenia in 1989. She began her piano studies at the age of five. At the age of eight, she entered the Tchaikovsky Music School for Talented Children in Yerevan, where she studied with Alexander Gurgenov. In 2004, she became the youngest student to be admitted to the University for Music and Performing Arts Vienna and studied with Heinz Medjimorec.

== Career ==
In 2008, Arghamanyan won the Montreal International Music Competition.

In 2009 and 2010, Arghamanyan performed in several cities throughout the United States, including Miami, Detroit, Minneapolis, Kansas City, San Juan, San Francisco, and Fresno.She also performed at the Frick Collection in New York City.

Arghamanyan has performed with the Mont Blanc Symphony France, the Moscow Chamber Orchestra, the Armenian Philharmonic, and the National Chamber Orchestra of Armenia.

Arghamanyan also performed with the Orchestre Metropolitan under Yannick Nézet-Séguin, the Vienna Symphony the Bregenz Festival 2011 under Xian Zhang, as well as the Vancouver Symphony with James Gaffigan.

Arghamanyan attended the Marlboro Festival in 2010 and 2011, as well as the Tanglewood music festival, Domaine Forget Quebec, the Festival International de Lanaudière and at the Festspiele Mecklenburg-Vorpommern. In 2006 she appeared in the Chamber Music San Francisco Music Series under the auspices of the Guzik Foundation. In 2004 she was a soloist with the Mont Blanc Symphony France in the Grieg Piano Concerto. Recitals in 2003 brought Ms. Arghamanyan to New York City, Los Angeles, Boston, and Washington DC, and in 2002, highlight engagements included those with the Moscow Chamber Orchestra, in Moscow, and with the National Chamber Orchestra of Armenia in Yerevan and Berlin.

She has made several recordings, including two for Pentatone, one with Liszt's two piano concertos, and another of piano pieces by Rachmaninov. She also recorded Rachmaninov's second piano sonata and Liszt's B minor piano sonata for Analekta.

== Awards ==
Arghamanyan has been the 1st Prize recipient at the 2007 Piano Campus International Competition in Pontoise, France and took the second Prize at the 2007 Jose Roca International Competition in Valencia, Spain. In 2005 she won the Josef Dichler Piano Competition in Vienna, and the following year was awarded a scholarship from the Herbert von Karajan Foundation. Her first major recognition came at the Gina Bachauer International Junior Piano Competition in Salt Lake City in 2000 where, at the age of 11, she was the 2nd Prize winner, predicted by critics to have “a major international career” and praised for her virtuosity and sense of artistry.

=== Competition prizes record ===
- 2009 “Sparkasse Wortersee” Competition in Austria, 1st prize.
- 2008 Montreal International Musical Competition, 1st prize.
- 2007 Piano Campus International piano competition, Pontoise, 1st prize.
- 2007 José Roca International piano competition, Valencia, 2nd prize.
- 2005 One-year scholarship award from the Herbert Von Karajan Foundation Vienna.
- 2005 Dr. Josef Dichler competition Austria, 1st prize.
- 2003 Seiler Piano Competition, Kitzingen|Germany, 4th prize.
- 2000 Gina Bachauer International Junior Piano Competition USA, 2nd prize.
- 1999 Armenian Legacy, First National piano competition Armenia, 1st prize.
- 1998 International Competition "Little Prince" for young talents in Zaporozhye, Ukraine, 1st prize.
- 1997 International Frédéric Chopin Piano Competition in Yugoslavia, 1st prize.

== Selected discography ==
- Piano Concertos by Serge Prokofiev and Aram Khachaturian. Nareh Arghamanyan, Alain Altinoglu, Rundfunk-Sinfonieorchester Berlin PENTATONE PTC 5186510 (2014).
- Creating Timeless Classics. Works by Robert Schumann, Peter Ilyich Tchaikovsky, Johann Sebastian Bach, Ludwig van Beethoven, Howard Blake. Martin Helmchen, Arabella Steinbacher, Nareh Arghamanyan, Mari Kodama, Julia Fischer, Russian National Orchestra, Concertgebouw Chamber Orchestra, Academy of St Martin in the Fields, Orchestre de la Suisse Romande. Pentatone PTC 5186531 (2014).
- Franz Liszt The 2 Piano Concertos - Totentanz - Fantasy on Hungarian Folk Tunes. Nareh Arghamanyan, Alain Altinoglu, Rundfunk-Sinfonieorchester Berlin. PENTATONE PTC 5186397 (2012)
- Sergei Rachmaninov - Piano Pieces. Nareh Arghamanyan. Pentatone PTC 5186399 (2012).
- Femmes de Légende. Works by Cécile Chaminade, Johanna Senfter, Anna Bon, Maria Szymanowska, Mel Bonis, Lili Boulanger, Nadia Boulanger, Ilse Fromm-Michaels, Else Schmitz-Gohr, Marianna Martines, Pauline Viardot, Louise Farrenc, Clara Schumann, and Fanny Mendelssohn. Nareh Arghamanyan. Hänssler HC25026 (2025).
