= Timofey Mayakin =

Military director and musician

Major General Timofey Mayakin
- имофей Маякин
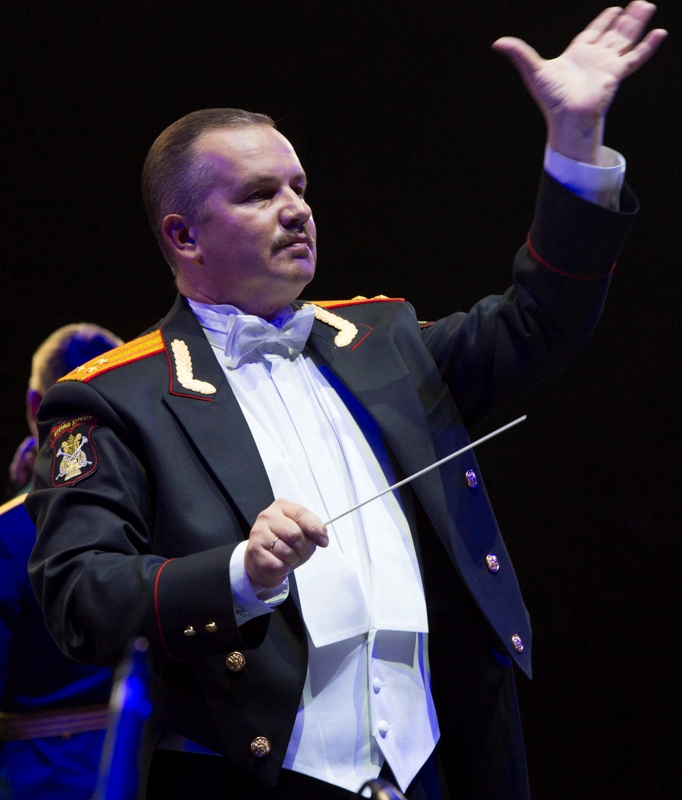
- Mayakin in 2017
- Born: Timofey Konstantinovich Mayakin; 21 March 1969 (age 57); Moscow, Russian SFSR, USSR
- Education: Moscow Conservatory; Military University of the Ministry of Defense
- Occupations: Military conductor, composer

Major General Timofey Konstantinovich Mayakin (Russian: Тимофей Константинович Маякин; born on 21 March 1969) is a Russian military conductor who is currently serving as the Senior Director of Music of the Military Band Service of the Armed Forces of Russia. Mayakin was appointed to this position in August 2016, following the retirement of Lieutenant General Valery Khalilov, who would also be killed in the Black Sea in December of that year.

== Early life and career ==
He was born in Moscow in 1969. In his early childhood, he lived near a music school, where he would later be sent at 5 years old to participate in a violin class. In the early 80s, his mother brought home a newspaper with an article about the Moscow Military Music College, which he wanted to be enrolled in. His father however, who was an engineer in the Soviet Army, was hesitant to allow Mayakin to join, as he did not think he wanted to become a military musician. After graduating from the school in 1987, he enrolled in the military department of the Moscow Conservatory and later the Military University of the Ministry of Defense of Russia, graduating with honors from both institutions. After the attaining the rank of lieutenant, he was sent to Khabarovsk with his wife and two-year-old daughter, where he worked under the Alexander Pakhomov, who was the first director of bands in the Khabarovsk Garrison.

== Higher positions ==
In 2002 he was transferred to Moscow and by 2009, he was the deputy director of the Military Band Service. In August 2016 by order of President Vladimir Putin he was promoted to the post of head of the Military Band Service and director of music. His first major event since becoming director of music was conducting the massed bands during the Moscow Victory Day Parade on 9 May 2017. A year later, he became the music director of the Spasskaya Tower Military Music Festival and Tattoo.

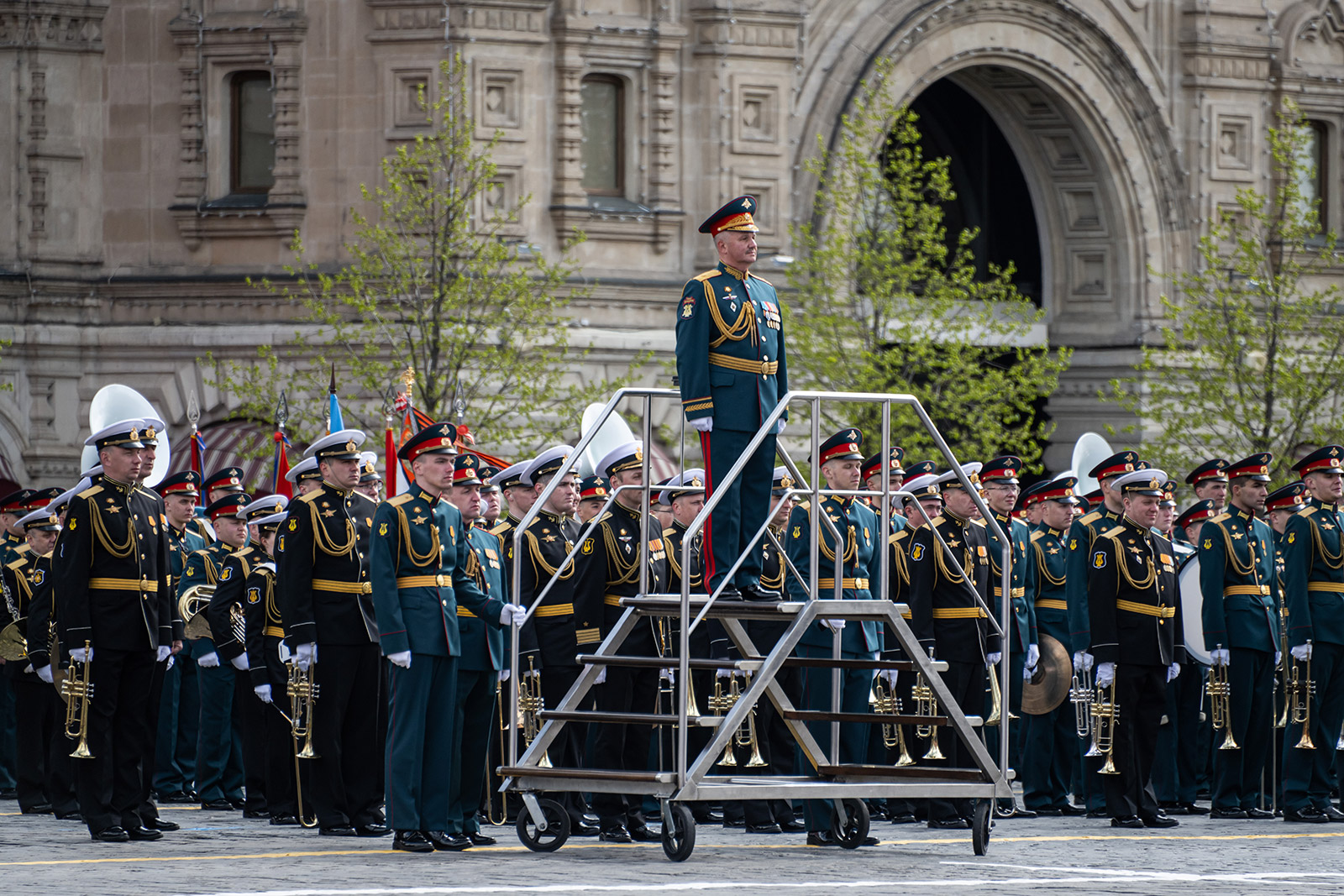
Mayakin at the 2022 Moscow Victory Day Parade.

Political offices
Preceded by Valery Khalilov	Senior Director of Music of the Military Band Service of the Armed Forces; 2016 – Present	Incumbent
