= Armen Poghosyan (military musician) =

Military director and musician

Colonel Armen Poghosyan
- Արմեն Պողոսյան
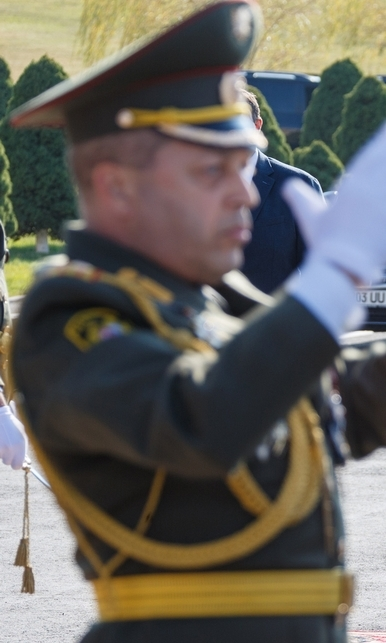
- Poghosyan in October 2019.
- Born: Armen Karleni Poghosyan; April 19, 1965 (age 61); Yerevan, Armenian SSR, Soviet Union
- Military career
- Allegiance: USSR; Armenia
- Branch: Soviet Army; Armenia Armed Forces
- Service years: 1990-2022
- Rank: Colonel
- Commands: Military Band Division of the General Staff

Colonel Armen Karleni Poghosyan (Note: Russified as Armen Karlenovich Poghosyan (Армен Карленович Погосян)) (Armenian: Արմեն Կարլենի Պողոսյան) is a Soviet-educated Armenian military musician. From 16 February 2002 to 2022, he was the Senior Military Director of the Band of the General Staff of the Armed Forces of Armenia and concurrently the commander of the Military Band Division of the General Staff. He is also a teacher at the Komitas State Conservatory of Yerevan.

== Early life and career ==
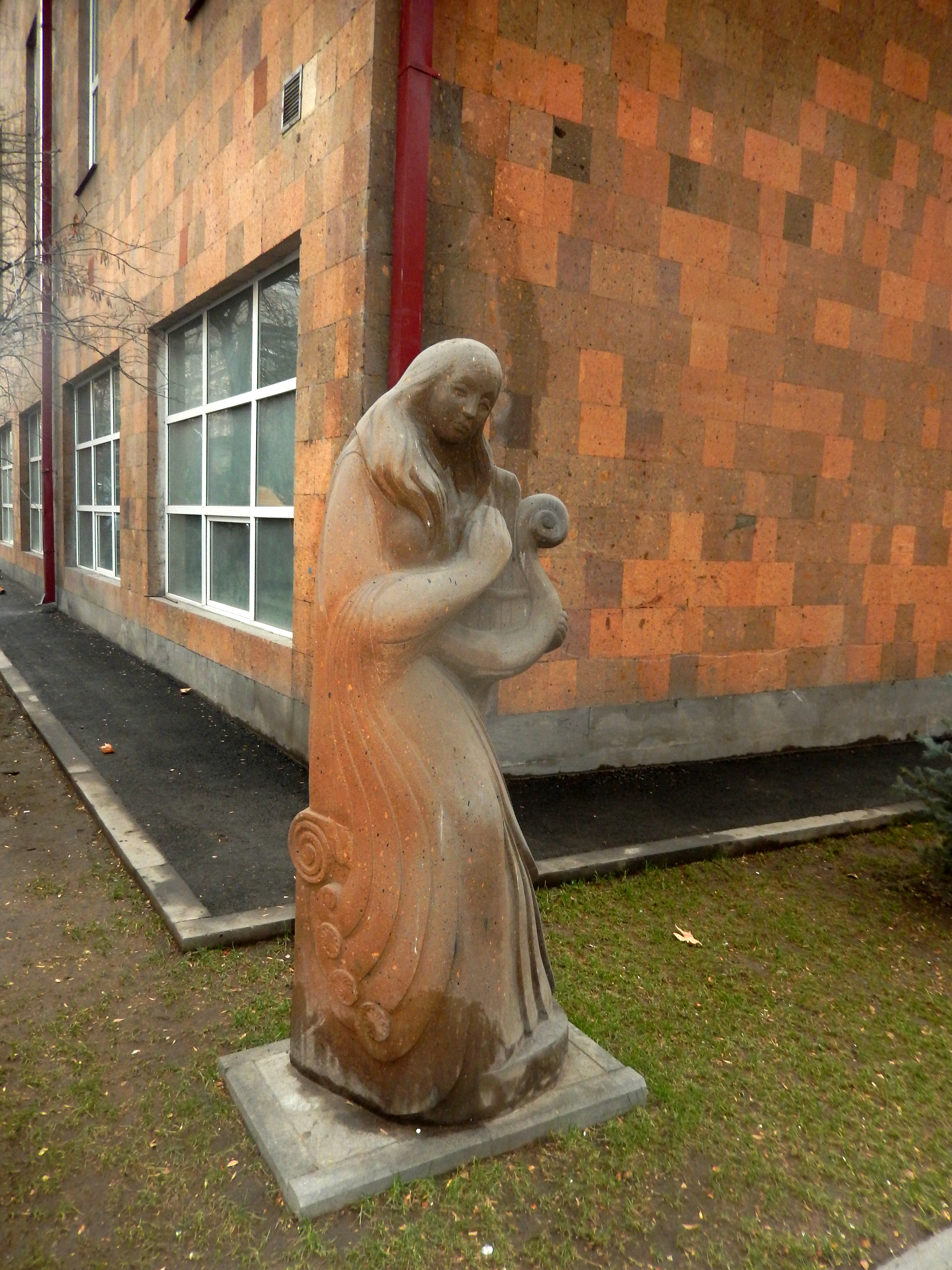
A monument at the Tchaikovsky Secondary Music School in Yerevan, where Poghosyan was a student from 1972 to 1980.

Poghosyan was born in Yerevan on 19 April 1965. He was the first musician in his family, with his mother and father being veteran engineers and his brother being in that field currently. He studied at the Tchaikovsky Secondary Music School in the capital for 8 years. In 1984, he graduated from the Musical College named after Romanos Melikian. After graduating from the college, he worked as an orchestra artist at the Yerevan Opera Theatre.

From 1985 to 1990, Poghosyan completed his studies at the Department of Military Conductors of the Moscow Conservatory where he received his certification as a military conductor. In 1990, he joined the Soviet Armed Forces becoming an official conductor for the bands of the Transcaucasian Military District. In 1992, he resigned from his position in the Soviet Army, and was invited to lead the newly formed Band of the General Staff of the Armed Forces of Armenia. He served in various leadership positions in the band until 16 February 2002, when he became the Commander and the Senior Military Director of the band division.

On 25 February 2021, he was one of 40 top Armenian officers who signed a statement drafted by Chief of the General Staff Onik Gasparyan calling for the resignation of Prime Minister Nikol Pashinyan. The following year, he retired from the armed forces. Since 2022, he has been associate professor at the Faculty of Music of the Khachatur Abovyan State Pedagogical University.

== Reputation ==
External videos
- Poghosyan's interview with Armenian Public Broadcasting
- Armen Poghosyan - Elir i zen

He is one of the few military officers to hold the title of Honored Artist of Armenia. He is commonly known for leading the band of the general staff during the parades on Republic Square in honor of the 5th, 8th, 15th, 20th, and 25th anniversaries of the Independence of Armenia, as well as the 100th anniversary of the founding of the First Armenian Republic. He also leads the band during Spasskaya Tower Military Music Festival and Tattoo on Red Square in Moscow in 2017. In 2013, Belarusian President Alexander Lukashenko thanked and praised Poghosyan during his state visit to Yerevan for what he considered a very good performance of the Belarusian Anthem (My Belarusy), telling Poghosyan as he inspected the honor guard:

“I have never heard our anthem played so well"

He authored many official marches, including the song "I have the honor" and "Adagio".

== Awards ==
- Medal of Marshal Baghramyan
- Gold Medal of the Mayor of Yerevan
- Presidential Gratitude Diploma (awarded by President Serzh Sargsyan)
- Medal "For Services to the Fatherland", 1st Degree
- Nikolai Rimsky-Korsakov Medal (Military Band Service of the Armed Forces of Russia)

== See also ==
- Semyon Tchernetsky
- Valery Khalilov
- John Philip Sousa
