= Else Schmitz-Gohr =

German pianist (1901–1987)

Else Schmitz-Gohr (12 August 1901 – 13 December 1987) was a German composer, pianist, and teacher who is best remembered for her Elegy for the Left Hand for piano, her successful students, and her recordings of Max Reger's works for piano.

Schmitz-Gohr was born in Cologne. She studied at the Cologne Conservatory and the Stern Conservatory in Berlin. Her teachers included Franz Bolsche, Wilhelm Klatte, Dr. Otto Klauwell, James Kwast, and Fritz Hans Rehbold. She socialized with sculptor Lili Graf. In 1918, she debuted as a pianist under conductor Hermann Abendroth, and in 1922 won the Gustav Hollaender medal.

Schmitz-Gohr toured throughout Germany and abroad as a pianist. She was known for her interpretation of modern composers, especially Max Reger, whose works she recorded commercially on LP KAS 30067 (Kaskade). She taught at the Rheinische Musikschule, the State Academy of Music in Cologne, and the Stern Conservatory. Her students included Dietmar von Capitaine, York Höller, Bernhard Klee, Aloys and Alfons Kontarsky, Georg Kroll, Irene Vogel Osiander, Erika Rademacher, Eckart Sellheim, and Joachim Volkmann.

Nareh Arghamanyan recorded works by Schmitz-Gohr on her album Femmes de Légende Hänssler HC25026 (2025).

== Compositions ==
Schmitz-Gohr's compositions were published by Schott Music. They included:

=== Chamber ===
- Allegro in G minor (violin and piano)
- Allegro Moderato in E minor (piano trio)
- Andante in G minor (piano trio)
- Kleine Flöten-Duette (two flutes)

=== Orchestra ===
- Overture in G minor

=== Piano ===
- Elegy for the Left Hand
- Fantasie in F major
- Suite

== Recordings ==
- Elegie for the left hand by Else Schmitz-Gohr, performed by Christina Petrowska Quilico on YouTube
- Else Schmitz-Gohr plays Reger "Variations and Fugue on a Theme of Telemann" Op. 134 (1974) Remaster on YouTube
