= Anahit Nersesyan =

Anahit Nersesyan (In Armenian: Անահիտ Ներսիսյան, по-русски: Анаит Нерсесян), a famous Armenian pianist was born in 1954 in Yerevan. She studied at the Tchaikovsky Music School, Yerevan from 1961 to 1972 with Professor E. Voskanyan. Continued education at the Moscow State Conservatory, the class of Professor V. Merzhanov, from 1972 to 1977. Got post-graduate education in piano. Since 1977 has been teaching at the piano department of the Yerevan State Komitas Conservatory. Participated in the international competitions and festivals: VI International Johann Sebastian Bach Competition (1980, First Prize and Golden Medal, Germany), J.S. Bach 300th Anniversary Festival (1984, Germany). Had master classes at Karol Lipiński University of Music in Wrocław (1985, Poland), Tokyo College of Music (1994–95, Japan). Was the member of international juries: J.S. Bach International Competition in Saarbrücken (1992, Germany), Rachmaninov International Competition (1994, 1995, 2004, 2008, Russia). Had numerous recitals in Germany, France, Canada, Finland, Hungary, Austria, Japan, Baltic countries, USA and Poland. Performed with conductors Khanjian, Tjeknavorian, Manino (Italy), van Tristen (Netherlands), Koch, Emin Khachaturian. She many times appeared with the Komitas Quartet.

Meritorious Artist of Armenia in 2007, she currently is a professor of the Yerevan State Komitas Conservatory.

Her albums were popular in USSR, Germany and Japan, where she toured numerous times. She had releases at the Melodiya, and Altus. Information about her is also available at the Classical Musical Archives.

Honored Artist of Armenia (2007). Jury member of the Balakirev International Competition (Krasnodar) (2014). Participation in the International Festival Week of the world Conservatory (St. Petersburg) (2014). Jury Member of the international competition "Minsk 2014" (Belarus) (2014). Participation in the festival dedicated to the 95th anniversary of the birth of V.Merzhanov (Moscow, Tambov) (2014). Participation at the international festival T.Shebanova's memory. (2015). Solo concerts dedicated to the 100th anniversary of the Armenian Genocide (Germany) (2015). Concert dedicated to the 175th anniversary of the birth of P. Tchaikovsky (Armenia, Yerevan) (2015). Master classes - in Conservatory of Rimsky-Korsakov (St. Petersburg), Poland, Sanok, Krasnodar. (2015) Special Guest Professor, Tokyo University of Arts Geidai (Japan) (2018) Honorary Award of the Armenian Embassy of Japan (Tokyo) (2018)

== Recordings ==
LPs

- Samuil Feinberg, Sonata No 10, 1980, Melodiya, USSR
- Anahit Nersesyan plays J.S. Bach, 1981, Melodiya, USSR
- Gagik Hovunts, Sonata No 2, 1983, Melodiya, USSR
- Anahit Nersesyan plays Shostakovich, 1984, Melodiya, USSR

CDs

- Anahit Nersesyan plays Armenian Composers, 1994, USA
- Nordic Music for the Violin (with Megumi Ogata – violin), 2001, Altus, Japan
- Anahit Nersesyan plays Various program, 2005, Armenia
- Anahit Nersesyan - Pieces for Piano/Georgi Sarajyan, 2011 Armenia
- Anahit Nersesyan - Piano Pieces of Armenian Composers for Young Musicians/Part 1, 2012 Armenia
- Anahit Nersesyan - Piano Pieces of Armenian Composers for Young Musicians/Part 2, 2013 Armenia
- Anahit Nersesyan, Lilit Zakaryan - Pieces for Two Pianos of Armenian Composers, 2014 Armenia
- Anahit Nersesyan - Piano Pieces of Armenian Composers for Young Musicians/Part 3, 2015 Armenia

== Critical appreciation ==
"Great scope, bright emotionality, noble taste, and perfect technical command are felt in her performance. I also wish to point to the rich timbre of sounding, characteristic of Nersesyan's execution".

Arno Babajanian (People's artist of USSR)
