= Erika Radermacher =

German pianist, soprano and composer (born 1936)

Erika Radermacher (born 16 April 1936) is a Swiss pianist, soprano and composer. She won prizes in Germany and Austria for her piano performances, including the Mozart Prize, the Austrian State Prize and the Beethoven Competition prize, and played throughout Europe. She taught at the Conservatory of Music in Bern, and at the Bern University of Arts, and sang with the Ensemble Neue Horizonte. Some of her works have been recorded by Swiss radio. Radermacher has also taught in Bulgaria.

== Biography ==
Erika Radermacher was born in Eschweiler, near Aachen, in Germany on 16 April 1936. She studied music with Else Schmitz-Gohr in Cologne, Bruno Seidlhofer in Vienna and voice with Sylvia Gähwiller in Zurich. After completing her studies, she won major prizes in Germany and Austria for her piano performance, and went on to perform as a soloist and chamber musician in Europe.

Radermacher married Swiss composer Urs Peter Schneider and settled in Bern and Biel, where she taught piano at the Conservatory of Music in Bern and sang as a soprano with the Ensemble Neue Horizonte in Bern. She was a founding member of the Ensemble. After 1970 she became more interested in composition. Some of her works have been recorded by Swiss radio.

She works as a lecturer in piano at the Bern University of Arts and also teaches piano, theory and improvisation in Sofia, Bulgaria. In 1983 Radermacher and Schneider won the Bernese music prize.

== Honors and awards ==
- Two prizes, BAT competition for new chamber music, 1982
- Music Prize of the Canton of Bern, 1983 (with Schneider)
- Prize of the German Culture Industry Group
- First Prize in the Summer Academy in Salzburg
- Beethoven Competition prize in Vienna
- Mozart Prize in Dortmund
- Austrian State Prize, 1963

== Discography ==
Radermaker's work has been recorded and issued on CD, including:

- Robert Walser in der Schweizer Musik (Musiques Suisses Nr. 6231, 2005) Artists: Schneider, Urs Peter; Rader, Erika
- Historic Recordings 1968-1998, New Horizons Ensemble (music scene in Switzerland - Grammont Portrait No. CTS-M 76, 2002) Artists:

Ensemble Neue Horizonte Bern

- Urs Peter Schneider (Edition Wandelweiser Records No. 101, 2001) Artists: Schneider, Urs Peter; Rader, Erika
- Im Innern das Zitat, Improvisationen (Deputy / asm / Records Unit No. 012 / UTR4132, 2000) Artists: Rader, Erika; Weber, Katharina
