= Tchaikovsky Music School, Yerevan =

Tchaikovsky Music School
- Չայկովսկու անվան երաժշտական դպրոց
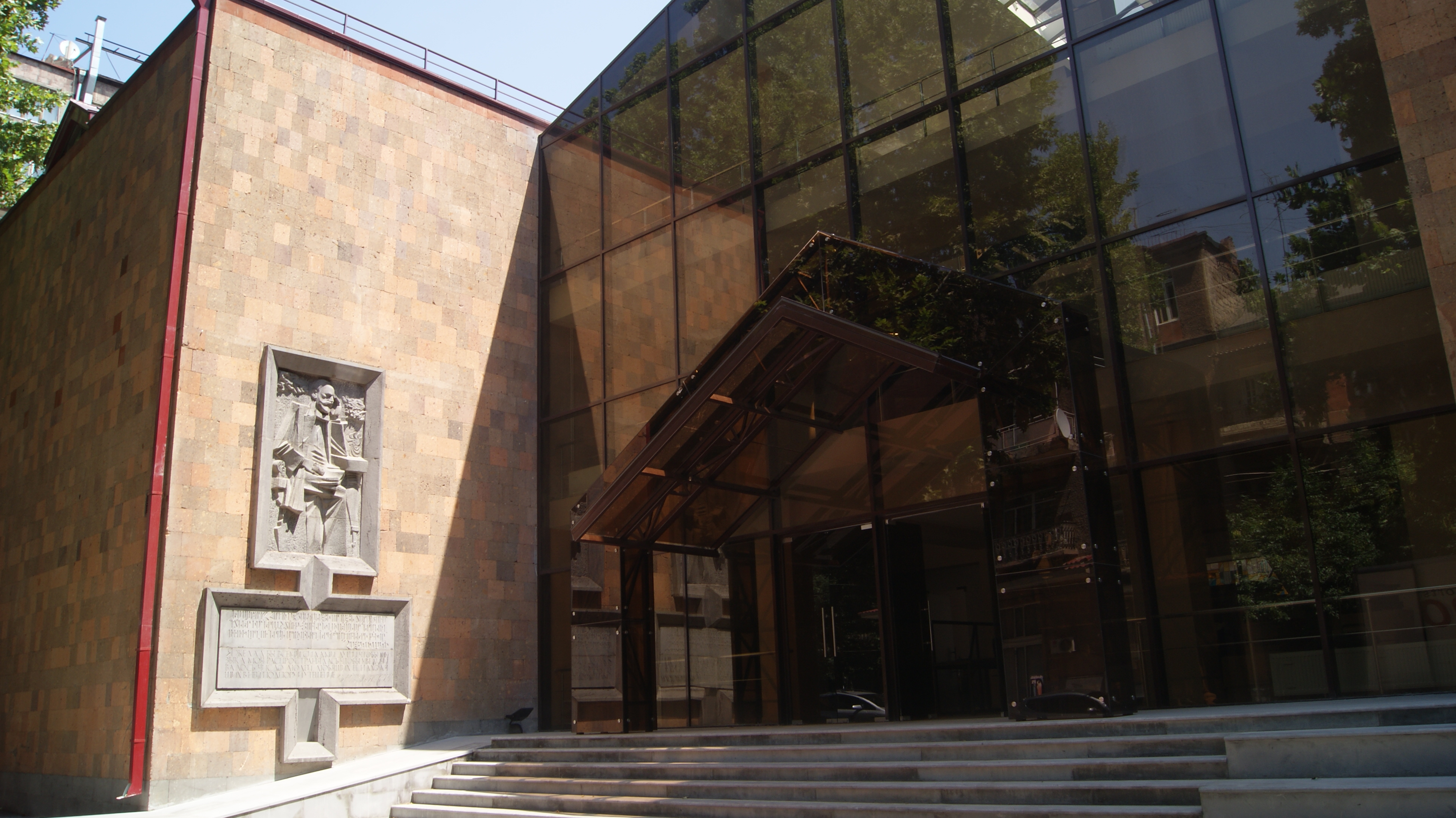
- The entrance to the school

Location
- 36 Agatangeghos Street, Kentron District; Yerevan; Armenia; 40.1824°N 44.5123°E

Information
- School type: Secondary School
- Established: 19 April 1939; 87 years ago
- Principal: Martin Kostandyan
- Grades: 5-12
- Enrollment: 600-665
- Language: Armenian, Russian

The Tchaikovsky Secondary Music School (Armenian: Երևանի Չայկովսկու անվան երաժշտական դպրոց), is a secondary school in Yerevan, Armenia which opened in 1939. The school is a specialized secondary school where a total of 600 students are enrolled in a 12-year education, while at the same time receiving 2 certificates of general and vocational education. Over 70 percent of the school's alumni attend the Komitas State Conservatory of Yerevan.

== History and organization ==
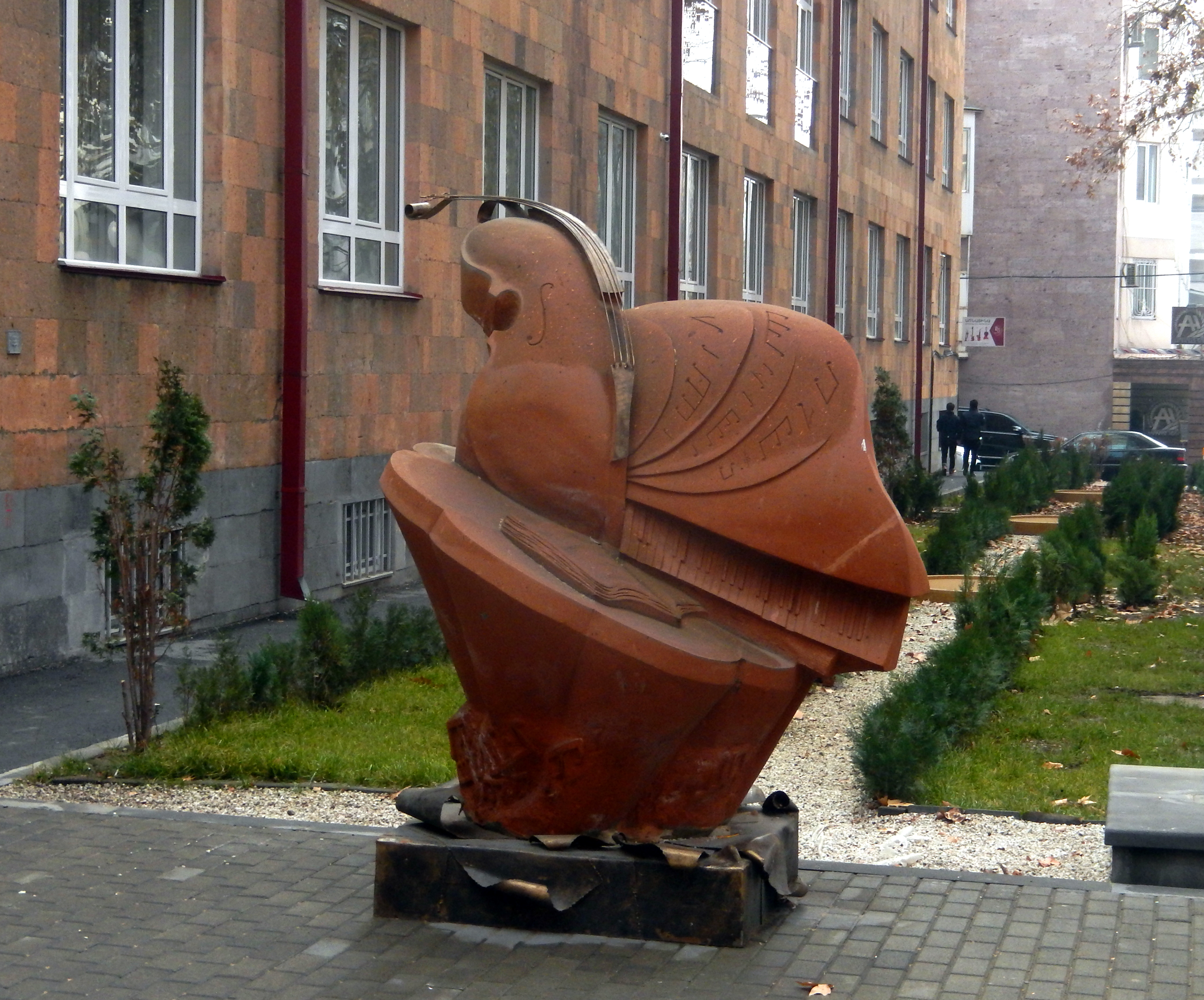
A monument outside the school

The school was founded on April 19, 1939, and two years later it was named after Pyotr Ilyich Tchaikovsky. Until 1975, 665 graduates have been awarded. In 1982, A sculpture of Tchaikovsky (made by architects Yervand Goghabashyan, and Jim Torosyan) was erected on the front of the school building. Since Armenian independence, the school has been renovated under the auspices of the Hayastan All-Armenian Fund.

It is up of piano, violin, cello, viola, contrabass, harp, brass and musical education departments. Besides the school's main curriculum, the school has a children's choir, an orchestra, and a band (which is made up of smaller symphonic, jazz, and brass bands).

== Layout of the building ==
The central building has been completely upgraded and replenished with stalls, the gym has been reconstructed, the concert hall has a playground, comfortable conditions have been created for musicians and spectators. Special rooms were built for the school's symphonic, jazz, and brass band, the violin ensemble, and the choir.

== Notable alumni ==
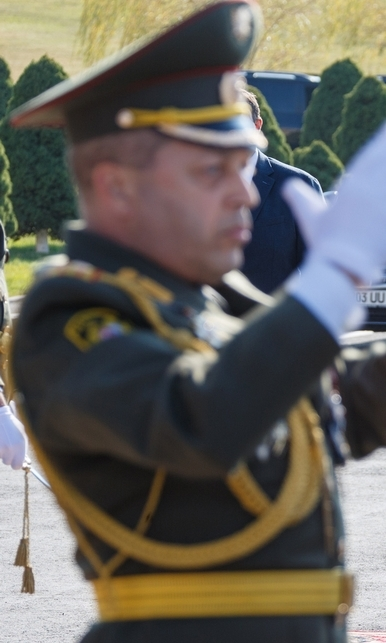
Colonel Armen Poghosyan, Senior Military Director of the Band of the General Staff of the Armed Forces of Armenia.

- Anahit Nersesyan
- Ara Torosyan
- Araksi Sarian-Harutunian
- Geghuni Chitchian
- Jean Ter-Merguerian
- Medea Abrahamyan
- Ruben Aharonyan
- Vahagn Hayrapetyan
- Sofya Melikyan
- Tigran Hamasyan
- Armen Poghosyan

== See also ==
- Education in Armenia
- Mkhitar Sebastatsi Educational Complex
- List of Armenian schools
