= Hayk Melikyan =

Armenian pianist and composer (born 1980)

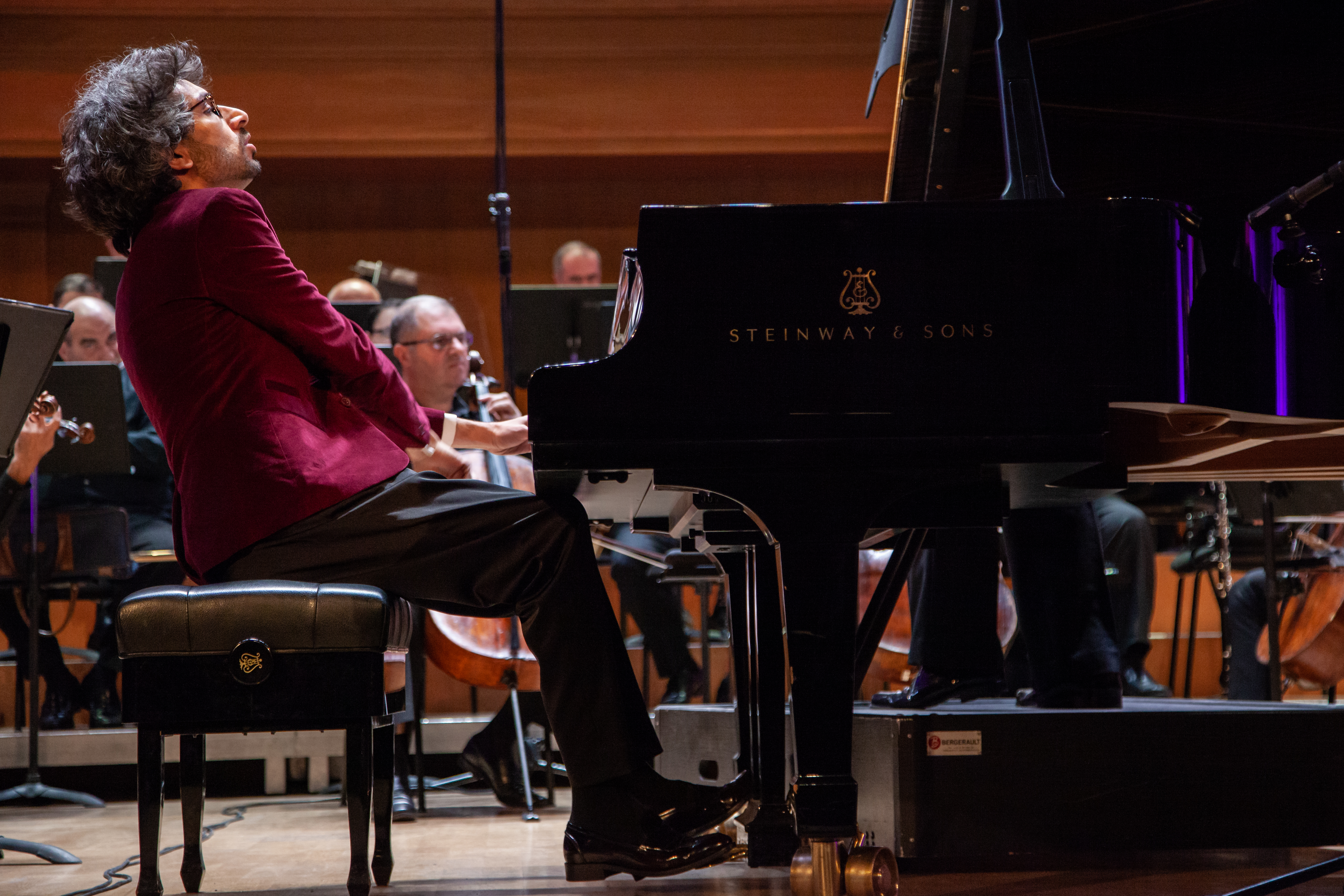
- Hayk Melikyan playing Arvo Pärt's Lamentate for piano and orchestra. Armenian premiere with the Armenian National Philharmonic Orchestra. Conductor: Ruben Asatryan. 16.11.2018

Background information
- Born: November 29, 1980 (age 45); Yerevan, Armenian SSR, USSR
- Genres: Classical
- Occupation: Pianist
- Instrument: Piano

Hayk Melikyan (Armenian: Հայկ Մելիքյան; born November 29, 1980, in Yerevan) is an Armenian pianist and composer. He is widely known as one of the best performers of 20th century and contemporary classical music.

== Life and career ==
Melikyan was born in Yerevan. He is the grandson of renowned poet, translator and publicist Sokrat Khanyan.

He started playing piano when he was six with Irina Grishinskaya. Later he continued his professional studies with Professor Alexander Gurgenov at the Yerevan Komitas Conservatory, where he also studied composition with Vartan Adjemian. Hayk Melikyan’s international concert début took place at the Concerto di Concerti International Festival of the 20th Century Music in Rome in 2000.

Melikyan regularly performs on prestigious stages of the world including Gulbenkian Grand Auditorium (Lisbon), Victoria Hall (Geneva), Megaron (Athens), etc.

In 2009, Hayk Melikyan initiated a series of concerts called 1900+, dedicated to 20th-century and contemporary world piano music. In 2020, Hayk Melikyan launched a new initiative named 2000+, which aims to propagate the music of exclusively our time.

Melikyan’s compositional catalogue includes solo piano, chamber, vocal, and symphonic works, alongside piano transcriptions, concert paraphrases, and arrangements. His music is published by BabelScores.

== Discography ==
By AZURE SKY Records:

- 2026։ Baroque + Forth, Baroque Masterpieces Transcribed for Solo Piano
- 2025: Laudamus, George Gurdjieff, Thomas de Hartmann, Secular and Sacred Piano Works
- 2025: Bach + Forth, Sacred & Secular Keyboard Transcriptions

By NAXOS Records:

- 2020: An Armenian Palette
- 2017: Arutiunian: Complete Piano Works
- 2014: Babdjanian, Complete Original Works for Piano Solo

== Awards ==
- IBLA Grand Prize International Piano Competition: Special prize (Ragusa, Italy, 1999).
- Valentino Bucchi International Piano Competition of Twentieth Century and Contemporary Music: 2nd prize (Rome, Italy, 2000).
- Yvar Mikhashoff Trust for New Music (Buffalo, United States, 2012).
- Orléans International Piano Competition: Samson François prize (Orléans, France, 2008).
- Lazar Saryan Composers Competition: 1st prize (Yerevan, Armenia, 2008).
- Orléans International Piano Competition: André Boucourechliev prize (Orléans, France, 2012).
- Gold Medal of Moscow Composers Union: for his contribution and promotion of the World Contemporary Music (Moscow, Russia, 2012).
- Honorary Artist of Armenia (2013) on the occasion of the Republic Day.
- Hayk Melikyan's solo album «Arutiuanian: Complete Piano Works» by NAXOS Grand Piano label was selected as The Best Classical Music Album of the Year within the Swallow Music Awards (2018).
- In 2024, Hayk Melikyan was honored with the Golden Medal of the Armenian Ministry of Science, Education, Culture, and Sports upon the 15th anniversary of 1900+.
- Movses Khorenatsi Medal (2025) on the occasion of Independence Day, for outstanding services to the fatherland and dedication.

== Quotes ==
- Barry Brenesal (Fanfare Magazine):

Hayk Melikyan has power and agility to spare, with plenty of attention to inner voicings. He is never at a loss for style or direction in any of this music, which is pretty impressive when you consider that it really represents two very different styles.

- Maureen Buja (Interlude.hk):

Melikyan, in his performance, adds elements of free improvisation, expressing in a unique way everything that Bach brought to music.

- BBC Music Magazine:

Hayk Melikyan is a Musical Hero for his promotion of contemporary music.

== Links ==
- Official Website
- Hayk Melikyan at the Armenian National Music website
- NAXOS E-Card
- Hayk Melikyan's channel on YouTube
- Hayk Melikyan on BabelScores
- Hayk Melikyan on Azure Sky Records
- Hayk Melikyan on Spotify
