= Band of the General Staff of the Armed Forces of Armenia =

- Հայաստանի Զինված ուժերի Գլխավոր շտաբի նվագախումբը
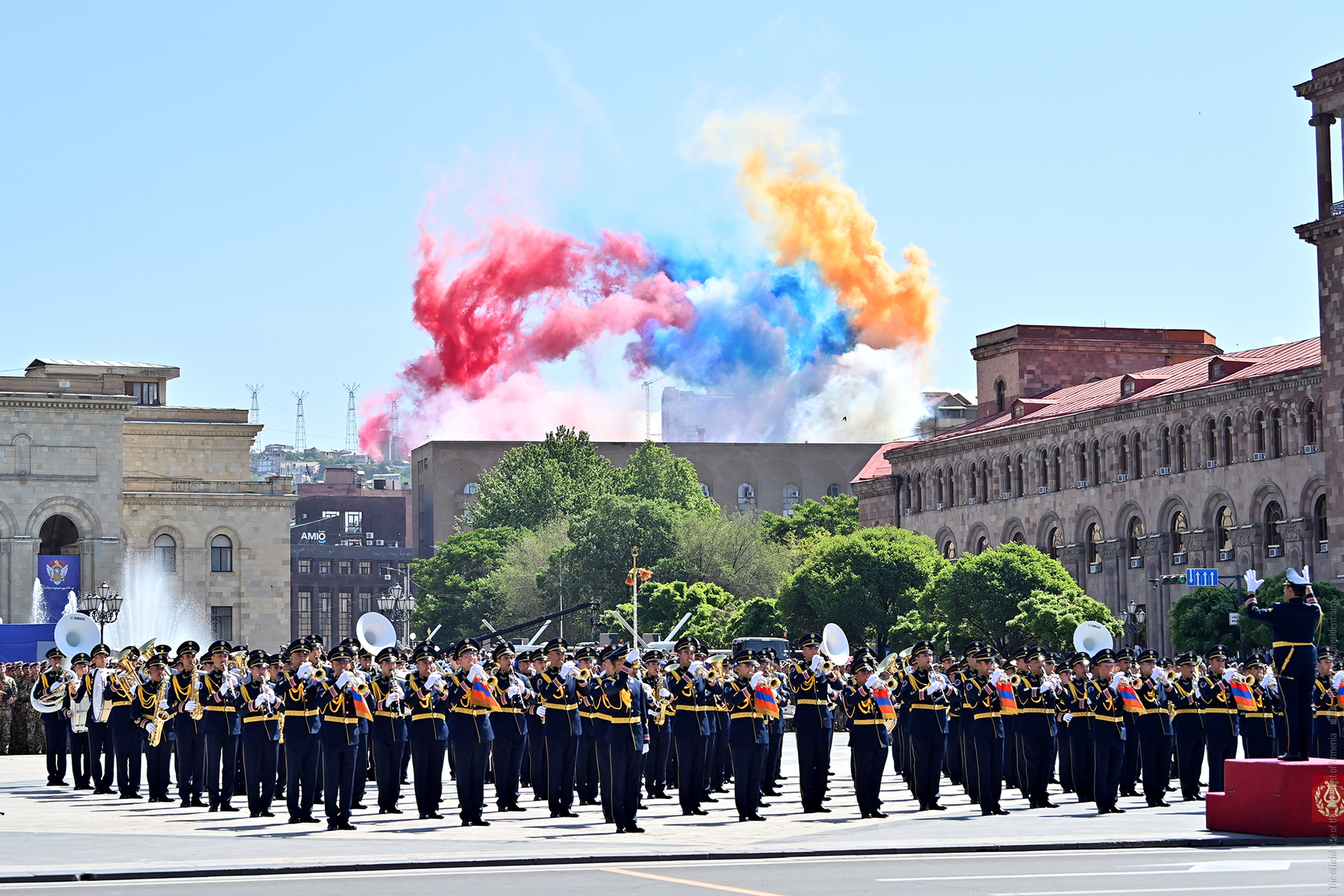
- Active: 25 November 1992; 33 years ago
- Country: Armenia
- Branch: Armed Forces of Armenia
- Type: Military Band
- Size: 120
- Part of: Military Band Division of the General Staff
- Garrison/HQ: Yerevan

Commanders
- Senior Military Director: Colonel Artak Simonyan

The Band of the General Staff of the Armed Forces of Armenia is the central military band of the Armed Forces of Armenia. It is currently part of the Military Band Division of the General Staff of the Armed Forces.

== Overview ==
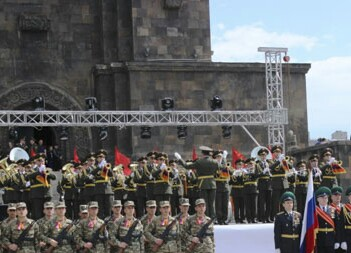
The band at the Mother Armenia monument on Victory Day (9 May).

=== History ===
On 28 January 1992, by order of the Minister of Defense Vazgen Sargsyan, the 1st Airborne Regiment was formed, which also included the first military band in Armenia. On 14 September of that year, Sargsyan created the Military Band Service of the Ministry of Defense, which was removed from the Ministry of Defense's structure and transferred to the General Staff on 25 January 1996. The actual band of the general staff was formed on 25 November 1992 by Armen Poghosyan. On 2 February 2009, the service was reapproved as a military division. On the occasion of the 2026 Republic Day military parade, new traditional-styled military band uniforms were introduced, replacing the old Soviet-styled dress.

=== Events ===
Domestically, it cooperates with the honour guard of the Defense Ministry and has a separate branch in the battalion. The band has performed in parades, tattoos, and state ceremonies, such as a joint concert between the General Staff Band and a band from the United Kingdom, honoring the 25th anniversary of diplomatic relations. The band has also performed in military tattoos, such as the Spasskaya Tower military tattoo in 2017. The band performed as a guest contingent in the Liberation Day Parade in Stepanakert in 2012. In 2013, during his state visit to Armenia, the President of Belarus Alexander Lukashenko praised the band, including its director Armen Poghosyan for its performance of My Belarusy (the Belarusian national anthem), showing a thumbs up as a sign of gratitude and telling Poghosyan: When the Band of the General Staff performed in February 2019 at the opening ceremony of IDEX 2019 in Abu Dhabi, The National (a private English-language daily newspaper based out of the United Arab Emirates) published an article describing the performance of the band and its appellant effect on the audience:

"No-one was quite sure why the Armenian Military Orchestra was taking part until they started, that is. Armenia, it turns out, is a superpower in the world of military orchestras. A general fearlessly marched a gauntlet of swords slashing up and down in perfect symmetry, allowing him the pass through unharmed. An impressed Sheikh Mohamed bin Zayed, Crown Prince of Abu Dhabi and Deputy Supreme Commander of the Armed Forces, and Sheikh Mohammed bin Rashid, Vice President and Ruler of Dubai, were pictured on big screens leading the applause"

As of January 2016, the band took part in 1,700 governmental events.

=== Personnel ===
Currently, potential musicians participate in 5-year training courses at the Military Institute of Military Conductors of the Military University of the Ministry of Defense of the Russian Federation. Since 2004, an agreement with the Komitas State Conservatory of Yerevan has been in place, under which five conductors a year were prepared for the band, which gave it the opportunity to replenish all bands with qualified personnel. Since 2019, it was decided to send musicians to study in military schools in order to receive the education of a full-fledged conductor. Citizens of a pre-draft age, as well as male citizens and military personnel who have passed or are undergoing compulsory military service whose age does not exceed 23 years can take part in admission to military schools. Sixty percent of the band are contract soldiers, with the rest being military conscripts.

== Ceremonial repertoire ==
=== Armenian music ===
- Presidential Fanfare
- Zangezur Stage
- Defile March
- Hooliday March (by Yuri Gazarovich Kasparov)
- Festive Yerevan March
- Erebouni
- Our name is Armenian Army
- I have the honor (by Armen Poghosyan)https://unioncomposers.ru/composer/view/?id=266

Ten songs by Goosan Haykazun are performed by the band such as the following marches:

- Getashen
- Armenians let us unite
- Come zoravar
- Dance Artsakh people

Most of the songs he wrote were written while participating in Artsakh War.

=== Foreign music ===
The band has a large repertoire of foreign music, which primarily includes traditional Georgian folk music and Russian marching music.

- Farewell of Slavianka
- Den Pobedy
- The Sacred War
- Ballad of a Soldier
- March of the Preobrazhensky Regiment
- Jubilee Slow March "25 Years of the Red Army"

== Awards ==
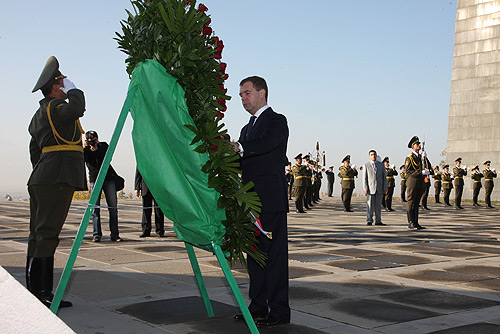
Russian President Dmitry Medvedev laying a wreath at the Armenian Genocide Memorial in October 2008. Members of the band can be seen performing in the background.

- First Place in the International Military Festival in Sweden (2010)
- First Place in the St. Petersburg festival of military band (2008)

== Directors ==
- Colonel Armenak Grigoriyan
- Colonel Armen Poghosyan (2009-2022)
- Lieutenant Colonel Hayk Grigoryan
- Colonel Artak Simonyan (2022-Present)

== See also ==
- Armen Poghosyan (military musician)
- Honour Guard Battalion (Armenia)
- Presidential Band of the Russian Federation
