= Geghuni Chitchyan =

Armenian composer

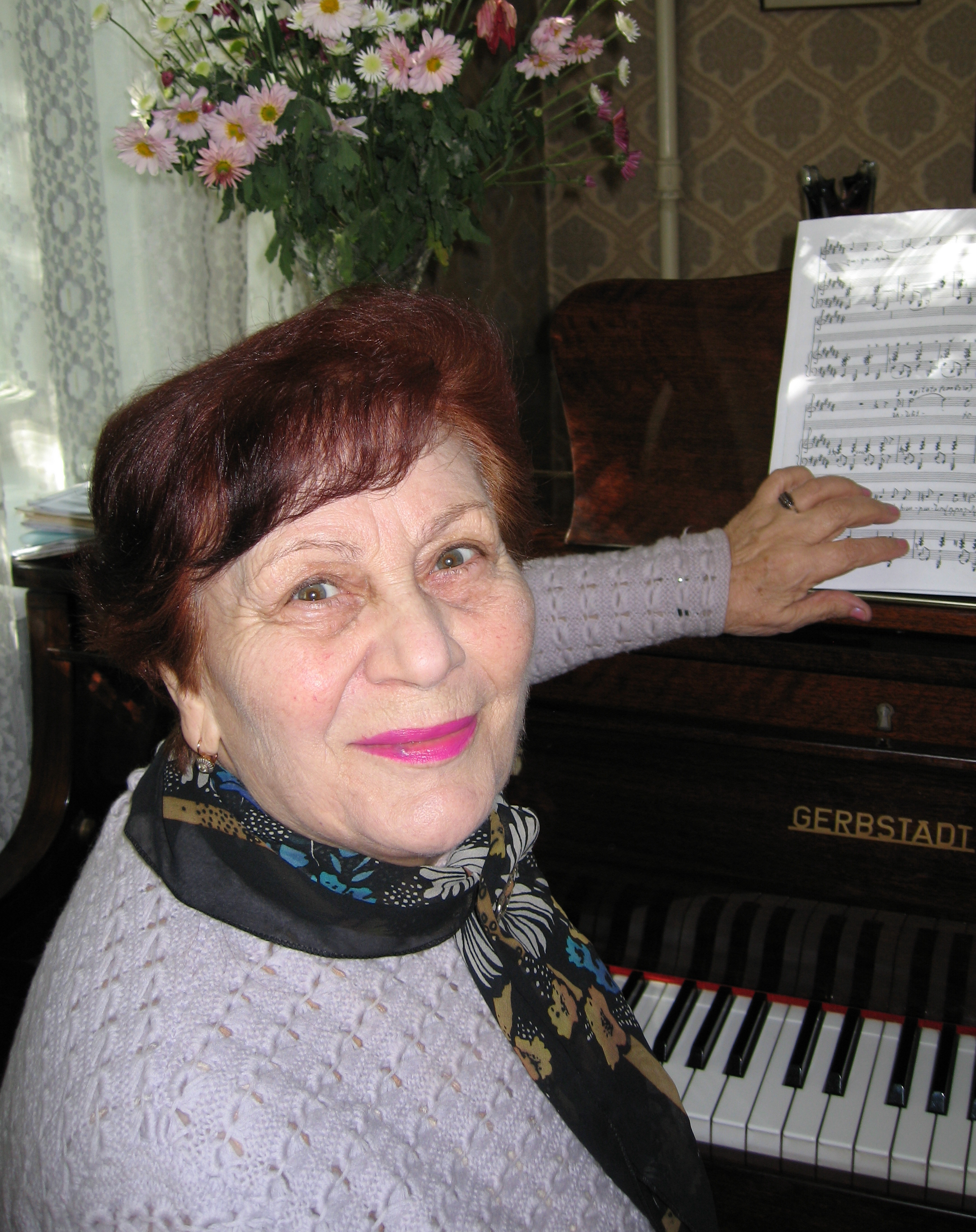
- Geghuni Chitchyan in 2006

Background information
- Born: Geghuni Chitchyan; August 30, 1929 (age 97); Leninakan, Armenian SSR, Soviet Union (now Gyumri, Armenia)
- Genre: Classical music
- Occupations: Composer, pianist, educator

Geghuni Chitchyan or Chitchian (Armenian: Գեղունի Հովհաննեսի Չթչյան; Russian: Гегуни Оганесовна Читчян, romanized: tr, lit. 'Geguni Oganesovna Chitchyan'; born 30 August 1929) is an Armenian composer, pianist, and pedagogue. Her parents were veteran teachers; her brother, Henrikh, an established violinist.

== Biography ==
Chitchyan was born on 30 August 1929 in Leninakan (now Gyumri). While attending the Tigranian Elementary School of Music, she began composing. At the age of ten she had already a published song. In 1940, she entered the Tchaikovsky Music School in Yerevan to study piano and composition. She continued her studies in composition with Grigor Yeghiazaryan from 1947 to 1953 at the Yerevan Komitas State Conservatory.

After graduating, Chitchyan became the founding director of the composition department at the Konstantin Sarajev Music School in Yerevan. In 1971 she joined the faculty of the Yerevan Conservatory. In 1982 she was appointed assistant professor, and in 1990 she became a tenured professor.

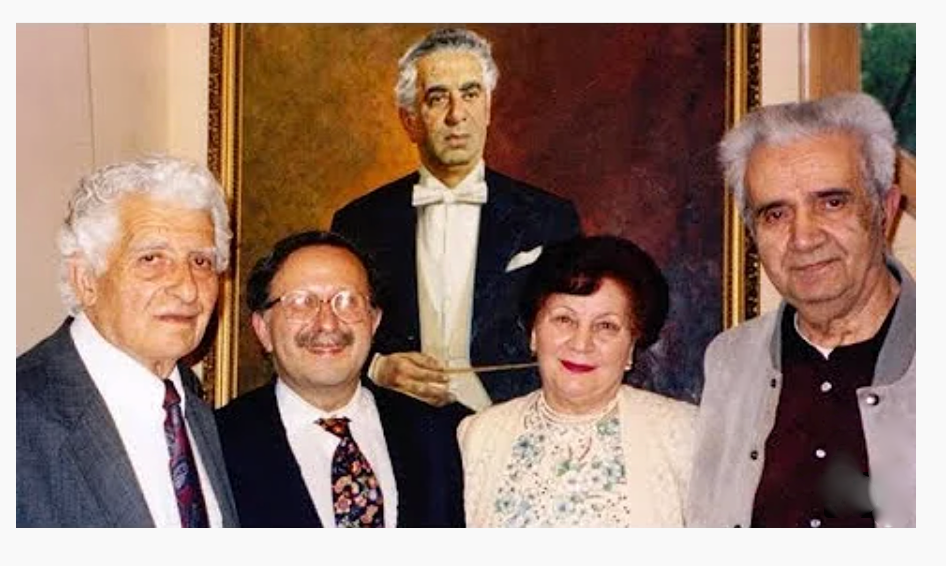
Edvard Mirzoyan, Şahan Arzruni, Geghuni Chitchyan, Alexander Arutiunian in front of Aram Khachaturian's portrait

Chitchyan has been active in various musical and social organizations. She joined the Armenian Composers Union in 1955; was an associate of the Women's Council of Armenia; and a member of the Artistic Forum of State Radio. She is the author of training manuals for music institutes and the co-author of a music textbook for school children.

Chitchyan's compositions have been performed in the United States, Canada, Russia, various Republics of the Soviet Union, England, France, Switzerland, Latvia, Poland, Bulgaria, Lebanon, and Syria. There have been retrospective concerts of her music in Moscow, Yerevan, San Francisco, and Vilnius.

Geghuni Chitchyan is the laureate in more than 30 international and national competitions.

== Compositions ==
Chitchyan's music is characterized by lyricism, immediacy, and vividness. She composes for orchestra, chamber ensembles, various solo instruments, voice, and choral groups, some of which are published by international companies. She has written music for the theatre and children as well.

=== Selected works ===
- «Անդանտե և Ֆուգա» (Andante and Fugue for string quartet), 1949
- «Սոնատ» (Sonata for cello and piano), 1951
- «Հինգ ռոմանսներ» (Five Art Songs, text by Hovhannes Shiraz), 1954
- «Մանկական սյուիտ» (Children’s Suite for orchestra), 1955
- «Բալետային սյուիտ» (Choreographic Suite for orchestra), 1956
- «Հինգ ռոմանսներ» (Five Art Songs, text by Yeghishe Charents, 1957
- «Իմ Հայաստան» (My Armenia, cantata for a cappella chorus, text by Gegham Saryan, Maro Markarian), 1959
- «Սիրո երգեր», ռոմանսների շարք (Songs of Love, vocal cycle for voice and piano, text by Silva Kaputikyan), 1961
- «Կոնցերտ ձայնի և սիմֆոնիկ նվագախմբի համար» (Concerto for voice and orchestra), 1963
- «Յոթ մանկական սիմֆոնիկ պատկերներ» (Seven Symphonic Pictures for Children for orchestra), 1964
- «Հինգ ռոմանսներ» (Five Art Songs, text by Paruyr Sevak), 1964
- «Մանկական էջեր» (Children’s Pieces for piano), 1966
- «Հայրենի քարեր» (Native Stones for a cappella chorus, text by Kankanyan), 1966
- «Բարի լույս», սիմֆոնիկ նախերգանք (Hello Morning! overture for orchestra), 1967
- «Կոնցերտային պիեսներ շեփորի և դաշնամուրի համար» (Concert Pieces for trumpet and piano), 1970
- «Առավոտ», երգերի շարք (A series of 10 songs for voice and piano, various poets), 1972
- «Երեք պիես ջութակահարների անսամպլի համար» (Three pieces for violin ensemble), 1970
- «Հայկական խորաքանդակներ» դաշնամուրի համար (Armenian Bas-Reliefs for piano), 1972
- «Տարվա եղանակներ» (The Seasons, a brief cantata for a cappella women's choir, text by Sargis Kharazyan, Suren Muradyan, and Sarmen), 1972
- «Անհայտ զինվորը» (The Unknown Soldier, poem-requiem for a cappella chorus, text by Suren Muradyan), 1975
- «Էջեր Իսահակյանից» (Pages from Isahakyan, text by Avetik Isahakyan), 1975
- «Ձօն հայրենիքին» (Ode to the Homeland, text by Suren Muradyan), 1976
- «Կոնցերտ ջութակի և նվագախմբի համար» (Concerto for violin and orchestra), 1976
- «Տերևը աշնան» (An Autumn Leaf for a cappella chorus, text by Tsakan Shogents), 1977
- «Երկու կվինտետներ փայտա-փողային գործիքների համար» (Two Woodwind Quintets for Young Players), 1979
- «Սոնատ շեփորի և դաշնամուրի համար» (Sonata for trumpet and piano), 1979
- «Բրելյուտ՝ Նվիրում Սիլվա Կապուտիկյանին» (Prelude in Dedication to Silva Kaputikyan for piano), 1979
- «Երկու շշուկ» (Two Whispers, vocal cycle, text by Vahagn Davtyan), 1979
- «Անսամբլներ դաշնամուրի համար չորս ձեռքով» (Ensemble for piano four hands), 1980
- «Հայոց ծառը», պոեմ (The Tree of Armenia, poem for a cappella choir, text by Suren Muradyan), 1980
- «Սոնատ-մինանվագ թավջութակի համար» (Sonata for solo cello), 1983
- «Երգեր» (A collection of 26 songs for voice and piano, various poets), 1985
- «Սոնատ ալտի և դաշնամուրի համար» (Sonata for viola and piano), 1986
- «Սոնատին» (Sonatina for piano), 1986
- «Կամերային սիմֆոնիա» (Chamber Symphony 'In Memoriam Aram Khachaturian' for string orchestra), 1988
- «Կվինտետ չորս ֆլեյտա և ալտ ֆլեյտաի համար (Quintet for four flutes and alto flute), 1988
- «Թեքվել է սարը» ռոմանսների շարք (The Mountain Bent Down, a cycle of art songs, text by Hamo Sahyan), 1990
- «Մանկական ալբոմ» (Children's Album for piano), 1990
- «Սոնատ ուտի և դաշնամուրի համար» (Sonata for oud and piano), 1990
- «Անձրևը տեղաց» (The Rain Has Poured Down, vocal cycle, text by Samvel Safaryan), 1993
- «Սուրբ հոգի» (The Sacred Soul, text by Abp. Nerses Pozapalian), 1995
- «Երեք աղօթք» (Three Prayers for a cappella chorus, text by Moushegh Ishkhan), 2000
- «Հայկական ուրվանկար» (Armenian Sketch for trumpet and piano), 2001
- «Սոնատ» (Sonata for clarinet and piano), 2006
- «Նովելետ», «Բուրլեսկ» Ֆագոտի և դաշնամուրի համար (Noveletta, Burlesque for bassoon and piano), 2007
- «Ժանեակներ» (Laces for flute and piano), 2008
- «Մթնաձորում», «Ու՞ր ես» (In the Dark Valley, Where Are You?, for a cappella chorus, text by Yeghishe Charents), 2010
- «Էստամպներ» (Estampes for piano, violin and cello), 2012
- «Էպիտաֆիա» դաշնամուրի համար (Epitaph 'In Memory of my brothers' for piano), 2018

== Awards ==
- Merited Art Worker of the Armenian SSR in 1980
- Movses Khorenatsi medal in 2009
- Honored Artist of Armenia in 2011
