= Military University of the Ministry of Defense of the Russian Federation =

Russian military university in Moscow

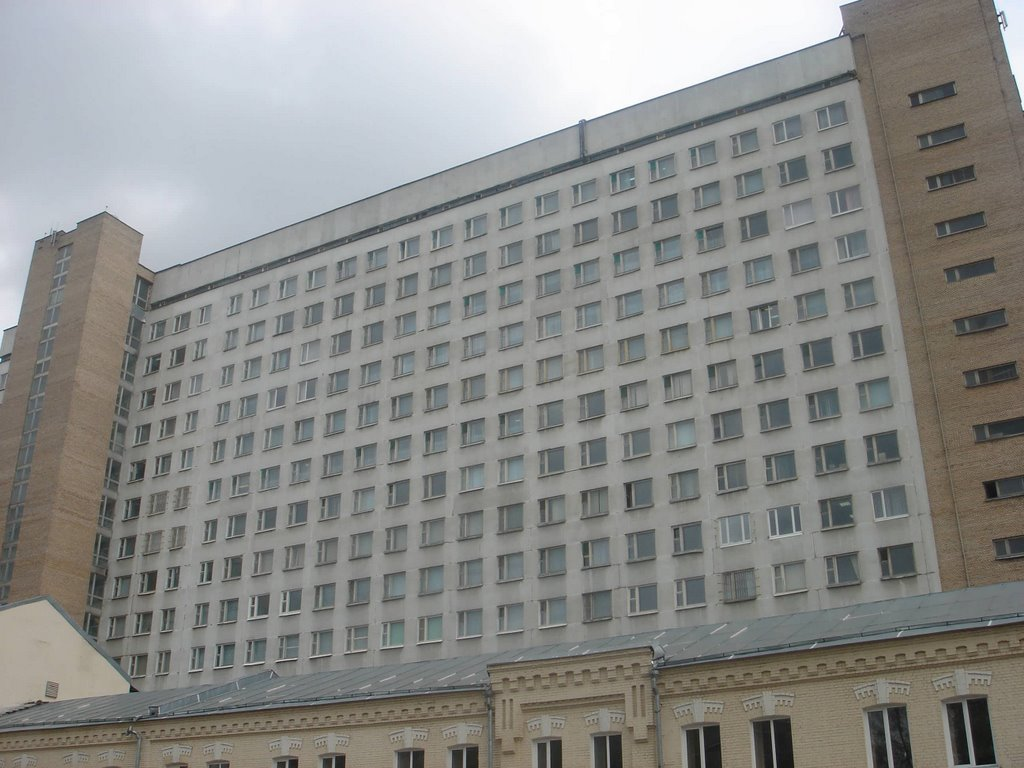
- Type: Federal State Budgetary Military Educational Institution of Higher Professional Education
- Established: 1919
- Rector: Lieutenant General Igor Mishutkin
- Location: 14 Bolshaya Sadovaya Street, Moscow, Moscow Oblast, Russia
- Honorary Title: "Prince Alexander Nevsky"
- Website: vumo.mil.ru
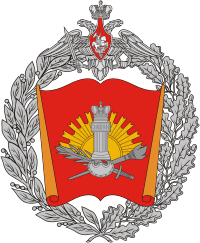

The Military University of the Ministry of Defense of the Russian Federation named after Prince Alexander Nevsky (Russian: Военный университет Министерства обороны Российской Федерации, romanized: Voyennyy universitet Ministerstva oborony Rossiyskoy Federatsii) is a Russian military university operated by the Ministry of Defense of Russia (MOD). It is located on 14 Bol'shaya Sadovaya Street in Moscow. Since October 2017, the Commandant of the university has been Lieutenant General Igor Mishutkin.

== History ==
=== 1919—1974 ===
The Military University started as the Teaching Institute of the Red Army which opened on November 5, 1919, by the order of N.G. Tolmachev of the Petrograd Military District. The first Commandant of the school was Mikhail Apletin.

In 1940, the Council of People's Commissars of the USSR adopted a resolution to organize the Military Faculty of Foreign Languages at the 2nd Moscow State Pedagogical Institute for Foreign Languages (2nd MGPIFL) as a higher military educational institution. Its main task was to train military instructors in English, German, and French languages for schools and academies of the Red Army.

At the beginning of 1941, the faculty received a new official name: the Military Faculty of Western Languages at the 1st and 2nd MGPIFL. On April 12, 1942, by the order of the People's Commissar of Defense of the USSR, the Military Faculty of Western Languages at the 2nd MGPIFL was transformed into the Military Institute of Foreign Languages of the Red Army (VIIAKA). According to the same order, the institute included the Military Faculty of Eastern Languages at the Moscow Institute of Oriental Studies and the military courses of foreign languages from the city of Orsk. The first head of the Military Institute of Foreign Languages of the Red Army was Russian-Italian Major General Nikolai Biasi, and his deputy in the political department was Political Commissar Petr Babkin.

=== 1974—1994 ===
On August 1, 1974, the Military Institute of the Ministry of Defense (Soviet Union) was formed as an affiliated school of the Vladimir Lenin Military-Political Academy.

=== 1994—present ===
The modern university was established on July 20, 1994, on the basis of the unification of the Military-Political Academy and Military Institute. For the first time in one school, the economic, humanitarian, legal and philological areas of officer training were taught at the university level.

In 2003, for the first time in the history of military universities, an off-budget faculty was formed at the university, where civilians can also study on a paid basis. Every year it enjoys more and more popularity among civilian youth. In 2008, the number of faculty is 1035 people.

After the creation of the Main Military-Political Directorate in 2018, it was decided that from 2019 the university will become the main university for training specialists in military-political work.

On November 5, 2019, the Minister of Defense of Russia, General Sergei Shoigu, presented the Order of Zhukov to the Military University of the Ministry of Defense of the Russian Federation.

By order of the Government of the Russian Federation on September 24, 2021, the honorary title “named after Prince Alexander Nevsky” was conferred upon it.

== Lineage ==
- Vladimir Lenin Military-Political Academy
- Military Institute of Foreign Languages
- Military Law Academy
- Military Financial Academy
- Lviv Higher Military-Political School
- Moscow Military Conservatory

== Leadership ==
=== Current leadership structure ===
- Rector/Commandant – Igor Mishutkin
- Deputy Commandant – Vladimir Lugovoy
- Deputy Commandant of the Military University – Vladimir Meadov
- Deputy Commandant of the Military University for Academic and Scientific Work – Mikhail Smyslov
- Deputy Commandant of the Military University – Valery Shevtsov
- Deputy Commandant of the Military University – Larisa Krasnoperova
- Deputy Commandant of the Military University for Military Political Work – Sergey Basov
- Chief Researcher and Academic Supervisor – Valery Marchenkov

=== Departments ===
- Academic Council
- Educational and Methodical Department
- Department of Organizing Scientific Work and Training of Scientific and Pedagogical Personnel
- Human Resources Department
- Drill Department
- Financial and Economic Service
- Mobilization Department
- State Secrets Protection Service
- Clinic (Branch of the Burdenko Main Clinical Hospital of the General Staff of the Armed Forces)
- Libraries
- Base for Educational Process Support
- Military Band

== List of Rectors ==
Colonel General Valery Marchenkov hands an award to a United States Army private for his participation in the 2010 Moscow Victory Day Parade.

- 1974-1978 - Colonel General Ivan Katyshkin
- 1978-1988 - Colonel General Magomed Tankaev
- 1988-1992 - Lieutenant-General Alexey Tyurin
- 1992-1993 - Lieutenant-General Yu. V. Mishin
- 1994-1999 - Colonel General Nikolai Zvinchukov
- 1999-2001 - Colonel General Ivan Efremov
- 2001-2017 - Colonel General Valery Marchenkov
- 2017-Present - Lieutenant General Igor Mishutkin

== Offerings ==
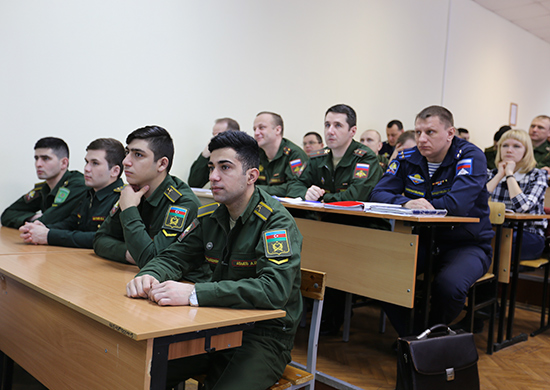
Cadets from Azerbaijan and Turkmenistan in the university.

The university focuses on the five areas of military-humanitarian, military-legal, military-philological, military-conductor and military-financial. It has undergraduate, post graduate and professional continuing education. There are 53 departments across 10 faculties. It teaches 22 foreign languages. There are 11 dissertation councils. In addition to training active duty military, the school offers 15 civilian specialties for recently discharged military members seeking retraining.

The university is organized into the following sections:

- College of Military Music and Institute of Military Band Conductors
- National Guard College of the Military University
- Military Political Affairs College
- College of Military Finance
- College of Military Justice
- College of Military Humanities
- College of Foreign Languages
- Special Faculties Course
- Faculty of Foreign Budgets and Finances
- Advanced Training and Continuing Education College
- Military Prosecution Institute

=== Institute of Military Band Conductors ===
The Institute of Military Band Conductors (Russian: Военного Института (Военных Дирижёров)), which falls as part of the College of Military Music, is a sub-branch of the Military University of the Ministry of Defense.

The history of the institution dates back to 1935, when a military department was created on the basis of the department of the orchestra faculty of the Moscow State Conservatory. In 1938, the faculty was expanded, organizing full-time post-graduate studies in the specialties of conducting and instrumentation. In 1944, the military department became a separate military musical university and in August 1945, the university was presented its Colour. In November 1946, the university was renamed to the Higher School of Military Conductors of the Soviet Army. In 1960, during a campaign to reduce the size of the Soviet Armed Forces, the Institute of Military Conductors was reorganized into the Military Bands Directorial Department at the Tchaikovsky Conservatory.

On 4 April 2001, the Government of Russia renamed the department as the Moscow Military Conservatory. On 10 April 2006, it was transferred to the Military University, becoming today the Institute of Military Band Conductors.

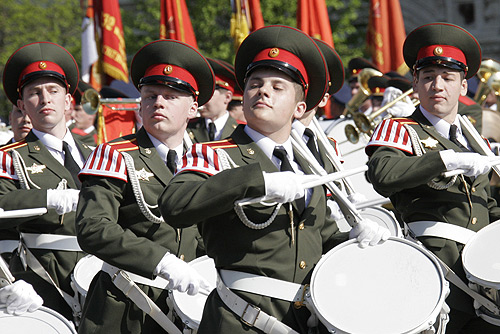
Members of the institute during the 2009 Moscow Victory Day Parade.

It often holds inter-university practical conferences on musical training methods.I

==== Bands ====
The Cadet Band of the Institute of Military Band Conductors (Russian: Оркестр Курсантов Военного Института) is a military marching band and instrumental ensemble in the Ministry of Defense of Russia (MOD) and the larger Russian Armed Forces. The band has repeatedly performed at international competitions and festivals, in various television and radio broadcasts. The university band team is the affiliated marching band of the university, being the equivalent of the Band of the Royal Military College of Canada. It is a diploma winner of the review competition of the regular military bands of Moscow Military District. It plays an important role in the educational activities of the university. It annually participates in the Moscow Victory Day Parade and the parade dedicated to 1941 October Revolution Parade. It often performs at central venues in Moscow, such as the Great Hall of the Moscow Conservatory, the Central Academic Theater of the Russian Army, and the Central House of Officers of the Russian Army.

== Foreign students ==
Most nations in the Commonwealth of Independent States have an agreement with the university that calls for the intake of their military personnel into the university. A number of individual Arab countries (Libya, Yemen, Egypt etc.) are being trained at graduate courses of the special faculty of the Military University. In January 2020, the Council of Ministers of Thailand approved a draft agreement on sending cadets of the Royal Thai Armed Forces cadets to courses at the university.

== Gallery ==
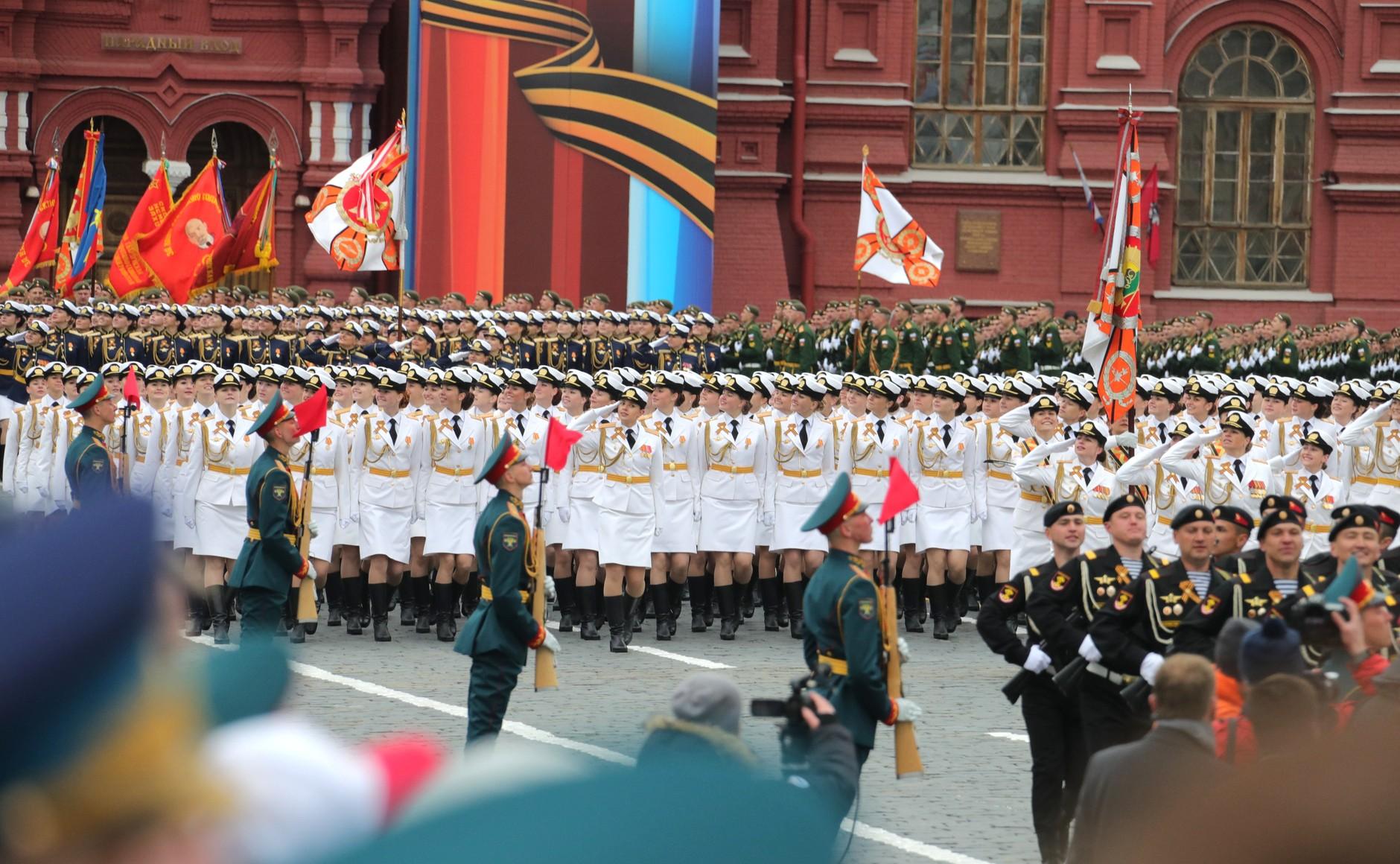
Female officers of the university.

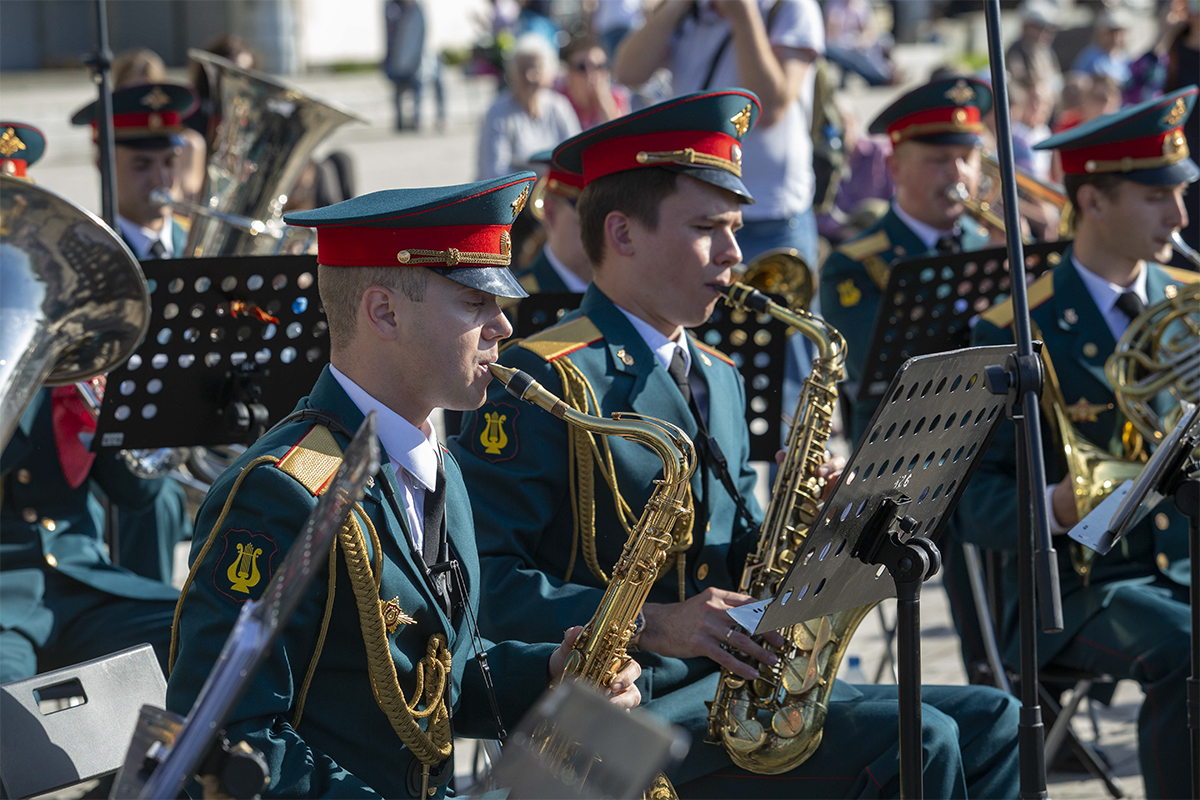
The university band.

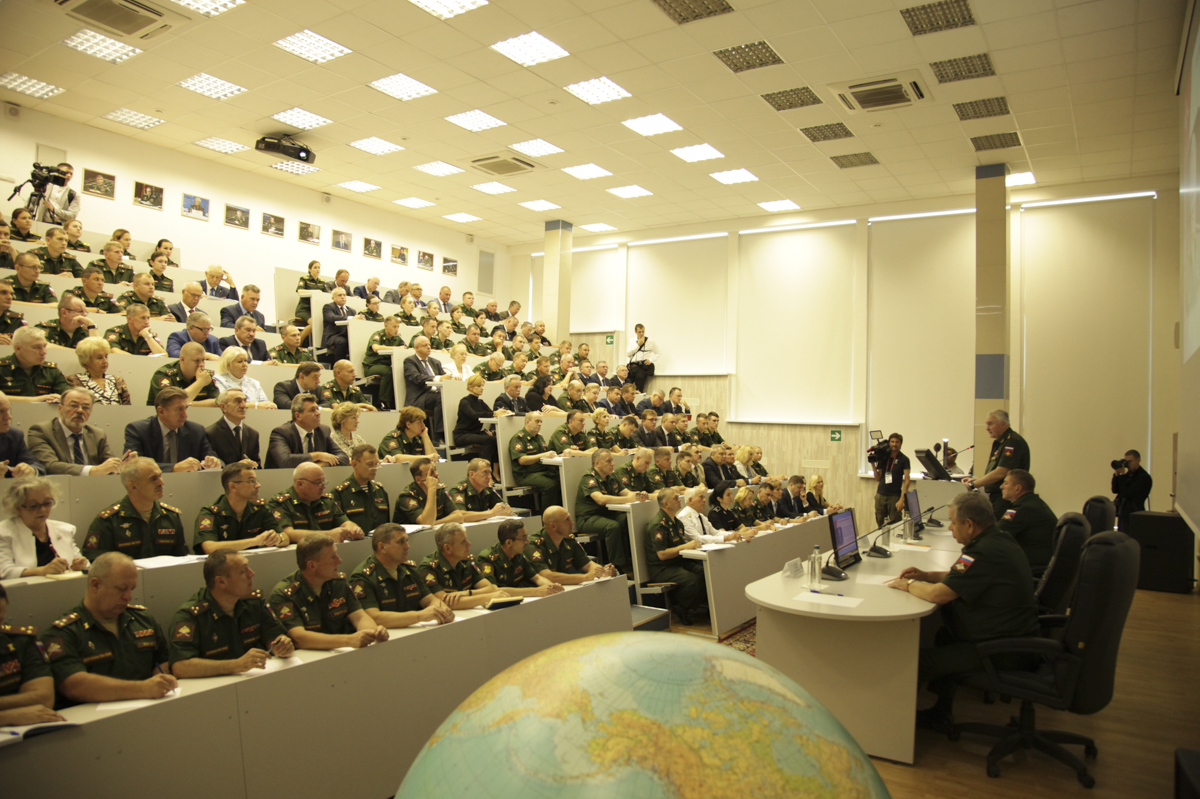

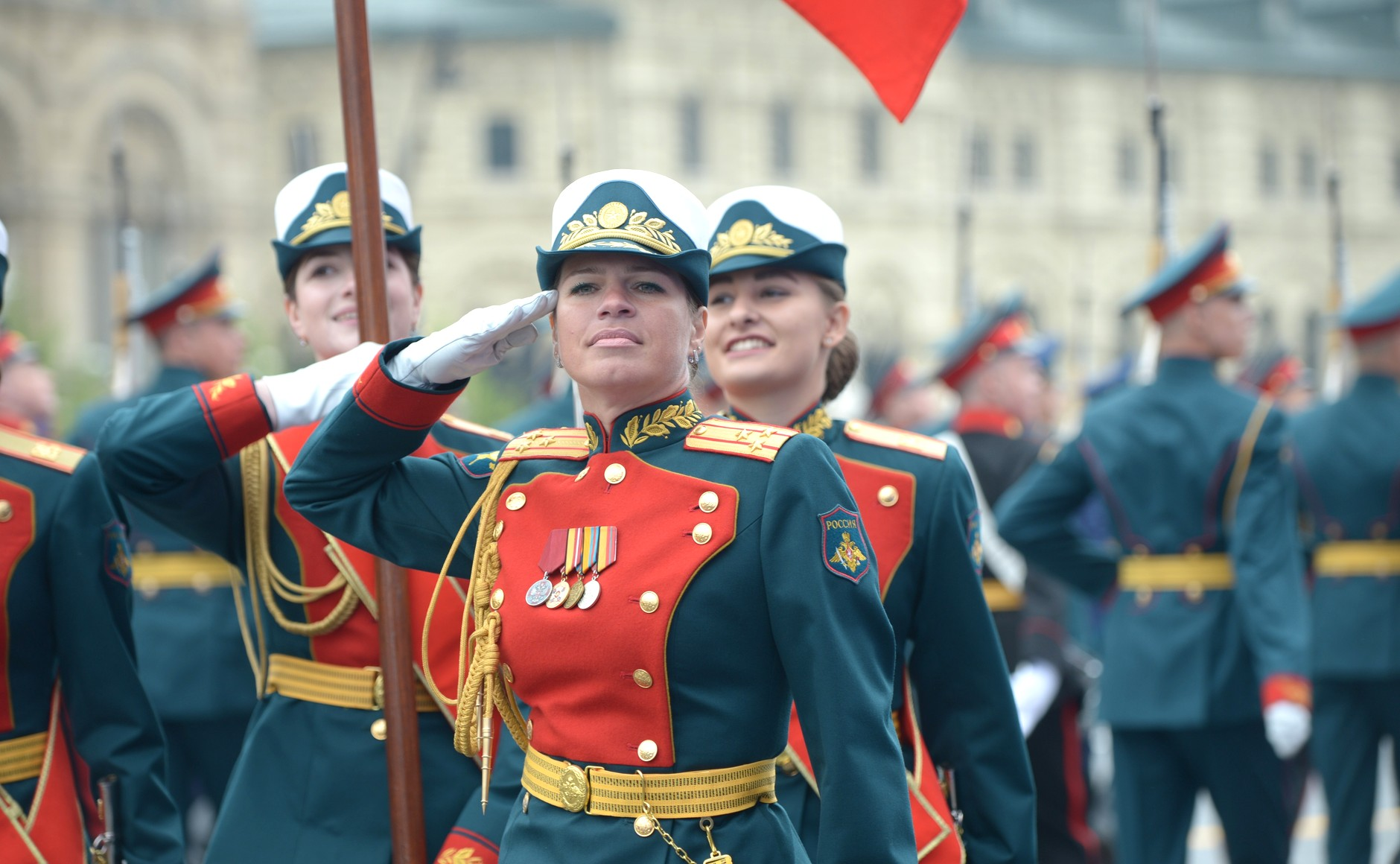
The female honour guard

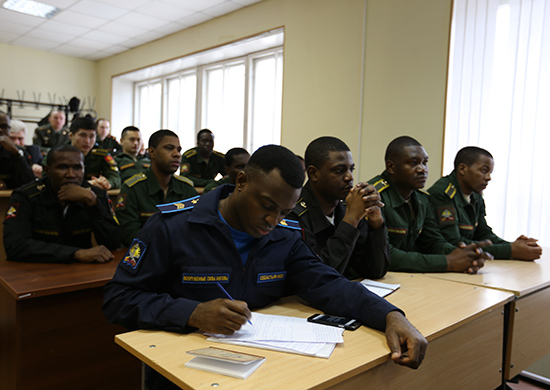

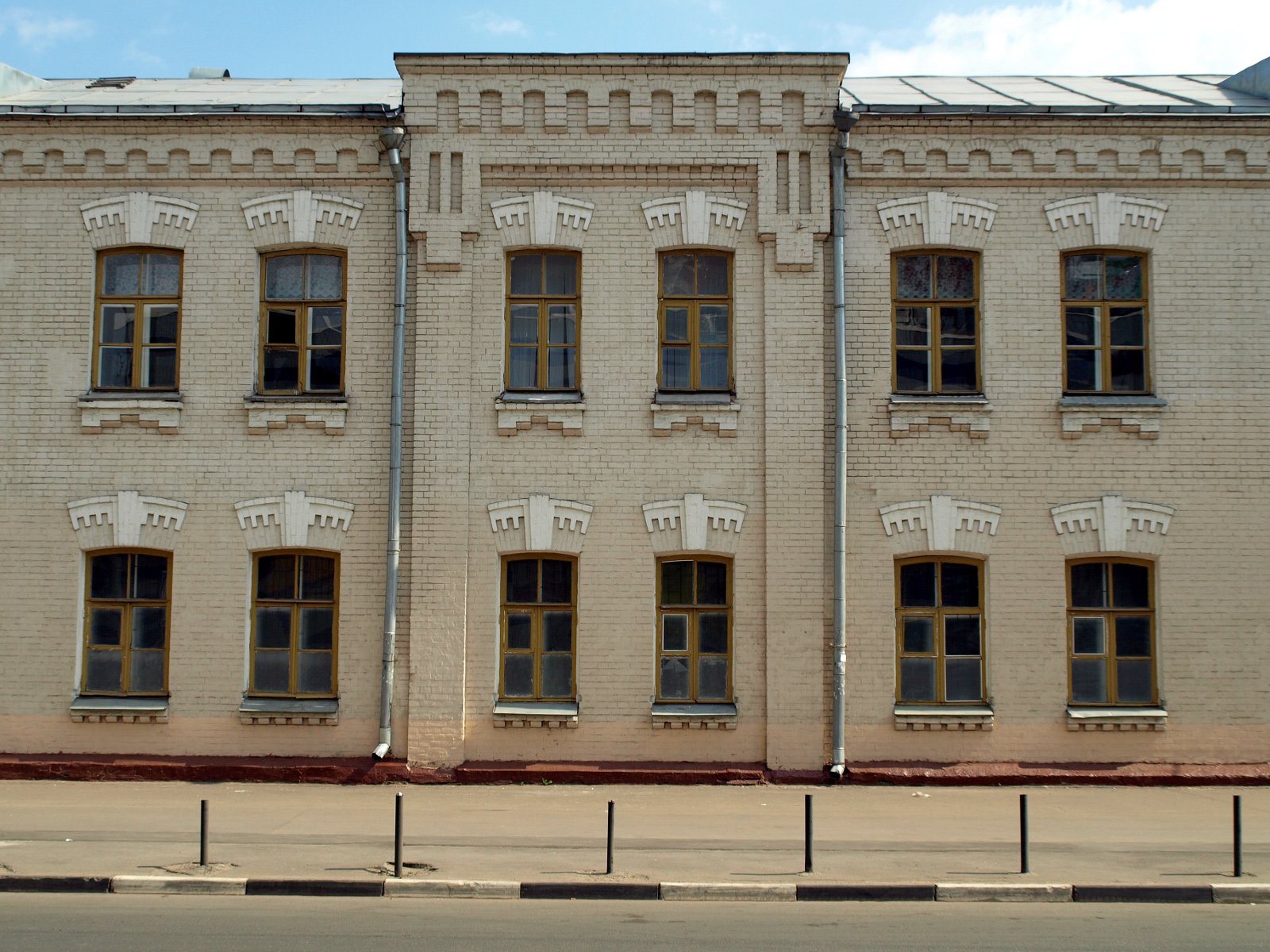
