= 2004 world oil market chronology =

- January 18: Saudi Aramco formally inaugurates its new Haradh oil and natural gas facility. The Haradh plant is expected to boost Saudi natural gas production capacity by roughly 25%, most of which is slated for the domestic market. The Haradh facility also includes a gas-oil separation plant capable of processing 300,000 bbl/d (48,000 m^{3}/d), as well as infrastructure for delivering up to 170,000 bbl/d (27,000 m^{3}/d) of condensates to the Kingdom's Abqaiq processing facility. Developing the country's relatively untapped natural gas potential could allow more oil to be allocated for export in the future. (Reuters, LAT, Platts)
- January 22: U.S. Secretary of the Interior Gale Norton approves a plan to open parts of Alaska’s North Slope to oil exploration and drilling. Nine million acres (36,000 km^{2}) of Alaska's National Petroleum Reserve will be opened to long-term production. The site lies adjacent to the Arctic National Wildlife Refuge, which remains closed to oil and gas drilling. (WP)
- February 11: OPEC delegates meeting in Algiers agree to lower the cartel's output ceiling by 1 million barrels (160,000 m^{3}) per day, to 23.5 million barrels per day (3,740,000 m^{3}/d), effective April 1. OPEC members also urge immediate compliance with the existing OPEC ceiling, as overproduction has been estimated at 1.5 million barrels per day (240,000 m^{3}/d). Assuming full quota compliance, the decision could remove a total of 2.5 million barrels per day (400,000 m^{3}/d) from the world market in April. (NYT, WSJ)
- February 19: The Royal Dutch Shell group announces that the Securities and Exchange Commission (SEC) has begun a formal investigation into the company's restatement of its oil and gas reserves. On January 9, 2004, Royal Dutch/Shell announced that it had overstated its proven oil and gas reserves by 3.9 billion barrels (620,000,000 m^{3}), or 20% due to overly optimistic assumptions about plans for developing its fields around the world. (NYT)
- February 25: Total (France) and Petronas (Malaysia) sign an estimated $2 billion agreement with the National Iranian Oil Company to build Iran's first liquefied natural gas (LNG) export facility. The two-train facility will have a capacity of 390 billion cubic feet (1.1×10^{10} m^{3}) per year, with natural gas to come from Iran’s South Pars field. Production of LNG is expected to begin in 2009. Iran holds the world’s second largest natural gas reserves—after Russia—and development of LNG facilities would allow the country to export gas around the world. (WMRC)
- February 26: The United States rescinds a ban on travel to Libya and authorizes U.S. oil companies with pre-sanctions holdings in Libya to negotiate on their return to the country if and when the United States lifts economic sanctions. The United States first imposed sanctions on Libya in 1986 following terrorist attacks in Rome and Vienna. Several U.S. oil companies were forced to abandon their assets in Libya when sanctions were imposed in 1986, including the “Oasis Group” (Marathon Oil, ConocoPhillips, Amerada Hess) and Occidental Petroleum. (WSJ)
- March 31: OPEC members unanimously agree to implement the cartel’s oil production cuts effective April 1, as agreed to in February. Relatively high prices for oil and petroleum products had prompted several consuming countries, including the United States, to suggest that OPEC members vote to postpone the cuts and put downward pressure on oil prices. According to the cartel’s official communiqué following the meeting, “Notwithstanding prevailing high prices, the Conference observed that the crude oil market remains more than well supplied as the world moves into the traditionally lower seasonal demand period.” (Reuters)
- April 21: A car bomb explodes outside a police building in Riyadh, Saudi Arabia, marking the first major attack by militants on governmental targets in the Kingdom. Four people are killed and 148 are wounded. The country's major export facilities are not harmed, but port authorities maintain a “heightened sense of security.” Saudi Arabia is the world's largest oil producer and America's second largest foreign supplier of crude oil and petroleum products after Canada. (Reuters, Platts, EIA)
- May 22: OPEC oil ministers meet in Amsterdam at a forum of energy producing and consuming nations to discuss a response to high oil prices (near-month West Texas Intermediate was above $40 per barrel the previous week). Saudi Arabia calls on OPEC to raise production quotas by as much as 11%, but the ministers do not come to an agreement other than to meet again in Beirut on June 3. Saudi Arabia decides to unilaterally increase its crude oil production beyond its quota to 9.1 million barrels per day (1,450,000 m^{3}/d) in June. (Reuters)
- May 30: Saudi militants attack a complex in Khobar, Saudi Arabia, housing foreign workers. After killing various Saudis and foreigners upon entering the compound on May 29, the militants take hostages, and later kill nine of them. Three of the militants are able to escape despite the efforts of the Saudi security forces. This attack, as well as earlier ones in the kingdom, has foreigners and foreign firms reconsidering their presence in Saudi Arabia. (Reuters)
- June 1: Near-month crude oil futures on the NYMEX reach a record nominal settlement high of $42.33 per barrel, with traders thought to be reacting to the weekend terrorist attacks in Saudi Arabia on top of an already tight market. This is the highest nominal settlement price since the founding of the NYMEX crude oil futures market in 1983. (WSJ)
- June 3: OPEC Ministers meeting in Beirut agree to raise OPEC production quotas by a combined 2 million barrels per day (320,000 m^{3}/d) effective July 1 and a further 500 million barrels per day (79,000,000 m^{3}/d) effective August 1. This will bring the combined quota in August for the 10 OPEC countries participating in the quota system (Iraq does not participate) to 26 million barrels per day (4,100,000 m^{3}/d). Crude oil prices fall somewhat in response to this news. OPEC is scheduled to meet again on July 21 to review this decision. (AP)
- June 4: U.S. Assistant Secretary of Commerce William H. Lash announces that Libya has sent its first shipment of crude oil to the United States since the resumption of ties between the two countries in recent months. (AP)
- June 15: Workers at French state energy companies Electricité de France and Gaz de France go on strike in protest over plans to privatize the two companies. Workers reduce electricity output by about 15% on June 15 and by 10% on June 16. A 225-kilovolt line between France and Spain is also cut, and reductions are targeted at areas where prominent politicians live and at national landmarks as the strike continues throughout the month. The striking workers also cause delivery reductions at two LNG terminals. (Reuters)
- July 15: OPEC agrees to raise its crude oil production target by 500,000 barrels (79,000 m^{3}) (2% of current OPEC production) by August 1—in an effort to moderate high crude oil prices. (WSJ)
- July 22: Yukos, one of Russia’s largest crude oil producers, warns that it could go bankrupt within three weeks because of the government's decision to freeze its assets and bank accounts, jeopardizing the operations of Russia's largest oil producer and potentially disrupting the company's exports to world markets. (WP)
- August 9: The Russian government disregards the August 6 ruling of a Moscow court and seizes the main production unit of Yukos, Yuganskneftegaz. On August 6, the court had declared that the Russian government's seizure of Yuganskneftegaz was illegal, a decision which had marked the first major court victory for Yukos since Russian authorities began proceedings against the company more than a year ago. Furthermore, on August 5, the government had unexpectedly withdrawn permission for Yukos to use its financial assets to continue operations, reversing a decision made 24 hours earlier. (WP, WSJ)
- September 14: In the biggest disruption of the region's output in at least two years, Hurricane Ivan forces Royal Dutch Shell, ChevronTexaco, ExxonMobil, and Total to shut some hundreds of thousands of barrels per day of Gulf of Mexico oil production as the companies evacuate more than 3,000 workers from the offshore oil platforms. Oil tankers from Venezuela also face a three-day delay on deliveries to the United States because of the hurricane. The U.S. Minerals Management Service reports that Ivan has reduced Gulf Coast oil production by 61%. (Bloomberg, DJ, Reuters)
- September 20: President Bush lifts a variety of U.S. sanctions on Libya, paving the way for American oil companies to try to secure contracts or revive previous contracts for tapping Libya's oil reserves, estimated at 36 billion barrels (5.7×10^{9} m^{3}). (NYT)
- September 24: In the aftermath of Hurricane Ivan, U.S. Secretary of Energy Spencer Abraham agrees to release 1.7 million barrels (270,000 m^{3}) of oil in the form of a loan from the Strategic Petroleum Reserve. Refineries are reporting supply shortages due to cuts in production and delayed imports. Prices of NYMEX WTI prompt month crude oil rise $0.42 to $48.88 per barrel despite the release. A bout 472,000 bbl/d (75,000 m^{3}/d) of crude oil production is shut-in, along with 2.3 billion cubic feet (65,000,000 m^{3}) per day of natural gas production. By February 2005, lasting damage from the Hurricane continues to cause shut-ins of over 43 million barrels (6,800,000 m^{3}) of crude oil production (over 7% of the yearly production in the Gulf of Mexico) and over 172×10^{9} cu ft (4.9×10^{9} m^{3}) of natural gas (almost 4% of the Gulf's yearly production). (NYT, MMS)
- October 22: The NYMEX WTI prompt month crude oil contract price closes at an all-time high of $55.17 per barrel after the Energy Information Administration reports a fifth straight weekly decrease in U.S. heating oil stocks. Lasting effects from Hurricane Ivan have also forced the shut-in of natural gas and crude oil production from the Gulf Coast. (NYT, CNN)
- October 28: After its approval by the Russian cabinet and the lower half of the Russian legislature earlier in October, the upper house of the legislature ratifies the Kyoto Protocol global climate treaty and returns it to the executive branch for its approval. Russian ratification is necessary for the Protocol to take effect because participating countries must have been responsible for 55% of global emission in 1990, and Russia is the only remaining country that can trigger the 55% threshold. One of the Protocol's main tasks is to implement a reduction in emissions of the six greenhouse gases to 1990 levels by 2012. The Bush administration announced three years ago that it would not join the accord. (WP, USA Today)
- November 2: Saboteurs mount a large attack on Iraq’s oil infrastructure by blowing up three pipelines in the north, thereby cutting exports at the Turkish port of Ceyhan. The first pipeline attack destroys a portion of the export route to Turkey, and other explosions occur in an area about 40 miles (64 km) southwest of the oil producing center of Kirkuk. The explosions affect oil supplies to Iraq’s biggest refinery at Baiji and imports of refined products. Crude oil exports resumed three days later. (Reuters)
- November 16: A U.S. Senate probe finds that Iraq illegally earned approximately $21.3 billion by circumventing UN sanctions between 1991 and 2003. The figure is double the amount reported by the Duelfer Report that was released in October 2004. The Senate’s Permanent Subcommittee on Investigations also releases details on the way in which Saddam Hussein manipulated the UN’s Oil for Food Program. (WP)
- November 22: Ukraine holds a run-off presidential election between Prime Minister Viktor Yanukovych and opposition leader Viktor Yushchenko. Although exit polls show large-scale support for Yushchenko, initial official results show Yanukovych with a 2% lead. Massive opposition-led protests ensue in Kyiv in what is commonly referred to as the “Orange Revolution”. Ukraine is a pivotal transit state for Russian oil and natural gas exports to continental Europe, as well as a major regional producer of coal. Yushschenko later wins a third runoff election at the end of December 2004. (NYT, AP)
- December 5: Around 300 unarmed Nigerian villagers - including women and children - from the Kula community in Rivers State in the southern Niger Delta, seize three oil flow stations operated by multinational oil companies Shell and ChevronTexaco, shutting in 100 million barrels per day (16,000,000 m^{3}/d) (bbl/d) of production for one week. A community spokesman claims that his people are protesting because they feel they have been overlooked for jobs. The incident is the second attack on oil flow stations in the Niger Delta in two weeks. (WMRC)
- December 10: In its quarterly meeting, OPEC agrees to cut production of crude oil to official quota levels. The OPEC Ministers say the cartel will lower crude oil production by 1 Mbbl/d (160,000 m^{3}/d) effective January 1. Currently, ten of OPEC's members are exceeding their 27 Mbbl/d (4,300,000 m^{3}/d) official quota by 1,000,000 bbl/d (160,000 m^{3}/d) (Iraq does not have a quota). OPEC members pledge to meet again on January 30 to discuss whether further cuts are necessary. Saudi Arabia plans to decrease crude oil output by 500,000 bbl/d (79,000 m^{3}/d) starting on January 1, 2005. (NYT, AP, WP)
- December 18: Yuganskneftegaz, the largest subsidiary of Yukos, is auctioned off to a previously unknown company called Baikal Finans Group (BFG) for a well-below-market value of $9.4 billion. The unit is being sold to help cover more than $27 billion in tax claims the Russian government says it is owed by Yukos over the last year—part of a broader campaign against the company and its founder, Mikhail B. Khodorkovsky. Under threat of having the government auction its largest oil asset, Yukos filed for bankruptcy in a U.S. court in Houston, Texas, earlier in the week. In response, many banks that were preparing to back Gazprom in its bid for the oil unit dropped their support. Russian state-owned oil company Rosneft buys all of BFG five days later. (WSJ, NYT)
- December 20: Exelon, the United States’ largest nuclear power producer agrees to buy New Jersey–based Public Service Enterprise Group (PSEG) for a reported $13.2 billion in stock, thus creating the largest utility in the United States. Pending some anticipated regulatory hurdles, the combined company will increase Exelon's generating capacity about 50% to around 52,000 megawatts (MW). (Reuters)
- December 26: The world's largest earthquake in 40 years triggers a devastating tsunami centered in the Indian Ocean affecting largely populated coastal areas of India, Sri Lanka, Malaysia, Indonesia, and Thailand. Almost 300,000 local residents and tourists are killed in the tsunami waves, yet damage to energy infrastructure is limited. Relief aid flows into the area from all over the world, increasing the value of local currencies. (NYT, WP, AP, Reuters)
- December 31: The Russian government gives its long-awaited final approval for the Eastern Siberia – Pacific Ocean oil pipeline to the Pacific port of Nakhodka that would allow for exports to Japan and the western United States. The decision to move ahead with the Nakhodka pipeline rules out a proposed line to Daqing, China; however some concessions to China are expected. State oil pipeline monopoly Transneft will build a 1.6 Mbbl/d (250,000 m^{3}/d) capacity pipeline from Taishet in East Siberia to the Perevoznaya Bay in the Pacific Primorsk region. The government gives no firm timeframe for the project, but says final proposals should be made before May 2005. (Reuters)

== Sources ==
- Energy Information Administration: Chronology of World Oil Market Events
- Commodity Research Bureau. The CRB Commodity Yearbook 2004, 2004.
- Other sources include: Associated Press (AP), Dow Jones (DJ), Los Angeles Times (LAT), The New York Times (NYT), Oil Daily (OD), USA Today (USAT), The Wall Street Journal (WSJ), The Washington Post (WP), World Markets Research Center (WMRC).

previous year: 2003 world oil market chronology	This article is part of the Chronology of world oil market events (1970-2005)	following year: 2005 world oil market chronology
