= 2003 world oil market chronology =

- January 6: Venezuelan Minister of Energy and Mines Rafael Ramírez announces that the Government of Venezuela plans to split state oil company PDVSA into two separate entities as part of a large-scale restructuring of the company, most of whose 40,000 workers are currently on strike. Such a decentralization could limit the power of Caracas-based executives who have joined in the strike, which began on December 2, 2002. (NYT)
- January 12: The Organization of Petroleum Exporting Countries (OPEC), meeting in Vienna, agrees to raise the aggregate production quota of its members (excluding Iraq) to 24.5 million barrels per day (3,900,000 m^{3}/d), up from the current 23 million barrels per day (3,700,000 m^{3}/d), effective February 1. Each member will receive a proportionately higher share of the quota, about a 6.5% increase. (NYT)
- January 16: Fourteen U.S. corporations or subsidiaries launch the Chicago Climate Exchange, a trading program wherein companies would be able to earn redeemable credits for exceeding emissions reductions goals of 4% of 1998-2001 average emissions over the next four years. Companies unable to meet the goals would buy the credits. The Exchange intends to create means to verify that actual reductions in emissions have taken place. (WP)
- January 21: The near-month crude oil futures price on the New York Mercantile Exchange settles at $34.61 per barrel, the highest price since November 29, 2000. The market is experiencing a variety of higher price pressures, including the strike in Venezuela, fears of a conflict in Iraq, a cold winter in the United States, and low commercial oil stock levels in the United States. (USAT)
- January 28: The United States Department of Energy approves oil company requests to delay delivery of March shipments to the Strategic Petroleum Reserve (SPR). The announcement will allow 4.4 million barrels (700,000 m^{3}) of crude oil designated for storage in the SPR, to be marketed to domestic refineries instead. (Reuters)
- January 29: Striking managers at Venezuelan state oil company PdVSA confirm that oil production has surpassed 1 million barrels per day (160,000 m^{3}/d) once again, after falling to as low as 200 million barrels per day (32,000,000 m^{3}/d) during the strike that began on December 2. On January 31, PdVSA President Ali Rodriguez announces that production is at 1.5 million barrels per day (240,000 m^{3}/d) and that 5,300 striking workers have been fired. Opposition estimates of production are much lower at around 1.05 million barrels per day (167,000 m^{3}/d). (NYT, Reuters)
- January 29: During his State of the Union Address, President George W Bush proposes $1.2 billion in funding to support the research and development of hydrogen-powered vehicles. (Reuters)
- February 3: Indian Petroleum Minister Ram Naik announces that the government of India plans to boost the country's strategic crude oil reserves to 45 days from 15 days at an estimated cost of 43.50 billion rupees ($910 million). (Reuters)
- February 6: Iranian Oil Minister Bijan Zanganeh announces that phases two and three of the South Pars natural gas field are now on-line. These phases represent additional production of about 55 million cubic meters (1.9 trillion cubic feet) of natural gas per year, 85 million barrels per day (13,500,000 m^{3}/d) of condensate, and 1 million metric tons (11.6 million barrels) of liquefied petroleum gas per year. The two phases are officially inaugurated on February 15. (DJ)
- February 11: BP invests $6.75 billion in Russia by creating a new joint venture company with TNK-BP (Russia's fourth largest oil company) and Sidanco, of which BP already held a 25% stake. BP will have a 50% stake in the new company. TNK's shareholders, investment groups Alfa Group and Access-Renova, will hold the other 50% stake of the new firm, and board control will be balanced equally. The investment by BP is equivalent to almost 10% of Russian foreign exchange reserves and around 1.5% of Russian gross domestic product (GDP). (Reuters)
- February 12: Data from the United States Energy Information Administration (EIA) show that U.S. commercial crude oil stocks have fallen to 269.8 million barrels (42,890,000 m^{3}) for the week ending February 7, 2003. This is the lowest commercial crude oil stock level since 1975, and just slightly below the lower operational inventory level of 270 million barrels (43,000,000 m^{3}). The lower operational inventory level, while not implying shortages, operational problems, or price increases, is indicative of a situation where inventory-related supply flexibility could be constrained or nonexistent. (Reuters)
- February 18: ExxonMobil begins construction of the $3 billion Kizomba B offshore development project in Angolan waters. The project, when completed, is expected to produce 250 million barrels (40,000,000 m^{3}) of crude oil per day, beginning in 2006, with total production over the life of the field estimated to be about 1 billion barrels (160,000,000 m^{3}). Besides ExxonMobil, which has a 40% stake, the other stakeholders are BP (27%), Eni (20%) and Statoil (13%). The concessionaire is Angolan state oil company Sonangol. (Reuters)
- February 28: The NYMEX near-month heating oil futures price settles at an all-time high of 125.59 cents per gallon, as many of the same market forces affecting the crude oil market also have driven up the price of heating oil, especially increased demand from the cold winter. High sulfur distillate fuel inventories (also referred to as heating oil) plunged more than 15% over the most recent four-week period to end the week of February 28, at 35.6 million barrels (5,660,000 m^{3}), 32% below the level for the same period last year. (Reuters)
- March 5: Some 500,000 bbl/d (79,000 m^{3}/d) of Venezuelan production in the eastern region begins to come back on-line. It was shut off at the wellhead for a week because of bottlenecks at export terminals as Venezuelan state oil company PdVSA encountered problems in returning loading at terminals to pre-strike levels. The Venezuelan government claims that oil production is over 2 million barrels per day (320,000 m^{3}/d), while fired PdVSA workers claim production is at 1.1 million barrels per day (170,000 m^{3}/d). (Reuters)
- March 6: Venezuelan President Hugo Chávez announces that force majeure is henceforth lifted on Venezuelan oil exports. Venezuela had declared force majeure on its oil exports shortly after the national strike began on December 2, 2002. It is later revealed that this lifting does not apply to certain petroleum products. President Chavez also refuses to consider rehiring any of the over 15,000 fired PdVSA workers. (Reuters)
- March 7: The New York Mercantile Exchange (NYMEX) puts into effect expanded price limits on its energy contracts and reduces to five minutes the time trading is halted when those limits are reached. Under the revised rules, the initial price limits for light, sweet crude oil futures will be expanded to $10 per barrel in all months from the current $7.50 in the first two months and $3.00 in all other months. The initial Henry Hub natural gas futures limits will expand to $3.00 per million British thermal units in all months from $1 in all months. The initial limits on heating oil, gasoline and propane futures will increase to 25 cents per gallon in all months from 20 cents in the first two months and 6 cents in all other months. (Reuters)
- March 7: Officials in the United States Environmental Protection Agency (EPA) announce that new clean water regulations for smaller sites, to take effect March 10, will not apply to the petroleum and natural gas industries. Rather, these two industries will have a two-year exemption, because, according to the EPA, further study of the effects of these regulations upon these two industries is needed. (NYT)
- March 11: The Organization of Petroleum Exporting Countries (OPEC) meets in Vienna and decides to maintain crude oil production quotas for its member countries (excluding Iraq) at 24.5 million barrels per day (3,900,000 m^{3}/d). Saudi Arabia's Oil Minister, Ali al-Naimi says, "There will be no shortage of oil. The test is, when the need is there, whether we will use the capacity or not and I can assure you we will. Most analysts, including EIA, believe that OPEC-10's (excluding Iraq) actual production is higher than the quota amount. (NYT, Reuters)
- March 12: The near-month (April) crude oil futures price at the NYMEX settles at $37.83 per barrel, the highest near-month settlement price (in nominal terms) since October 1990. This comes as EIA reports today that commercial crude oil inventories for the previous week declined by 3.8 million barrels (600,000 m^{3}) to 269 million barrels (42,800,000 m^{3}). This is below the 270-million-barrels (43,000,000 m^{3}) lower operational inventory level, which, while not implying shortages, operational problems, or price increases, is indicative of a situation where inventory-related supply flexibility could be constrained or nonexistent. This heightens supply concerns before an impending war in Iraq. (WSJ)
- March 19: Military action in Iraq commences with a bombing raid and missile attack on targets in the Iraqi capital of Baghdad (March 20 Baghdad time) by Coalition forces, given Saddam Hussein and his regime's rejection of U.S. President George Bush's March 17 ultimatum. Iraq launches several conventional missiles at Kuwait, but this has no effect on Kuwaiti oil production. However, the Kuwait Petroleum Company does implement an emergency plan to protect its workers and facilities. (Reuters)
- March 23: Outbreaks of violence between soldiers and militants of various ethnic groups in the Niger Delta region of Nigeria prompt three major oil companies operating in the region - ChevronTexaco, Shell, and TotalFinaElf - to shut in operations in the area, totaling about 800 million barrels per day (130,000,000 m^{3}/d). This represents about 40% of Nigeria's total production, including about 768 million barrels per day (122,100,000 m^{3}/d) in the West Niger Delta (all operations there for the three companies) and 50 million barrels per day (7,900,000 m^{3}/d) of Shell production in the East Niger Delta. Employees of ChevronTexaco, which had declared force majeure on its Escravos crude oil terminal three days earlier, return to Nigeria on April 4 to begin a gradual resumption of production. Force majeure is lifted on April 24, 2003. (NYT, Reuters)
- March 24: After Coalition forces have pushed further into Iraq securing most of the southern oilfields over the weekend, Kuwaiti fire fighters are able to enter Iraq and are able to extinguish one of the wellhead fires. Iraq's southern fields represent about 40% of the country's output. Damage is assessed to be relatively minimal. Some pockets or Iraqi resistance in the southern oilfields remain, however. Furthermore, heavy Iraqi resistance in some parts of Iraq gives rise to market speculation that the war could last longer than initially thought. The NYMEX near-month crude oil price rises 6.5%, to settle at $28.66 per barrel, as the war in Iraq as well as the situation in Nigeria have traders concerned. (Reuters, DJ)
- April 4: Coalition forces continue to make progress against the regime of Saddam Hussein in Iraq, with the U.S. military capturing Baghdad's main international airport. Also, according to the U.S. military, 80–90% of Iraq's southern oilfield production is under coalition control, as well as all related export facilities, as of this date. (Reuters)
- April 4: Shell restarts production and development work at the Soroosh and Nowrooz fields offshore southwestern Iran, after shutting down work at the two fields on March 19 because of fears that staff could be vulnerable to intentional or accidental attack, given the fields' proximity to the border with Iraq. Soroosh produces about 60 million barrels per day (9,500,000 m^{3}/d), and the shut down has delayed the coming on line of the Nowrooz field, scheduled for later this year. (DJ, Reuters) )
- April 8: Syrian state oil company Sytrol informs customers that it will cut crude oil term export volumes by around 40% (about 150 million barrels per day (24,000,000 m^{3}/d)) as a result of the halt in Iraqi imports through the Iraq-Syria-Lebanon pipeline that is reported to have been shut down. Sytrol suggests that the reduction will continue for the rest of the year. (WMRC)
- April 14: Pumping on the oil pipeline from Iraq's Kirkuk oilfields to the Turkish port of Ceyhan is halted as the storage facilities have reached their maximum capacity of about 6.5 million barrels (1,030,000 m^{3}). There has not been a loading of Iraqi crude oil at the port since March 20. (Reuters)
- April 14: Tokyo Electric Power Company (TEPCO) shuts down for inspection the last of its 17 nuclear reactors still in operation. The shut downs result from the discovery last year that TEPCO had falsified data regarding reactor inspections, leading to the decision to shut down by Japan's nuclear authorities. Japan's largest power firm said that unless its reactors were started back up, there would be an electricity shortage of up to 9.55 million kilowatts during the summer, when electricity demand hits its peak. (Japan Times)
- April 15: U.S. Secretary of Defense Donald Rumsfeld announces that the U.S. military has shut off an oil pipeline from Iraq to Syria that is alleged to have been carrying 100,000-150,000 barrels (24,000 m^{3}) per day. "We have been told that they have shut off a pipeline," Secretary Rumsfeld told a Pentagon briefing. "Whether it's the only one and whether that has completely stopped the flow of oil between Iraq and Syria, I cannot tell you. ... I cannot assure you that all illegal oil flowing from Iraq into Syria is shut off. I just hope it is." (Reuters)
- April 22: Yukos Oil Company and Sibneft, Russia's first and fifth largest oil companies, respectively, in terms of production, announce that they will merge in a deal in which Yukos will pay $13 billion in cash and stock for Sibneft. The new company will be the world's fifth-largest publicly traded oil and gas company, with a production of 2.4 million barrels per day (380,000 m^{3}/d). The new company plans to become a major player outside of Russia as well. (NYT, WSJ)
- April 23: According to the American military officer in charge of restarting Iraq's oil production infrastructure, Iraq's southern fields have begun to produce again. Four southern wells have begun producing a modest amount of crude oil, but according to Brig. Gen. Robert Crear of the Army Corps of Engineers, southern wells should soon be producing about 170 million barrels per day (27,000,000 m^{3}/d). Initial production would go toward meeting domestic demand, especially as more refineries come back on line. The country's northern oilfields are still offline. (WSJ)
- April 24: OPEC oil ministers, meeting for emergency talks in Vienna, decide to simultaneously reduce crude oil production by 2 million barrels per day (320,000 m^{3}/d), as of June 1, and increase their overall production quota by 900 million barrels per day (140,000,000 m^{3}/d) to a total quota of 25.4 million barrels per day (4,040,000 m^{3}/d). This is a tacit admission that OPEC production is well in excess of the previous quota of 24.5 million barrels per day (3,900,000 m^{3}/d). Iraq does not participate in the meetings and is not subject to the quota regime. (LAT)
- April 29: Brazilian state oil company Petrobras announces the largest-ever natural gas discovery in Brazil. The discovery, located about 85 miles (137 km) off the coast of the state of São Paulo, is a field containing an estimated 2.47 trillion cubic feet (70 km^{3}) of natural gas. This field raises Brazil's natural gas reserves by about 30%, according to some estimates. (Reuters)
- May 22: The United Nations Security Council approves the immediate end of 13 years of economic sanctions on Iraq, dating from the time of Iraq's invasion of Kuwait in 1990. Resolution 1483 effectively grants the United States-led coalition forces control of Iraq until a new Iraqi government can be put in place. The end of the sanctions also makes it easier for Iraqi oil exports to resume without the auspices of the United Nations. Later, on May 27, the U.S. Department of the Treasury lifts most remaining sanctions on Iraq, thereby implementing U.N. Security Council Resolution 1483. Secretary of the Treasury John W. Snow states, "It is no longer a crime for U.S. companies and individuals to do business with Iraq." (WP)
- May 28: Yukos of Russia signs a $150 billion agreement with China National Petroleum Corporation (CNPC), wherein CNPC agrees to purchase 5.13 billion barrels (816,000,000 m^{3}) of oil between 2005 and 2030 via a $2.5 billion pipeline from Russia's Western Siberia fields to China's Daqing field. (Reuters)
- June 2: Shell signs a $2 billion contract with an alliance of Japanese and Russian companies for the construction of Russia's first natural gas liquefaction plant in Sakhalin. This comes after Tokyo Electric Power Company (TEPCO) and Tokyo Gas agreed two weeks earlier to purchase about one-quarter of the liquefaction plant's planned capacity of 9.6 million metric tons per year. Shell owns 55% of the production rights for the natural gas supplying the planned plant. (NYT)
- June 10: Federal Reserve Chairman Alan Greenspan notes that rising natural gas prices in the United States could have a negative impact on the economy in the months ahead if prices remain at high levels. States Greenspan, "I have no doubt that...if we stay at these very elevated prices we're going to see some erosion in a number of macroeconomic variables which are not evident at this stage. A very significant amount of natural gas using infrastructure in the American economy was based on $2 gas. That means a lot of noncompetitive structures are sitting out there." (Reuters)
- June 11: Oil Ministers of the Organization of Petroleum Exporting Countries (OPEC) meeting in Qatar decide to keep OPEC crude oil production quotas unchanged for the ten members (i.e. not including Iraq) participating in the quota regime. The combined output quota for the ten members is 25.4 million barrels (4,040,000 m^{3}) of crude oil per day. OPEC President Abdullah bin Hamad Al Attiyah, also Qatar's Minister of Energy and Industry, says, "We don't want to cut for the sake of it. We should justify it." (Reuters, DJ)
- June 12: Two explosions damage the Kirkuk-Ceyhan oil pipeline, in what is later determined to be an act of sabotage. Several other Iraqi pipelines are damaged in acts of sabotage throughout the month, including a natural gas pipeline in the western desert on June 21, an oil pipeline west of Baghdad on June 22, and the now-stalled Iraq-Syria pipeline on June 23. (Reuters, AP)
- June 14: ConocoPhillips announces that the company will proceed with its $1.5 billion liquefied natural gas (LNG) development project at the Bayu-Undan fields after government officials of Australia and East Timor approved the project in the Timor Sea Joint Petroleum Development Area. Natural gas from the field will be piped to an LNG liquefaction plant in Australia's Northern Territory. (WSJ, NYT)
- June 17: The head of Iraq's North Oil Company, Adil al-Qazzaz, states that Iraq's main north-south crude oil pipeline, the so-called Strategic Pipeline, will not be operable for some time, especially because the K-3 pumping station was badly damaged during the recent war. Al-Qazzaz goes on to state that because the pipeline is not working, "We don't have export flexibility, and that will have an impact." (WSJ)
- June 22: Iraq exports oil for the first time since March 20, the first day of the war that eventually toppled the regime of Saddam Hussein. The crude oil, 1 million barrels (160,000 m^{3}), was part of the June 12 tender and will be sold to Turkish refiners from oil in storage at the Turkish port of Ceyhan. Loading of the oil onto a tanker begins today. (WP)
- July 2: The European Parliament votes to cap European industry's carbon dioxide output and let firms trade the right to pollute. As of January 2005, many plants in the oil refining, smelting, steel, cement, ceramics, glass and paper sectors will need special permits to emit carbon dioxide (CO_{2}). "It means that the largest emissions trading scheme in the world to date will be a reality from 2005, and that the architecture foreseen under the Kyoto Protocol is coming to life," according to European Union Environment Commissioner Margot Wallstrom. (Reuters)
- July 9: The government of Chad announces that it has begun its first-ever crude oil production, as wells began pumping on July 1. It will still take weeks before crude is shipped from the $3.5 billion project through a 650-mile (1,050 km) pipeline to the Atlantic coast in neighboring Cameroon. The government does not announce the initial flow rate, but eventual production is expected to reach 225 million barrels per day (35,800,000 m^{3}/d). Oil begins flowing through the pipeline on July 15. (Reuters)
- July 12: Sakhalin Oil Development Corporation, the Japanese partner in an international consortium in the Sakhalin-1 project, announces that oil drilling offshore has begun. The project, which may eventually see $12 billion invested in oil and natural gas development, is potentially the largest direct foreign investment in Russia. Total recoverable reserves at the Sakhalin-1 area are estimated to be 2.3 billion barrels (370,000,000 m^{3}) of oil and 17.1 trillion cubic feet (480 km^{3}) of natural gas. (DJ)
- July 15: The operator of Israel's Eilat-Ashkelon pipeline, a bi-directional pipeline linking the Mediterranean and the Red Sea, announces that the pipeline is operational. The pipeline, with a current capacity of 400 million barrels per day (64,000,000 m^{3}/d), but a design capacity of 1.2 million barrels per day (190,000 m^{3}/d), provides an alternative to the Suez Canal, as both Israeli ports can handle VLCCs, whereas Suez cannot. Perhaps even more importantly, with the new southerly flow, Russian crude on small tankers from the Bosporus will be able to eventually load onto VLCCs bound for East Asia. (Reuters)
- July 15: Hurricane Claudette hits the Texas coast about 80 miles (130 km) southwest of Houston. According to the U.S. Minerals Management Service, an estimated 2.5 billion cubic feet (71,000,000 m^{3}) per day of natural gas had been shut in by Claudette, or about 18% of the Gulf's total gas output. Also, about 330 million barrels per day (52,000,000 m^{3}/d) of oil, or some 21% of the Gulf of Mexico's daily oil production, has been shut down. Production is quickly restored in the next few days. (Reuters)
- July 16: Italian oil and gas major Eni announces that it has begun exporting oil production from the giant Karachaganak field in Kazakhstan to the Novorossiysk terminal on the Black Sea. In addition, Eni said that it and its partners had completed pipelines and treatment facilities so that output from the oil field could grow by the end of the year to 380 million barrels (60,000,000 m^{3}) of oil equivalent per day from the current 220 million barrels (35,000,000 m^{3}) of oil equivalent per day. (DJ)
- July 16: Shell and Total successfully conclude the first deal with Saudi Arabia giving Western companies access to the Kingdom's hydrocarbon reserves since the nationalization of its petroleum industry. The agreement entails natural gas exploration and development across 77,000 square miles (200,000 km^{2}) in Saudi Arabia's Empty Quarter. Previous efforts to open up Saudi Arabia's upstream natural gas sector, known as "Saudi Arabia's natural gas initiative" and the three "Core Ventures" were larger, with each estimated to be worth $10–$15 billion. The Core Ventures fell apart in June due to conflicts with foreign investors over financial terms. (Reuters)
- July 25: The first delivery of liquefied natural gas (LNG) since 1980 is made to the reactivated Cove Point LNG regasification plant in Maryland, as a tanker from Trinidad arrives carrying 22 million US gallons (83,000 m^{3}) of LNG. According to Dominion, owner of the facility, the plant will be able to supply 1 billion cubic feet (28,000,000 m^{3}) of natural gas per day, and will be the largest LNG regasification facility in the United States. (WP)
- July 31: Oil Ministers of the Organization of Petroleum Exporting Countries (OPEC), meeting in Vienna, decide to keep their crude oil production quotas unchanged until their next meeting, on September 24. The combined quota for the ten members participating in the quota regime (i.e. excluding Iraq) is 24.5 million barrels per day (3,900,000 m^{3}/d). (WSJ)
- August 7: The United States estimates that restoring Iraq's oil sector to its pre-war status will cost at least $1.1 billion and take nine months to complete. Prior to the war, Iraq was producing around 2.5 million barrels (400,000 m^{3}) per day and exporting around 2 million barrels (320,000 m^{3}) per day. Current production is closer to 1 million barrels per day (160,000 m^{3}/d), with exports of about 600,000 barrels (95,000 m^{3}) per day. (LAT))
- August 14: Libya reportedly agrees to compensate families of the 1988 Lockerbie airplane bombing with $2.7 billion total. The money is to be released in three tranches, the first following a lifting of United Nations sanctions, the second after possible lifting of U.S. sanctions, and the third after Libya is removed from the U.S. State Department's state sponsors of terrorism list. (WMRC)
- August 14: A huge electric power blackout hits large parts of the northeastern United States, the Midwest, and southern Canada late in the afternoon. Power is out for at least several hours in major cities like New York, Detroit, Cleveland, and Toronto. Three months later, on November 19, the U.S.-Canada Power System Outage Task Force, led by U.S. Secretary of Energy Spencer Abraham and Canadian Natural Resource Minister Herbert Dhaliwal, releases a 124-page investigative report which concludes that the blackout was "largely preventable" and cites several failures by regional utility companies and regulators. Analyses are also published by The Michigan Public Service Commission and the Electric Power Research Institute (EPRI). (NYT, WSJ, AP)
- August 14: Russia approves a $13 billion merger between Yukos and Sibneft, creating "YukosSibneft," Russia's first "supermajor" and one of the world's largest publicly traded oil companies. (WMRC)
- August 15: Iraq's crucial northern oil pipeline from Kirkuk to the Turkish port of Ceyhan is attacked, stopping flows on the line just two days after it reopened for the first time since the war. The pipeline had a pre-war capacity of 1.1 million barrels per day (170,000 m^{3}/d), but sustained significant damage during hostilities and had started pumping at only around 200 million barrels per day (32,000,000 m^{3}/d). Repairs to the line from the latest attack may take weeks, while full restoration of the pipeline's pre-war capacity could take months. (WMRC)
- September 1: Ibrahim Bahr al-Uloum, a former Iraqi exile, is appointed Iraq's first post-war oil minister by the country's Governing Council. Uloum replaces Thamir Ghadhban, who had been the acting oil minister since early May. (Reuters)
- September 10: The Inter-American Development Bank approves financing for Peru's Camisea natural gas project. The Camisea fields were discovered by Shell in 1986 and are estimated to hold 13 trillion cubic feet (370 km^{3}) of natural gas and 660 million barrels (105,000,000 m^{3}) of condensate, possibly transforming Peru into a net energy exporter. (DJ, WP, WMRC, EIA)
- September 11: The Federal Energy Regulatory Commission approves a plan for the new Cameron liquefied natural gas (LNG) import terminal in Hackberry, Louisiana. Cameron represents the first such project in the United States in over 20 years. (NYT)
- September 12: The United Nations Security Council lifts 11-year-old sanctions against Libya. Development of Libya's sizeable oil resources has been hindered by the sanctions, which were imposed in 1992 in an effort to extradite two Libyans indicted for the 1998 bombing of an American plane over Scotland.
- September 19: Iranian Oil Minister Bijan Zanganeh announces that the deal which granted a Japanese consortium preferential rights to develop Iran's Azadegan oil field has expired. The consortium was granted the rights in late 2000, but had yet to negotiate and sign a contract. The Azadegan field is estimated to hold some 26 billion barrels (4.1×10^{9} m^{3}) of oil. (Platts)
- September 24: OPEC members agree to cut the output ceiling for the ten member countries, excluding Iraq, by 900-million-barrels-per-day (140,000,000 m^{3}/d) to 24.5 million barrels per day (3,900,000 m^{3}/d), effective November 1. Iraq attends the OPEC meeting for the first time since 1990. OPEC cited concerns that the world oil market will be oversupplied in 2004 leading to lower prices. (Reuters)
- September 30: The Chicago Climate Exchange announces its first auction of emission allowances. Although emissions cuts are still voluntary, the exchange is considered an important prototype. (WMRC)
- October 3: Chad's President Idriss Deby announced that the new Chad-Cameroon oil pipeline is officially "onstream." Chad began pumping oil into the pipeline in July 2003 from the Doba field. The $3.7 billion Chad-Cameroon oil pipeline represents the World Bank's single largest investment ever in sub-Saharan Africa. (NYT)
- October 4: The Russian oil companies Yukos and Sibneft complete their merger, creating YukosSibneft, the world's fourth-largest private oil producer. The news is accompanied by rumors that major American firms are interested in making a deal with YukosSibneft to gain access to the Russian energy market. (WP)
- October 14: Bowing to protests, Bolivian President Gonzalo Sanchez de Lozada announces he will not pursue a plan to export more than one billion cubic feet per day of liquefied natural gas (LNG) to the United States through Chile. The proposal had led to massive popular protests in Bolivia, resulting in the deaths of at least 16 people. (WSJ, WP, NYT)
- November 4: The International Finance Corporation, the private lending division of the World Bank, approves a $250 million loan for the Baku-Tbilisi-Ceyhan pipeline. Later, on November 11, the European Bank for Reconstruction and Development approves its $250 million loan for the project. The 1-million-barrels-per-day (160,000 m^{3}/d) pipeline will enable crude oil exports from the land-locked Caspian Sea region to reach world markets through the Turkish Mediterranean port of Ceyhan. (WSJ, EIA, WMRC)
- November 18: ChevronTexaco reports that it has received final approval form the Federal Energy Regulatory Commission (FERC) to build the world's first-ever deepwater liquefied natural gas (LNG) import terminal at Port Pelican in the Gulf of Mexico. The plant will have a capacity of 1.6 billion cubic feet (45,000,000 m^{3}) per day, with construction to begin in 2004 and to be completed in 2007. (WMRC)
- November 21: The United Nations hands over the "oil-for-food" program in Iraq to the U.S.-led administration in Baghdad. The "oil-for-food" program was established by the United Nations in 1995, and used proceeds from the sale of Iraqi oil to buy food and medicine for Iraqis as well as to finance infrastructure and humanitarian projects. Iraqi oil exports reportedly have reached around 1.5 million barrels per day (240,000 m^{3}/d). (USAT, WMRC)
- November 24: The U.S. Congress abandons plans to pass an energy bill before the end of the legislative session. The bill was approved in the United States House of Representatives on November 18, but then blocked in the Senate as its proponents were unable to close debate on the issue and call for a vote. The legislation has been under construction for three years and represents Congress's first attempt at a comprehensive energy bill since 1992. The bill's proponents intend to revisit the issue in 2004. (NYT, WP, WSJ)
- November 28: Russian oil company Sibneft makes a surprise announcement suspending its merger with Russian oil major Yukos citing technical difficulties. The $13 billion merger was announced in April 2003, and would create the world's fifth-largest publicly traded oil company. (WP, WSJ)
- December 2: President George W. Bush signs a $27.3 billion energy and water bill that includes funding for a nuclear waste repository at Yucca Mountain, Nevada. The repository remains a source of controversy between state and federal officials. (AP)
- December 4: OPEC holds its 128th meeting to review oil markets in Vienna, Austria, leaving OPEC 10 output quotas unchanged. (DJ)
- December 15: Oil prices fall 4% on the news that U.S. military forces capture Saddam Hussein near his hometown of Tikrit, Iraq. (CBS, WMRC)
- December 18: BP signs a 20-year deal to sell 500 million cubic feet (14,000,000 m^{3}) per day of liquefied natural gas (LNG) from its Tangguh facility in Indonesia to the U.S. energy company Sempra Energy. The LNG will be shipped to Sempra's proposed import and regasification terminal in Baja California, Mexico before being distributed to buyers in the United States. (DJ)
- December 22: Libya announces that it will abandon its weapons of mass destruction programs and comply with the Nuclear Non-Proliferation Treaty. The United States welcomes the move, but says that it will maintain economic sanctions until it sees evidence of compliance. (WMRC, NYT)

== Sources ==
- Energy Information Administration: Chronology of World Oil Market Events
- Commodity Research Bureau. The CRB Commodity Yearbook 2003, 2003.

OtherSources include: Associated Press (AP), Dow Jones (DJ), Japan Times, Los Angeles Times (LAT), The New York Times (NYT), Oil Daily (OD), Reuters, USA Today (USAT), The Wall Street Journal (WSJ), The Washington Post (WP), World Markets Research Center (WMRC).

| previous year: 2002 world oil market chronology | This article is part of the Chronology of world oil market events (1970-2005) | following year: 2004 world oil market chronology |
