= 2002 world oil market chronology =

- January 1: The OPEC crude oil production quota cuts of 1.5 million barrels (240,000 m^{3}) per day, announced on December 28, officially go into effect for six months. Crude oil production or export cuts of 462,500 barrels per day (73,530 m^{3}/d) by five non-OPEC oil exporters also go into effect. (Reuters)
- January 9: U.S. Secretary of Energy Spencer Abraham announces that the Partnership for a New Generation of Vehicles program, started in 1993 in an effort to develop mass-produced vehicles that would get 80 miles per US gallon of gasoline by 2004, will be replaced by a new program called Freedom Car. The Freedom Car program will emphasize developing fuel-cell vehicles, powered by oxygen and hydrogen, by an unspecified later date.(WP, NYT)
- January 22: The U.S. Department of Energy opens the bidding process for oil companies to deliver 22 million barrels (3,500,000 m^{3}) of crude oil to the Strategic Petroleum Reserve instead of making cash royalty payments. The royalty-in-kind oil is the first phase of the Bush administration's plan, announced last November, to fill the Strategic Petroleum Reserve to its capacity of 700 million barrels (110,000,000 m^{3}). (Reuters)
- January 29: U.S. President George W. Bush delivers his State of the Union address. In his speech he identifies Iraq, Iran, and North Korea as part of an “axis of evil” that supports terrorism. President Bush also states, “The United States of America will not permit the world’s most dangerous regimes to threaten us with the world’s most destructive weapons.” (NYT)
- February 13: Iraq says that it will not allow United Nations (U.N.) arms inspectors to return to Iraq. Iraqi Vice President Taha Yassin Ramadan states, "There is no need for the spies of the [U.N.] inspection teams to return to Iraq since Iraq is free of weapons of mass destruction." The United States has hinted that actions may be taken against the Iraqi government if U.N. arms inspectors are not allowed to return. (Reuters)
- March 6: At a joint news conference, oil ministers of major non-OPEC oil exporters Mexico and Norway announce that they plan to maintain their respective export and production cuts through the end of the second quarter of 2002. This same day, non-OPEC Persian Gulf exporter Oman announces that it is willing to maintain its relatively small production cut through the end of the year. (Reuters)
- March 7: Light, sweet crude oil for April delivery on the NYMEX closes at $23.71, the highest price since September 21, 2001, when oil prices had temporarily spiked because of the September 11 terrorist attacks. Oil prices have been on the rise because of OPEC and non-OPEC production cuts, an improving U.S. economy, and concern over U.S. intentions toward Iraq. (OD)
- March 12: Shareholders of Conoco and Phillips Petroleum approve a proposed $15.6-billion merger of the two major oil companies. The new company would be the third-largest oil company in the United States and the sixth-largest investor-owned oil company in the world. The company would also be the largest oil refiner in the United States. Joint reserves of the two companies are about 8.7 billion barrels (1.38×10^{9} m^{3}) of oil equivalent. (AP)
- March 15: OPEC oil ministers meeting in Vienna decide to maintain their quota restrictions, established January 1, 2002, through the end of the second quarter of the year. On January 1, 2002, OPEC cut its crude oil production quotas by an aggregate 1.5 million barrels per day (240,000 m^{3}/d). (NYT)
- March 20: Russian Prime Minister Mikhail Kasyanov announces that Russia will extend its voluntary crude oil export cuts of 150,000 barrels per day (24,000 m^{3}/d) through the end of the second quarter of 2002. Russia, the biggest non-OPEC oil exporter, had agreed to implement the cuts beginning on January 1, 2002 as a cooperative move with OPEC. Many analysts question whether Russia has complied at all with its pledged cuts, and some data actually points to Russian exports rising since the beginning of January. (NYT)
- April 1: India liberalizes its oil and natural gas sector by putting in place a series of market reforms, including: the end of government-fixed prices for gasoline and diesel; the end of subsidized cooking gas and kerosene prices; market competition for state-run downstream companies; and assigning the Oil Ministry the role of energy watchdog. (Reuters)
- April 2: Royal Dutch Shell agrees to buy Enterprise Oil for $5 billion in cash. This will increase Royal Dutch/Shell's production in the North Sea by 30% and overall production by 6%, according to the company. The acquisition will also add 1.5 billion barrels (240,000,000 m^{3}) of oil to Royal Dutch/Shell's reserves. The company is also assuming $1.15 billion in Enterprise's debt. (NYT)
- April 3: Venezuela sends out its first commercial shipment of 550,000 barrels (87,000 m^{3}) of synthetic crude to a U.S. Gulf Coast refinery. Venezuela's Sincor heavy crude upgrade plant, which was inaugurated last month, refines ultra-heavy crude oil into 32 degree API syncrude. (Reuters)
- April 4: The Angolan army signs a ceasefire accord with rebels of the National Union for the Total Independence of Angola (Unita). The agreement includes amnesty for former Unita soldiers and their demobilization and reintegration into society. The civil war, which began in 1975, has killed thousands of Angolans and taken much of the government's revenues from Angola's substantial oil production and exports. (NYT)
- April 5: Thousands of workers at Venezuelan state oil company PdVSA stay home, close gates of facilities, and engage in protests. This is the largest disruption of PdVSA's operations in 2002, though it is not a full-blown strike by all PdVSA workers. Oil production and refining slows, and two of Venezuela's five main oil export terminals are unable to operate. The government of President Hugo Chávez threatens to militarize PdVSA's operations. (AP)
- April 8: Iraq announces that it will halt its "oil-for-food" exports for 30 days as a "gesture of support" for the Palestinians' struggle with Israel. Iraq also requests that other OPEC countries do not raise production to make up for lost Iraqi exports. Iraqi "oil-for-food" exports had averaged about 1.7 million barrels per day (270,000 m^{3}/d) to date in 2002. Major Arab OPEC exporters Saudi Arabia, Kuwait, and Qatar have expressed unwillingness to join in any embargo. (WSJ)
- April 9: A general strike begins in Venezuela, shutting down many stores and factories and nearly halting oil production, refining, and export terminals. On April 12, Venezuelan President Hugo Chávez is ousted by the country's military after three consecutive days of general strikes during which oil production, refining, and exports — the mainstays of the Venezuelan economy — were seriously affected. Pedro Carmona is named interim President of Venezuela by the military high command. PdVSA operations that had been halted start up again, but rioting begins again the following day. On April 14, Interim President Carmona announces that he has resigned following large, and sometimes violent, pro-Chávez protests and a lack of support among many military officers. Several hours later, Hugo Chávez returns to power in Caracas and states that he never resigned the presidency. (WP, WSJ, Reuters, AP)
- April 24: A summit of the leaders of the five littoral states of the Caspian Sea ends without an agreement on how to divide the Caspian's resources among the five countries. (Reuters)
- May 8: Iraq starts pumping crude oil to its export terminals, following the country's announcement on May 5 that it would end its oil export embargo after one month, i.e., May 8. Iraq also submits price proposals for May crude oil loadings to the United Nations for approval. (Reuters)
- May 14: The United Nations Security Council approves an overhaul of the “oil-for-food” program for Iraq that makes use of an extensive list of “dual-use” goods (goods that could have a military as well as civilian use). Iraq will be able to use its oil revenues, which go into a U.N. escrow account out of which suppliers exporting products to Baghdad are paid, in order to purchase items not on the list. The resolution renews the U.N. program until November 25, 2002. On May 16, official Iraqi news agency INA announces that it will comply with the new six-month tranche of the “oil-for-food” program voted by the U.N. Security Council on May 14, despite condemning the Security Council resolution in the same statement. Iraq officially accepts the U.N. proposal on May 29. (Reuters)
- May 17: Russian Prime Minister Mikhail Kasyanov announces that Russia will not extend its 150,000-barrel-per-day (2.4×10^{−5} km^{3}/d) crude oil export cut, agreed to with OPEC, into the third quarter of 2002 and furthermore, that Russia will gradually phase out the export cut in the remainder of the second quarter of 2002. Russia is the world's second-largest oil exporter. (WMRC)
- May 24: U.S. President George Bush and Russian President Vladimir Putin agree to a major new energy partnership that will entail more investment from the United States in Russia's oil and natural gas sector. The leaders also agree to joint efforts to improve ports, pipelines, and refineries in order to expedite export flow. This could mean more Russian hydrocarbon exports to North America. (NYT)
- May 28: The U.S. government decides to buy back leases for oil and natural gas drilling on the Florida coast and in the Everglades for $235 million because of environmental concerns. Secretary of the Interior Gale Norton has asserted that there are only 40 million barrels (6,400,000 m^{3}) of oil equivalent in the area to be protected, about two days' worth of U.S. consumption. (OD)
- June 20: Norway's Oil and Energy Ministry states that, "The Norwegian government has decided not to extend the restriction on oil production into the second half of 2002." Norway had agreed with OPEC to reduce its crude oil production by 150,000 barrels per day (24,000 m^{3}/d) for the first two quarters of 2002. (Reuters)
- June 25: Russia formally announces that it will raise its crude oil exports by 150,000 barrels per day (24,000 m^{3}/d) in the third quarter of 2002 and thereby, end its agreement with OPEC to limit crude oil exports by 150,000 barrels per day (24,000 m^{3}/d) for the first and second quarter of 2002. Many analysts believe that Russia has already been exporting near capacity for some months. (Reuters)
- June 26: OPEC ministers meeting in Vienna decide to leave their combined output quota, excluding Iraq, unchanged at 21.7 million barrels per day (3,450,000 m^{3}/d) for the third quarter of 2002. It is estimated that OPEC-10 countries (i.e. excluding Iraq) are producing between 1 million and 1.5 million barrels per day (240,000 m^{3}/d) above the quota agreement. OPEC members also agree to appoint Venezuelan Oil Minister Alvaro Silva as the cartel's new secretary general, replacing Ali Rodriguez, who will now head Venezuelan state oil company PdVSA. At the meeting, Algeria requests a larger share of OPEC's total quota, but the issue will not be taken up until the OPEC Board of Governors meeting in August. (NYT, DJ)
- June 27: Mexico announces that it will continue its agreement with OPEC to limit crude oil exports to 1.66 million barrels per day (264,000 m^{3}/d) into the third quarter of 2002. A statement from the Energy Ministry said that the decision was "based on national interests and conditioned upon the future conduct of the world oil market". Mexico is among the five largest oil exporters to the United States. (Reuters)
- June 29: An official at Oman's Oil and Gas Ministry announces that the non-OPEC country will continue its 40,000-barrel-per-day (6.4×10^{−6} km^{3}/d) production cut into the third quarter of 2002. Oman had agreed with OPEC to cut production 40,000 barrels (6,400 m^{3}) in the first and second quarters of 2002. (Reuters)
- July 1: The California State Legislature passes a bill that limits vehicle emissions of carbon dioxide, the first such bill to pass a state legislature. The specific regulations, to be developed by 2005, would take effect on 2009 model-year vehicles. The limits, enacted because of carbon dioxide's putative effect on global climate change, are likely to have significant repercussions beyond California because the State represents some 10% of the U.S. automobile market. Governor Gray Davis signs the bill into law on July 22. (LAT)
- July 3: The supertanker Astro Lupus arrives offshore of the Port of Houston, carrying the first direct shipment of Russian crude oil to the United States. The oil, about 2 million barrels (320,000 m^{3}) of Urals Blend, was exported by Yukos, Russia's second-largest producer and destined for two ExxonMobil refineries in Texas. Yukos hopes to make six such shipments this year. (NYT, WMRC, OD)
- July 26: The U.S. Department of Energy announces that it intends to increase the rate at which the Strategic Petroleum Reserve (SPR) is filled by increasing the “royalty-in-kind” exchange program by 40,000 barrels per day (6,400 m^{3}/d). Under the “royalty-in-kind” program, oil companies deposit oil that is produced on federal leases in the SPR as a form of payment for those leases. (OD)
- July 31: ChevronTexaco announces the resumption of crude oil exports from Nigeria after protests and a fire caused the company to declare force majeure on its exports for a ten-day period. Between 300,000 and 400,000 barrels per day (64,000 m^{3}/d) were temporarily halted. ChevronTexaco has not fully resolved the issues between the company and protestors who disrupt operations. Before the fire, about 110,000 barrels per day (17,000 m^{3}/d) were interrupted at times by protestors. Nigeria's army moved in to prevent protestors from damaging equipment, but declined to remove the protestors from the facilities. (DJ)
- August 2: The U.S. Office of Management and Budget approves U.S. Environmental Protection Agency regulations that authorize new penalties for manufacturers of diesel engines that exceed various pollutant levels, to take effect October 1, 2002. The new rules are part of long-term plan, begun in the previous administration, to require diesel trucks and buses to reduce emissions by 90% by 2007. (NYT)
- August 7: Mexican Energy Minister Ernesto Martens announces that Mexico will continue to limit its crude oil exports to 1.66 million barrels per day (264,000 m^{3}/d), in coordination with OPEC, although Mexico is not a member of the cartel. Mexico is the only major non-OPEC exporter cooperating with the cartel, after Norway and Russia ended their cooperation earlier in the year. (Reuters)
- August 20: The NYMEX near-month crude oil futures price closes above $30 per barrel for the first time since February 2001. Concern over possible conflict in Iraq, OPEC quotas, and declining crude oil and product stocks are among the factors leading to a nine-straight-session rise in NYMEX prices. (Reuters)
- August 29: U.S. Vice President Cheney states that a new round of U.N. weapons inspections in Iraq is likely to be insufficient to guarantee that Iraq has ended its biological, chemical, and nuclear weapons programs. That same day, Iraqi Vice President Ramadan declares that future inspections by the United Nations are a "waste of time", as the U.S. administration has already decided upon "changing the regime by force". (WP)
- September 11: The International Energy Agency's (IEA) monthly oil market report notes that global oil stock levels have fallen to "uncomfortably low" levels that could lead to higher prices and more price volatility in the coming months. According to the IEA, OECD crude oil inventories fell by 790,000 barrels per day (126,000 m^{3}/d) in August compared with July. (DJ)
- September 11: The European Union (EU) releases a plan for coordination of member countries' crude oil reserves, including raising the minimum level of national oil stocks to 120 days of consumption from 90 days and putting one third of reserves into a stockpile which could be drawn on in times of crisis. The European Commission would have the power to release oil from the stockpile onto the market if prices rose to a level that, if sustained for a year, would raise the EU's external oil bill by an amount equal to 0.5% of its gross domestic product. Energy Commissioner Loyola de Palacio predicts that the new system will be in place in 2007. (Reuters)
- September 12: U.S. President Bush addresses the United Nations. President Bush declares in regard to Iraq that "The Security Council resolutions will be enforced — the just demands of peace and security will be met — or action will be unavoidable...and a regime that has lost its legitimacy will also lose its power." (Reuters)
- September 13: The World Bank approves lending for a controversial oil pipeline between Chad and Cameroon. The bank is funding $140 million of the $4 billion project to develop the oil fields of Doba in southern Chad and construct a 665-mile (1,070 km) pipeline to an offshore oil-loading facility on Cameroon's Atlantic coast. (Reuters)
- September 18: Work begins on the $2.9 billion Baku–Tbilisi–Ceyhan pipeline, which will transport oil from the landlocked Caspian Sea to Turkey's Mediterranean coast. The BP-led pipeline will be 1,110 miles (1,790 km) long when completed in 2005. Work begins on the Turkish section on September 26. (Reuters)
- September 18: According to United Nations officials and representatives of the oil industry, Iraq has stopped attempting to impose illegal surcharges on oil it sells through the United Nations’ “Oil-for-Food” program. Though the surcharges have provided funds to the regime, Iraq may be attempting to cooperate more closely with U.N. resolutions in the face of increased scrutiny by the United States and Britain. (DJ)
- September 19: OPEC, meeting in Osaka, Japan, decides that its ten members subject to quotas (i.e. excluding Iraq) will not raise their current 21.7-million-barrels-per-day (3,450,000 m^{3}/d) production ceiling. However, OPEC's communiqué states that OPEC is committed "to taking any further measures, including convening extraordinary meetings when deemed necessary...to maintain prices [OPEC basket price] within the range of $22–$28 [per barrel]." Also at the meeting, Qatari Oil Minister Abdullah bin Hamad al-Attiyah is appointed as the new OPEC President, replacing Rilwanu Lukman of Nigeria. (DJ)
- October 3: Hurricane Lili makes landfall on the U.S. Gulf coast after passing through offshore hydrocarbon production areas and the Louisiana Offshore Oil Port (LOOP). Nearly all offshore production (about 1.5 million barrels per day (240,000 m^{3}/d) of oil production), as well as some onshore refineries, the LOOP and the Capline crude oil pipeline are shut down. Refineries and offshore operations begin to come back on line on October 4, with most operations fully online by the second half of the month. There is little permanent damage. Hurricane Lili struck the U.S. Gulf coast only one week after Tropical Storm Isidore temporarily shut down the LOOP on September 24. (Reuters)
- October 6: A French oil tanker chartered by Malaysian state oil company Petronas is attacked off the coast of Yemen, seriously damaging the ship and killing one crew member. The VLCC, with about 400,000 barrels (64,000 m^{3}) of oil aboard, catches fire. The tanker does not sink, and is towed to port. Later, investigators determine that a terrorist suicide attack by a small boat is the cause of the explosion. The tanker was on its way to load additional oil in Yemen when attacked. (Reuters, DJ)
- October 9: The U.S. Energy Information Administration (EIA) releases data showing that crude oil stocks in the previous week fell to their lowest levels (270.5 million barrels (43,010,000 m^{3})) since the agency began keeping weekly records over 20 years ago. Crude oil stocks have fallen by over 50 million barrels (7,900,000 m^{3}) since February of this year and are now 39 million barrels (6,200,000 m^{3}) below the year ago level and only 0.5 million above the EIA's "Lower Operational Inventory." While not implying shortages, operational problems, or price increases, the Lower Operational Inventory means that supply flexibility could be constrained. (Reuters)
- October 11: The U.S. Senate votes to give President George Bush the authority to use force, if necessary, to persuade Iraqi President Saddam Hussein to abandon programs for the development of biological, chemical or nuclear weapons. The U.S. House of Representatives passed a similar measure the previous day. This moves the focus of debate to the U.N. Security Council. (Reuters)
- November 1: Greece, Bulgaria, and Russia agree to equal stakes in the $699 million Burgas-Alexandroupoli pipeline. The 159-mile (256 km) pipeline will bypass the Bosphorus Strait in order to bring Russian oil from the Bulgarian Black Sea port of Burgas to the Greek Mediterranean port of Alexandroupolis. The pipeline will be able to carry about 697,000 barrels per day (110,800 m^{3}/d). (Reuters)
- November 8: The United Nations (UN) Security Council unanimously adopts Resolution 1441, that Iraq must accept or reject within seven days, giving United Nations inspectors the unconditional right to search anywhere in Iraq for banned weapons. Furthermore, Iraq will have to make an "accurate full and complete" declaration of its nuclear, chemical, biological and ballistic weapons and related materials used in civilian industries within 30 days. The resolution requires violations to be reported back to the Security Council by inspectors before any actions could be taken against Iraq for violating weapons bans. (Reuters)
- November 13: In a letter to United Nations (UN) Secretary General Kofi Annan, Iraq accepts UN Security Council resolution 1441 of November 8, granting UN inspectors the right to conduct unfettered inspections in Iraq, "despite its bad contents". In the letter, Iraq also denies that it possesses any weapons of mass destruction. (AP)
- November 14: The TengizChevroil consortium, a consortium of companies led by operator ChevronTexaco that is developing the estimated 2.7-billion-barrels (0.43 km^{3}) Tengiz oil field in Kazakhstan, announces that the consortium has decided to indefinitely suspend investment in the second phase of the project. Production from the first phase was about 12.5 million metric tons in 2001 (about 249,000 barrels per day (39,600 m^{3}/d)). The second phase would require about $3 billion of investment in order to boost the project's output by about 3 million metric tons per year (about 60,000 barrels per day (9,500 m^{3}/d)). (WMRC)
- November 15: The U.S. Strategic Petroleum Reserve, an emergency crude oil stockpile administered by the U.S. Department of Energy, reaches 592 million barrels (94,100,000 m^{3}), the largest amount in the reserve since it was initiated in 1977. (Reuters)
- November 18: The tanker Prestige, loaded with 24 million US gallons (91,000 m^{3}) of Russian fuel oil, splits in two and sinks 155 miles (249 km) off the coast of northwest Spain. The tanker, flying a Bahamian flag and owned by a Liberian company based in Athens, Greece, spills about 2.5 million US gallons (9,500 m^{3}) of the fuel oil from a crack before sinking, polluting beaches in the region and harming marine life. Fuel oil may continue leaking from the sunken ship. (WSJ, WP)
- November 26: Murphy Oil of the United States announces the discovery of 400 million barrels (64,000,000 m^{3}) to 700 million barrels (110,000,000 m^{3}) of oil in the Kikeh field off the coast of Malaysia's Sabah region on the island of Borneo. This is one of the largest discoveries in Southeast Asia in recent years. (WMRC)
- November 27: Officials of four of Russia's largest oil companies, Lukoil, Yukos, Sibneft, and Tyumen, announce a preliminary agreement for a joint project to build a $1.5 billion Arctic oil port near the town of Murmansk. This would enable Russia to expand ocean-going tanker exports. (WSJ)
- December 2: Business and labor groups in Venezuela, including employees of state oil company PdVSA, begin a strike in order to obtain an early referendum on the rule of Venezuelan President Hugo Chávez. The strike has little effect on its first day, but as the strike continues through the end of the month, oil production, refinery runs, and crude oil and refined petroleum product exports fall dramatically. Several refineries in the Caribbean dependent on Venezuelan crude are also adversely affected. This has a serious impact on the Venezuelan economy, but no agreement between President Chávez and the opposition forces leading the strike is reached by the end of the month. (Reuters)
- December 4: The United Nations (U.N.) Oil-for-Food program is unanimously renewed by the Security Council for another six months, and shortly thereafter accepted by the Iraqi government. The Oil-for-Food program allows Iraq to sell unlimited quantities of oil, with revenues going into a U.N. account that pays vendors for approved goods that Iraq orders. (Reuters)
- December 12: The government of Iraq cancels a $3.8 billion contract with three Russian companies — Lukoil, Zarubezhnest, and Machinoimport — to develop the very large West Qurna oilfield. Although the reasoning for the decision is not made clear by Iraq, it is thought that it is in response to Russian political decisions regarding United Nations inspections and the Oil-for-Food program. (NYT)
- December 12: OPEC oil ministers, meeting in Vienna, decide to raise OPEC-10's (i.e. excluding Iraq) total production quota from 21.7 million barrels per day (3,450,000 m^{3}/d) to 23 million barrels per day (3,700,000 m^{3}/d). OPEC ministers also urge strict compliance with the new quotas in an effort to cut back production, as OPEC-10 production is widely regarded to be exceeding even the new production quota of 23 million barrels per day (3,700,000 m^{3}/d). (LAT)
- December 16: The near-month crude oil futures price on the NYMEX tops $30 per barrel for the first time since October 2, as the general strike in Venezuela impacts the world oil market. Later in the month, on December 27, the near-month crude oil futures price rises to $32.72 per barrel, the highest price since November 2000. (WSJ, AP)
- December 17: The U.S. Department of Energy allows several oil companies to postpone delivery of an additional 430,000 barrels (68,000 m^{3}) of crude oil to the Strategic Petroleum Reserve in an attempt to keep more oil in the market during the strike in Venezuela. The oil companies will have to deliver the oil at a later date. (Reuters)
- December 19: U.S. Secretary of State Colin Powell declares that Iraq is in "material breach" of United Nations resolutions after reviewing Iraq's weapons of mass destruction declaration released December 7 to the United Nations. States Powell: "Our [U.S.] experts have found it to be anything but currently accurate, full or complete. The Iraqi declaration ... totally fails to meet the resolution's requirements." (Reuters)
- December 28: A tanker with 22 million US gallons (83,000 m^{3}) of gasoline arrives in Venezuela from Brazil, providing crucial supplies to the country, as the strike by employees of state oil company PdVSA has meant severe reductions in refinery runs in that country. Crude oil production, that was in excess of 3 million barrels per day (480,000 m^{3}/d) before the strike, is less than 500,000 barrels per day (79,000 m^{3}/d) for many days in December. (WSJ)

== Sources ==
- Energy Information Administration: Chronology of World Oil Market Events
- Commodity Research Bureau. The CRB Commodity Yearbook 2002, 2002.
- Other sources include: Associated Press (AP), Dow Jones (DJ), Los Angeles Times (LAT), The New York Times (NYT), Oil Daily (OD), USA Today (USAT), The Wall Street Journal (WSJ), The Washington Post (WP), World Markets Research Center (WMRC).

Previous year: 2001 world oil market chronology	This article is part of the Chronology of world oil market events (1970-2005)	Following year: 2003 world oil market chronology
