= 2001 world oil market chronology =

Sources include: Dow Jones (DJ), New York Times (NYT), Wall Street Journal (WSJ), and the Washington Post (WP).

January 10 The White House announces that President Clinton will not designate the Arctic National Wildlife Refuge (ANWR) as a national monument prior to his departure from office. Environmentalist groups had been pressing for national monument status for the ANWR to prevent oil drilling. (DJ)

January 17 OPEC agrees at a meeting of ministers in Vienna, to reduce members' production quotas by 1.5 million barrels (240,000 m^{3}) per day. The move comes in response to OPEC members' concerns about declining prices. Analysts expect the actual production cuts to total somewhat less than 1.5 million barrels (240,000 m^{3}) per day, as some OPEC members had quotas above their actual production capacity. (NYT, WP)

February 20 The United States Supreme Court declines to consider an appeal by five major oil companies against Unocal's patent on production of cleaner "reformulated" gasoline sold in California, allowing a lower court ruling in favor of Unocal to stand. The ruling may eventually have effects beyond the California market, as tighter environmental standards for fuels take effect across much of the country.(DJ, WSJ)

February 28 The Environmental Protection Agency (EPA) announces that it intends to proceed with implementation of tighter restrictions on sulfur content in diesel fuel, which were proposed by the Clinton administration. The rule, which will require a reduction of 97% in sulfur content by 2006, has been opposed by many in the refining industry. (DJ)

March 4 Tests in recent days confirm the world's largest oil find in three decades in the Kashagan field in the Caspian Sea. Kashagan is a single reservoir at least 25 miles (40 km) across, and two-and-a-half times the size of the nearby Tengiz field. (WSJ)

March 6 United States Secretary of Energy Spencer Abraham formally establishes the Northeast Home Heating Oil Reserve, a 2-million-barrels (320,000 m^{3}) government-owned reserve to be used in emergency circumstances. (US Department of Energy)

March 15 The world's largest oil rig, located 80 miles (130 km) offshore Brazil and operated by the Brazilian state oil company Petrobras, suffers three explosions. This one platform accounted for more than 5% of Petrobras' total production. On March 20 Petrobras 36 Oil Platform sinks with 400,000 US gallons (1,500,000 L) of fuel and crude oil aboard. (WSJ)

March 17 OPEC decides to cut output by 4% or 1 million barrels (160,000 m^{3}) per day, effective April 1. The cut is aimed at preventing a price collapse in a time of weakening demand. (NYT)

March 26 Kazakhstan's Prime Minister opens an oil pipeline from the giant Tengiz Field to the Russian port of Novorossiysk on Monday, giving the Central Asian producer its first direct link to international markets. The 900-mile (1,400 km) pipeline will carry 600,000 barrels (95,000 m^{3}) of oil per day by the end of the year, and eventually 1.5 million barrels (240,000 m^{3}) per day. (NYT)

April 17 A letter from U.S. Department of the Interior Secretary Gale Norton to Florida Governor Jeb Bush is released, stating that the Bush administration has decided to go ahead with plans to auction 6 million acres (24,000 km^{2}) (24,000 km²) of potentially oil-and-gas-rich seabed in the Gulf of Mexico. The U.S. Department of the Interior estimates that the area contains 396 million barrels (63,000,000 m^{3}) of oil and 2.9 trillion cubic feet (82 km^{3}) of natural gas. (USAT)

April 30 U.S. Vice-President Dick Cheney previews the administration's energy plan in a speech in Toronto, Canada. Cheney, stating that conservation alone cannot solve America's energy needs, calls for increased domestic production of fossil fuels and increased usage of nuclear power to meet America's energy demand. He also calls for construction of new coal and gas power plants, as well as upgrading and expanding of the country's transmission grid. (WSJ, USAT)

May 17 President Bush issues the administration's new energy policy. Among the plan's 105 specific recommendations are calls for reduced regulations to encourage more oil, gas, and nuclear production, tax incentives to boost coal output, and other tax incentives to promote conservation and alternative fuels. The plan also calls for increasing energy assistance to low-income households and for making the electricity grid more interconnected, both domestically and with Mexico and Canada. (LAT, WP, WSJ)

May 18 Saudi Arabia selects the eight foreign companies to take part in its "Gas Initiative," three core venture gas projects that have an anticipated worth of $25 billion. They are: Core Venture 1: ExxonMobil (lead), Shell, BP, and Phillips; Venture 2: ExxonMobil (lead), Occidental and Enron (a joint bid); Venture 3: Shell (lead), TotalFinaElf, and Conoco. The Gas Initiative is the first major reopening of Saudi Arabia's upstream hydrocarbon sector since nationalization in the 1970s. (WMO)

May 21 The Enron Corporation's power generating venture in India, the Dabhol Power Company, serves formal notice that it will terminate its power supply contract and pull out. The $2.9 billion Dabhol project represents the single largest foreign investment in India. The gas-fired plant already had a generating capacity of 740 megawatts and another 1,444 megawatts was scheduled to go on line in June. (WSJ)

May 29 Natural gas futures plunge 6% to a 10-month low on speculation that growing U.S. inventories will help power plants meet summer demand for air-conditioning. The price for June delivery fell 23.5 cents, to $3.738 per million British thermal units on the New York Mercantile Exchange (NYMEX). Natural gas prices had reached a high of $10.10 per million Btu on December 27, 2000, but then fell sharply beginning in late January 2001. (LAT)

June 3 Iraq announces that it will halt crude oil exports in response to a United Nations Security Council resolution, approved May 31, that extends the oil-for-food program by only one month, instead of the normal six-month period. The oil-for-food program affects revenues from Iraqi sales of about 2.1 million barrels (330,000 m^{3}) per day. However, it has been reported Iraq will continue to sell several hundred thousand barrels per day to its neighbors through sales that are outside of the oil-for-food program. OPEC announces that, if need be, it will make up for lost Iraqi production. Oil prices do not change greatly in response to either announcement. (NYT)

June 5 OPEC ministers agree to leave the cartel's oil production quotas unchanged for at least a month, until a scheduled emergency meeting July 3. OPEC had been expected to leave the quotas unchanged until September, but Iraq's suspension of oil exports on June 3 created uncertainty.(LAT)

June 7 BP announces that it will build a new $600-million platform offshore Trinidad that is expected to double the company's production of natural gas there by 2004. BP currently produces one billion cubic feet per day in Trinidad. (DJ)

June 11 Saudi Arabia announces that it has seized ownership, effective June 7, of the 1.6-million-barrels (250,000 m^{3})-per-day IPSA pipeline that had carried Iraqi crude oil to the Saudi Red Sea port of Mu'jiz prior to Iraq's invasion of Kuwait. The seizure includes pumping stations, storage tanks, and the maritime terminal. Saudi Arabia claims that the asset was confiscated as a result of aggressive Iraqi actions. Iraq insists that it still owns the pipeline. (DJ)

June 15 ExxonMobil and QatarEnergy sign a letter of intent for a natural gas to liquids (GTL) project that would be the largest in the world. The plant would have a production capacity of 80,000 to 90,000 barrels (14,000 m^{3}) per day, and would use about 640 million to 720 million cubic feet (20,000,000 m^{3}) of natural gas per day as feedstock. The project is expected to cost between $1.6 billion and $1.8 billion to construct. (OD)

June 30 ENI of Italy signs a $550 million contract to develop Iran's Darquain (Darkhovin) field, with expected production of 160,000 barrels (25,000 m^{3}) per day. This deal may be seen as a test of the U.S. government's resolve to enforce sanctions against foreign companies investing in Iran's energy sector. (LAT)

July 2 U.S. Secretary of the Interior Gale A. Norton states that the Bush Administration will seek to let oil companies drill on about 1,500,000 acres (6,100 km^{2}) of the Gulf of Mexico out of the 6 million originally under consideration. This removes acreage closest to the shores of Alabama and Florida. (NYT)

July 2 The United Nations (U.N.) Security Council, facing an almost certain Russian veto, agrees to postpone indefinitely a vote on the U.S.-led "smart sanctions" package for Iraq, despite support by the four other council members. Instead, it will extend, most likely through the end of the year, the program that allows Iraq to export oil and import food and other commodities under U.N. supervision (WSJ)

July 3 At a meeting of its oil ministers, OPEC agrees to maintain current production quotas. Ministers indicate that, if Iraqi oil returns to the market, they may cut production in response to maintain their desired level of prices. (WP)

July 5 Australia and East Timor sign an agreement to share royalties from oil and natural gas production in the Timor Sea, which separates the two countries. The deal supersedes the former agreement between Australia and Indonesia that divided royalties 50-50, with a new arrangement of 90% for East Timor and 10% for Australia. This agreement clears the way for $7.25 billion in proposed energy projects for the area and further downstream projects for Australia. (WSJ)

July 10 Amerada Hess agrees to acquire Triton Energy for $2.7 billion in cash. Both companies' boards have approved the transaction. Triton Energy is an international exploration and production company with major oil and natural gas assets in West Africa and Latin America. Triton's total proved reserves are estimated at 293.5 million barrels (46,660,000 m^{3}) of oil equivalent. Amerada Hess' total proved reserves are estimated at 1.1 billion barrels (170,000,000 m^{3}) of oil equivalent. (DJ)

July 11 Iraq resumes oil exports, ending a 5-week halt in protest of a U.S. and British-sponsored United Nations (U.N.) Security Council resolution that would have overhauled U.N. sanctions, after this resolution did not come to a vote (see July 2). The oil-for-food program will be extended for five months. (NYT)

July 24 An Iranian warship in the Caspian Sea threatens a BP oil exploration ship off the coast of Azerbaijan. This prompts BP to suspend exploration in the area. The two vessels were in the Araz-Alov-Sharg field 90 miles (140 km) southeast of Baku. Iran claims the field is in Iranian waters. Caspian Sea region countries have been unable to agree on a division of the Sea. (NYT)

July 25 Faced with declining oil prices, OPEC ministers agree to cut crude oil production quotas by about 4%, or 1 million barrels (160,000 m^{3}) per day. The cut will take effect September 1, and is aimed at maintaining the price of the OPEC basket of crude oils at around $25 per barrel. Crude oil futures for September delivery climbed 47 cents per barrel, to $26.78, on the New York Mercantile Exchange (NYMEX) after the announcement. (DJ)

August 3 U.S. President George Bush signs into law the Iran and Libya Sanctions Act (ILSA) Extension Act of 2001. This Act provides for a 5-year extension of ILSA with amendments that affect certain of the investment provisions. ILSA sanctions foreign companies that provide new investments of over $40 million for the development of petroleum resources in Iran or Libya, or that violate existing United Nations prohibitions against trade with Libya. The law allows the president to waive sanctions against a foreign company if doing so is deemed to be in the U.S. national interest. U.S. companies are prohibited by U.S. law from engaging in any commercial or financial transactions with Iran or Libya. (NYT)

August 10 The United States and Great Britain reject a proposal by United Nations Secretary General Kofi Annan to permit the Iraqi government to use $1 billion per year to fund infrastructure improvements and to increase oil production capacity. It has been suggested that without infrastructure investment, Iraq's production could fall significantly over the next few years. (WMO)

September 7 The U.S. Federal Trade Commission approves Chevron's bid to buy Texaco. Texaco must sell its Equilon Enterprises and Motiva Enterprises units in order to complete the $39-billion deal. The new company, ChevronTexaco, will have a market value of over $100 billion, assets of $83 billion, net proven reserves of 11.5 billion barrels (1.83×10^{9} m^{3}) of oil equivalent, and daily production of 2.7 Mbbl (430,000 m^{3}) equivalent.(DJ)

September 11 The largest terrorist attack in world history occurs as 2 hijacked airplanes crash into the twin towers of the World Trade Center in New York City, one hijacked plane crashes into the U.S. Department of Defense's Pentagon headquarters, and another hijacked plane crashes into a rural part of Pennsylvania. The World Trade Center is destroyed, and the Pentagon is heavily damaged. Thousands of people die and economic damage is estimated to be in the billions. Aviation is halted in the United States and all major trading markets (including energy) are closed for the remainder of the week. In Europe, October Brent prices briefly touch $31.05, up from $27.59 the day before. A one-hour trading suspension follows, after which prices start to fall back. The U.S. government blames the attack on Osama bin Laden's terrorist network (NYT)

September 13 Relative calm returns to world oil markets as U.S. retail gasoline prices return to normal levels and Brent crude oil futures fall back to $28.02 per barrel for October delivery after spiking to $31.05 in the aftermath of the September 11 attacks. Also, energy trading by Houston energy companies resumes and limited commercial aviation starts. (WMO)

September 17 Major trading markets in the United States, including the New York Stock Exchange and the New York Mercantile Exchange (NYMEX), reopen for the first time since September 11. (NYT)

September 24 Crude oil and petroleum products futures fall to their lowest levels in nearly two years amid fears that a recession will reduce energy demand. At the New York Mercantile Exchange (NYMEX), crude oil set for October delivery falls $3.96 to $22.01 per barrel, and crude oil for November delivery falls $3.82 to $22.44 per barrel. Over the past six trading sessions crude oil and gasoline futures have fallen more than 26% and heating oil futures have fallen nearly 29%. (NYT, DJ)

September 27 At its two-day meeting in Vienna, OPEC decides to keep its production quotas unchanged at 23.2 million barrels (3,690,000 m^{3}) per day, despite crude oil being at its lowest price levels since 1999. (NYT)

October 7 Crude oil resumes flowing through the trans-Alaska pipeline after workers welded shut a bullet hole that caused 260,000 US gallons (980,000 L) of oil to spill out. The pipeline, which carries about 17% of the United States' oil production, had been shut down on October 4 after being pierced with a bullet in an apparent act of criminal mischief. (DJ)

October 15 The first tanker loading of the new $2.5-billion Kazakh-Russia Pipeline takes place. This is a trial run that informally inaugurates the pipeline. Initial capacity of the pipeline is expected to be 28.2 million metric tons per year (around 560,000 barrels (89,000 m^{3}) per day). The Caspian Pipeline Consortium (CPC), led by ChevronTexaco, runs the pipeline. (Reuters)

October 16 The U.S. Coast Guard lifts a ban on liquefied natural gas (LNG) tankers entering Boston Harbor to makes deliveries to Distrigas' Everett LNG terminal that had been imposed on September 26 in response to the terrorist attacks of September 11. LNG regasified at the Everett terminal normally provides 15%-20% of the natural gas that heats homes and businesses in New England, with the percentage rising to 35% on the coldest days. On October 26, the Mayor of Boston asks a federal court to prevent tankers from entering because he claims there are inadequate disaster response plans. (Reuters)

October 18 Crude Oil for November delivery falls to its lowest level since August 1999 on the New York Mercantile Exchange (NYMEX). Light, sweet crude falls 50 cents per barrel to settle at $21.31 per barrel. Brent crude for. Poor economic prospects in the next few months, and OPEC's inability to respond so far are seen as factors contributing to the sliding prices of crude oil. (OD)

October 29 ExxonMobil announces that a consortium it leads will spend $4 billion over 5 years to develop large offshore oil and natural gas fields in Russia's far eastern Sakhalin region. The fields are estimated to contain 2.3 billion barrels (370,000,000 m^{3}) of oil and 17 trillion cubic feet (480 km^{3}) of natural gas. ExxonMobil will be the operator and own a 30% interest in the fields. Sakhalin Oil and Gas Development of Japan will own 30%, ONGC Videsh of India 20%, Sakhalinmorneftegas-Shelf of Russia 11.5%, and RN-Astra of Russia 8.5%. The total investment could grow to $12 billion over the 30-40 year project life. This is the single largest foreign investment in Russia, as Russia continues to undertake market reforms. (WSJ, NYT)

November 6 Crude oil for December delivery on the New York Mercantile Exchange (NYMEX) falls to a two-year low after OPEC members warn that a downward price spiral could occur if major non-OPEC oil exporters do not reduce oil production. The NYMEX price settles at $19.92 per barrel, down 10 cents per barrel from the low of November 5, and the first time it has been under $20 per barrel since mid-1999. (NYT)

November 10 An agreement is reached at talks in Marrakech, Morocco, on rules for implementation of the Kyoto climate change treaty. Rules for joint implementation projects, the Clean Development Mechanism, and funding for less developed countries are elaborated. The United States does not participate actively in negotiations or agree to the rules. (OD)

November 13 U.S. President George Bush orders that the Strategic Petroleum Reserve be filled to capacity over the next few years. The reserve has a capacity of about 700 million barrels (110,000,000 m^{3}) of oil, and now contains about 545 million barrels (86,600,000 m^{3}) of oil. The Strategic Petroleum Reserve is intended, in the short run, to smooth out price spikes and shortages caused by a supply disruption. (Reuters)

November 14 At its meeting in Vienna, Austria, OPEC announces that it intends to cut its crude oil output quotas by 1.5 million barrels (240,000 m^{3}) per day effective January 1, but only if non-OPEC producers cut their output by 500,000 barrels (79,000 m^{3}) per day as well. The production cuts are an effort to steady or raise world oil prices, which have fallen markedly since September. (DJ)

November 18 Phillips Petroleum and Conoco agree to merge into a new company to be called ConocoPhillips, which would be the third-largest oil and natural gas company in the United States, and the sixth-largest in the world, in terms of production. The company also would be the largest gasoline retailer in the United States and the fifth-largest refiner in the world. Combined total reserves of the new company would be 8.7 billion barrels (1.38×10^{9} m^{3}) of oil equivalent, and production would be 1.7 million barrels (270,000 m^{3}) of oil equivalent per day. The new company expects to be able to compete more effectively with its larger rivals and to achieve significant cost savings. The new company will be based in Houston, Texas. (NYT)

November 29 The United Nations Security Council unanimously approves a resolution extending the Oil-for-Food program in Iraq for another six-month period. This resolution allows Iraq to sell unlimited quantities of oil on the condition that the proceeds are used to buy food, medicine, and other humanitarian goods, and to pay war reparations. This resolution also calls on members of the Security Council to agree by May 31, 2002, on a list of "dual use" items that would require United Nations approval before Iraq could import them through the program. (DJ, WP)

December 2 Enron files for Chapter 11 bankruptcy in the Southern District of New York for 14 affiliated entities, including Enron, Enron North America, Enron Energy Services, Enron Transportation Services, Enron Broadband Services, and Enron Metals & Commodity Corporation. Enron was formerly the world's largest electricity and natural gas trading company, and the seventh-largest publicly traded energy company in the world. Enron also files a $10 billion lawsuit against Dynegy, alleging breach of contract, in connection with Dynegy's November 28 termination of its proposed merger with Enron. (DJ)

December 26 Crude oil prices on the New York Mercantile Exchange (NYMEX) record one of their largest one-day jumps of the year as traders become convinced that OPEC will follow through on production cuts. Prices per barrel for February delivery settle at $20.27 per barrel, an increase of $1.65, or 8.4% higher than the December 21 closing price (the last day of trading before the holiday weekend). Also contributing to the price increase was the return of cold weather to the northeastern United States and forecasts that show that the cold weather pattern may continue. Nevertheless, prices are still considerably lower than one year ago. (NYT)

December 28 OPEC oil ministers meeting in Cairo agree to reduce their crude oil output quotas by a combined 1.5 million barrels (240,000 m^{3}) per day (about 6.5%) for a six-month period beginning January 1, 2002. OPEC ministers also announce that they will meet again in March. OPEC received commitments for 462,500 barrels (73,530 m^{3}) per day of the 500,000 barrels (79,000 m^{3}) per day in cuts that it had requested from non-OPEC exporters, close enough to the target for OPEC to go ahead and implement its concomitant cuts. This month, Russia announced an export cut of 150,000 barrels (24,000 m^{3}) per day on December 5. Oman announced a cut of 25,000 barrels (4,000 m^{3}) per day on December 11, and raised it to 40,000 barrels (6,400 m^{3}) per day on December 20. Angola announced a cut of 22,500 barrels (3,580 m^{3}) per day on December 14. Norway announced a cut of 150,000 barrels (24,000 m^{3}) per day on December 17. Mexico had already announced an export cut of 100,000 barrels (16,000 m^{3}) per day in November. (DJ, Reuters)

== Sources ==
- Energy Information Administration: Chronology of World Oil Market Events

| previous year: 2000 world oil market chronology | This article is part of the Chronology of world oil market events (1970-2005) | following year: 2002 world oil market chronology |
