= Chronology of world oil market events =

== The 1930s ==
=== 1934 ===
- July 14: first oil arrives at the Tripoli terminal of the 12-inch Kirkuk-Haifa oil pipeline
- October 14: first oil arrives at the Haifa terminal of the 12-inch Kirkuk-Haifa oil pipeline

== The 1950s ==
=== 1951 ===
- December 19: first shipment of Zubair oil sails from the new Al Faw terminal.

== The 1970s ==
See: 1970–1979 world oil market chronology

=== 1970 ===
- January 1: US Federal oil depletion allowance reduced from 27.5 to 22.0 percent.
- May 3: Trans-Arabian Pipeline delivery from Saudi Arabia to the Mediterranean interrupted in Syria, driving oil tanker rates to all time highs from June to December.
- September 4 – October 9 Libya raises posted prices and increases tax rate from 50 percent to 55 percent. Iran and Kuwait follow in November.
- December 9: OPEC meeting in Caracas establishes 55 percent as minimum tax rate and demands that posted prices be changed to reflect changes in foreign exchange rates.

=== 1971 ===
- January 12: Negotiations over posted prices begin in Tehran between 6 OPEC Persian Gulf states and 22 oil companies.
- February 3: OPEC mandates "total embargo" against any company that rejects 55 percent tax rate.
- February 14: Tehran agreement signed. Companies accept 55 percent tax rate, immediate increase in posted prices, and further successive increases.
- February 24: Algeria nationalizes 51 percent of French oil concessions.
- April 2: Libya concludes five weeks of negotiations with Western oil companies in Tripoli on behalf of itself, Saudi Arabia, Algeria and Iraq. Agreement raises posted prices of oil delivered to Mediterranean from $2.55 to $3.45 per barrel; provides for a 2.5 percent annual price increase plus inflation allowance; raises tax rate from a range of 50–58 percent to 60 percent of posted price.
- July 31: Venezuela's Hydrocarbons Reversion Law mandates gradual transfer to government ownership of all "unexploited concession areas" by 1974 and "all their residual assets" by 1983.
- August 15: U.S. Government institutes Phase I price controls. Invoking the powers granted to the president by the Economic Stabilization Act of 1970, President Richard Nixon signs Executive Order 11615 which orders 90-day nationwide freeze on all wages, prices, salaries and rents.
- September 22: OPEC directs members to negotiate price increases to offset the devaluation of the U.S. dollar.
- November:U.S. Phase II price controls begin. Plan is to allow for gradual 2–3 percent annual price increases, however, domestic petroleum prices remain at Phase I levels.
- December 5: Libya nationalizes BP concession.

=== 1972 ===
- January 20: Six exporting countries – Abu Dhabi, Iran, Iraq, Kuwait, Qatar and Saudi Arabia – conclude ten days of meetings with Western oil companies. An agreement is reached to raise the posted price of crude by 8.49 percent to offset the loss in value of oil concessions attributable to the decline in value of the U.S. dollar.
- March 11: OPEC threatens "appropriate sanctions" against companies that "fail to comply with ... any action taken by a Member Country in accordance with [OPEC] decisions."
- June 1: Iraq nationalizes Iraq Petroleum Company's (IPC) concession owned by BP, Shell, Compagnie Francaise des Petroles, Mobil and Standard Oil of New Jersey (now Exxon). The concessions were valued at over one billion dollars.
- June 9: In a show of support for Iraq, OPEC moves to prevent companies whose interests were nationalized in Iraq from increasing production elsewhere; appoints mediators between Iraq and IPC.
- September 30: Libya acquires a 50 percent interest in two ENI concessions.
- October 27: OPEC approves plan providing for 25 percent government ownership of all Western oil interests operating within Kuwait, Qatar, Abu Dhabi and Saudi Arabia beginning on January 1, 1973, and rising to 51 percent by January 1, 1983. (Iraq declines to agree.) Agreements signed on December 21.

=== 1973 ===
- January 11: U.S. Phase III price controls begin. Allows for voluntary instead of mandatory price control on all U.S. prices. This does not prevent a sharp rise in heating oil prices caused by a severe winter and shortage of product.
- January 17: U.S. President Richard Nixon suspends mandatory oil import quota on No. 2 heating oil through April 30.
- January 23: Shah of Iran announces that the 1954 operating agreement between a consortium of oil companies and Iran will not be renewed when it expires in 1979. The consortium was formed in 1954 as a means to settle a dispute between a new ministry in Iran and the Anglo-Iranian Oil Company (AIOC). The consortium included Standard Oil of New Jersey, Standard Oil of California, SOCONY-Vacuum, the Texas Company, Gulf, Shell, the Compagnie Francaise de Petroles, and the AIOC.
- February 28: Iraq and IPC reach an agreement on compensation for nationalization.
- March :Special Rule No. 1 reimposes mandatory (Phase II) price controls on the 23 largest oil companies. Smaller companies, representing 5 percent of the market, enjoy uncontrolled prices.
- March 16: Shah of Iran and Consortium members agree to nationalize all assets immediately in return for an assured 20-year supply of Iranian oil.
- March 16: OPEC discusses raising prices to offset decline of U.S. dollar value.
- April 1: OPEC increases posted prices by 5.7 percent.
- April 18: U.S. Government ends Mandatory Oil Import Program. Program, established in 1959 by President Eisenhower, had limited imports of crude and product east of the Rocky Mountains to a percentage of domestic crude production.
- June 1: Eight OPEC countries raise posted prices by 11.9 percent.
- June 11: Libya nationalizes Bunker Hunt concession; Nigeria acquires 35 percent participation in Shell-BP concession.
- June 14: Nixon administration imposes 60-day economy-wide price freeze, superseding Special Rule No. 1 for oil companies.
- August :Libya nationalizes 51 percent of Occidental Petroleum concession and of the Oasis consortium.
- August 17: U.S. President Richard Nixon's Cost of Living Council imposes two-tier price ceiling on crude petroleum sales: production of "old" oil (that produced at or below 1972 levels from existing wells) to be sold at March 1973 prices plus 35 cents; production of "new" oil (that produced above 1972 levels from existing wells and oil produced from new wells) to be sold at uncontrolled prices.
- September 1: Libya nationalizes 51 percent of nine other companies' concessions: Esso, Libya/Sirte, Mobil, Shell, Gelensberg, Texaco, SoCal, Libyan-American (ARCO), and Grace.
- September 5: Conference of less developed countries approves forming "producers' associations", calls for withdrawal of Israeli forces from occupied Arab lands.
- September 15: OPEC supports price hikes and designates six Gulf countries to negotiate collectively with companies over prices. Other members to negotiate individually.
- September :Kuwait rejects gradual participation increase plan, insists on immediate 60 percent participation.
- October 6: Beginning of fourth Arab-Israeli War.
- October 7: Iraq nationalizes Exxon and Mobil shares in Basrah Petroleum Company representing 23.75 percent equity in the company.
- October 8: OPEC meets with oil companies to discuss revision of 1971 Tehran agreement and oil prices. Negotiations fail.
- October 16: The Gulf Six (Iran, Iraq, Abu Dhabi, Kuwait, Saudi Arabia and Qatar) unilaterally raise the posted price of Saudi Light marker crude 17 percent from $3.12 to $3.65 per barrel and announce production cuts.
- October 17: OPEC oil ministers agree to use oil weapon in Arab–Israeli War, mandate cut in exports, and recommend embargo against unfriendly states.
- October 19: Saudi Arabia, Libya, and other Arab states proclaim an embargo on oil exports to the United States.
- October 23: Arab oil embargo extended to the Netherlands.
- November 5: Arab producers announce 25 percent cut in production below September levels. Further cuts of five percent are threatened.
- November 18: Arab oil ministers cancel the scheduled 5 percent cut in production for EEC.
- November 23: Arab summit conference adopts open and secret resolutions on the use of the oil weapon. Embargo extended to Portugal, Rhodesia, and South Africa.
- November 27: U.S. President Richard Nixon signs the Emergency Petroleum Allocation Act (EPAA). Authorizes petroleum price, production, allocation and marketing controls.
- December 9: Arab oil ministers announce a further production cut of 5 percent for January for non-friendly countries.
- December 22: OPEC Gulf Six decides to raise the posted price of marker crude from $5.12 to $11.65 per barrel effective January 1, 1974.
- December 25: Arab oil ministers cancel January 5 percent production cut. Saudi Arabian oil minister promises 10 percent OPEC production rise.

=== 1974 ===
- January 7–9: OPEC decides to freeze posted prices until April 1.
- January 29: Kuwait announces 60 percent government participation in BP-Gulf concession; Qatar follows on February 20.
- February 11: Washington Energy Conference opens. Attended by 13 industrial and oil producing nations. Called by U.S. to resolve the international energy problems through economic cooperation among nations. Henry Kissinger unveils Nixon Administration's seven-point "Project Independence" plan to make the U.S. energy independent. Libya nationalizes three U.S. oil companies that had not agreed to 51 percent nationalization in September.
- February 12–14: Heads of state of Algeria, Egypt, Syria, and Saudi Arabia discuss oil strategy in view of the progress in Arab–Israeli disengagement.
- March 18: Arab oil ministers announce the end of the embargo against the United States, all except Libya.
- May 18: Nigeria announces 55 percent government participation in all concessions.
- June 1–3: Arab oil ministers decide to end most restrictions on exports of oil to the United States but continue embargo against the Netherlands, Portugal, South Africa, and Rhodesia.
- June 4: Saudi Arabia announces that it will increase its participation in Aramco to 60 percent. Abu Dhabi and Kuwait follow in September. Increases are retroactive to January 1.
- June 13: IMF establishes its "oil facility", a special fund for loans to nations whose balance of payments have been severely affected by high oil prices.
- July 10–11: OPEC lifts the embargo against the Netherlands.
- September 6: Saudi Arabia increases its buy-back price from 93 percent to 94.9 percent of posted price.
- September 13: OPEC instructs its Secretary General to "carry out a study of supply and demand in relation to possible production controls."
- Oct-November: Saudi Arabians raise tax rate to 85 percent and royalty rate to 20 percent.
- November 15: International Energy Agency formed in Paris within OECD framework. Saudi Arabia, Qatar, and United Arab Emirates announce a slight reduction in posted prices and tax rates.
- December U.S. Crude Oil Entitlements Program enacted, retroactive to November 1974.
- December 22: Iraq announces plans to increase its production capacity to 3.5 Mbbl/d (560,000 m^{3}/d) by 1975 and to 6 Mbbl/d (950,000 m^{3}/d) by 1981.

=== 1975 ===
- January 1: U.S. Federal oil depletion allowance eliminated for large producers.
- January 13: Business Week publishes Kissinger interview hinting at military action against oil countries in case of "actual strangulation."
- April 7–15: Preliminary meeting in Paris on world economic crisis between oil-exporting (Algeria, Saudi Arabia, Iran, Venezuela), oil-importing (European countries, U.S., Japan), and non-oil Third World countries (India, Brazil, Zaire). Talks collapse after nations fail to decide whether agenda should focus on oil/energy issues or have a broader economic scope.
- April 9: Twenty-four OECD members sign an agreement to establish a $25 billion lending facility to provide assistance to industrial nations hurt by high oil prices.
- June 13: World Bank establishes its "Third Window", a fund to make loans to countries too rich to qualify for "soft" no-interest loans, but too distressed to afford loans at the prevailing normal lending rates. Action represents significant cooperation between oil-exporting and industrial nations.
- September 24: OPEC announces a 15 percent increase in government per barrel revenues as of October 1.
- October 28: Venezuela and foreign oil companies agree on nationalization as of January 1, 1976.
- December 1: Kuwait and Gulf and BP agree on terms of nationalization.
- December 9: Iraq completes nationalization by taking over the BP, CFP, and Shell shares of the Basrah Petroleum Company.
- December 22: U.S. President Gerald Ford signs the Energy Policy and Conservation Act (EPCA) effective February 1976. Authorizes the establishment of the Strategic Petroleum Reserve (SPR), participation in International Energy Program, and oil price regulation.

=== 1976 ===
- February: EPCA 3-tier price regulation begins. Small changes in Entitlements Program.
- April - May: Lebanese civil war causes a drop in Iraq exports through trans-Lebanon pipelines to the Mediterranean.
- May: OPEC issues press release vowing to "take appropriate measures" to protect OPEC interests in light of protectionist actions by certain countries.
- September 1: U.S. stripper well oil prices decontrolled.
- December 14: 640 $3 oil tanker Argo Merchant runs aground on the Nantucket Shoals, spilling 7.6 million US gallons (29,000 m^{3}) of No. 6 fuel oil.
- December: Moderates and OPEC "hawks" disagree on how fast oil prices should rise. Saudi Arabia and United Arab Emirates increase prices by 5 percent, others by 10 percent.

=== 1977 ===
- January: OPEC goes to two-tier pricing (Saudi Arabia and United Arab Emirates use $12.09 per barrel and other OPEC countries use $12.70per barrel).
- May: Fifty percent of Saudi Arabia's 10 Mbbl/d (1,600,000 m^{3}/d) production is halted briefly due to fire damage to separation facility in Abqaiq field. Prices increase slightly.
- July: OPEC prices reunified at $12.70 per barrel as Saudi Arabia and UAE fall into line, then official price rises to $13.66 per barrel.
- October 23: Dry dock complex opens at Bahrain; only facility between Portugal and Singapore capable of servicing VLCCs.

=== 1978 ===
- January: Student protests against government of Mohammad Reza Pahlavi, Shah of Iran, begin, touching off a wave of political unrest and violent clashes between police and demonstrators. Throughout the year increasing anti-Shah activities are led by Muslim fundamentalists seeking to establish a Muslim state.
- March: Amoco Cadiz tanker runs aground off the coast of France, spilling 1.6 million barrels (250,000 m^{3}) of crude oil. (Largest crude spill to date.)
- June Iran and Saudi Arabia block efforts of OPEC price hawks to fix the price of OPEC oil in a currency more stable than the U.S. dollar. Say world economy cannot support associated price increases. Are accused by hawks of being U.S. agents.
- September: Shah puts Iran under military rule. Muslim leader Noori arrested in crackdown of opposition groups.
- October: Iranian strikes; departure of foreign technicians. Pipeline fire drops Iraqi production from 600,000 to 300 million barrels per day (48,000,000 m^{3}/d).
- November: Iranian oil production starts dropping.
- December: Iranian production hits 1.5 Mbbl/d (240,000 m^{3}/d) in mid-December; 500,000 on December 27, a 27-year low. OPEC production rises 1.6 MMBD over two months due to increased Saudi production.
- December 17: OPEC decides on a 14.5 percent price increase for 1979, to be implemented quarterly.

=== 1979 ===
- January: First emergency crude oil Buy-Sell Program allocations.
- January 16: Shah leaves Iran on vacation, never to return. Bakhtiar government established by the Shah to preside until unrest subsides.
- January 20: Saudi Arabia announces drastic cut in first-quarter production. 9.5 MMBD ceiling imposed. Although actual cuts never reach announced levels, spot prices of Middle East light crudes rise 36 percent.
- January 20: One million Iranians march in Tehran in a show of support for the exiled Ayatollah Khomeini, fundamentalist Muslim leader.
- February 12: Bakhtiar resigns as prime minister of Iran after losing support of the military.
- March 5: Iran resumes petroleum exports.
- Spring: Gasoline shortage/world oil glut.
- March 26: OPEC makes full 14.5 percent price increase for 1979 effective on April 1. Marker crude raised to $14.56 per barrel.
- May: DOE announces $5 per barrel entitlement to importers of heating oil. Saudi Arabia announces intention to increase direct sales and to sell less through Aramco. Both announcements send prices higher.
- June 1: Phased oil price decontrol begins. Involves gradual 28 month increase of "old" oil price ceilings, and slower rate of increase of "new" oil price ceilings.
- June 26–28: OPEC raises prices average of 15 percent, effective July 1.
- October: Buy-Sell Program sales average more than 400,000 bbl/d (64,000 m^{3}/d) from October 1979 through March 1980 - highest level since February 1976, due to emergency allocations.
- October: Canada eliminates light crude oil exports to U.S. refiners, except for those exports required by operational constraints of pipelines.
- November 4: Iran takes western hostages.
- November 12: U.S. President Jimmy Carter orders cessation of Iranian imports to U.S.
- November 15: Iran cancels all contracts with U.S. oil companies.
- December 13: Saudi Arabia raises marker crude price to $24 per barrel.

== The 1980s ==
See: 1980-1989 world oil market chronology

=== 1980 ===
- March 1: Windfall Profits Tax enacted.
- May: Saudi Light raised to $28.00 per barrel, retroactive to April 1.
- April–September: Buy-Sell Program allocations drop to average of 120,000 bbl/d (19,000 m^{3}/d) for period April to September 1980.:
- September 17: Iraq breaks 1975 treaty with Iran and proclaims sovereignty over Shatt al-Arab waterway.
- September 23: Iraq invades Iran. Mutual bombing of installations.
- November 10: Iraq captures southern port of Khorramshahr.
- November 20–24: U.N. Gulf War mediator Olof Palme makes first unsuccessful peace shuttle between Tehran and Baghdad.
- December: Collapse of OPEC's pricing structure. Saudis use $32 per barrel marker, others use $36 per barrel benchmark.

=== 1981 ===
Saudis flood market with inexpensive oil in 1981, forcing unprecedented price cuts by OPEC members. In October, all 13 OPEC members align on a compromise $32 per barrel benchmark. Later, benchmark price is maintained, but differentials are adjusted.

- January: Iraq repels first major Iranian offensive.
- January 28: U.S. President Ronald Reagan lifts remaining domestic petroleum price and allocation controls originally scheduled to expire in September 1981.
- April: After meetings in Baghdad and Teheran, attempts by nine Islamic Conference leaders to mediate peace between Iraq and Iran fail.
- August: Windfall profits tax reduced.
- September 27–28: Iran defends its besieged port of Abadan, driving back Iraqi forces.
- October: OPEC reaches an agreement to unify crude price at $32 per barrel through 1982 and sets an ultimate price ceiling of $38 per barrel.
- November 29: Major Iranian offensive mounted on central front.

=== 1982 ===
Indications of a world oil glut lead to a rapid decline in world oil prices early in 1982. OPEC appears to lose control over world oil prices.

- March: Damascus closes Iraq's 400,000 bbl/d (64,000 m^{3}/d) trans-Syrian oil export pipeline to show support for Iran.
- March 11: U.S. boycotts Libyan crude.
- May 24:Iran recaptures Khorramshahr.
- June: Iran demands $150 billion in war reparations; pledges war until Iraq's Hussein stands trial.
- June 10: Iraq declares unilateral cease-fire.
- Jul 13: Iran launches first attack into Iraq.

=== 1983 ===
Oil glut takes hold. Demand falls as a result of conservation, use of other fuels and recession. OPEC agrees to limit overall output to 17.5 Mbbl/d (2,780,000 m^{3}/d). OPEC agrees to individual output quotas and cuts prices by $5 to $29 per barrel.

- March 30, 1983 New York Mercantile Exchange (NYMEX) begins trading in crude oil futures
- April: Iraq increases missile attacks on Iran.
- July 20–30: Iran moves into northern Iraq. Casualties top 13,800 in ten days.
- July 26: U.S. threatens action to preserve navigation in Persian Gulf.
- July–August : Heavy fighting and casualties in Iran–Iraq War.
- October: Iran attacks northern Iraq, threatening Kirkuk–Ceyhan Oil Pipeline.

=== 1984 ===
- February - March: Iran captures Najnoon Islands.
- March 27: Beginning of "tanker war." Over the next nine months, 44 ships, including Iranian, Iraqi, Saudi Arabian and Kuwaiti tankers, are attacked by Iraqi or Iranian warplanes or damaged by mines.
- March–June: Iran mobilizes 500,000 troops to southern front. No offensive materializes.
- May 26: U.S. President President Ronald Reagan rules out U.S. military intervention.
- June: Civilian target truce in Iran–Iraq War.
- October: Norway and Britain cut prices in response to falling spot market. Nigeria follows, renewing pressure on OPEC price cuts.
- October 17: OPEC cuts production to 16 Mbbl/d (2,500,000 m^{3}/d), but agreement is negated by cheating and price-discounting.

=== 1985 ===
- January: Nine OPEC members adjust prices to cut gap between light and heavy crudes from $4 to $2.40 per barrel. Saudi light price cut one dollar to $28 per barrel.
- March 11–19: Iranian offensive; heavy casualties.
- May–June: "Battle of the cities" - heavy bombing from both Iran and Iraq.
- June: OPEC output falls to 20-year low of 13.7 Mbbl/d (2,180,000 m^{3}/d).
- June: Iran begins hit-and-run raids on Iraq.
- July: OPEC loses customers to cheaper North Sea oil. More OPEC price cuts.
- Aug: Saudi Arabia links prices to spot market. Output rises from 2 Mbbl/d (320,000 m^{3}/d) in August to 5 Mbbl/d (790,000 m^{3}/d) in early 1986.
- Aug 15: First Iraqi air raid on Iran's main oil export terminal, Kharg Island.
- November 6: Exploratory well in Ranger, Texas, blows out, spilling 150,000 bbl (24,000 m^{3}) of crude oil.
- December: OPEC output hits 18 Mbbl/d (2,900,000 m^{3}/d) boosting a glut and triggering a price war.

=== 1986 ===
Average world oil prices fall by over 50 percent in 1986. There is wide use of netback pricing in 1986.

- February 3–4: OPEC fails to agree upon a production accord after a two-day meeting in Vienna.
- February: Iran captures southern Faw peninsula, starts northern offensive.
- May 7: Iraq bombs Tehran refinery.
- June: OPEC production-cut talks fail, ending in a tentative majority pact on an average 1986 ceiling of 17.6 Mbbl/d (2,800,000 m^{3}/d).
- June 8: Iraqi jets attack Assadabad satellite station.
- July: Brent price dips under $9 per barrel. OPEC production rises to 20 Mbbl/d (3,200,000 m^{3}/d).
- Jul 27: Iraqi jets attack central Iranian city of Arak. Iran threatens missile attack of gulf states supporting Iraq.
- Aug 2: Hussein offers peace in open letter to Iran.
- Aug 4: Reports of probable OPEC agreement on output quotas sends oil prices higher.
- Aug 12: Iran fires missile at refinery near Baghdad. Iraq raids Iranian terminal at Sirri Island severely disrupting Iranian exports.
- December 19: OPEC reaches an accord that would cut production by seven percent for the first six months of 1987 (from 17 Mbbl/d (2,700,000 m^{3}/d) to 16 Mbbl/d (2,500,000 m^{3}/d)) and would raise prices immediately toward a target world oil price of $18 per barrel.

=== 1987 ===
- January: OPEC price accord begins to deteriorate.
- February: OPEC majors stick to fixed prices.
- Jun-Aug: Gulf war escalates.
- December: OPEC meeting failure.

=== 1988 ===
- February: OPEC price meeting set.
- March: OPEC/Non-OPEC meeting failure.
- July: Iran accepts cease fire.
- October 14: Crude oil prices jump in anticipation of possible production accord at Gulf Cooperation Council meeting set for October 16.
- November 28: OPEC reaches production accord. Six-month agreement to set production at 18.5 Mbbl/d (2,940,000 m^{3}/d). Although the recent OPEC quota had been 19.0 Mbbl/d (3,020,000 m^{3}/d), actual OPEC production had been closer to 21.0 Mbbl/d (3,340,000 m^{3}/d).
- December: Fulmar/Brent outages.

=== 1989 ===
- March: Exxon tanker Valdez runs aground, spilling 11 million US gallons (42,000 m^{3}) of crude oil in the waters of Prince William Sound's Bligh Reef. Oil prices react upward to news of the spill and to potential shortages on the west coast caused by refinery fires there.
- June: OPEC raises their production ceiling to 19.5 Mbbl/d (3,100,000 m^{3}/d).

== The 1990s ==
See: 1990–1999 world oil market chronology

=== 1990 ===
- Aug: Iraq invades Kuwait. Crude and product prices soar upward; exchange markets react wildly to any middle east news events; cash markets dominate prices after trading hours; jet fuel prices rise to record spreads over other products due to increase in defense demand. In late August, OPEC president fails to revive floundering attempts to organize a formal OPEC meeting to discuss crisis/production strategies. Informal meetings held in Vienna result in record price falls. Conflicting reports of promises to increase OPEC output to compensate for embargo of Iraq and Kuwait oil further compound market uncertainties.
- Aug 2: Iraq invades Kuwait. Bush orders troops to Saudi Arabia.
- Aug 27: Market prices plunge as OPEC nears informal agreement to increase output to cover 4 Mbbl/d (640,000 m^{3}/d) shortfall due to invasion. Cash market trading experiences abrupt decline.
- September 6: U.S. citizen is shot in Kuwait. API reports 4.4 Mbbl (700,000 m^{3}) weekly draw in domestic crude stocks. Oil markets surge on aggressive U.S. statements toward Iraq.
- September 21: Reports that U.S. refinery problems will lead to a 200,000 bbl/d (32,000 m^{3}/d) loss in capacity and aggressive remarks by Saddam Hussein send crude prices to new highs.
- September 24: Iraq invades the French and Dutch missions in Kuwait; French President Mitterrand called the action a violation of international law; a U.S. warship boards an Iraqi-flagged tanker bound for the port of Basrah.
- September 18: Crude prices outpace increases in product prices and there is talk of cutting refinery runs.
- September 20: Poor refining margins.
- September 24: Saddam Hussein states his willingness to strike first and his intention to damage oil fields in the region if Iraq does strike.
- October 1: Saddam Hussein says he may be willing to negotiate the occupation of Kuwait and would consider foreign participation in negotiations.
- October 3: API reports a 9 MMB weekly U.S. crude inventory draw.
- Oct. 9: Fear of war and long-term supply disruptions as Hussein threatens Israel.
- October 10: API reports crude inventories dropped by more than 4 MMB in the last week.
- October 11: Libya's Qadhafi says Israel must be eliminated, and U.K. Foreign Secretary Hurd says force would be used if Iraq doesn't withdrawal from Kuwait.
- November 5: Reports of increasing Saudi production and lower world demand.
- November 6: Iran's oil-producing region suffers a serious earthquake.
- November 7: API reports 5 MMB U.S. crude inventory weekly increase.
- November 8: Unconfirmed rumors that Bush would announce an airlift of supplies to U.S. embassy in Kuwait, which could ultimately trigger a military clash.
- November 13: Saudis ask U.S. for rights to bid on SPR crude.
- November 19: Report that Iraq will bolster its forces in Kuwait.
- November 20: API reports crude inventory drop in U.S. of more than 4 MMB; Saddam Hussein announces plans to release German hostages; Soviet Union shows reluctance to endorse the use of force against Iraq.
- November 21: French President François Mitterrand voices support of a proposed U.N. resolution that would authorize the use of force in the Persian Gulf.
- November 26: U.S. proposes addition to U.N. resolution that would require Iraq's withdrawal from Kuwait by January 1.
- November 29: U.N. Security Council approves U.S.-sponsored resolution authorizing the use of force in the Persian Gulf if Iraq does not withdrawal from Kuwait by Jan. 15, 1991.
- November 30: U.S. President George H. W. Bush offers to send Secretary of State James Baker to Baghdad to meet with Hussein.
- December 4: An Iraqi official reports that Iraq will withdraw if it can retain control of the Rumailah field and keep Bubiyan and Werbah islands; also says that demands that the Palestinian issue be treated separately would not be surmountable.
- December 5: Iraq announces willingness to speak with U.S. about resolving the Persian Gulf crisis.
- December 13: Secretary of State Baker questions Iraq's seriousness about Middle East peace.
- December 18: Bush reiterates his "no concessions" stance against Iraq.

=== 1991 ===
- January 4: Reports Iraq will accept U.S. offer for talks in Geneva.
- January 7: Saddam Hussein prepares his troops for what he says will be a long violent war against the U.S.
- January 9–14: At Geneva talks, Baker says that "regrettably" Iraqi Foreign Minister Aziz has indicated no softening in Iraq's position. Peace talks break down, but there is still talk of a peaceful solution to the crisis.
- January 15: Report that Iraq has a new peace initiative.
- January 16: U.S. begins air attack against Iraqi military targets. President Bush directs drawdown of Strategic Petroleum Reserve (SPR). U.S. Secretary of Energy James Watkins orders 33.75 MMB drawdown. Crude oil prices drop $9–10 per barrel in one day after having risen $3–5 per barrel during the first half of January.
- January 17: Reports of early U.S. and allied success against Iraqi forces; DOE issues SPR sales notice.
- January 18: Iraqi Scud missiles land in Israel.
- January 22: Kuwaiti oil facilities are destroyed by Iraq and more Iraqi missile attacks on Saudi Arabia.
- January 30:DOE selects 13 firms to purchase 17.3 MMB of SPR crude oil.
- February: Surplus of unsold oil held by oil producers reaches 80–90 MMB.
- February 5: First SPR oil delivered to commercial buyers.
- February 15: Daily market volatility as Hussein mentions withdrawal, but Bush calls his offer a "cruel hoax."
- February 26: Signs of Iran crude now an option for U.S. refiners, but no imports from Iran likely in near future.
- February 28: War ends. U.N. troops move into Kuwait City. Saddam Hussein orders troops out of Kuwait. Iraqi soldiers ignite Kuwaiti oil fields during their retreat.
- March 1: News that Kuwait will need to import crude in the short term.
- March 12: OPEC announces production cut to 22.3 Mbbl/d (3,550,000 m^{3}/d).
- March 13: API reports a 6 MMB weekly domestic crude inventory draw; Saudi Arabia and Iran say OPEC production cuts will take effect April 1.
- March 19: Gorbachev says the Soviet Union will cut its oil exports by nearly half.
- March 25: Nigerian crude becomes competitive in U.S. Gulf Coast as Nigeria cuts crude prices.
- April 25: Iraq expects to resume crude and product exports by July.
- June 3: Kuwait asks GCC members to produce 800,000 bbl/d (130,000 m^{3}/d) of oil on its behalf.
- Aug: Unsuccessful coup attempt against Soviet President Gorbachev has minimal effect on oil markets.
- Oct: Soviet Union suspends petroleum product exports as its fuel shortages grow. NYMEX futures price for WTI climbs nearly $2, ending at $24 per barrel.
- November: Last of Kuwait oil well fires extinguished by well control teams.
- November: U.S. Senate filibuster causes withdrawal of an Alaska National Wildlife Refuge (ANWR) pro-leasing bill.
- December: Soviet Union collapses as a series of events precipitated by Ukrainian vote for independence leads to formation of Commonwealth of Independent States (CIS).

=== 1992 ===
- January: Kuwait reports oil production of 400,000 bbl/d (64,000 m^{3}/d); insists on restoration of its pre-invasion OPEC quota of 1.5 Mbbl/d (240,000 m^{3}/d).
- March: United Nations threatens sanctions against Libya for its refusal to extradite suspected terrorists.
- March: CIS announces that 1991 crude exports dropped by 52%.
- May: Saudi Arabia supports a crude oil price hike during a late-month OPEC meeting. NYMEX Futures prices exceed $22 per barrel.
- Oct: OPEC production reaches highest level in more than a decade at 25.25 Mbbl/d (4,014,000 m^{3}/d).
- December: U.S.A., Mexico, and Canada sign the North American Free Trade Agreement (NAFTA).

=== 1993 ===
- July: Oil prices plunge on speculation that Iraq will accept U.N. missile test site inspections and receive approval to resume oil exports.
- November: Combination of OPEC overproduction, surging North Sea output, and weak demand lowers the price of Brent to near $15 per barrel.

=== 1994 ===
- April: Oil Prices firm on strength of institutional shifting of U.S. investment funds from equity and bond markets to cash and commodities.
- Apr-September: Nigerian production disrupted by oil workers' strike in response to imprisonment of apparent winner of presidential elections.

=== 1995 ===
- January 14: Mexico pledges profits from state-owned Pemex's $7-billion-per-year oil revenues in an effort to secure U.S. congressional approval of $40-billion worth of loan guarantees. Subsequently, President Clinton approved a $20-billion U.S. aid package for Mexico. (DMN)
- January 30: Norway's Statoil announces that a newly formed consortium of 11 oil companies will develop a plan to supply Norwegian natural gas to the European continent. Three Norwegian companies recently signed a contract with Gaz de France to bring 1.4 trillion cubic feet (40 km^{3}) of Norwegian gas to France between 2001 and 2027. (DJ)
- February 28: The Pentagon announces that it monitored Iranian installation of surface-to-air Hawk missiles in the Strait of Hormuz. The Iranians also have taken possession of and fortified the nearby Abu Musa and the Tunb Islands, which are claimed by both Iran and the United Arab Emirates (UAE). (DJ)
- June 14: After OPEC's semi-annual meeting in Vienna, President Ida Bagus Sudjana discloses the Organization's intention to roll over its present crude oil production ceiling of 24.52 million barrels per day (3,898,000 m^{3}/d). The announcement is followed by a trip to Norway by Saudi Arabian Oil Minister Hisham M. Nazer. Upon arriving, the Saudi Minister asks Norwegian Minister of Industry and Energy Jens Stoltenberg to restrain his country's oil production in the hopes of stabilizing world oil prices. (FT, DJ)
- June 30: Exxon signs a $15.2-billion deal to develop oil and gas fields near Russia's Sakhalin Island. The Sakhalin I project will develop the offshore Shayvo, Odoptu, and Arkutun-Dagi fields that together are estimated to contain 2.5 billion barrels (400,000,000 m^{3}) of crude oil and 15 trillion cubic feet (420 km^{3}) of natural gas. Exxon has a 30 percent stake in the project. (NYT, DJ)
- July 6: Venezuela's Congress approves the country's first investment law allowing for foreign participation in oil exploration and production. The newly passed "model agreement" authorizes the state-owned oil company Petroleos de Venezuela S.A. (PDVSA) to offer 10 exploration blocks to foreign investors. If oil is discovered, the government will maintain a majority stake in any joint venture formed to develop the new fields. (FT, DJ)
- July 27: Saudi Aramco awards the giant Shaybah oil field development project to U.S.-based Parsons Corporation. The $2.5-billion project will develop the 7-billion-barrels (1.1 km^{3}) field, including the construction of crude oil production facilities, gas-oil separation plants, and a 372-mile (599 km) pipeline. The Shaybah field is located on the Saudi-UAE border and is expected to produce 500 million barrels per day (79,000,000 m^{3}/d) after it comes on line in 1999. (PON)
- July 28: Norwegian Finance Minister Sigbjorn Johnsen says that Norway should not lower its crude oil production in an attempt to boost world oil prices. Norwegian Oil Minister Jens Stoltenberg believes production cuts may be necessary if prices begin to fall. Minister Johnsen's remarks follow last month's visit by Saudi Arabian Oil Minister Hisham M. Nazer, who asked Minister Stoltenberg to cut Norway's crude oil production. (PON)
- Aug. 2: Saudi Arabia's King Fahd issues a decree replacing all members of the Council of Ministers who do not have blood ties so the royal Family. While most of the council's top positions are unaffected by the reshuffling, Oil Minister Hisham Nazer is replaced with Ali bin Ibrahim al-Naimi. (WSJ)
- Aug. 14: Iran's official news agency, IRNA, reports that Iran has been unable to sell 200 million barrels per day (32,000,000 m^{3}/d) of crude oil since the imposition of a unilateral oil embargo by the U.S. Iran increasingly has sold its crude oil on spot markets as opposed to long-term contracts. Larger purchases by France, Spain, Italy, China, India, Pakistan, and Thailand have failed to offset decreased demand by German and Japanese refiners. Before the U.S. embargo was announced in April 1995, U.S. companies were buying between 400,000 and 450 million barrels per day (72,000,000 m^{3}/d), down from roughly 600 million barrels per day (95,000,000 m^{3}/d) in 1994. (PON)
- August 28: Kuwaiti Oil Minister Abdul Mohsen al-Medej announces that his country will increase its oil production capacity to as much as 3.5 million barrels per day (560,000 m^{3}/d) by 2005. (DJ)
- September 13: The Kuwaiti Oil Ministry states its intention to seek a 200-million-barrels-per-day (32,000,000 m^{3}/d) increase to its current 2-million-barrels-per-day (320,000 m^{3}/d) crude oil production quota at the November 1995 OPEC meeting in Vienna. The announcement comes amidst growing non-OPEC oil production and weak oil prices. (DJ)
- November 22: OPEC states that it will roll over its current oil production quota of 25.42 million barrels per day (4,041,000 m^{3}/d). The roll-over was widely anticipated because of slack world oil demand, rising non-OPEC production, and weak prices. (DJ, PON)
- November 29: U.S. President Bill Clinton approves legislation lifting a 22-year-old ban on exports of oil from the Alaskan North Slope (ANS). The ban was imposed after the oil embargo by Arab oil producers in 1973. The lifting of the ban opened up about one-quarter of U.S. crude oil production for export, although no more than 7% of ANS crude was ever exported and exports ceased in 2000. The ANS legislation also waives royalty payments on deep water oil and gas leases in the Gulf of Mexico. (WP)
- December 12: Speaking in New York during a U.S. visit by Angolan President Eduardo dos Santos, Joaquim David, president of the state-owned oil company, Sonangol, states that Angola will increase its crude oil production by 10 percent per year over the next five years, reaching 720 million barrels per day (114,000,000 m^{3}/d) by the end of 1996 and 1 million barrels per day (160,000 m^{3}/d) by 2001. The statement comes amidst sporadic violence involving government forces and the rebel group UNITA, less than a year after a peace accord was signed ending the country's 20-year-old civil war. At the end of 1995, Angola had raised its crude oil production to 690 million barrels per day (110,000,000 m^{3}/d). (PON, DJ)

=== 1996 ===
Sources include: Dow Jones (DJ), Financial Times (FT), New York Times (NYT), and Platt's Oilgram News (PON), Washington Post (WP), and the Wall Street Journal (WSJ).

- January 17: Iraq agrees to talks concerning a U.N. plan to allow for the Iraqi sale of $1 billion of oil for 90 days for a 180-day trial period. Under U.N. Resolution 986, proceeds from the sale would be used for humanitarian purposes. In the past, Iraq has opposed clauses 6 and 8b contained in Resolution 986. Clause 6 stipulates that oil exports under this plan must pass through the 1.6 Mbbl/d (250,000 m^{3}/d) Iraq-Turkey pipeline, which currently is unusable because of sludge build-ups and pumping station damage. By most estimates, the line would take a minimum of three months to repair. Clause 8b states that part of the proceeds from the sales would be disbursed under U.N. supervision to Kurdish provinces in northern Iraq. Negotiations between Iraq and the United Nations are scheduled to begin February 6, 1996. (FT, PON, DJ)
- January 30: Vice Admiral Scott Redd, commander of the U.S. Fifth Fleet based in the Persian Gulf, states that Iran test-fired a new anti-ship missile near the Strait of Hormuz on January 6. The missile reportedly has a range of 60 miles (100 km) and is viewed as a threat to regional security by U.S. naval forces operating in the area. Oil tankers carry about 15 Mbbl/d (2,400,000 m^{3}/d) through the Strait. (DJ)
- April 24: In New York, the United Nations and Iraq end a third round of negotiations over Iraq's possible sale of $1 billion of oil for 90 days for a 180-day trial period. Under U.N. Resolution 986, proceeds from the sale would be used for humanitarian purposes. While both sides have reached agreement on most of the key issues, chief Iraqi negotiator Abdul Amir al-Anbari says that the United States and the United Kingdom have fundamentally altered the text of a proposed agreement which he had received from the United Nations early in the third round. Al-Anbari states that the changes have postponed any possible deal. The U.N.-Iraq talks are scheduled to restart on May 10. (DJ)
- April 30: In the United States, President Clinton approves the sale of $227 million of crude oil from the Strategic Petroleum Reserve. At current oil prices, roughly 12 million barrels (1,900,000 m^{3}) would be sold. The Clinton Administration hopes that the sale will lower gasoline prices in the United States, which are at their highest levels in five years. (WSJ)
- May 20: In New York, the United Nations and Iraq agree to U.N. Resolution 986, which provides Iraq with the opportunity to sell $1 billion of oil for 90 days for a 180-day trial period. Under the resolution, proceeds from the sale would be used for humanitarian purposes. The agreement comes following months of heated negotiations. Iraqi oil exports are expected to begin by the Fall of 1996, after a pumping station on the Iraq-Turkey pipeline is repaired and U.N monitoring and aid distribution facilities are put in place. Shortly after the agreement, the White House announces its decision to allow U.S. oil companies to purchase Iraqi oil exports. (FT, PON, WSJ)
- June 11: Exxon states that it will soon begin work on its $15-billion Sakhalin I oil and natural gas development in Russia's Far East. The Sakhalin I project will develop an estimated 5 billion barrels (790,000,000 m^{3}) of oil and 15 trillion cubic feet (420 km^{3}) of gas located in three offshore hydrocarbon fields. The $300 million appraisal program will include drilling one exploration well and conducting a 3-D seismic survey. The U.S. company says that it will start working despite ongoing differences with the Russian government over the country's new production sharing law, which is widely viewed as not offering adequate legal protection for foreign investment in the country's oil and gas sectors. (FT)
- June 20: The Venezuelan Congress approves eight, multibillion-dollar, profit-sharing deals which allow foreign oil companies to explore and produce oil in Venezuela for the first time since the country's 1975 nationalization of the oil industry. The deals could boost Venezuela's current oil production by 500,000 bbl/d (79,000 m^{3}/d) by 2005. Foreign oil companies such as Amoco and British Petroleum are expected to sign final deals with state-owned PdVSA within 10 days and may begin working on their new land by the third quarter of 1996. The eight blocks are estimated to hold between 7 and 11 billion barrels (1.7×10^{9} m^{3}) of light crude oil reserves. (PON, DJ)
- July 7: OPEC issues a resolution announcing Gabon's withdrawal from the organization, effective January 1, 1995. Gabon had an OPEC quota of 287,000 bbl/d (45,600 m^{3}/d). (FT)
- July 18: The United Nations formally approves an Iraqi aid distribution plan, a major step forward in the direction of allowing Iraq to sell oil under Resolution 986. (DJ)
- August 6: U.S. President Bill Clinton signs a new bill imposing sanctions on non-U.S. companies which invest over $40 million a year in the energy sectors of either Iran and Libya. Under the law, the President would be required to impose at least two of the following sanctions: import and export bans; lending embargoes from U.S. banks; a ban on U.S. procurement of goods and services from sanctioned companies; and a denial of U.S. export financing. The European Union stated its opposition to the U.S. law and threatened retaliation. (FT)
- August 21: In Venezuela, a subsidiary of state-owned Petroleos de Venezuela (PdVSA), Corpoven, signs a memorandum of understanding (MOU) with U.S.-based ARCO. The MOU provides for a $3.5-billion joint venture to develop and upgrade roughly 200,000 bbl/d (32,000 m^{3}/d) of crude oil from the country's 270-billion Orinoco Heavy Oil Belt. The project will produce 9° API gravity crude oil in the Hamaca region and upgrade it to 25° API for export to U.S. refineries. The project will be implemented in three phases, the last of which will be completed in 2006. Another PdVSA subsidiary, Maraven, recently signed another, similar deal with Conoco. (PON, FT)
- September 5: Following U.S. cruise missile strikes on military facilities in southern Iraq, crude oil prices rise as the market speculates when Iraq will begin exporting oil under U.N. Resolution 986. Benchmark Brent Blend for October rises above $22/barrel amidst the uncertainty. The U.S. attack follows an Iraqi-supported invasion of Kurdish safe haven areas in the country's northern area. Subsequently, President Bill Clinton states that the U.N. oil-for-food sale should be postponed indefinitely. (DJ)
- October 30: Exxon confirms that it is in talks with state-owned Qatar General Petroleum Corporation concerning the application of new technology to convert natural gas to petroleum products. Exxon believes that technology developed in a successful 200 bbl/d (32 m^{3}/d) Anatural gas refinery project in Texas would work in Qatar, where a proposed $1-billion plant would be able produce between 50,000 bbl/d (7,900 m^{3}/d) and 100,000 bbl/d (16,000 m^{3}/d) of middle distillate products. Under the proposal, Qatar's 270 trillion cubic feet (7,600 km^{3}) North field would supply between 0.5×10^{9} cu ft (14,000,000 m^{3}) and 1×10^{9} cu ft (28,000,000 m^{3}) per day of gas for use as feedstock. In the past, technological barriers and high costs have precluded the development of natural gas refineries. (WSJ)
- December 18: During a press conference, Iranian Deputy Foreign Minister Abbas Maleki states that Iran supports the free flow of oil through the Strait of Hormuz, but reserves the option of closing off the shipping route if it is threatened. Iran recently has admitted to deploying anti-aircraft and anti-ship missiles on Abu Musa, an island strategically located near the Strait of Hormuz's shipping lanes. (DJ)
- December 30: The United Nations announces that a total of 21 contracts have been approved for the limited Iraqi oil sales under U.N. Resolution 986. The approved contracts will allow for 43.68 million barrels (6,945,000 m^{3}) of oil to be exported in the first 90 days of the sale. At present, exports of 26.37 million barrels (4,192,000 m^{3}) have been approved for the second 90-day period of the sale, which allows Iraq to sell up to $1 billion worth of oil every 90 days for an initial 6-month period. In mid-December 1996, Iraq restarted the Kirkuk–Ceyhan pipeline, which is expected to carry up to 450,000 bbl/d (72,000 m^{3}/d) of oil under the sales agreements approved so far under U.N. Resolution 986. Iraq's remaining oil exports will flow through the Mina al-Bakr terminal. (NYT, DJ)

=== 1997 ===
Sources include: Dow Jones (DJ), New York Times (NYT), and the Washington Post (WP).

- February 5: Japan's Ministry of Finance announces plans to cut import tariffs on crude oil and most petroleum products from April 1, 1997, in a phased process that will reduce the country's crude oil import tariff rate to zero in April 2002. (DJ)
- February 24: Qatar inaugurates the world's largest liquefied natural gas (LNG) exporting facility and formally launches Qatar Liquefied Gas Co., which will have total output capacity of 6 million tons per year of LNG. The facilities are part of a new $7.2 billion industrial zone which also includes a sea port with a capacity to handle 25–30 million tons of LNG annually. Qatar plans to build more gas liquefaction plants in the area to exploit its natural gas reserves of around 237 trillion cubic feet (6,700 km^{3}). (DJ)
- April 1: A Shell spokesman confirms the company will declare force majeure at its Nigerian Bonny terminal due to local protests which disrupted 210 million barrels per day (33,000,000 m^{3}/d) of the company's oil production. Although the protests have ended and production is returning to normal, the backlog is temporarily delaying loadings by 3 days. (DJ)
- May 16: A final agreement creating the Caspian Pipeline Consortium (CPC) is signed by project participants: Russia (24 percent), Kazakhstan (19 percent), Chevron Corp. (15 percent), AO Lukoil/Arco Corp. (12.5 percent), Mobil Corp. (7.5 percent), AO Rosneft/Shell Corp. (7.5 percent), Oman (7 percent), Agip SpA (2 percent), British Gas PLC (2 percent), Oryx Corp. (1.75 percent), and Kazakhstan Pipeline Ventures, a joint venture of Kazakhstan's state oil company and Amoco Corp. (1.75 percent). The Russian government plans to transfer its stake to two Russian oil companies, AO Lukoil and AO Rosneft. CPC plans to begin building a 932-mile (1,500 km) pipeline to transport crude oil from the Caspian region to Russia's Black Sea coast in 1998 and begin shipping around 558 million barrels per day (88,700,000 m^{3}/d) of oil in 1999 (planned peak capacity is 1.4 million barrels per day (220,000 m^{3}/d)). (DJ)
- May 20: U.S. President Bill Clinton signs an executive order barring new U.S. investment in Burma (also known as Myanmar), effective May 21 and renewable annually. U.S. companies have invested about $250 million in Burma, primarily in the oil and gas sector. The biggest U.S. investor is Unocal, which is building (with France's Total) a $1.2 billion pipeline from Burma's Yadana natural gas field to an electric power plant in Thailand. (DJ)
- June 4: In a unanimous vote, the United Nations Security Council renews for another 180-day period its "oilforfood" initiative with Iraq. Under the resolution, Iraq may sell $2 billion worth of oil to buy food, medicine and other necessities to alleviate civilian suffering under the sanctions imposed when it invaded Kuwait in 1990. (WP)
- July 22: The first shipments of oil produced from Kazakhstan's Tengiz field arrive at terminals on the Black Sea in Novorossiysk (Russia) and Batumi (Georgia) for subsequent export through the Bosphoros Strait. Volumes total between 100,000 and 150 million barrels per day (24,000,000 m^{3}/d). (DJ)
- July 23: The U.S. State Department rules that Turkey's August 1996 agreement to purchase $23 billion worth of natural gas from Iran over a 20-year period does not violate the Iran and Libya Sanctions Act. In a May 1997 memorandum of understanding with Iran and Turkmenistan, Turkey modified the original arrangement so that the natural gas will be purchased from Turkmenistan rather than Iran. (DJ)
- August 4: In Colombia, Occidental Petroleum, a California-based international oil company, and Ecopetrol, Colombia's national oil company, declare force majeure on all oil exports from the Cano Limon field. The declaration comes after a series of attacks dating back to July 30 knocked out a major oil pipeline transporting oil from the field to the Caribbean port of Covenas. The pipeline has been attacked 45 times this year which is equal to the total number of attacks for 1996. Responsibility for the attacks has not been determined, but leftist guerrillas from the National Liberation Army are usually blamed for such attacks. The force majeure declaration does not apply to the oil contained in the 2-million-barrels (320,000 m^{3}) storage facility at Covenas. (DJ)
- August 8: The United Nations approves a sale-price formula for Iraqi crude oil sales under the oil-for-food plan. The approval cleared the way for Iraq to resume limited oil exports immediately through the Turkish port of Ceyhan on the Mediterranean Sea and Iraq's Gulf port of Mina al-Bakr. The United Nations will also begin reviewing contracts for Iraqi crude oil purchases. Iraq has until September 5 to raise the $1.07 billion allowed under the existing 90 day oil-for-food plan window. Iraqi officials state they will boost exports to 2 million barrels per day (320,000 m^{3}/d) to meet the sales target. However, industry experts say that Iraq's export capacity is untested beyond 1.4-million-barrels-per-day (220,000 m^{3}/d). (DJ)
- September 12: The United Nations Security Council passes a resolution that allows Iraq to reach the $2.14 billion oil sales limit under its oil-for-food program by December 5. The current 6-month oil sales window, running from June 8 to December 5, will be split into a 120-day segment and a 60-day segment instead of two 90-day segments. During each segment Iraq can sell $1.07 billion worth of oil. The resolution should enable Iraq to make up for lost revenues during a delay in the start of oil sales during the first two months of the current six-month sale period. (DJ)
- October 29: Iraq's Revolution Command Council, the country's main decision-making body, announces that it will no longer allow U.S. citizens and U.S. aircraft to serve with the United Nations (U.N.) arms inspection teams. The council's statement gives U.S. citizens working with the inspection teams one week to leave Iraq. Iraq has also asked the U.N. to stop flights by American reconnaissance aircraft monitoring its compliance with U.N. resolutions requiring the elimination of weapons of mass destruction. In response to this statement, the U.N. Security Council unanimously approves a statement condemning Iraq's threats to expel the Americans. (DJ)
- November 20: Iraq's Revolution Command Council formally endorses an agreement, arranged by Russia, that enables United Nations' (U.N.) weapons inspection teams to resume operations in Iraq. The deal ends a three-week standoff between the U.N. and Iraq that began in late October 1997 after Iraq announced it would no longer allow U.S. citizens to serve on U.N. weapons' inspection teams. (DJ)
- November 29: For the first time in four years, OPEC agrees to an increase in its production ceiling. OPEC has raised the ceiling to 27.5 million barrels per day (4,370,000 m^{3}/d) for the first half of 1998, effective January 1, 1998. The new ceiling represents a 10 percent increase over the current ceiling. The new quotas are as follows: Saudi Arabia 8.76 million barrels per day (1,393,000 m^{3}/d) (bbl/d), Iran 3.942 Mbbl/d (626,700 m^{3}/d), Iraq 1.314 Mbbl/d (208,900 m^{3}/d), Venezuela 2.583 Mbbl/d (410,700 m^{3}/d), Nigeria 2.042 Mbbl/d (324,700 m^{3}/d), Indonesia 1.456 Mbbl/d (231,500 m^{3}/d), Kuwait 2.19 Mbbl/d (348,000 m^{3}/d), Libya 1.522 Mbbl/d (242,000 m^{3}/d), United Arab Emirates 2.366 Mbbl/d (376,200 m^{3}/d), Algeria 0.909 Mbbl/d (144,500 m^{3}/d), and Qatar 0.414 Mbbl/d (65,800 m^{3}/d). (NYT)
- December 4: Iraq's United Nations (U.N.) Ambassador Nizar Hamdoon warns that Iraq will not allow oil to flow during a third six-month phase of the U.N.'s oil-for-food sale until the U.N. approves an aid distribution plan. Despite the warning, the U.N. Security Council approves a third six-month phase following the end of the second six-month phase. Like the first two phases, the third phase allows Iraq to sell up to $1.07 billion of oil in each of two 90-day periods. However, the sales level may be increased by the Security Council in January 1998 after U.N. Secretary-General Kofi Annan reports on Iraq's needs. The next day Iraq stops pumping oil into the Iraqi-Turkish pipeline at the end of the second six-month phase of the United Nations (U.N.) oil-for-food program. (WP, NYT)
- December 11: Delegates from 150 industrial nations attending a United Nations climate conference in Kyoto, Japan reach agreement on a protocol to control heat-trapping greenhouse gases. The protocol, if ratified, would commit nations to roll back emissions of six greenhouse gases (carbon dioxide, methane, nitrous oxide, hydrofluorocarbons, perfluorocarbons, and sulphur hexafluoride) below 1990 levels. Under the protocol, the United States would be required to reduce its greenhouse gas emissions by 7 percent below 1990 levels, while Europe and Japan would make cuts of 8 percent and 9 percent, respectively. Developing countries are exempt from the emissions ceilings for the time being. (DJ)

== See also ==
- World oil market chronology from 2003
- 2001 world oil market chronology

== Sources ==
- Energy Information Administration: Chronology of World Oil Market Events
- Commodity Research Bureau. The CRB Commodity Yearbook 1996, Wiley & Sons, Hoboken, 1996.
