= 1996 world oil market chronology =

- January 17: Iraq agrees to talks concerning a United Nations plan to allow for the Iraqi sale of $1 billion of oil for 90 days for a 180-day trial period. Under Resolution 986, proceeds from the sale would be used for humanitarian purposes. In the past, Iraq has opposed clauses 6 and 8b contained in Resolution 986. Clause 6 stipulates that oil exports under this plan must pass through the 1.6 Mbbl/d (250,000 m^{3}/d) Iraq–Turkey pipeline, which currently is unusable because of sludge build-ups and pumping station damage. By most estimates, the line would take a minimum of three months to repair. Clause 8b states that part of the proceeds from the sales would be disbursed under U.N. supervision to Kurdish provinces in northern Iraq. Negotiations between Iraq and the United Nations are scheduled to begin February 6, 1996.
- January 30: Vice Admiral Scott Redd, commander of the United States Fifth Fleet based in the Persian Gulf, states that Iran test-fired a new anti-ship missile near the Strait of Hormuz on January 6. The missile reportedly has a range of 60 miles (100 km) and is viewed as a threat to regional security by United States naval forces operating in the area. Oil tankers carry about 15 Mbbl/d (2,400,000 m^{3}/d) through the Strait.
- February 17: The Sea Empress, a Liberian oil tanker en route to a Texaco oil refinery in Milford Haven, Wales, runs aground in the entrance to Milford Haven Bay. The tanker spills 73,000 tonnes of its 130,824 tonne cargo of light crude oil.
- April 24: In New York City, the United Nations and Iraq end a third round of negotiations over Iraq's possible sale of $1 billion of oil for 90 days for a 180-day trial period. While both sides have reached agreement on most of the key issues, chief Iraqi negotiator Abdul Amir al-Anbari says that the United States and the United Kingdom have fundamentally altered the text of a proposed agreement which he had received from the United Nations early in the third round. Al-Anbari states that the changes have postponed any possible deal. The U.N.-Iraq talks were scheduled to restart on May 10.
- April 30: In the United States, President Bill Clinton approves the sale of $227 million of crude oil from the Strategic Petroleum Reserve. At current oil prices, roughly 12 million barrels (1,900,000 m^{3}) would be sold. The Clinton Administration hopes that the sale will lower gasoline prices in the United States, which are at their highest levels in five years.
- May 20: In New York City, the United Nations and Iraq agree to U.N. Resolution 986. The agreement comes following months of heated negotiations. Iraqi oil exports are expected to begin by the Autumn of 1996, after a pumping station on the Iraq-Turkey pipeline is repaired and U.N monitoring and aid distribution facilities are put in place. Shortly after the agreement, the White House announces its decision to allow U.S. oil companies to purchase Iraqi oil exports.
- June 11: Exxon states that it will soon begin work on its $15-billion Sakhalin I oil and natural gas development in Russia's far East. The Sakhalin I project will develop an estimated 5 billion barrels (790,000,000 m^{3}) of oil and 15 trillion cubic feet (4.2×10^{11} m^{3}) of gas located in three offshore hydrocarbon fields. The $300 million appraisal program will include drilling one exploration well and conducting a 3-D seismic survey. The U.S. company says that it will start working despite ongoing differences with the Russian government over the country's new production sharing law, which is widely viewed as not offering adequate legal protection for foreign investment in the country's oil and gas sectors.
- June 20: The Venezuelan Congress approves eight, multibillion-dollar, profit-sharing deals which allow foreign oil companies to explore and produce oil in Venezuela for the first time since the country's 1975 nationalization of the oil industry. The deals could boost Venezuela's current oil production by 500,000 bbl/d (79,000 m^{3}/d) by 2005. Foreign oil companies such as Amoco and BP were expected to sign final deals with state-owned PdVSA within 10 days and may begin working on their new area by the third quarter of 1996. The eight blocks are estimated to hold between 7 and 11 billion barrels (1.7×10^{9} m^{3}) of light crude oil reserves.
- July 7: OPEC issues a resolution announcing Gabon's withdrawal from the organization, effective January 1, 1997. Gabon had an OPEC quota of 287,000 bbl/d (45,600 m^{3}/d).
- July 18: The United Nations formally approves an Iraqi aid distribution plan, a major step forward in the direction of allowing Iraq to sell oil under Resolution 986.
- August 6: U.S. President Bill Clinton signs a new bill imposing sanctions on non-U.S. companies which invest over $40 million a year in the energy sectors of either Iran or Libya. Under the law, the President would be required to impose at least two of the following sanctions: import and export bans; lending embargoes from U.S. banks; a ban on U.S. procurement of goods and services from sanctioned companies; and a denial of U.S. export financing. The European Union has stated its opposition to the U.S. law and threatened retaliation.
- August 21: In Venezuela, a subsidiary of state-owned Petroleos de Venezuela (PdVSA), Corpoven, signs a memorandum of understanding with U.S. based ARCO. The MOU provides for a $3.5-billion joint venture to develop and upgrade roughly 200,000 bbl/d (32,000 m^{3}/d) of crude oil from the country's 270-billion-barrels (43 km^{3}) Orinoco Heavy Oil Belt. The project will produce 9° American Petroleum Institute (API) gravity crude oil in the Hamaca region and upgrade it to 25° API for export to U.S. refineries. The project will be implemented in three phases, the last of which will be completed in 2006. Another PdVSA subsidiary, Maraven, recently signed another, similar deal with Conoco.
- September 5: Following U.S. cruise missile strikes on military facilities in southern Iraq, crude oil prices rise as the market speculates when Iraq will begin exporting oil under U.N. Resolution 986. Benchmark Brent Blend for October rises above $22/barrel amidst the uncertainty. The U.S. attack follows an Iraqi-supported invasion of Kurdish safe haven areas in the country's northern area. Subsequently, President Bill Clinton states that the U.N. oil-for-food sale should be postponed indefinitely.
- October 30: Exxon confirms that it is in talks with state-owned Qatar General Petroleum Corporation concerning the application of new technology to convert natural gas to petroleum products. Exxon believes that technology developed in a successful 200 bbl/d (32 m^{3}/d) natural gas refinery project in Texas would work in Qatar, where a proposed $1 billion plant would be able produce between 50,000 bbl/d (7,900 m^{3}/d) and 100,000 bbl/d (16,000 m^{3}/d) of middle distillate products. Under the proposal, Qatar's 270×10^{12} cu ft (7,600 km^{3}) North field would supply between 0.5×10^{9} cu ft/d (14,000,000 m^{3}/d) and 1×10^{9} cu ft/d (28,000,000 m^{3}/d) of gas for use as feedstock. In the past, technological barriers and high costs have precluded the development of natural gas refineries.
- December 18: During a press conference, Iranian Deputy Foreign Minister Abbas Maleki states that Iran supports the free flow of oil through the Strait of Hormuz, but reserves the option of closing off the shipping route if it is threatened. Iran recently has admitted to deploying anti-aircraft and anti-ship missiles on Abu Musa, an island strategically located near the Strait of Hormuz's shipping lanes.
- December 30: The United Nations announces that a total of 21 contracts have been approved for the limited Iraqi oil sales under U.N. Resolution 986. The approved contracts will allow for 43.68 million barrels (6,945,000 m^{3}) of oil to be exported in the first 90 days of the sale. At present, exports of 26.37 million barrels (4,192,000 m^{3}) have been approved for the second 90-day period of the sale, which allows Iraq to sell up to $1 billion worth of oil every 90 days for an initial 6-month period. In mid-December 1996, Iraq restarted the Kirkuk–Ceyhan pipeline, which is expected to carry up to 450,000 bbl/d (72,000 m^{3}/d) of oil under the sales agreements approved so far under U.N. Resolution 986. Iraq's remaining oil exports will flow through the Mina al-Bakr terminal. (NYT, DJ)

== Sources ==
- Energy Information Administration: Chronology of World Oil Market Events
- Commodity Research Bureau. The CRB Commodity Yearbook 1996, Wiley & Sons, Hoboken, 1996.

previous year: 1995 world oil market chronology	This article is part of the Chronology of world oil market events (1970-2005)	following year: 1997 world oil market chronology
