= 1999 world oil market chronology =

Sources include: Dow Jones (DJ), New York Times (NYT), Wall Street Journal (WSJ), and the Washington Post (WP).

- January 1: British Petroleum Company and Amoco Corporation complete their $53 billion merger. Chicago-based Amoco is the United States' fifth-largest oil company with roughly 9,300 gasoline stations. London-based British Petroleum, the world's third largest oil company, sells its products through a network of about 17,900 stations. (DJ)
- February 4: Italy's ENI SpA and Russia's RAO Gazprom, the world's largest natural gas producer, agree to build a natural gas pipeline from Russia to Turkey at a cost of nearly $3 billion. Each project partner will hold a 50 percent stake in the project. The proposed pipeline, called the Blue Stream project, is expensive by industry standards partly because it would run at great depth under the waters of the Black Sea. (Asian WSJ)
- February 10: U.S. Energy Secretary Bill Richardson visits Saudi Arabia to discuss potential U.S. investment in the Kingdom's oil and gas sectors. Following his visit, Richardson says the Saudis are primarily interested in foreign investment in the natural gas sector and in the oil refining and marketing sectors, rather than in the upstream crude oil sector. Secretary Richardson's visit comes several months after a September 1998 meeting between several U.S. oil companies, Saudi Crown Prince Abdullah and Saudi Oil Minister Ali Naimi, in which Abdullah requested proposals from the companies on the development of Saudi oil reserves. (DJ, WSJ)
- March 23: In an effort to raise oil prices, which fell sharply in late 1997 and stayed low through 1998 and into early 1999, OPEC and non-OPEC countries agree to cut oil output by a combined 2.104 million barrels per day (334,500 m^{3}/d), effective April 1, 1999, for one year. OPEC members have pledged to cut 1.716 million barrels per day (272,800 m^{3}/d), while several non-OPEC countries have pledged total reductions of 388 million barrels per day (61,700,000 m^{3}/d). During 1998, due mainly to low oil prices, OPEC crude oil export revenues fell 30 percent (to $100 billion) from the previous year. (DJ, NYT)
- March 31: Arco agrees to be acquired by BP Amoco PLC for $26.6 billion in stock. If approved, the merger will create the largest oil producer in the United States and one of the largest energy companies in the world. The deal marks the fourth largest oil company merger since the onset of low oil prices in late 1997. (DJ), (WSJ)
- April 5: Following the arrival in the Netherlands of two Libyan suspects in the 1988 bombing of Pan American Flight 103 that killed 270 people, United Nations sanctions against Libya are suspended. The sanctions, imposed on March 31, 1992, initially included a ban on the sale of equipment for refining and transporting oil, but excluded oil production equipment. Sanctions were then expanded on November 11, 1993, to include a freeze on Libya's overseas assets, excluding revenue from oil, natural gas, or agricultural products. (DJ)
- April 15: The U.S. Department of Energy (DOE) announces that it will begin taking oil deliveries within the next few days under its plan to add 28 million barrels (4,500,000 m^{3}) of oil to the U.S. Government's Strategic Petroleum Reserve (SPR) from federal oil royalty payments. In Phase 1 of the plan, the SPR is expected to acquire about 43 million barrels per day (6,800,000 m^{3}/d) over the next 3 months from oil companies operating in the Gulf of Mexico. Although about 50 percent of the oil supplied in Phase 1 will be imported, domestic producers would still benefit from the entire acquisition since the oil market is international and fungible, according to a DOE official. Under Phase 2 of the program, the DOE expects to acquire about 100 million barrels per day (16,000,000 m^{3}/d) of royalty oil over a 6-month period. (DJ)
- April 17: An oil pipeline that transports oil from Baku, Azerbaijan, to Suspa, Georgia, is officially opened. This is the second pipeline dedicated to exporting Caspian Sea oil, but the first built since the Soviet Union disbanded in 1991. The other Caspian Sea oil pipeline, which runs through the Russian breakaway republic of Chechnya to the Russian port of Novorossisk, is often shut down. The new pipeline to Georgia has a capacity of 100 million barrels per day (16,000,000 m^{3}/d). (DJ)
- April 28: The U.S. Department of Treasury's Office of Foreign Asset Control (OFAC), notifies Mobil that it has turned down Mobil's request for a license to swap crude oil it produces in Turkmenistan in exchange for Iranian oil. Mobil had hoped to be allowed to ship oil produced in Turkmenistan to northern Iranian oil refineries, while Iran, in turn, would provide Iranian oil from Iran's Persian Gulf export terminals to Mobil for shipment to global markets as payment. OFAC is responsible for enforcing U.S. unilateral sanctions against foreign countries. As a result of OFAC's denial of a swap arrangement with Iran, Mobil will have to continue exporting its Turkmenistan oil production across the Caspian Sea by barge to Azerbaijan, where it is then carried by rail or pipeline to Black Sea ports. (DJ, WP)
- May 1: U.S. president Bill Clinton unveils a plan to apply the same standard for tailpipe emissions to cars, light-duty trucks, and most sport utility vehicles (SUVs). Based on current nitrogen oxides (NOx) emission levels, the proposed plan would result in a 77 percent reduction for cars and a 95 percent reduction for light-duty trucks and SUVs. The new standards would be phased in from the 2004 to 2007 model years. At the same time, the Environmental Protection Agency (EPA) proposes a rule that would require refiners to reduce gasoline sulfur content from a current average of nearly 330 parts per million (ppm) to 30 ppm. The new sulfur standard is being proposed in conjunction with the new tailpipe emission proposal since sulfur impedes catalytic converter efficiency, thus making it more difficult to reduce tailpipe emissions without reducing sulfur content in gasoline. Oil industry representatives have vowed to protest the proposed rule, claiming that it will cost refiners $3 billion to $6 billion. The EPA estimates that the cost of compliance for both the automobile and oil industries will be between $3.4 billion and $4.4 billion. (DJ)
- May 10: The Board of Argentine oil company YPF unanimously approved a $13.4 billion offer from Repsol, a Spanish company. Repsol, which already owns 14.99 percent of YPF, made an all-cash offer to purchase the remaining 85.01 percent last month. The Board recommended to all shareholders to accept the Repsol offer. Two Argentine provinces, which own about five percent of YPF's shares, remain concerned about Repsol's intentions for their regions. (WSJ)
- May 12: The Caspian Pipeline Consortium (CPC) begins construction of a 981-mile (1,579 km) pipeline that will carry crude oil from the Caspian Sea to the Russian port of Novorossisk for export to foreign markets. The pipeline's planned capacity is about 1.3 million barrels per day (210,000 m^{3}/d), and the CPC is expecting to load the first tanker in mid-2001. (DJ)
- May 17: The Environmental Protection Agency (EPA) states that it will not change its "Tier Two Plan" to cut gasoline sulfur content and tailpipe emissions, in response to a recent appellate court ruling that the EPA had overstepped its mandate in implementing some provisions of the Clean Air Act. Beginning in 2004, the Tier Two Plan would require refiners to cut gasoline sulfur content to an average of 30 parts per million, down more than 90 percent from the current national average. (DJ)
- May 27: Exxon and Mobil shareholders approve an $81.2 billion merger, in which Exxon will issue 1.32 shares for each share of Mobil's approximately 780.2 million shares outstanding. The merger still must receive regulatory approval from the U.S. government and the European Union. The chairmen of both companies state that they expect regulatory approvals to be obtained by the end of the third quarter of 1999. (DJ)
- June 1: Sudan starts pumping oil through its pipeline linking the Heglig oil field in Western Kordofan province to Port Sudan on the Red Sea. The pipeline has a capacity of 250 million barrels per day (40,000,000 m^{3}/d), and was financed by a consortium of Chinese, Malaysian, Canadian, and Sudanese firms. (DJ)
- August 9: The United States Department of Commerce dismisses a petition filed by Save Domestic Oil, Inc. under anti-dumping statutes. The petition alleged that Saudi Arabia, Venezuela, Mexico, and Iraq had sold crude oil to the United States at artificially low prices. The decision was based on the Department of Commerce's determination that "opposition to the petitions exceeded support." Majority support is defined as petitioner representation of at least 25 percent of the domestic industry and support from at least 50 percent of the industry expressing an opinion. Support from a majority in the affected industry is necessary under the law for Commerce to commence a formal investigation of an anti-dumping complaint. (DJ, WP, NYT)
- September 14: French oil companies Total Fina and Elf Aquitaine agree to merge, after a lengthy takeover battle, in a deal which will form the world's fourth largest oil company. The deal will give Elf Aquitaine shareholders 19 shares of Total Fina for every 13 shares of Elf Aquitaine. According to Total Fina's management, the merger will result in annual cost savings for the combined firm of $1.56 billion. (WP, WSJ)
- September 22: OPEC, at a meeting of its member states' oil ministers, decides to maintain current production cuts until March 2000, despite the fact the crude oil prices have doubled since early 1999. In another development, OPEC announces that its current secretary general, Nigerian Rilwanu Lukman, will stay in office until March 2000. The announcement follows a vigorously contested race to succeed Lukman in the post, in which OPEC's three largest members, Saudi Arabia, Iran, and Iraq, had fielded candidates. (DJ)
- September 28: Iranian Oil Minister Bijan Zanganeh announces that the National Iranian Oil Company has discovered a new oilfield, Azadegan, with 26 billion barrels (4.1×10^{9} m^{3}) of crude oil in Khuzestan province. The discovery is the largest new find in Iran in the last three decades. Zanganeh expects the field to produce between 300,000 and 400 million barrels per day (64,000,000 m^{3}/d) of crude oil three to four years after development begins next year. (DJ)
- September 30: Japan suffers a serious nuclear accident at a uranium processing plant in Tokaimura, in which radiation is released after an apparent uncontrolled nuclear chain reaction. Three workers at the plant, operated by JCO, Inc., are injured. Japanese authorities issue a warning instructing 310,000 people in neighboring communities to stay indoors. (DJ, WSJ)
- October 4: The United Nations Security Council agrees to raise the monetary ceiling on Iraqi oil sales to $8.3 billion from $5.26 billion, guaranteeing the continuation of Iraqi production until the November 20 end date for the current six-month extension of the "oil-for-food" program. The move is a one time adjustment, and does not bind the Security Council to continue a higher ceiling if the program is renewed for another six-month term. The increase reflects the difference between previous monetary ceilings and actual Iraqi sales during previous phases of the program. (DJ)
- November 18: The heads of state of Turkey, Azerbaijan, and Georgia sign an agreement to build the Baku–Tbilisi–Ceyhan pipeline for the export of crude oil from the Caspian Basin. The 1,080-mile (1,740 km) pipeline will begin at the Azerbaijani capital, Baku, and run through Georgia and Turkey to the Turkish port of Ceyhan. The project is expected to cost $2.4 billion, and the government of Turkey has offered guarantees that the cost of the Turkish segment of the pipeline will not exceed $1.4 billion. The signing ceremony took place during a visit to Istanbul by U.S. President Clinton for a summit of the Organization for Cooperation and Security in Europe (OSCE). (WP, NYT)
- November 30: The Federal Trade Commission (FTC) grants approval for the proposed merger between oil giants Exxon and Mobil. The $80 billion merger was approved by the FTC after the firms agreed to the largest divestiture of assets ever involved in a merger. The companies will sell over 2,400 retail outlets, mostly in the Northeast, Texas, and California, and a refinery in California. (DJ)
- December 10: The California Air Resources Board approves a regulatory change that will halve the amount of sulfur allowed in gasoline sold in California from 30 parts per million to 15 parts per million, starting in 2003. The California limit would be half the national limit under a new rule proposed by the Environmental Protection Agency. The current federal sulfur limit for gasoline is 330 parts per million. (WSJ)
- December 21: The Export-Import Bank drops a proposed $500 million loan to Russia's Tyumen Oil after Secretary of State Madeleine Albright exercises her statutory authority to block the transaction. The loan had been controversial in part because of Tyumen Oil's dispute with BP Amoco over the bankruptcy of Russian oil firm Sidanko, in which BP Amoco owns a major stake. BP Amoco and Tyumen Oil later settled the dispute on December 23. (DJ)
- December 31: The Panama Canal Zone reverts to Panamanian sovereignty at noon, after nearly a century of American control. More than a half-million barrels of crude oil and petroleum products transit the Canal each day. (DJ)
- December 31: After nearly two years of construction, ExxonMobil completes the Sable Offshore Energy Project, a $2 billion project to bring natural gas from fields offshore Nova Scotia to the northeastern United States. The fields are estimated to contain 3.5 trillion cubic feet (99 km^{3}) of natural gas. (DJ)
- December 31: Russian President Boris Yeltsin makes a surprise announcement that he is resigning immediately. Vladimir Putin becomes Acting President, and presidential elections will be held within 90 days, with a date to be set by the State Duma. Russia is the largest exporter of energy in the world. (DJ)

== Sources ==
- Energy Information Administration: Chronology of World Oil Market Events
- Commodity Research Bureau. The CRB Commodity Yearbook 1999, 1999.

previous year: 1998 world oil market chronology	This article is part of the Chronology of world oil market events (1970-2005)	following year: 2000 world oil market chronology
