= 1997 world oil market chronology =

- February 5: Japan's Ministry of Finance announces plans to cut import tariffs on crude oil and most petroleum products from April 1, 1997, in a phased process that will reduce the country's crude oil import tariff rate to zero in April 2002. (DJ)
- February 24: Qatar inaugurates the world's largest liquefied natural gas (LNG) exporting facility and formally launches Qatar Liquefied Gas Co., which will have total output capacity of 6 million tons per year of LNG. The facilities are part of a new $7.2 billion industrial zone which also includes a sea port with a capacity to handle 25-30 million tons of LNG annually. Qatar plans to build more gas liquefaction plants in the area to exploit its natural gas reserves of around 237 trillion cubic feet (6,700 km^{3}). (DJ)
- April 1: A Shell spokesman confirms the company will declare force majeure at its Nigerian Bonny terminal due to local protests which disrupted 210 million barrels per day (33,000,000 m^{3}/d) of the company's oil production. Although the protests have ended and production is returning to normal, the backlog is temporarily delaying loadings by three days. (DJ)
- May 16: A final agreement creating the Caspian Pipeline Consortium (CPC) is signed by project participants: Russia (24 percent), Kazakhstan (19 percent), Chevron Corporation (15 percent), AO Lukoil/ARCO Corp. (12.5 percent), Mobil Corp. (7.5 percent), AO Rosneft/Shell Corp. (7.5 percent), Oman (7 percent), Agip SpA (2 percent), British Gas plc (2 percent), Oryx Corp. (1.75 percent), and Kazakhstan Pipeline Ventures, a joint venture of Kazakhstan's state oil company and Amoco Corp. (1.75 percent). The Russian government plans to transfer its stake to two Russian oil companies, AO Lukoil and AO Rosneft. CPC plans to begin building a 932-mile (1,500 km) pipeline to transport crude oil from the Caspian region to Russia's Black Sea coast in 1998 and begin shipping around 558 million barrels per day (88,700,000 m^{3}/d) of oil in 1999 (planned peak capacity is 1.4 million barrels per day (220,000 m^{3}/d)). (DJ)
- May 20: U.S. President Bill Clinton signs an executive order barring new U.S. investment in Burma (also known as Myanmar), effective May 21 and renewable annually. U.S. companies have invested about $250 million in Burma, primarily in the oil and gas sector. The biggest U.S. investor is Unocal, which is building (with France's Total) a $1.2 billion pipeline from Burma's Yadana natural gas field to an electric power plant in Thailand. (DJ)
- June 4: In a unanimous vote, the United Nations Security Council renews for another 180-day period its "oil for food" initiative with Iraq. Under the resolution, Iraq may sell $2 billion worth of oil to buy food, medicine and other necessities to alleviate civilian suffering under the sanctions imposed when it invaded Kuwait in 1990. (WP)
- July 22: The first shipments of oil produced from Kazakhstan's Tengiz field arrive at terminals on the Black Sea in Novorossiysk (Russia) and Batumi (Georgia) for subsequent export through the Bosporus Strait. Volumes total between 100,000 and 150 million barrels per day (24,000,000 m^{3}/d). (DJ)
- July 23: The U.S. State Department rules that Turkey's August 1996 agreement to purchase $23 billion worth of natural gas from Iran over a 20-year period does not violate the Iran and Libya Sanctions Act. In a May 1997 memorandum of understanding with Iran and Turkmenistan, Turkey modified the original arrangement so that the natural gas will be purchased from Turkmenistan rather than Iran. (DJ)
- August 4: In Colombia, Occidental Petroleum, a California-based international oil company, and Ecopetrol, Colombia's national oil company, declare force majeure on all oil exports from the Caño Limón field. The declaration comes after a series of attacks dating back to July 30 knocked out a major oil pipeline transporting oil from the field to the Caribbean port of Coveñas. The pipeline had been attacked 45 times this year which is equal to the total number of attacks for 1996. Responsibility for the attacks has not been determined, but leftist guerrillas from the National Liberation Army are usually blamed for such attacks. The force majeure declaration does not apply to the oil contained in the 2-million-barrels (320,000 m^{3}) storage facility at Coveñas. (DJ)
- August 8: The United Nations approves a sale-price formula for Iraqi crude oil sales under the oil-for-food plan. The approval cleared the way for Iraq to resume limited oil exports immediately through the Turkish port of Ceyhan on the Mediterranean Sea and Iraq's Gulf port of Mina al-Bakr. The United Nations will also begin reviewing contracts for Iraqi crude oil purchases. Iraq has until September 5 to raise the $1.07 billion allowed under the existing 90-day oil-for-food plan window. Iraqi officials state they will boost exports to 2 million barrels per day (320,000 m^{3}/d) to meet the sales target. However, industry experts say that Iraq's export capacity is untested beyond 1.4-million-barrels-per-day (220,000 m^{3}/d). (DJ)
- September 12: The United Nations Security Council passes a resolution that allows Iraq to reach the $2.14 billion oil sales limit under its oil-for-food program by December 5. The current six-month oil sales window, running from June 8 to December 5, will be split into a 120-day segment and a 60-day segment instead of two 90-day segments. During each segment Iraq can sell $1.07 billion worth of oil. The resolution should enable Iraq to make up for lost revenues during a delay in the start of oil sales during the first two months of the current six-month sale period. (DJ)
- October 29: Iraq's Revolution Command Council, the country's main decision-making body, announces that it will no longer allow U.S. citizens and U.S. aircraft to serve with the United Nations (U.N.) arms inspection teams. The council's statement gives U.S. citizens working with the inspection teams one week to leave Iraq. Iraq has also asked the U.N. to stop flights by American reconnaissance aircraft monitoring its compliance with U.N. resolutions requiring the elimination of weapons of mass destruction. In response to this statement, the U.N. Security Council unanimously approves a statement condemning Iraq's threats to expel the Americans. (DJ)
- November 20: Iraq's Revolution Command Council formally endorses an agreement, arranged by Russia, that enables United Nations' (U.N.) weapons inspection teams to resume operations in Iraq. The deal ends a three-week standoff between the U.N. and Iraq that began in late October 1997 after Iraq announced it would no longer allow U.S. citizens to serve on U.N. weapons' inspection teams. (DJ)
- November 29: For the first time in four years, OPEC agrees to an increase in its production ceiling. OPEC has raised the ceiling to 27.5 million barrels per day (4,370,000 m^{3}/d) for the first half of 1998, effective January 1, 1998. The new ceiling represents a 10 percent increase over the current ceiling. (NYT)
- December 4: Iraq's United Nations (U.N.) Ambassador Nizar Hamdoon warns that Iraq will not allow oil to flow during a third six-month phase of the U.N.'s oil-for-food sale until the U.N. approves an aid distribution plan. Despite the warning, the U.N. Security Council approves a third six-month phase following the end of the second six-month phase. Like the first two phases, the third phase allows Iraq to sell up to $1.07 billion of oil in each of two 90-day periods. However, the sales level may be increased by the Security Council in January 1998 after U.N. Secretary-General Kofi Annan reports on Iraq's needs. The next day Iraq stops pumping oil into the Iraqi–Turkish pipeline at the end of the second six-month phase of the United Nations (U.N.) oil-for-food program. (WP, NYT)
- December 11: Delegates from 150 industrial nations attending a United Nations climate conference in Kyoto, Japan, reach agreement on a protocol to control heat-trapping greenhouse gases. The protocol, if ratified, would commit nations to roll back emissions of six greenhouse gases (carbon dioxide, methane, nitrous oxide, hydrofluorocarbons, perfluorocarbons, and sulfur hexafluoride) below 1990 levels. Under the protocol, the United States would be required to reduce its greenhouse gas emissions by 7 percent below 1990 levels, while Europe and Japan would make cuts of 8 percent and 9 percent, respectively. Developing countries, including China and India, are exempt from the emissions ceilings for the time being. (DJ)

== Sources ==
- Energy Information Administration: Chronology of World Oil Market Events
- Commodity Research Bureau. The CRB Commodity Yearbook 1997, 1997.

previous year: 1996 world oil market chronology	This article is part of the Chronology of world oil market events (1970-2005)	following year: 1998 world oil market chronology
