= Matthew Bunn =

American nuclear and energy policy analyst

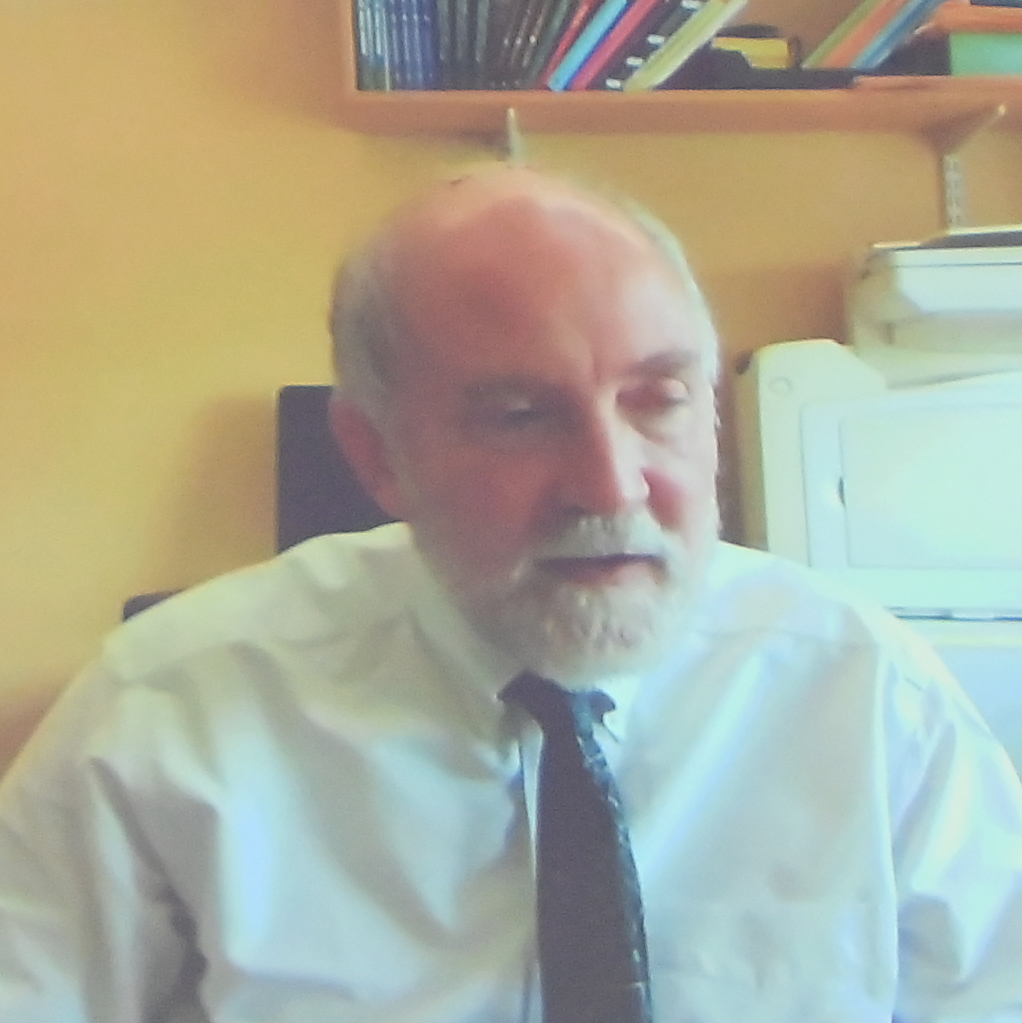
Bunn in 2022

Matthew Bunn (born 1961) is an American nuclear and energy policy analyst, currently a professor of practice at the Harvard Kennedy School at Harvard University. He is the Co-principal Investigator for the Belfer Center's Project on Managing the Atom.

== Professional activities ==
Before coming to Harvard, Bunn served as an adviser to the White House Office of Science and Technology Policy from 1994-1996. Bunn directed the secret 1995 study on nuclear security from the President’s Council of Advisors on Science and Technology (PCAST). This study served as the basis for Presidential Decision Directive 41 (1995) which established U.S. government policies for securing nuclear materials. From 1992-1996, Bunn held a position as a study director at the National Academy of Sciences. During this time, he directed Management and Disposition of Excess Weapons Plutonium and this study became the foundation for U.S. government policy on plutonium disposition. (The creation of what is now the Office of Materials Disposition was announced the day after the report was released.) Bunn initially suggested and helped coordinate the Nuclear Threat Initiative’s $1.2 million gift to the International Atomic Energy Agency's nuclear security programs, which became the founding gift of the Nuclear Security Fund. He developed the concepts of “cold standby” and “warm standby” for Iran’s centrifuges when various forms of “suspension” of Iran’s program were being discussed and co-authored compromise proposals for resolving the dispute over Iran’s program with former Iranian deputy foreign minister Abbas Maleki. Bunn and his colleague Anthony Wier were the first to suggest a four-year effort to secure nuclear material worldwide, a goal that was ultimately agreed to at the 2010 Nuclear Security Summit. Bunn, Wier, and John Holdren, formerly President Obama’s science advisor, first proposed combining U.S. efforts to convert research reactors and remove HEU into a single program, which became the Global Threat Reduction Initiative.

Bunn was also an editor of Arms Control Today from 1990-1992.

== Education ==
Bunn received his Ph.D. in Technology, Management, and Policy from the Massachusetts Institute of Technology in 2007.

== Honors ==
- Bunn is an elected Fellow of the American Association for the Advancement of Science
- He was the 2007 recipient of the American Physical Society's Joseph A. Burton Forum Award for "outstanding contributions in helping to formulate policies to decrease the risks of theft of nuclear weapons and nuclear materials".
- Bunn was also the 2007 recipient of the Hans A. Bethe Award from the Federation of American Scientists for "science in service to a more secure world."

== Selected publications ==
- Matthew Bunn, Martin B. Malin, William C. Potter, and Leonard S. Spector, eds., Preventing Black-Market Trade in Nuclear Technology (Cambridge, U.K.: Cambridge University Press, 2018).
- Matthew Bunn and Scott D. Sagan, eds. Insider Threats. Ithaca, NY: Cornell University Press, January 2017.
- Matthew Bunn, William H. Tobey, Martin B. Malin, and Nickolas Roth. “Preventing Nuclear Terrorism: Continuous Improvement or Dangerous Decline?.” Managing the Atom Project, Belfer Center, March 21, 2016.
- Laura Diaz Anadon, Matthew Bunn, and Venkatesh Narayanamurti, eds. Transforming U.S. Energy Innovation (Cambridge, U.K.: Cambridge University Press, 2014).
- Matthew Bunn and Eben Harrell. Threat Perceptions and Drivers of Change in Nuclear Security Around the World: Results of a Survey (Cambridge, Mass.: Project on Managing the Atom, Belfer Center for Science and International Affairs, Harvard Kennedy School, March 2014).
