= 2000 world oil market chronology =

- January 7: Energy companies and countries around the world report that they have passed into the year 2000 without significant problems from the "Y2K Bug". There was concern that the inability of some computers and embedded control systems to recognize the year 2000 could create serious problems. (DJ, WP)
- January 26: The United Nations Security Council reaches agreement on the appointment of Hans Blix of Sweden, the former head of the International Atomic Energy Agency (IAEA), to lead the new United Nations weapons inspection organization for Iraq. Iraq has indicated that it does not intend to accept the new Security Council resolution. (DJ)
- February 2: The U.S. Federal Trade Commission (FTC) acts to block the proposed merger between BP Amoco and Atlantic Richfield, saying the merger would unduly restrict competition along the West coast of the United States. (WSJ, WP)
- February 9: The Federal Energy Regulatory Commission (FERC) issues a group of policy changes which extend the deregulation of the interstate natural gas pipeline system begun under Order 636 in 1992. Among the changes is a lifting, for a trial period of 30 months, of the price ceiling on secondary market exchanges of short-term gas pipeline capacity. FERC's lifting of the ceiling is meant in part to encourage gas shippers to use longer-term contracts which would promote market stability. (DJ)
- March 6: The United States Supreme Court overturns the State of Washington's law establishing state regulation of oil tankers, ruling unanimously that federal laws take precedence. The attempt to impose tougher regulatory standards came in the wake of the 1989 Exxon Valdez disaster in Alaska. (WP, NYT)
- March 7: New York Mercantile Exchange front-month West Texas Intermediate crude oil futures contract closes at $34.13 per barrel, the highest level in nine years. (WSJ)
- March 15: Phillips Petroleum announces that it has agreed to purchase Atlantic Richfield's assets in Alaska for $6.5 billion. The sale is being made in an effort to secure approval from the Federal Trade Commission (FTC) for the merger of Atlantic Richfield with BP Amoco. Earlier the same day, the FTC announced that it had suspended its antitrust lawsuit seeking to block the merger, citing progress in talks with the companies involved. (DJ, NYT, WSJ)
- March 20: EPA Administrator Carol Browner announces that the Clinton Administration intends to push for a phase out of the use of methyl tertiary butyl ether (MTBE) as a gasoline additive. The administration wants the United States Congress to pass legislation which would end the requirement for the use of MTBE in gasoline sold in some smog-prone urban areas, and instead require nationwide use of ethanol. (DJ)
- March 26: Vladimir Putin is elected president of Russia on the first ballot, winning 53 percent of the popular vote. Putin took office as acting president in December 1999 after the resignation of Boris Yeltsin. (DJ)
- March 28: After two days of meetings, OPEC oil ministers agree on an increase in oil production of 1.452 million barrels per day (230,800 m^{3}/d) by its members, excluding Iran and Iraq. Iraq has not been subject to OPEC production agreements while under U.N. Security Council sanctions. Iran, though not formally signing on to the agreement, stated its intention to raise its production in order to avoid loss of its market share. This would represent about a 1.7-million-barrels-per-day (270,000 m^{3}/d) increase in OPEC production targets, if Iran was included. Several major non-OPEC producers, including Mexico and Norway, also have indicated an intention to raise production. (DJ)
- April 12: Several Chief Executive Officers (CEOs) of major United States oil companies meet with senior Saudi Arabian officials to discuss possible investments in natural gas and petrochemical projects. The firms represented at the meetings include Chevron, Conoco, ExxonMobil, Marathon Oil, Phillips Petroleum, and Texaco. The Saudi government announces, in conjunction with the meetings, a package of legal changes that will make Saudi Arabia more open to foreign investors. Complete foreign ownership will be allowed for some types of projects, and the maximum corporate tax rate for foreign enterprises will be reduced to 15 percent. (WP)
- April 14: BP Amoco receives approval from the Federal Trade Commission (FTC) for its $28 billion takeover of Atlantic Richfield Corporation (ARCO). As part of the approval, ARCO has agreed to sell its crude oil production operations in Alaska to Phillips Petroleum in a deal valued at $6.5 billion. (WP, WSJ) *May 16: Several sources, including the Washington Post, report a major oil find at the Kashagan field offshore from Kazakhstan, with reserves reportedly greater than 8 billion barrels (1.3×10^{9} m^{3}). If these early reserve estimates prove correct, the additional production volumes could boost chances for construction of the proposed Baku–Tbilisi–Ceyhan pipeline. (WP, DJ)
- May 17: The Environmental Protection Agency (EPA) formally proposes a rule which, if finalized, would reduce allowable sulfur levels in diesel fuel by 97 percent over the next five years. The move is opposed by major refiners. (DJ)
- May 17: The Energy Information Administration releases a study of oil reserves in the Arctic National Wildlife Refuge (ANWR), which currently is off-limits to oil exploration. The study estimates that there are between 5.7 and 16 billion barrels (2.5×10^{9} m^{3}) of recoverable oil in the ANWR. (WSJ) *June 6: The World Bank executive board votes to approve a loan of $193 million to support a project to build a crude oil pipeline from Chad to the coast of Cameroon. The countries will collect an estimated $2 billion in revenues from the project over a period of 25 years. (DJ)
- June 8: The Brazilian government conducts an auction of oil exploration and production concessions covering a total of 21 blocks, both onshore and offshore. The auction represents an important step in the opening of Brazil's oil industry to international competition and investment. (NYT)
- June 9: The United States and Mexico sign a treaty resolving the issue of economic rights over the deepwater "doughnut hole" area in the Gulf of Mexico between the two countries. The agreement is based on measuring distances from each country's coast, and gives the United States rights to 38 percent of the area. (DJ)
- June 15: The German government announces an agreement with utilities for the complete phaseout of nuclear power. Nuclear power plants will be closed after a lifespan of 32 years. Nuclear power supplies about one-third of Germany's electricity, and the phaseout plan may complicate Germany's plans to reduce fossil fuel consumption to curb greenhouse gas emissions. (DJ)
- June 19: The Energy Information Administration reports a one-week rise of five cents in the average price of regular gasoline, to $1.681. This is the seventh straight week of increasing prices. Gasoline prices in the Midwest are the nation's highest, at $1.874. (DJ)
- June 21: OPEC oil ministers, meeting in Vienna, agree to raise crude oil production quotas by a total of 708,000 barrels per day (112,600 m^{3}/d). OPEC's total production quota (excluding Iraq) will rise to 25.4 million barrels per day (4,040,000 m^{3}/d) as of July 1, 2000. The next day, crude oil futures rise, with the New York Mercantile Exchange (NYMEX) August West Texas Intermediate contract closing June 22 at $32.19. (DJ)
- July 12: The Kuwaiti parliament ratifies a treaty with Saudi Arabia resolving competing claims to offshore mineral rights. The two countries will share revenues from the Khafji, Dorra, and Hout oil and gas fields. The treaty will allow the two governments to begin negotiations with Iran to settle conflicting claims, which have again surfaced as Iran has begun drilling in the Dorra offshore gas field. (DJ)
- July 27: Italy's ENI signs a deal with Iran worth $3.8 billion for the development of the country's South Pars gas field in the Persian Gulf. The project will take five years to become operational, and will eventually produce 530 million cubic feet (15,000,000 m^{3}) of gas per day. (DJ)
- July 30: Venezuelan President Hugo Chávez wins reelection with 60% of the popular vote. His Patriotic Pole party also wins a controlling majority in the country's new unicameral legislature. (DJ)
- August 10: Venezuelan President Hugo Chávez meets with Iraqi President Saddam Hussein in Baghdad as part of a tour of OPEC member states. Chavez is the first head of state to visit Saddam Hussein since the 1990 Iraqi invasion of Kuwait. (NYT, WP)
- August 23: The Energy Information Administration reports that crude oil stock levels in the United States have fallen to their lowest level since 1976. Crude oil for October delivery closes at $32.02 on the New York Mercantile Exchange (NYMEX), up 80 cents. (DJ)
- August 30: The Department of Energy awards contracts to create a two-million-barrel reserve of heating oil. The oil will be stored in privately owned facilities in Woodbridge, New Jersey, and New Haven, Connecticut. (DJ)
- September 8: Truck drivers in Britain begin a blockade of oil refineries to protest high fuel prices. The blockade follows a similar protest in France. (DJ)
- September 10: At a meeting in Vienna, OPEC agrees to raise production quotas by 800,000 barrels per day (130,000 m^{3}/d) (to 26.2 million barrels per day (4,170,000 m^{3}/d), not counting Iraq) in an attempt to push crude oil prices back under $28 per barrel. The quota increases become effective October 1. (DJ)
- September 20: Oil prices close at $37.20 on the New York Mercantile Exchange (NYMEX), after trading as high as $37.80 during the day's trading session. The price spike comes amid an increase in tensions between Iraq and Kuwait. This level sets a new ten-year high for NYMEX crude oil. (DJ)
- September 22: U.S. President Bill Clinton authorizes the release of 30 million barrels (4,800,000 m^{3}) of oil from the Strategic Petroleum Reserve (SPR) over 30 days to bolster oil supplies, particularly heating oil in the Northeast. The release will take the form of a "swap," in which crude oil volumes drawn from the SPR will be replaced by the recipients at a later date. Crude oil for November delivery falls four percent, to $32.68, on the New York Mercantile Exchange (NYMEX). (DJ)
- September 26: A summit of OPEC heads of government opens in Caracas, Venezuela. The summit is only the second OPEC meeting held at that level. The summit ends on a conciliatory note, with the communique calling for increased dialogue between OPEC and consuming nations. (DJ)
- September 28: The United Nations Compensation Commission, which handles claims for reparations arising from Iraq's 1990 invasion of Kuwait, approves by consensus a $15.9 billion claim by Kuwait for compensation for lost oil production and damage to oil reserves and equipment. The proportion of revenues from Iraqi oil sales under the "oil for food" program which are used for payment of claims is reduced from 30 percent to 25 percent. Iraq condemns the decision, but states that it will not call a halt to oil exports, as had earlier been feared. (DJ)
- October 12: Oil prices rise sharply on news of a terrorist attack on an American warship, the USS Cole, in the Yemeni port of Aden, as well as escalating violence between Palestinians and Israeli security forces. November crude oil on the New York Mercantile Exchange (NYMEX) rises $2.81 to close at $36.06 per barrel. Prices for Henry Hub natural gas hit a record high of $5.78 per million British thermal units (BTU) before falling back slightly to close at $5.63 per million BTU. (WSJ)
- October 15: Chevron agrees to purchase Texaco for $35.1 billion in stock. The deal would create the fourth largest oil and gas company in the world, and follows a general trend toward consolidation among the major oil companies over the last two years. Analysts expect the merger, like other recent mergers, to face intensive antitrust scrutiny, especially as a combined ChevronTexaco would have a heavy share of both refining capacity and retail outlets on the west coast of the United States. (WSJ)
- October 30: The president OPEC, Venezuelan oil minister Ali Rodriguez, announces that the cartel will raise production quotas by 500,000 barrels per day (79,000 m^{3}/d), beginning November 1. OPEC's action comes as a result of its "price band" mechanism, which triggers an increase in production quotas when the price of the OPEC Basket of crude oils closes over $28 per barrel for twenty consecutive trading days. Many analysts voice doubt as to whether the OPEC quota increase will lead to an actual increase in production of that magnitude, given the lack of spare production capacity of most OPEC members. (DJ, WP, WSJ)
- October 31: The United Nations Sanctions Committee approves an Iraqi request to be paid in euros, rather than United States dollars, for oil exported under the "oil for food" program, which is part of the sanctions regime stemming from Iraq's 1990 invasion of Kuwait. (DJ)
- November 3: Russia's Lukoil announces that it will purchase Getty Petroleum Marketing of the United States for $71 million. Lukoil eventually intends to switch Getty's 1,300 retail outlets in the Northeastern and Middle Atlantic states to the Lukoil brand name. The purchase represents the first takeover of a publicly traded American company by a Russian firm. (DJ)
- November 12: OPEC oil ministers, meeting in Vienna, announce a decision to put any further production increases on hold until their next meeting scheduled for January 17, 2001. The move effectively ends OPEC's "price band" mechanism, which called for automatic increases in production quotas of 500,000 barrels per day (79,000 m^{3}/d) when the price of the OPEC Basket of crude oils remained over $28 per barrel for 20 consecutive trading days. OPEC also selects the Venezuelan oil minister, Ali Rodriguez, as its new Secretary General. He will formally take over from Nigeria's Rilwanu Lukman on January 1, 2001. (NYT, WSJ)
- November 16: Iraq's State Oil Marketing Organization (SOMO) demands that companies lifting cargoes of Iraqi crude oil begin paying a fifty cent per barrel surcharge starting on December 1, 2000. The surcharge would be paid directly to the Iraqi government rather than being channeled into the account administered by the United Nations under the "oil for food" program, and would constitute clear violation of sanctions. The Iraqi move leads to concerns over a possible Iraqi cutoff of oil supplies beginning December 1. (DJ)
- November 26: The sixth Conference of Parties (COP-6) of the Kyoto Protocol in The Hague ends without an agreement between member states on implementing cuts in emissions of greenhouse gases. One of the main issues under negotiation at the conference was the possibility that member states could claim credit for "carbon sinks," forests, and farmland which absorb carbon dioxide, as part of their overall commitment to reducing carbon dioxide emissions. Another main issue was "emissions trading," which would allow member states to purchase "emissions credits" from other member states whose carbon dioxide emissions were below their targets. (WP, WSJ, NYT)
- December 1: Vicente Fox is inaugurated as Mexico's president. Ernesto Martens takes office as the new Minister of Petroleum. (DJ)
- December 4: California utilities are forced to cut off electricity supplies to some "interruptible" customers due to a supply shortage. California has suffered shortages and high wholesale electricity prices since May 2000. The immediate shortage stems, in part, from a reduction in electricity imports from the Pacific Northwest as a result of cold weather in the area. Other problems include: gas supply problems, low availability of hydroelectric and nuclear generating capacity, and high power demand. (DJ)
- December 5: The United Nations Security Council approves a six-month extension to the Iraq "oil for food" program. (DJ)
- December 16: Ukraine permanently shuts down the last reactor at its Chernobyl nuclear power plant, which gained notoriety for a major accident and radioactivity release in 1986. The facility will still be the location of a major cleanup effort, as Ukraine tries to contain continuing leakage from the containment structures around the reactors damaged in the accident. (DJ)
- December 21: The Environmental Protection Agency (EPA) announces new regulations which will drastically reduce the allowable sulfur content in diesel fuel in the United States. The new diesel sulfur standard will be 15 parts per million (PPM). Oil industry trade groups have opposed the new standard. (DJ)
- December 27: Natural gas prices in the United States surge above $10 per million British Thermal Units (BTUs) for the first time ever in response to cold weather and stock draws reported by the American Gas Association (AGA). Henry Hub natural gas closes at $9.978, after falling slightly from its intraday peak price. (DJ)
- December 27: Venezuelan President Hugo Chávez appoints Alvaro Silva Calderon to replace Ali Rodriguez as Minister of Petroleum. Calderon had previously served as a deputy minister. Rodriguez had recently been chosen as the new OPEC Secretary General. Both will assume their new posts effective January 5, 2001. (DJ)
- December 31: Saudi oil minister Ali Naimi says that OPEC will cut production when ministers meet in Vienna on January 17, 2001. Oil prices have fallen sharply in recent weeks, with the OPEC basket reaching $21.50 per barrel on December 25, down one-third from highs reached in October 2000. Despite the recent decline, average oil prices for 2000 were the highest (not adjusted for inflation) in seventeen years. (DJ)

== Sources ==
- Energy Information Administration: Chronology of World Oil Market Events
- Commodity Research Bureau. The CRB Commodity Yearbook 2000, 2000.

Other sources include: Dow Jones (DJ), New York Times (NYT), Wall Street Journal (WSJ), and the Washington Post (WP).

Previous year: 1999 world oil market chronology	This article is part of the Chronology of world oil market events (1970-2005)	Following year: 2001 world oil market chronology
