= 1990–1999 world oil market chronology =

== 1990 ==
- Aug: Iraq invades Kuwait. Crude and product prices soar upward; exchange markets react wildly to any Middle East news events; cash markets dominate prices after trading hours; jet fuel prices rise to record spreads over other products due to increase in defense demand. In late August, OPEC president fails to revive floundering attempts to organize a formal OPEC meeting to discuss crisis/production strategies. Informal meetings held in Vienna result in record price falls. Conflicting reports of promises to increase OPEC output to compensate for embargo of Iraq and Kuwait oil further compound market uncertainties.
- 2 August: Iraq invades Kuwait. Bush orders troops to Saudi Arabia.
- 27 August: Market prices plunge as OPEC nears informal agreement to increase output to cover 4 Mbbl/d (640,000 m^{3}/d) shortfall due to invasion. Cash market trading experiences abrupt decline.
- September 6: U.S. citizen is shot in Kuwait. API reports 4.4 Mbbl (700,000 m^{3}) weekly draw in domestic crude stocks. Oil markets surge on aggressive U.S. statements toward Iraq.
- September 18: Crude prices outpace increases in product prices and there is talk of cutting refinery runs.
- September 20: Poor refining margins.
- September 21: Reports that U.S. refinery problems will lead to a 200,000 bbl/d (32,000 m^{3}/d) loss in capacity and aggressive remarks by Saddam Hussein send crude prices to new highs.
- September 24: Iraq invades the French and Dutch missions in Kuwait. French president Mitterrand called the action a violation of international law. A United States Navy warship boards an Iraqi-flagged tanker bound for the port of Basrah. Saddam Hussein states his willingness to strike first and his intention to damage oil fields in the region if Iraq does strike.
- October 1: Saddam Hussein says he may be willing to negotiate the occupation of Kuwait and would consider foreign participation in negotiations.
- October 3: API reports a 9 Mbbl (1,400,000 m^{3}) weekly U.S. crude inventory draw.
- October 8: Fear of war and long-term supply disruptions as Hussein threatens Israel.
- October 10: API reports crude inventories dropped by more than 4 Mbbl (640,000 m^{3}) in the last week.
- October 11: Libya's Qadhafi says Israel must be eliminated, and U.K. Foreign Secretary Douglas Hurd says force would be used if Iraq doesn't withdrawal from Kuwait.
- November 5: Reports of increasing Saudi production and lower world demand.
- November 6: Iran's oil-producing region suffers a serious earthquake.
- November 7: API reports 5 Mbbl (790,000 m^{3}) U.S. crude inventory weekly increase.
- November 8: Unconfirmed rumors that Bush would announce an airlift of supplies to U.S. embassy in Kuwait, which could ultimately trigger a military clash.
- November 13: Saudis ask U.S. for rights to bid on SPR crude.
- November 19: Report that Iraq will bolster its forces in Kuwait. Soviet Union shows reluctance to endorse the use of force against Iraq.
- November 20: API reports crude inventory drop in U.S. of more than 4 Mbbl (640,000 m^{3}). Saddam Hussein announces plans to release German hostages.
- November 21: French president Mitterrand voices support of a proposed U.N. resolution that would authorize the use of force in the Persian Gulf.
- November 26: U.S. proposes addition to U.N. resolution that would require Iraq's withdrawal from Kuwait by January 1.
- November 29: U.N. Security Council approves U.S.-sponsored resolution authorizing the use of force in the Persian Gulf if Iraq does not withdrawal from Kuwait by January 15, 1991.
- November 30: President Bush offers to send Secretary of State James Baker to Baghdad to meet with Hussein.
- December 4: An Iraqi official reports that Iraq will withdraw if it can retain control of the Rumaila Field and keep Bubiyan and Warbah islands; also says that demands that the Palestinian issue be treated separately would not be surmountable.
- December 5: Iraq announces willingness to speak with U.S. about resolving the Persian Gulf crisis.
- December 13: Secretary of State Baker questions Iraq's seriousness about Middle East peace.
- December 18: Bush reiterates his "no concessions" stance against Iraq.

== 1991 ==
- January 4: Reports Iraq will accept U.S. offer for talks in Geneva.
- January 7: Saddam Hussein prepares his troops for what he says will be a long violent war against the U.S.
- January 9-January 14: At Geneva talks, Baker says that "regrettably" Iraqi Foreign Minister Aziz has indicated no softening in Iraq's position. Peace talks break down, but there is still talk of a peaceful solution to the crisis.
- January 15: Report that Iraq has a new peace initiative.
- January 16: U.S. begins air attack against Iraqi military targets. President Bush directs drawdown of Strategic Petroleum Reserve (SPR). U.S. Secretary of Energy James Watkins orders 33.75 Mbbl (5,366,000 m^{3}) drawdown. Crude oil prices drop $9–10 per barrel in one day after having risen $3–5 per barrel during the first half of January.
- January 17: Reports of early U.S. and allied success against Iraqi forces. DOE issues SPR sales notice.
- January 18: Iraqi Scud missiles land in Israel.
- January 22: Some Kuwaiti oil facilities are destroyed by Iraq and more Iraqi missile attacks on Saudi Arabia.
- January 30: United States Department of Energy selects 13 firms to purchase 17.3 Mbbl (2,750,000 m^{3}) of SPR crude oil.
- February: Surplus of unsold oil held by oil producers reaches 80 Mbbl (13,000,000 m^{3}) to 90 Mbbl (14,000,000 m^{3}).
- February 5: First SPR oil delivered to commercial buyers.
- February 15: Daily market volatility as Hussein mentions withdrawal, but U.S. president George H. W. Bush calls his offer a "cruel hoax."
- February 26: Signs of Iran crude now an option for U.S. refiners, but no imports from Iran likely in near future.
- February 28: War ends. United Nations troops move into Kuwait City. Saddam Hussein orders troops out of Kuwait. Iraqi soldiers ignite Kuwaiti oil fields during their retreat.
- March 1: News that Kuwait will need to import crude in the short term.
- March 12: OPEC announces production cut to 22.3 Mbbl/d (3,550,000 m^{3}/d).
- March 13: API reports a 6 Mbbl (950,000 m^{3}) weekly domestic crude inventory draw; Saudi Arabia and Iran say OPEC production cuts will take effect April 1.
- March 19: Gorbachev says the Soviet Union will cut its oil exports by nearly half.
- March 25: Nigerian crude becomes competitive in U.S. Gulf Coast as Nigeria cuts crude prices.
- April 25: Iraq expects to resume crude and product exports by July.
- June 3: Kuwait asks GCC members to produce 800,000 bbl/d (130,000 m^{3}/d) of oil on its behalf.
- Aug: Unsuccessful coup attempt against Soviet president Gorbachev has minimal effect on oil markets.
- Oct: Soviet Union suspends petroleum product exports as its fuel shortages grow. NYMEX futures price for WTI climbs nearly $2, ending at $24 per barrel.
- November: Last of Kuwait oil well fires extinguished by well control teams.
- November: U.S. Senate filibuster causes withdrawal of an Arctic National Wildlife Refuge (ANWR) pro-leasing bill.
- December: Soviet Union collapses as a series of events precipitated by Ukrainian vote for independence leads to formation of Commonwealth of Independent States (CIS).

== 1992 ==
- January: Kuwait reports oil production of 400,000 bbl/d (64,000 m^{3}/d); insists on restoration of its pre-invasion OPEC quota of 1.5 Mbbl/d (240,000 m^{3}/d).
- March: UN threatens sanctions against Libya for its refusal to extradite suspected terrorists.
- March: CIS announces that 1991 crude exports dropped by 52%.
- May: Saudi Arabia supports a crude oil price hike during a late-month OPEC meeting. NYMEX Futures prices exceed $22 per barrel.
- Oct: OPEC production reaches highest level in more than a decade at 25.25 Mbbl/d (4,014,000 m^{3}/d).
- December: U.S., Mexico, and Canada sign the North American Free Trade Agreement, a multi-lateral free trade agreement.

== 1993 ==
- July: Oil prices plunge on speculation that Iraq will accept U.N. missile test site inspections and receive approval to resume oil exports.
- November: Combination of OPEC overproduction, surging North Sea output, and weak demand lowers the price of Brent to near $15 per barrel.

== 1994 ==
- April: Oil Prices firm on strength of institutional shifting of U.S. investment funds from equity and bond markets to cash and commodities.
- Apr-September: Nigerian production disrupted by oil workers' strike in response to imprisonment of apparent winner of presidential elections.

== 1995 ==
- January 14: Mexico pledges profits from state-owned Pemex's $7-billion-per-year oil revenues in an effort to secure U.S. congressional approval of $40-billion worth of loan guarantees. Subsequently, President Clinton approved a $20-billion U.S. aid package for Mexico. (DMN)
- January 30: Norway's Statoil announces that a newly formed consortium of 11 oil companies will develop a plan to supply Norwegian natural gas to the European continent. Three Norwegian companies recently signed a contract with Gaz de France to bring 1.4 trillion cubic feet (40 km^{3}) of Norwegian gas to France between 2001 and 2027. (DJ)
- February 28: The Pentagon announces that it monitored Iranian installation of surface-to-air Hawk missiles in the Strait of Hormuz. The Iranians also have taken possession of and fortified the nearby Abu Musa and the Tunb Islands, which are claimed by both Iran and the United Arab Emirates (UAE). (DJ)
- June 14: After OPEC's semi-annual meeting in Vienna, President Ida Bagus Sudjana discloses the Organization's intention to roll over its present crude oil production ceiling of 24.52 million barrels per day (3,898,000 m^{3}/d). The announcement is followed by a trip to Norway by Saudi Arabian Oil Minister Hisham M. Nazer. Upon arriving, the Saudi Minister asks Norwegian Minister of Industry and Energy Jens Stoltenberg to restrain his country's oil production in the hopes of stabilizing world oil prices. (FT, DJ)
- June 30: Exxon signs a $15.2-billion deal to develop oil and gas fields near Russia's Sakhalin Island. The Sakhalin I project will develop the offshore Shayvo, Odoptu, and Arkutun-Dagi fields that together are estimated to contain 2.5 billion barrels (400,000,000 m^{3}) of crude oil and 15 trillion cubic feet (420 km^{3}) of natural gas. Exxon has a 30 percent stake in the project. (NYT, DJ)
- July 6: Venezuela's Congress approves the country's first investment law allowing for foreign participation in oil exploration and production. The newly passed "model agreement" authorizes the state-owned oil company Petroleos de Venezuela S.A. (PDVSA) to offer 10 exploration blocks to foreign investors. If oil is discovered, the government will maintain a majority stake in any joint venture formed to develop the new fields. (FT, DJ)
- July 27: Saudi Aramco awards the giant Shaybah oil field development project to U.S.-based Parsons Corporation. The $2.5-billion project will develop the 7-billion-barrels (1.1 km^{3}) field, including the construction of crude oil production facilities, gas-oil separation plants, and a 372 mile (599 km) pipeline. The Shaybah field is located on the Saudi-UAE border and is expected to produce 500 million barrels per day (79,000,000 m^{3}/d) after it comes on line in 1999. (PON)
- July 28: Norwegian Finance Minister Sigbjorn Johnsen says that Norway should not lower its crude oil production in an attempt to boost world oil prices. Norwegian Oil Minister Jens Stoltenberg believes production cuts may be necessary if prices begin to fall. Minister Johnsen's remarks follow last month's visit by Saudi Arabian Oil Minister Hisham M. Nazer, who asked Minister Stoltenberg to cut Norway's crude oil production. (PON)
- 2 August: Saudi Arabia's King Fahd issues a decree replacing all members of the Council of Ministers who do not have blood ties so the royal Family. While most of the council's top positions are unaffected by the reshuffling, Oil Minister Hisham Nazer is replaced with Ali bin Ibrahim al-Naimi. (WSJ)
- 14 August: Iran's official news agency, IRNA, reports that Iran has been unable to sell 200 million barrels per day (32,000,000 m^{3}/d) of crude oil since the imposition of a unilateral oil embargo by the U.S. Iran increasingly has sold its crude oil on spot markets as opposed to long-term contracts. Larger purchases by France, Spain, Italy, China, India, Pakistan, and Thailand have failed to offset decreased demand by German and Japanese refiners. Before the U.S. embargo was announced in April 1995, U.S. companies were buying between 400,000 and 450 million barrels per day (72,000,000 m^{3}/d), down from roughly 600 million barrels per day (95,000,000 m^{3}/d) in 1994. (PON)
- 28 August: Kuwaiti Oil Minister Abdul Mohsen al-Medej announces that his country will increase its oil production capacity to as much as 3.5 million barrels per day (560,000 m^{3}/d) by 2005. (DJ)
- 13 September: The Kuwaiti Oil Ministry states its intention to seek a 200-million-barrels-per-day (32,000,000 m^{3}/d) increase to its current 2-million-barrels-per-day (320,000 m^{3}/d) crude oil production quota at the November 1995 OPEC meeting in Vienna. The announcement comes amidst growing non-OPEC oil production and weak oil prices. (DJ)
- 22 November: OPEC states that it will roll over its current oil production quota of 25.42 million barrels per day (4,041,000 m^{3}/d). The roll-over was widely anticipated because of slack world oil demand, rising non-OPEC production, and weak prices. (DJ, PON)
- 29 November: U.S. president Bill Clinton approves legislation lifting a 22-year-old ban on exports of oil from the Alaskan North Slope (ANS). The ban was imposed after the oil embargo by Arab oil producers in 1973. The lifting of the ban opens up about one-quarter of U.S. crude oil production for export. The ANS legislation also waives royalty payments on deep water oil and gas leases in the Gulf of Mexico. (WP)
- 12 December: Speaking in New York during a U.S. visit by Angolan President Eduardo dos Santos, Joaquim David, president of the state-owned oil company Sonangol, states that Angola will increase its crude oil production by 10 percent per year over the next five years, reaching 720 million barrels per day (114,000,000 m^{3}/d) by the end of 1996 and 1 million barrels (160,000 m^{3}) per day by 2001. The statement comes amidst sporadic violence involving government forces and the rebel group UNITA, less than a year after a peace accord was signed ending the country's 20-year-old civil war. At the end of 1995, Angola had raised its crude oil production to 690 million barrels per day (110,000,000 m^{3}/d). (PON, DJ)

== 1996 ==
Sources include: Dow Jones (DJ), Financial Times (FT), New York Times (NYT), and Platt's Oilgram News (PON), Washington Post (WP), and the Wall Street Journal (WSJ).

- January 17: Iraq agrees to talks concerning a U.N. plan to allow for the Iraqi sale of $1 billion of oil for 90 days for a 180-day trial period. Under U.N. Resolution 986, proceeds from the sale would be used for humanitarian purposes. In the past, Iraq has opposed clauses 6 and 8b contained in Resolution 986. Clause 6 stipulates that oil exports under this plan must pass through the 1.6 Mbbl/d (250,000 m^{3}/d) Iraq-Turkey pipeline, which currently is unusable because of sludge build-ups and pumping station damage. By most estimates, the line would take a minimum of three months to repair. Clause 8b states that part of the proceeds from the sales would be disbursed under U.N. supervision to Kurdish provinces in northern Iraq. Negotiations between Iraq and the United Nations are scheduled to begin February 6, 1996. (FT, PON, DJ)
- January 30: Vice Admiral Scott Redd, commander of the U.S. Fifth Fleet based in the Persian Gulf, states that Iran test-fired a new anti-ship missile near the Strait of Hormuz on January 6. The missile reportedly has a range of 60 miles (100 km) and is viewed as a threat to regional security by U.S. naval forces operating in the area. Oil tankers carry about 15 Mbbl/d (2,400,000 m^{3}/d) through the Strait. (DJ)
- April 24: In New York, the United Nations and Iraq end a third round of negotiations over Iraq's possible sale of $1 billion of oil for 90 days for a 180-day trial period. Under U.N. Resolution 986, proceeds from the sale would be used for humanitarian purposes. While both sides have reached agreement on most of the key issues, chief Iraqi negotiator Abdul Amir al-Anbari says that the United States and the United Kingdom have fundamentally altered the text of a proposed agreement which he had received from the United Nations early in the third round. Al-Anbari states that the changes have postponed any possible deal. The U.N.-Iraq talks are scheduled to restart on May 10. (DJ)
- April 30: In the United States, President Clinton approves the sale of $227 million of crude oil from the Strategic Petroleum Reserve. At current oil prices, roughly 12 million barrels (1,900,000 m^{3}) would be sold. The Clinton Administration hopes that the sale will lower gasoline prices in the United States, which are at their highest levels in five years. (WSJ)
- May 20: In New York, the United Nations and Iraq agree to U.N. Resolution 986, which provides Iraq with the opportunity to sell $1 billion of oil for 90 days for a 180-day trial period. Under the resolution, proceeds from the sale would be used for humanitarian purposes. The agreement comes following months of heated negotiations. Iraqi oil exports are expected to begin by the Fall of 1996, after a pumping station on the Iraq–Turkey pipeline is repaired and U.N monitoring and aid distribution facilities are put in place. Shortly after the agreement, the White House announces its decision to allow U.S. oil companies to purchase Iraqi oil exports. (FT, PON, WSJ)
- June 11: Exxon states that it will soon begin work on its $15-billion Sakhalin I oil and natural gas development in Russia's Far East. The Sakhalin I project will develop an estimated 5 billion barrels (790,000,000 m^{3}) of oil and 15 trillion cubic feet (4.2×10^{11} m^{3}) of gas located in three offshore hydrocarbon fields. The $300 million appraisal program will include drilling one exploration well and conducting a 3-D seismic survey. The U.S. company says that it will start working despite ongoing differences with the Russian government over the country's new production sharing law, which is widely viewed as not offering adequate legal protection for foreign investment in the country's oil and gas sectors. (FT)
- June 20: The Venezuelan Congress approves eight, multibillion-dollar, profit-sharing deals which allow foreign oil companies to explore and produce oil in Venezuela for the first time since the country's 1975 nationalization of the oil industry. The deals could boost Venezuela's current oil production by 500,000 bbl/d (79,000 m^{3}/d) by 2005. Foreign oil companies such as Amoco and BP are expected to sign final deals with state-owned PdVSA within 10 days and may begin working on their new land by the third quarter of 1996. The eight blocks are estimated to hold between 7 and 11 billion barrels (1.7×10^{9} m^{3}) of light crude oil reserves. (PON, DJ)
- July 7: OPEC issues a resolution announcing Gabon's withdrawal from the organization, effective January 1, 1995. Gabon had an OPEC quota of 287,000 bbl/d (45,600 m^{3}/d). (FT)
- July 18: The United Nations formally approves an Iraqi aid distribution plan, a major step forward in the direction of allowing Iraq to sell oil under Resolution 986. (DJ)
- August 6: President Clinton signs a new bill imposing sanctions on non-U.S. companies which invest over $40 million a year in the energy sectors of either Iran or Libya. Under the law, the President would be required to impose at least two of the following sanctions: import and export bans; lending embargoes from U.S. banks; a ban on U.S. procurement of goods and services from sanctioned companies; and a denial of U.S. export financing. The European Union has stated its opposition to the U.S. law and threatened retaliation. (FT)
- August 21: In Venezuela, a subsidiary of state-owned Petroleos de Venezuela (PdVSA), Corpoven, signs a memorandum of understanding (MOU) with U.S.-based ARCO. The MOU provides for a $3.5-billion joint venture to develop and upgrade roughly 200,000 bbl/d (32,000 m^{3}/d) of crude oil from the country's 270-billion Orinoco Heavy Oil Belt. The project will produce 9° API gravity crude oil in the Hamaca region and upgrade it to 25° API for export to U.S. refineries. The project will be implemented in three phases, the last of which will be completed in 2006. Another PdVSA subsidiary, Maraven, recently signed another, similar deal with Conoco. (PON, FT)
- September 5: Following U.S. cruise missile strikes on military facilities in southern Iraq, crude oil prices rise as the market speculates when Iraq will begin exporting oil under U.N. Resolution 986. Benchmark Brent Blend for October rises above $22/barrel amidst the uncertainty. The U.S. attack follows an Iraqi-supported invasion of Kurdish safe haven areas in the country's northern area. Subsequently, President Bill Clinton states that the U.N. oil-for-food sale should be postponed indefinitely. (DJ)
- October 30: Exxon confirms that it is in talks with state-owned Qatar General Petroleum Corporation concerning the application of new technology to convert natural gas to petroleum products. Exxon believes that technology developed in a successful 200 bbl/d (32 m^{3}/d) Anatural gas refinery project in Texas would work in Qatar, where a proposed $1-billion plant would be able produce between 50,000 bbl/d (7,900 m^{3}/d) to 100,000 bbl/d (16,000 m^{3}/d) of middle distillate products. Under the proposal, Qatar's 270×10^{12} cu ft (7,600 km^{3}) North field would supply between 0.5×10^{9} cu ft (14,000,000 m^{3}) and 1×10^{9} cu ft (28,000,000 m^{3}) per day of gas for use as feedstock. In the past, technological barriers and high costs have precluded the development of natural gas refineries. (WSJ)
- December 18: During a press conference, Iranian Deputy Foreign Minister Abbas Maleki states that Iran supports the free flow of oil through the Strait of Hormuz, but reserves the option of closing off the shipping route if it is threatened. Iran recently has admitted to deploying anti-aircraft and anti-ship missiles on Abu Musa, an island strategically located near the Strait of Hormuz's shipping lanes. (DJ)
- December 30: The United Nations announces that a total of 21 contracts have been approved for the limited Iraqi oil sales under U.N. Resolution 986. The approved contracts will allow for 43.68 million barrels (6,945,000 m^{3}) of oil to be exported in the first 90 days of the sale. At present, exports of 26.37 million barrels (4,192,000 m^{3}) have been approved for the second 90-day period of the sale, which allows Iraq to sell up to $1 billion worth of oil every 90 days for an initial 6-month period. In mid-December 1996, Iraq restarted the Kirkuk-Ceyhan pipeline, which is expected to carry up to 450,000 bbl/d (72,000 m^{3}/d) of oil under the sales agreements approved so far under U.N. Resolution 986. Iraq's remaining oil exports will flow through the Mina al-Bakr terminal. (NYT, DJ)

== 1997 ==
Sources include: Dow Jones (DJ), The New York Times (NYT), and the Washington Post (WP).

- February 5: Japan's Ministry of Finance announces plans to cut import tariffs on crude oil and most petroleum products from April 1, 1997, in a phased process that will reduce the country's crude oil import tariff rate to zero in April 2002. (DJ)
- February 24: Qatar inaugurates the world's largest liquefied natural gas (LNG) exporting facility and formally launches Qatar Liquefied Gas Co., which will have total output capacity of 6 million tons per year of LNG. The facilities are part of a new $7.2 billion industrial zone which also includes a sea port with a capacity to handle 25-30 million tons of LNG annually. Qatar plans to build more gas liquefaction plants in the area to exploit its natural gas reserves of around 237 trillion cubic feet (6,700 km^{3}). (DJ)
- April 1: A Shell spokesman confirms the company will declare force majeure at its Nigerian Bonny terminal due to local protests which disrupted 210 million barrels per day (33,000,000 m^{3}/d) of the company's oil production. Although the protests have ended and production is returning to normal, the backlog is temporarily delaying loadings by 3 days. (DJ)
- May 16: A final agreement creating the Caspian Pipeline Consortium (CPC) is signed by project participants: Russia (24 percent), Kazakhstan (19 percent), Chevron (15 percent), AO Lukoil/Arco Corp. (12.5 percent), Mobil (7.5 percent), AO Rosneft/Shell Corp. (7.5 percent), Oman (7 percent), Agip SpA (2 percent), British Gas (2 percent), Oryx Corp. (1.75 percent), and Kazakhstan Pipeline Ventures, a joint venture of Kazakhstan's state oil company and Amoco Corp. (1.75 percent). The Russian government plans to transfer its stake to two Russian oil companies, AO Lukoil and AO Rosneft. CPC plans to begin building a 932-mile (1,500 km) pipeline to transport crude oil from the Caspian region to Russia's Black Sea coast in 1998 and begin shipping around 558 million barrels per day (88,700,000 m^{3}/d) of oil in 1999 (planned peak capacity is 1.4 million barrels per day (220,000 m^{3}/d)). (DJ)
- May 20: U.S. president Bill Clinton signs an executive order barring new U.S. investment in Burma (also known as Myanmar), effective May 21 and renewable annually. U.S. companies have invested about $250 million in Burma, primarily in the oil and gas sector. The biggest U.S. investor is Unocal, which is building (with France's Total) a $1.2 billion pipeline from Burma's Yadana natural gas field to an electric power plant in Thailand. (DJ)
- June 4: In a unanimous vote, the United Nations Security Council renews for another 180-day period its "oil for food" initiative with Iraq. Under the resolution, Iraq may sell $2 billion worth of oil to buy food, medicine and other necessities to alleviate civilian suffering under the sanctions imposed when it invaded Kuwait in 1990. (WP)
- July 22: The first shipments of oil produced from Kazakhstan's Tengiz field arrive at terminals on the Black Sea in Novorossiysk (Russia) and Batumi (Georgia) for subsequent export through the Bosphoros Strait. Volumes total between 100,000 and 150 million barrels per day (24,000,000 m^{3}/d). (DJ)
- July 23: The U.S. State Department rules that Turkey's August 1996 agreement to purchase $23 billion worth of natural gas from Iran over a 20-year period does not violate the Iran and Libya Sanctions Act. In a May 1997 memorandum of understanding with Iran and Turkmenistan, Turkey modified the original arrangement so that the natural gas will be purchased from Turkmenistan rather than Iran. (DJ)
- August 4: In Colombia, Occidental Petroleum, a California-based international oil company, and Ecopetrol, Colombia's national oil company, declare force majeure on all oil exports from the Cano Limon field. The declaration comes after a series of attacks dating back to July 30 knocked out a major oil pipeline transporting oil from the field to the Caribbean port of Covenas. The pipeline has been attacked 45 times this year which is equal to the total number of attacks for 1996. Responsibility for the attacks has not been determined, but leftist guerrillas from the National Liberation Army are usually blamed for such attacks. The force majeure declaration does not apply to the oil contained in the 2-million-barrels (320,000 m^{3}) storage facility at Covenas. (DJ)
- August 8: The United Nations approves a sale-price formula for Iraqi crude oil sales under the oil-for-food plan. The approval cleared the way for Iraq to resume limited oil exports immediately through the Turkish port of Ceyhan on the Mediterranean Sea and Iraq's Persian Gulf port of Mina al-Bakr. The United Nations will also begin reviewing contracts for Iraqi crude oil purchases. Iraq has until September 5 to raise the $1.07 billion allowed under the existing 90-day oil-for-food plan window. Iraqi officials state they will boost exports to 2 million barrels per day (320,000 m^{3}/d) to meet the sales target. However, industry experts say that Iraq's export capacity is untested beyond 1.4-million-barrels-per-day (220,000 m^{3}/d). (DJ)
- September 12: The United Nations Security Council passes a resolution that allows Iraq to reach the $2.14 billion oil sales limit under its oil-for-food program by December 5. The current 6-month oil sales window, running from June 8 to December 5, will be split into a 120-day segment and a 60-day segment instead of two 90-day segments. During each segment Iraq can sell $1.07 billion worth of oil. The resolution should enable Iraq to make up for lost revenues during a delay in the start of oil sales during the first two months of the current six-month sale period. (DJ)
- October 29: Iraq's Revolution Command Council, the country's main decision-making body, announces that it will no longer allow U.S. citizens and U.S. aircraft to serve with the United Nations (U.N.) arms inspection teams. The council's statement gives U.S. citizens working with the inspection teams one week to leave Iraq. Iraq has also asked the U.N. to stop flights by American reconnaissance aircraft monitoring its compliance with U.N. resolutions requiring the elimination of weapons of mass destruction. In response to this statement, the U.N. Security Council unanimously approves a statement condemning Iraq's threats to expel the Americans. (DJ)
- November 20: Iraq's Revolution Command Council formally endorses an agreement, arranged by Russia, that enables United Nations' (U.N.) weapons inspection teams to resume operations in Iraq. The deal ends a three-week standoff between the U.N. and Iraq that began in late October 1997 after Iraq announced it would no longer allow U.S. citizens to serve on U.N. weapons' inspection teams. (DJ)
- November 29: For the first time in four years, OPEC agrees to an increase in its production ceiling. OPEC has raised the ceiling to 27.5 million barrels per day (4,370,000 m^{3}/d) for the first half of 1998, effective January 1, 1998. The new ceiling represents a 10 percent increase over the current ceiling. The new quotas are as follows: Saudi Arabia 8.76 million barrels per day (1,393,000 m^{3}/d) (bbl/d), Iran 3.942 Mbbl/d (626,700 m^{3}/d), Iraq 1.314 Mbbl/d (208,900 m^{3}/d), Venezuela 2.583 Mbbl/d (410,700 m^{3}/d), Nigeria 2.042 Mbbl/d (324,700 m^{3}/d), Indonesia 1.456 Mbbl/d (231,500 m^{3}/d), Kuwait 2.19 Mbbl/d (348,000 m^{3}/d), Libya 1.522 Mbbl/d (242,000 m^{3}/d), United Arab Emirates 2.366 Mbbl/d (376,200 m^{3}/d), Algeria 0.909 Mbbl/d (144,500 m^{3}/d), and Qatar 0.414 Mbbl/d (65,800 m^{3}/d). (NYT)
- December 4: Iraq's United Nations (U.N.) Ambassador Nizar Hamdoon warns that Iraq will not allow oil to flow during a third six-month phase of the U.N.'s oil-for-food sale until the U.N. approves an aid distribution plan. Despite the warning, the U.N. Security Council approves a third six-month phase following the end of the second six-month phase. Like the first two phases, the third phase allows Iraq to sell up to $1.07 billion of oil in each of two 90-day periods. However, the sales level may be increased by the Security Council in January 1998 after U.N. Secretary-General Kofi Annan reports on Iraq's needs. The next day Iraq stops pumping oil into the Iraqi–Turkish pipeline at the end of the second six-month phase of the United Nations (U.N.) oil-for-food program. (WP, NYT)
- December 11: Delegates from 150 industrial nations attending a United Nations climate conference in Kyoto, Japan reach agreement on a protocol to control heat-trapping greenhouse gases. The protocol, if ratified, would commit nations to roll back emissions of six greenhouse gases (carbon dioxide, methane, nitrous oxide, hydrofluorocarbons, perfluorocarbons, and sulfur hexafluoride) below 1990 levels. Under the protocol, the United States would be required to reduce its greenhouse gas emissions by 7 percent below 1990 levels, while Europe and Japan would make cuts of 8 percent and 9 percent, respectively. Developing countries are exempt from the emissions ceilings for the time being. (DJ)

== 1998 ==
Sources include: Dow Jones (DJ), New York Times (NYT), Wall Street Journal (WSJ), and the Washington Post (WP).

- January 7: Due to the continuing Asian economic crisis, South Korea's refiners have reportedly cut operations to around 80 percent of capacity. The refiners have also had difficulty securing crude oil supplies for delivery in late January or February, which could cut operations to as low as 70 percent-75 percent of capacity. (DJ)
- January 15: Environmentalists hail the implementation of a 50-year moratorium on mining and oil exploration in the Antarctic. A protocol for the protection of the Antarctic was adopted by twenty-six countries in 1991, but it could not be implemented until Japan's ratification cleared the way last month. Antarctica contains 70 percent of the world's fresh water, and the moratorium attempts to preserve the world's least polluted continent. (WP)
- February 5: Following a ruling by a federal judge denying a request from environmentalists and Native Americans seeking to block the sale of the Elk Hills Naval Petroleum Reserve, the U.S. Department of Energy formally transfers ownership of the reserve to Occidental Petroleum Corporation. Occidental purchased a 78 percent interest in the field for $3.65 billion. Chevron Corporation currently holds the remaining 22 percent. Elk Hills contains 450 million barrels (72,000,000 m^{3}) of proven oil reserves; however, officials from Occidental believe the reserve may contain one billion barrels of recoverable reserves. (DJ)
- February 20: The United Nations (U.N.) Security Council votes unanimously to more than double the amount of oil Iraq can export under the U.N. oil-for-food program. The Security Council's vote increases the amount Iraq can export from $2.14 billion to $5.26 billion over six months. Iraq maintains that it only has the capability to export up to $4 billion over a six-month period. (DJ)
- March 31: OPEC releases an official communique from its 104th (extraordinary) meeting convened in Vienna, Austria, on March 30, 1998. The communique states that member countries have agreed to voluntary cuts from each country's current production levels in an attempt to boost oil prices. OPEC has agreed to cuts totaling 1.245 million barrels per day (197,900 m^{3}/d) effective April 1, 1998. The cuts, in barrels per day, break down as follows: Algeria 50,000; Indonesia 70,000; Iran 140,000; Kuwait 125, 000; Libya 80,000; Nigeria 125,000; Qatar 30,000; Saudi Arabia 300,000; United Arab Emirates 125,000; and Venezuela 200,000. In addition, non-OPEC oil-producing countries Mexico, Oman, and Yemen have agreed to cut production by 100,000, 30,000, and 20 million barrels per day (3,200,000 m^{3}/d), respectively. Moreover, a third non-OPEC country, Norway, the world's third largest oil exporter, has pledged to reduce its oil production by 3 percent, or approximately 100 million barrels per day (16,000,000 m^{3}/d). However, Norway's cuts will not take effect until mid-April 1998. (Cuts are from February production based on secondary sources.) (DJ) (WSJ)(NYT)
- May 4: The Atlantic Richfield Company (ARCO) announces that it will acquire Union Texas Petroleum Holdings Incorporated, an independent oil company based in Houston, Texas, for $2.47 billion. The acquisition will add 140 million barrels per day (22,000,000 m^{3}/d) to ARCO's oil and natural gas production and increase ARCO's total oil and gas reserves by 14 percent. The deal also helps ARCO enter the Caspian Sea region, with ARCO gaining a 12.5 percent interest in the Caspian Pipeline Consortium and a 5 percent interest in Kazakhstan's Tengiz oil filed. ARCO also will gain additional interests in projects located in the United Kingdom, Indonesia, Alaska, and Venezuela. (NYT) (WSJ)
- May 11: India announces that it has conducted three underground nuclear tests, the country's first since 1974. The tests were conducted simultaneously 330 miles (530 km) southwest of New Delhi, near the Pakistani border. The Indian government indicates that the three tests included a thermonuclear device, commonly known as a hydrogen bomb. Two days later, on May 13, 1998, India announces that it has conducted two more underground nuclear tests in the same desert range. (WP) (DJ)
- June 19: The United Nations (U.N.) Security Council unanimously approves a resolution allowing Iraq to spend $300 million on spare parts for its oil industry. The funding is intended to help Iraq increase oil exports under the fourth phase of the U.N.'s oil-for-food program. The spare parts are expected to expand Iraq's oil export capacity from 1.6 million barrels per day (250,000 m^{3}/d) to 1.8 million or 1.9 million barrels per day (300,000 m^{3}/d). (NYT) (DJ)
- June 24: OPEC agrees, at its 105th ministerial conference, to another round of oil production cuts. In recent weeks oil prices have fallen to their lowest levels in more than a decade. OPEC members have agreed to cut production by 1.355 million barrels per day (215,400 m^{3}/d), effective July 1, 1998, bringing the group's total reductions since March 1998 to 2.6 million barrels per day (410,000 m^{3}/d). Together with promises from non-OPEC nations such as Russia, Oman, and Mexico, world oil producers have pledged to cut worldwide production by approximately 3.1 million barrels per day (490,000 m^{3}/d). (WP) (WSJ) (NYT)
- August 11: BP announces that it will acquire Amoco for $48.2 billion in stock. If the merger is approved by regulators and shareholders of both companies, it will be the largest oil industry merger and the largest foreign take-over of a U.S. company to date. The company will be known as BP Amoco, and it will be the world's third-largest multinational oil company in terms of net income behind Exxon and Shell. (NYT) (WSJ) (WP)
- October 1: South Korea's oil refining sector fully deregulates, allowing for 100 percent foreign investment. Originally, South Korea had expected to fully deregulate its refining industry by January 1999, but it decided to move up the date in order to help reform its economy. (DJ)
- October 7: European Union (EU) nations approve an accord in which European car makers will voluntarily agree to cut carbon dioxide emissions 25 percent by 2008. EU officials say they will seek similar deals with automakers in Asia and North America. (WP)
- October 28: Japan's Nippon Oil, the country's second largest petroleum distributor and Mitsubishi Oil Company, the sixth-ranking company in the industry, agree to merge as of April 1, 1999. The combined company will be the largest oil distributor in Japan. (WSJ)
- December 2: Exxon agrees to buy Mobil for approximately $75.4 billion, which will make ExxonMobil company the largest corporation in the U.S. The companies say they expect to cut about 9,000 jobs from their combined worldwide workforce of 122,700 and to close offices, saving $730 million. The merger comes in the context of low oil prices, which have hurt profits at many oil companies. (DJ)
- December 23: The Colombian government says it will allow gasoline and diesel prices to float with international oil prices starting January 1, 1999. The move will end a system of artificial price fixing which has cost the government more than $3.2 billion in subsidies over the past five years. (DJ)

== 1999 ==
Sources include: Dow Jones (DJ), The New York Times (NYT), The Wall Street Journal (WSJ), and The Washington Post (WP).

- January 1: BP and Amoco complete their $53 billion merger. Chicago-based Amoco is the United States' fifth-largest oil company with roughly 9,300 gasoline stations. London-based British Petroleum, the world's third largest oil company, sells its products through a network of about 17,900 stations. (DJ)
- February 4: Italy's ENI SpA and Russia's RAO Gazprom, the world's largest natural gas producer, agree to build a natural gas pipeline from Russia to Turkey at a cost of nearly $3 billion. Each project partner will hold a 50 percent stake in the project. The proposed pipeline, called the Blue Stream project, is expensive by industry standards partly because it would run at great depth under the waters of the Black Sea. (Asian WSJ)
- February 10: U.S. Energy Secretary Bill Richardson visits Saudi Arabia to discuss potential U.S. investment in the Kingdom's oil and gas sectors. Following his visit, Richardson says the Saudis are primarily interested in foreign investment in the natural gas sector and in the oil refining and marketing sectors, rather than in the upstream crude oil sector. Secretary Richardson's visit comes several months after a September 1998 meeting between several U.S. oil companies, Saudi Crown Prince Abdullah and Saudi Oil Minister Ali Naimi, in which Abdullah requested proposals from the companies on the development of Saudi oil reserves. (DJ, WSJ)
- March 23: In an effort to raise oil prices, which fell sharply in late 1997 and stayed low through 1998 and into early 1999, OPEC and non-OPEC countries agree to cut oil output by a combined 2.104 million barrels per day (334,500 m^{3}/d), effective April 1, 1999, for one year. OPEC members have pledged to cut 1.716 million barrels per day (272,800 m^{3}/d), while several non-OPEC countries have pledged total reductions of 388 million barrels per day (61,700,000 m^{3}/d). During 1998, due mainly to low oil prices, OPEC crude oil export revenues fell 30 percent (to $100 billion) from the previous year. (DJ, NYT)
- March 31: Arco agrees to be acquired by BP Amoco PLC for $26.6 billion in stock. If approved, the merger will create the largest oil producer in the United States and one of the largest energy companies in the world. The deal marks the fourth largest oil company merger since the onset of low oil prices in late 1997. (DJ), (WSJ)
- April 5: Following the arrival in the Netherlands of two Libyan suspects in the 1988 bombing of Pan American Flight 103 that killed 270 people, United Nations sanctions against Libya are suspended. The sanctions, imposed on March 31, 1992, initially included a ban on the sale of equipment for refining and transporting oil, but excluded oil production equipment. Sanctions were then expanded on November 11, 1993, to include a freeze on Libya's overseas assets, excluding revenue from oil, natural gas, or agricultural products. (DJ)
- April 15: The U.S. Department of Energy (DOE) announces that it will begin taking oil deliveries within the next few days under its plan to add 28 million barrels (4,500,000 m^{3}) of oil to the U.S. Government's Strategic Petroleum Reserve (SPR) from Federal oil royalty payments. In Phase 1 of the plan, the SPR is expected to acquire about 43 million barrels per day (6,800,000 m^{3}/d) over the next 3 months from oil companies operating in the Gulf of Mexico. Although about 50 percent of the oil supplied in Phase 1 will be imported, domestic producers would still benefit from the entire acquisition since the oil market is international and fungible, according to a DOE official. Under Phase 2 of the program, the DOE expects to acquire about 100 million barrels per day (16,000,000 m^{3}/d) of royalty oil over a 6-month period. (DJ)
- April 17: An oil pipeline that transports oil from Baku, Azerbaijan, to Suspa, Georgia, is officially opened. This is the second pipeline dedicated to exporting Caspian Sea oil, but the first built since the Soviet Union disbanded in 1991. The other Caspian Sea oil pipeline, which runs through the Russian breakaway republic of Chechnya to the Russian port of Novorossisk, is often shut down. The new pipeline to Georgia has a capacity of 100 million barrels per day (16,000,000 m^{3}/d). (DJ)
- April 28: The U.S. Department of Treasury's Office of Foreign Asset Control (OFAC), notifies Mobil that it has turned down Mobil's request for a license to swap crude oil it produces in Turkmenistan in exchange for Iranian oil. Mobil had hoped to be allowed to ship oil produced in Turkmenistan to northern Iranian oil refineries, while Iran, in turn, would provide Iranian oil from Iran's Persian Gulf export terminals to Mobil for shipment to global markets as payment. OFAC is responsible for enforcing U.S. unilateral sanctions against foreign countries. As a result of OFAC's denial of a swap arrangement with Iran, Mobil will have to continue exporting its Turkmenistan oil production across the Caspian Sea by barge to Azerbaijan, where it is then carried by rail or pipeline to Black Sea ports. (DJ, WP)
- May 1: U.S. President Clinton unveils a plan to apply the same standard for tailpipe emissions to cars, light-duty trucks, and most sport utility vehicles (SUVs). Based on current nitrogen oxides (NOx) emission levels, the proposed plan would result in a 77 percent reduction for cars and a 95 percent reduction for light-duty trucks and SUVs. The new standards would be phased in from the 2004 to 2007 model years. At the same time, the Environmental Protection Agency (EPA) proposes a rule that would require refiners to reduce gasoline sulfur content from a current average of nearly 330 parts per million (ppm) to 30 ppm. The new sulfur standard is being proposed in conjunction with the new tailpipe emission proposal since sulfur impedes catalytic converter efficiency, thus making it more difficult to reduce tailpipe emissions without reducing sulfur content in gasoline. Oil industry representatives have vowed to protest the proposed rule, claiming that it will cost refiners $3 billion to $6 billion. The EPA estimates that the cost of compliance for both the automobile and oil industries will be between $3.4 billion and $4.4 billion. (DJ)
- May 10: The Board of Argentine oil company YPF unanimously approved a $13.4 billion offer from Repsol, a Spanish company. Repsol, which already owns 14.99 percent of YPF, made an all-cash offer to purchase the remaining 85.01 percent last month. The Board recommended to all shareholders to accept the Repsol offer. Two Argentine provinces, which own about five percent of YPF's shares, remain concerned about Repsol's intentions for their regions. (WSJ)
- May 12: The Caspian Pipeline Consortium (CPC) begins construction of a 981-mile (1,579 km) pipeline that will carry crude oil from the Caspian Sea to the Russian port of Novorossisk for export to foreign markets. The pipeline's planned capacity is about 1.3 million barrels per day (210,000 m^{3}/d), and the CPC is expecting to load the first tanker in mid-2001. (DJ)
- May 17: The Environmental Protection Agency (EPA) states that it will not change its "Tier Two Plan" to cut gasoline sulfur content and tailpipe emissions, in response to a recent appellate court ruling that the EPA had overstepped its mandate in implementing some provisions of the Clean Air Act. Beginning in 2004, the Tier Two Plan would require refiners to cut gasoline sulfur content to an average of 30 parts per million, down more than 90 percent from the current national average. (DJ)
- May 27: Exxon and Mobil shareholders approve an $81.2 billion merger, in which Exxon will issue 1.32 shares for each share of Mobil's approximately 780.2 million shares outstanding. The merger still must receive regulatory approval from the U.S. government and the European Union. The chairmen of both companies state that they expect regulatory approvals to be obtained by the end of the third quarter of 1999. (DJ)
- June 1: Sudan starts pumping oil through its pipeline linking the Heglig oil field in Western Kordofan province to Port Sudan on the Red Sea. The pipeline has a capacity of 250 million barrels per day (40,000,000 m^{3}/d), and was financed by a consortium of Chinese, Malaysian, Canadian, and Sudanese firms. (DJ)
- August 9: The United States Department of Commerce dismisses a petition filed by Save Domestic Oil, Inc. under anti-dumping statutes. The petition alleged that Saudi Arabia, Venezuela, Mexico, and Iraq had sold crude oil to the United States at artificially low prices. The decision was based on the Department of Commerce's determination that "opposition to the petitions exceeded support." Majority support is defined as petitioner representation of at least 25 percent of the domestic industry and support from at least 50 percent of the industry expressing an opinion. Support from a majority in the affected industry is necessary under the law for Commerce to commence a formal investigation of an anti-dumping complaint. (DJ, WP, NYT)
- September 14: French oil companies Total Fina and Elf Aquitaine agree to merge, after a lengthy takeover battle, in a deal which will form the world's fourth largest oil company. The deal will give Elf Aquitaine shareholders 19 shares of Total Fina for every 13 shares of Elf Aquitaine. According to Total Fina's management, the merger will result in annual cost savings for the combined firm of $1.56 billion. (WP, WSJ)
- September 22: OPEC, at a meeting of its member states' oil ministers, decides to maintain current production cuts until March 2000, despite the fact the crude oil prices have doubled since early 1999. In another development, OPEC announces that its current secretary general, Nigerian Rilwanu Lukman, will stay in office until March 2000. The announcement follows a vigorously contested race to succeed Lukman in the post, in which OPEC's three largest members, Saudi Arabia, Iran, and Iraq, had fielded candidates. (DJ)
- September 28: Iranian Oil Minister Bijan Zanganeh announces that the National Iranian Oil Company has discovered a new oilfield, Azadegan, with 26 billion barrels (4.1×10^{9} m^{3}) of crude oil in Khuzestan province. The discovery is the largest new find in Iran in the last three decades. Zanganeh expects the field to produce between 300,000 and 400 million barrels per day (64,000,000 m^{3}/d) of crude oil three to four years after development begins next year. (DJ)
- September 30: Japan suffers a serious nuclear accident at a uranium processing plant in Tokaimura, in which radiation is released after an apparent uncontrolled nuclear chain reaction. Three workers at the plant, operated by JCO, Inc., are injured. Japanese authorities issue a warning instructing 310,000 people in neighboring communities to stay indoors. (DJ, WSJ)
- October 4: The United Nations Security Council agrees to raise the monetary ceiling on Iraqi oil sales to $8.3 billion from $5.26 billion, guaranteeing the continuation of Iraqi production until the November 20 end date for the current six-month extension of the "oil-for-food" program. The move is a one time adjustment, and does not bind the Security Council to continue a higher ceiling if the program is renewed for another six-month term. The increase reflects the difference between previous monetary ceilings and actual Iraqi sales during previous phases of the program. (DJ)
- November 18: The heads of state of Turkey, Azerbaijan, and Georgia sign an agreement to build a pipeline for the export of crude oil from the Caspian Depression. The 1,080-mile (1,740 km) pipeline will begin at the Azerbaijani capital, Baku, and run through Georgia and Turkey to the Turkish port of Ceyhan. The project is expected to cost $2.4 billion, and the government of Turkey has offered guarantees that the cost of the Turkish segment of the pipeline will not exceed $1.4 billion. The signing ceremony took place during a visit to Istanbul by U.S. President Clinton for a summit of the Organization for Cooperation and Security in Europe (OSCE). (WP, NYT)
- November 30: The Federal Trade Commission (FTC) grants approval for the proposed merger between oil giants Exxon and Mobil. The $80 billion merger was approved by the FTC after the firms agreed to the largest divestiture of assets ever involved in a merger. The companies will sell over 2,400 retail outlets, mostly in the Northeast, Texas, and California, and a refinery in California. (DJ)
- December 10: The California Air Resources Board approves a regulatory change that will halve the amount of sulfur allowed in gasoline sold in California from 30 parts per million to 15 parts per million, starting in 2003. The California limit would be half the national limit under a new rule proposed by the Environmental Protection Agency. The current federal sulfur limit for gasoline is 330 parts per million. (WSJ)
- December 21: The Export-Import Bank drops a proposed $500 million loan to Russia's Tyumen Oil after Secretary of State Madeleine Albright exercises her statutory authority to block the transaction. The loan had been controversial in part because of Tyumen Oil's dispute with BP Amoco over the bankruptcy of Russian oil firm Sidanko, in which BP Amoco owns a major stake. BP Amoco and Tyumen Oil later settled the dispute on December 23. (DJ)
- December 31: The Panama Canal Zone reverts to Panamanian sovereignty at noon, after nearly a century of American control. More than a half-million barrels of crude oil and petroleum products transit the Canal each day. (DJ)
- December 31: After nearly two years of construction, ExxonMobil completes the Sable Offshore Energy Project, a $2 billion project to bring natural gas from fields offshore Nova Scotia to the northeastern United States. The fields are estimated to contain 3.5 trillion cubic feet (99 km^{3}) of natural gas. (DJ)
- December 31: Russian President Boris Yeltsin makes a surprise announcement that he is resigning immediately. Vladimir Putin becomes Acting President, and presidential elections will be held within 90 days, with a date to be set by the State Duma. Russia is the largest exporter of energy in the world. (DJ)
