= 1998 world oil market chronology =

This is a chronology of the 1998 world oil market.

== Chronology ==
- January 7: Due to the continuing Asian economic crisis, South Korea's refiners reportedly cut operations to around 80 percent of capacity. The refiners also had difficulty securing crude oil supplies for delivery scheduled in late January or February, which could cut operations to as low as 70 percent-75 percent of capacity. (Dow Jones)
- January 15: Environmentalists hail the implementation of a 50-year moratorium on mining and oil exploration in the Antarctic. A protocol for the protection of the Antarctic was adopted by twenty-six countries in 1991, but it could not be implemented until Japan's ratification cleared the way last month. Antarctica contains 70 percent of the world's fresh water, and the moratorium attempts to preserve the world's least polluted continent. (WP)
- February 5: Following a ruling by a federal judge denying a request from environmentalists and Native Americans seeking to block the sale of the Elk Hills Naval Petroleum Reserve, the U.S. Department of Energy formally transfers ownership of the reserve to Occidental Petroleum Corporation. Occidental purchased a 78 percent interest in the field for $3.65 billion. Chevron Corporation currently holds the remaining 22 percent. Elk Hills contains 450 million barrels (72,000,000 m^{3}) of proven oil reserves; however, officials from Occidental believe the reserve may contain one billion barrels of recoverable reserves. (DJ)
- February 20: The United Nations Security Council votes unanimously to more than double the amount of oil Iraq can export under the U.N. Oil-for-Food Programme. The Security Council's vote increases the amount Iraq can export from $2.14 billion to $5.26 billion over six months. Iraq maintains that it only has the capability to export up to $4 billion over a six-month period. (DJ)
- March 31: OPEC releases an official communique from its 104th (extraordinary) meeting convened in Vienna, Austria, on March 30, 1998. The communique states that member countries have agreed to voluntary cuts from each country's current production levels in an attempt to boost oil prices. OPEC has agreed to cuts totaling 1.245 million barrels per day (197,900 m^{3}/d) effective April 1, 1998. Moreover, a third non-OPEC country, Norway, the world's third largest oil exporter, has pledged to reduce its oil production by 3 percent, or approximately 100,000 barrels per day (16,000 m^{3}/d). However, Norway's cuts will not take effect until mid-April 1998. (Cuts are from February production based on secondary sources.) (DJ) (WSJ)(NYT)
- May 4: The Atlantic Richfield Company (ARCO) announces that it will acquire Union Texas Petroleum Holdings Incorporated, an independent oil company based in Houston, Texas, for $2.47 billion. The acquisition will add 140,000 barrels per day (22,000 m^{3}/d) to ARCO's oil and natural gas production and increase ARCO's total oil and gas reserves by 14 percent. The deal also helps ARCO enter the Caspian Sea region, with ARCO gaining a 12.5 percent interest in the Caspian Pipeline Consortium and a 5 percent interest in Kazakhstan's Tengiz oil filed. ARCO also will gain additional interests in projects located in the United Kingdom, Indonesia, Alaska, and Venezuela. (NYT) (WSJ)
- May 11: India announces that it has conducted three underground nuclear tests, the country's first since 1974. The tests were conducted simultaneously 330 miles (530 km) southwest of New Delhi, near the Pakistani border. The Indian government indicates that the three tests included a thermonuclear device, commonly known as a hydrogen bomb. Two days later, on May 13, 1998, India announces that it has conducted two more underground nuclear tests in the same desert range. (WP) (DJ)
- June 19: The United Nations (U.N.) Security Council unanimously approves a resolution allowing Iraq to spend $300 million on spare parts for its oil industry. The funding is intended to help Iraq increase oil exports under the fourth phase of the U.N.'s oil-for-food program. The spare parts are expected to expand Iraq's oil export capacity from 1.6 million barrels per day (250,000 m^{3}/d) to 1.8 million barrels per day (290,000 m^{3}/d) or 1.9 million barrels per day (300,000 m^{3}/d). (NYT) (DJ)
- June 24: OPEC agrees, at its 105th ministerial conference, to another round of oil production cuts. In recent weeks oil prices have fallen to their lowest levels in more than a decade. OPEC members have agreed to cut production by 1.355 million barrels per day (215,400 m^{3}/d), effective July 1, 1998, bringing the group's total reductions since March 1998 to 2.6 million barrels per day (410,000 m^{3}/d). Together with promises from non-OPEC nations such as Russia, Oman, and Mexico, world oil producers have pledged to cut worldwide production by approximately 3.1 million barrels per day (490,000 m^{3}/d). (WP) (WSJ) (NYT)
- August 11: BP announces that it will acquire Amoco for $48.2 billion in stock. If the merger is approved by regulators and shareholders of both companies, it will be the largest oil industry merger and the largest foreign take-over of a U.S. company to date. The company will be known as BP Amoco, and it will be the world's third-largest multinational oil company in terms of net income behind Exxon and Shell. (NYT) (WSJ) (WP)
- October 1: South Korea's oil refining sector fully deregulates, allowing for 100 percent foreign investment. Originally, South Korea had expected to fully deregulate its refining industry by January 1999, but it decided to move up the date in order to help reform its economy. (DJ)
- October 7: European Union (EU) nations approve an accord in which European car makers will voluntarily agree to cut carbon dioxide emissions 25 percent by 2008. EU officials say they will seek similar deals with automakers in Asia and North America. (WP)
- October 28: Japan's Nippon Oil Company, the country's second largest petroleum distributor and Mitsubishi Oil Company, the sixth-ranking company in the industry, agree to merge as of April 1, 1999. The combined company will be the largest oil distributor in Japan. (WSJ)
- December 2: Exxon Corporation agrees to buy Mobil Corporation for approximately $75.4 billion, which will make the company the largest corporation in the U.S. The companies say they expect to cut about 9,000 jobs from their combined worldwide workforce of 122,700 and to close offices, saving $730 million. The merger comes in the context of low oil prices, which have hurt profits at many oil companies. (DJ)
- December 23: The Colombian government says it will allow gasoline and diesel prices to float with international oil prices starting January 1, 1999. The move will end a system of artificial price fixing which has cost the government more than $3.2 billion in subsidies over the past five years. (DJ)

== Sources ==
Sources include: Dow Jones (DJ), The New York Times (NYT), The Wall Street Journal (WSJ) and The Washington Post(WP).

- Energy Information Administration: Chronology of World Oil Market Events
- Commodity Research Bureau. The CRB Commodity Yearbook 1998, 1998.

previous year: 1997 world oil market chronology	This article is part of the Chronology of world oil market events (1970-2005)	following year: 1999 world oil market chronology
