= Suspa =

German suspension manufacturer

SUSPA GmbH
- Company type: Public (GmbH)
- Founded: 1951
- Headquarters: Altdorf near Nuremberg, Germany
- Products: Gas springs, dampers, adjustment systems, crash management
- Revenue: € 208 million (2014)
- Number of employees: 1,720 (31 December 2014)
- Website: www.suspa.com

SUSPA GmbH is a manufacturer of gas springs, dampers, height adjustment systems, crash management systems and safety systems for many different industries. In 2014, the company, located in Altdorf near Nuremberg, Germany had approximately 208 million EUR in sales with 1,720 employees.

== Company history ==
1951 SUSPA Suspension Technology GmbH was inaugurated and manufactured spring struts for two-wheel vehicles. 1959 SUSPA develops a damping system for washing machines which ends the irritating "bouncing". Just three years later SUSPA is the market leader. The first products for the automobile industry are gas springs for opening and closing of tailgates in 1964. 1969 SUSPA develops a height adjustment system and a positioning system for backrests of office chairs.1973–1978 SUSPA expands in Europe, Asia and America; SUSPA develops silicone-damped impact absorbers for automobiles. 1988 SUSPA diversifies to a three-component water paint system and thus protects the environment by abstaining from using solvents and amines. 1991 SUSPA develops height adjustment systems for tables and work surfaces. 1994 a new business is founded in India. The mass production of spoiler adjustment systems begins in 1999 and SUSPA becomes a system supplier for the automotive industry. One year later SUSPA produces its first crash management system and opens an assembly plant in the Czech Republic. In 2003 the production capacities in Asia are expanded. Steadily increasing price competition in the world market coupled with heavily increased material costs forces SUSPA in 2008 to stop manufacturing gas springs for chairs and to focus more on the core business (Automotive and Industry). In June 2009 the company Tyrol Equity from Austria purchases 80 per cent of the company shares. In June 2012 the Tyrolean Industry Holding sells their SUSPA shares to the private investor group Andlinger & Company GmbH.

== Company Structure ==
The company is divided into two divisions, with the business segments Mechanical Applications, Crash Management, Household Applications and Powered Applications.

SUSPA has the following subsidiary companies:

- SUSPA GmbH, plants in Altdorf near Nuremberg (Germany) and Sulzbach-Rosenberg (Germany)
- SUSPA Vertriebsgesellschaft mbH, Kleve (Germany)
- SUSPA CZ, Bor (Czech Republic)
- SUSPA Incorporated, Grand Rapids (Michigan, United States)
- SUSPA Pneumatics (India) Pvt. Ltd., Chennai (India)
- SUSPA (Nanjing) Co. Ltd., Nanjing (People's Republic of China)

== Products ==
The most important product is the gas spring offered in many different varieties, but during the last few years SUSPA has expanded its capabilities to become a system supplier, especially for the automotive industry, for which they develop and produce complete adjustment- or crash management systems. SUSPA adds value to the gas spring by adding more features; hence, e.g. table columns which can easily be operated and only consist of one single gas spring (Product: VARISTAND).

=== Gas Springs ===
- Non-Locking Gas springs for automotive and industrial applications
- Lockable Gas springs

=== Dampers ===
- Hydraulic Dampers
- Friction Dampers

=== Adjustment Systems ===
- Automotive Powered Spoilers
- Seat Comfort Drives
- Powered Tailgates and Trunklids
- Convertible Roof Power Closures
- Office Desk Height Adjustment Systems

=== Crash Management ===
- Crash Management Systems
- Occupants Protection Systems
- Pedestrian Protection Systems

=== Piston Rods and Tubes ===
- Spindles
- Bolts
- Pins
- Piston Rods
- Tubes

== Executive Board ==
Timo Stahl (since 2005), Thomas Peuker (since 2011), Hans Jörg Kaltenbrunner (since 2012)
