= Nizar Hamdoon =

Iraqi politician (1944–2003)

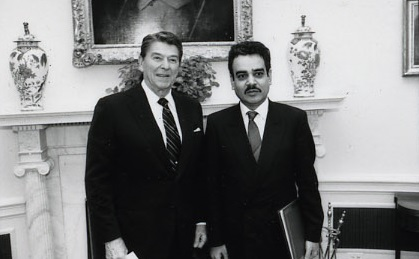
- Hamdoon presented his credentials to President Ronald Reagan in the Oval Office in 1985

Iraqi ambassador to the United States
- In office 1984–1988

Personal details
- Born: May 18, 1944 Mosul, Iraq
- Died: July 4, 2003 (aged 59) New York City, New York
- Education: Baghdad University

Nizar Hamdoon (May 18, 1944 – July 4, 2003) was Iraq's ambassador to the United States from 1984 to 1988 and to the United Nations from 1992 to 1998. He was also the deputy Foreign Minister from 1988 to 1992 and undersecretary of the Foreign Ministry from 1999 to his retirement in 2001.

== Early life and education ==
A Muslim Arab from Mosul, Hamdoon finished his high school studies in Baghdad College then graduated from Baghdad University with a degree in architecture.

== Career ==
He gained attention in the West in 1998 during the Iraq disarmament crisis and the UNSCOM weapons inspections. In a memo he wrote a few months before retiring, he argued that Iraq should be a monarchy and have a constitution written by Iraqis.

== Death ==
Hamdoon died on 4 July 2003 in New York City from pneumonia and non-Hodgkin lymphoma. He was buried in Baghdad ten days later.
