= Abbas Maleki =

Iranian diplomat and professor

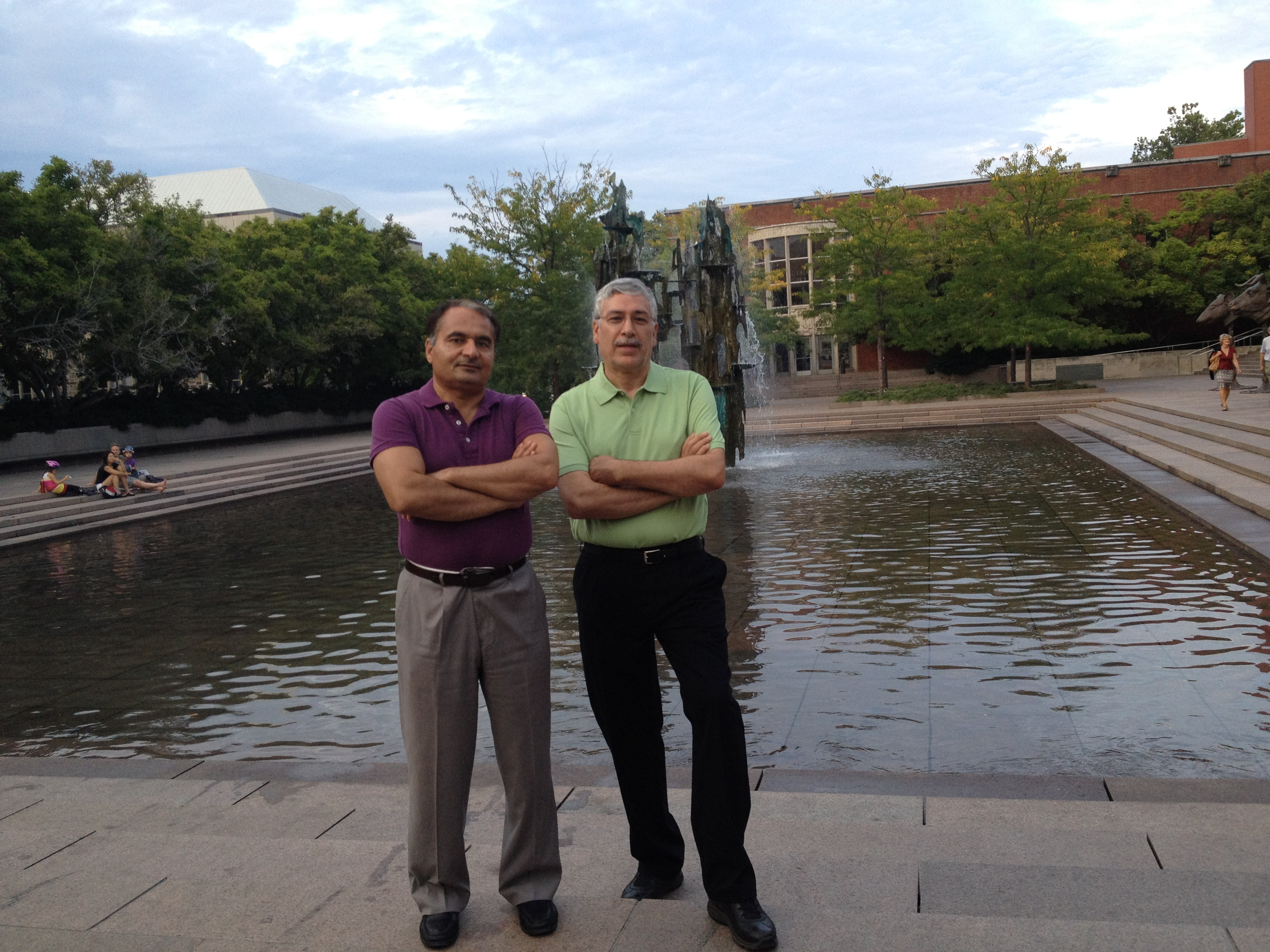
Maleki (Right) with Seyed Hossein Mousavian (Left), Princeton University, 2012

Abbas Maleki is an Iranian associate professor of energy policy in the Department of Energy Engineering and in the research institute for science, technology and industry policy (RISTIP) at Sharif University of Technology in Tehran. He was the former Senior Associate at Belfer Center for Science and International Affairs, Harvard Kennedy School of Government in 2007-2017. He was a member of the Network of Global Agenda Councils of World Economic Forum (Davos) for 2011-12, while he was the Robert E. Wilhelm Fellow at Centre for International Studies, MIT at the same time. He edited his book "US-Iran Misperception: A Dialogue" with John Tirman during this period of time. In his political background, he had been the Deputy Foreign Minister of Iran from 1980 to 1997, and one of the members of the negotiating team for ending the Iran-Iraq War from 1987 to 1992. His educational background is a Ph.D. in Strategic Management from the High University of Strategic Sciences. He has graduated MSc in Industrial Engineering and Management, and a BSc in Mechanical Engineering, both from the Sharif University of Technology. He has several publications on energy policy, energy security, public policy, foreign policy of Iran, the Islamic Revolution of Iran, Central Asia, Transcaucasia, and Caspian Studies.
