= BBP =

BBP may refer to:

== Science ==
- Bailey–Borwein–Plouffe formula, a formula for computing the nth binary digit of $\pi$ directly
- Baseband processor, a device in a network interface that manages all the radio functions
- Benzyl butyl phthalate, a plasticizer in polymers
- Bloodborne pathogens, viruses that can be spread through contamination by blood and other bodily fluids
- Branchpoint Binding Protein, a pre-mRNA processing factor involved in RNA splicing
- Blue Brain Project, Swiss brain research initiative that aims to create a digital reconstruction of rodent, eventually human, brains

== Places ==
- Bayport-Blue Point School District, a school district in Bayport and Blue Point, New York
- Bembridge Airport, on the Isle of Wight, England (IATA airport code: BBP)
- Brooklyn Bridge Park, a park on the Brooklyn side of the East River in New York City

== Other ==
- Bayou Bridge Pipeline, oil pipeline constructed in 2017–19 in Louisiana: the subject of protests due to its environmental impact
- Best Business Practice, method or technique that has consistently shown results superior to those achieved with other means: used as a benchmark
- Binibining Pilipinas, a Filipino beauty pageant
- Bobby's Burger Palace, group of fast food casual restaurants which opened in July 2008 in Lake Grove, New York
- "Boom Boom Pow", a 2009 song by The Black Eyed Peas
- British Bangladeshi Power 100, an annual publication listing the 100 leading British Bangladeshi figures
- Great Union Party (Turkish: Büyük Birlik Partisi), an extreme far-right nationalist political party in Turkey
