= Bayou Bridge Pipeline =

Louisiana pipelilne

Location
- Country: United States
- State: Louisiana
- Direction: Lake Charles to St. James
- Start: Lake Charles, Louisiana
- Passes through: 11 parishes, 8 watersheds
- To: St. James, Louisiana
- Runs alongside: Calcasieu, Jefferson Davis Parish, Acadia Parish, Vermilion Parish, Lafayette Parish, Iberia Parish, St. Martin Parish, Iberville Parish, Ascension Parish, Assumption Parish, St. James Parish

General information
- Type: Crude oil
- Status: Operational
- Owner: Energy Transfer Partners (70%)
- Partners: Phillips 66 (40%), Sunoco Logistics Partners LP (30%)
- Operator: Bayou Bridge, LLC
- Construction started: Phase I began in April 2016
- Expected: Completed in April 2019

Technical information
- Length: 162.5 km (101.0 mi)
- Maximum discharge: 480,000 barrels per day
- Diameter: 24 in (610 mm)
- No. of pumping stations: 2
- Pumping stations: Jefferson Davis and St. Martin parishes

The Bayou Bridge Pipeline (BBP) is a 162.5-mile crude oil pipeline from Lake Charles, Louisiana to St. James, Louisiana by Bayou Bridge, LLC, a subsidiary of Energy Transfer Partners. Communities directly impacted by the pipeline voiced health, economic, and environmental concerns. They filed a lawsuit in opposition to the project and asked the Army Corps of Engineers for an Environmental Impact Statement. The Corps refused to do so and approved the project on 15 December 2017. Water protectors at L'eau Est La Vie camp consistently disrupted construction of the BBP for most of 2018, causing delays and millions of dollars in added cost to the project. They raised environmental justice and social justice issues and concerns about the pipeline's contribution to climate change. The pipeline was eventually completed in April 2019.

== Description ==
The Bayou Bridge Pipeline (BBP), is a 162-mile long 24” crude oil pipeline project through Louisiana's Atchafalaya Basin. It crosses 11 parishes (Calcasieu, Jefferson Davis Parish, Louisiana, Acadia Parish, Louisiana, Vermilion Parish, Louisiana, Lafayette Parish, Louisiana, Iberia Parish, Louisiana, St. Martin Parish, Louisiana, Iberville Parish, Louisiana, Ascension Parish, Louisiana, Assumption Parish, Louisiana, and St. James Parish, Louisiana) and eight watersheds (Lower Calcasieu, Mermentau, Vermilion, Bayou Teche, Atchafalaya, Lower Grand, West Central Louisiana Coastal, and East Central Louisiana Coastal) to connect an oil-and-gas hub in Nederland, Texas with oil refineries in Louisiana. There are two pump stations in Jefferson Davis and St. Martin parishes. It has a capacity of 480,000 barrels per day. As of 2017, the planned cost for the pipeline was $670 million, and the reported final cost was approximately $750 million.

The project was permitted by the U.S. Army Corps of Engineers and the Louisiana Department of Natural Resources.

The BBP complements other pipeline projects including the Dakota Access Pipeline to deliver Bakken crude oil to Gulf Coast refineries.

The pipeline pays annual ad valorem (property taxes) to Louisiana that the state uses to fund local services such as education, police and fire departments, and public infrastructure. In 2025, the state assessed the pipeline for $80.9 million in ad valorem taxes.

=== Ownership ===
The Bayou Bridge Pipeline is a joint venture between Energy Transfer and a subsidiary of Phillips 66, in which Energy Transfer has a 60% ownership interest and serve as the operator of the pipeline.

== Project development ==
With the 2015 joint venture, Phase I of the project began with the construction of a 30-inch pipeline from Nederland, Texas to Lake Charles, Louisiana. In April 2016, this pipeline went into service.

Information meetings for the second phase of the BBP were held in January 2017, and manufacture of the pipes began in May 2017. Construction was expected to be completed in early 2018. The project met with opposition quickly; by August 2017 several organizations had filed a lawsuit against the project and requested that the Army Corps provide an Environmental Impact Statement.

Permitting for the pipeline was granted in December 2017, and construction began a few months later.

The pipeline was completed and transported its first oil in April 2019.

== Concerns ==
Communities directly affected by the Bayou Bridge Pipeline (BBP) have expressed broad concerns about the interconnected threats of human health, environmental pollution, and impact on the fishing industry. They have also voiced distrust toward the oil industry in general and Energy Transfer Partners (ETP) in particular.

An early concern voiced by opponents to the pipeline was the lack of an escape route for area residents in the event of emergencies. They also expressed frustration about the iniquity of people from the "brownest, poorest part of Louisiana" bearing the burden of a project whose profits they will not share, i.e. environmental justice. The region affected by the BBP has suffered from extreme pollution resulting from industrial projects and is part of Cancer Alley. The region's fisheries also suffered losses from a 160,000 gallon oil spill by Energy Transfer Partners into Caddo Lake in 2014 and the BP Deepwater Horizon oil spill in 2010. People in the region also became sick when Exxon dumped hazardous oilfield waste in the area during the 1990s.

Between 2010 and 2016, Energy Transfer Partners spilled crude oil more often than any of its competitors with 200 leaks. In May 2017, Energy transfer pipelines in Ohio had a series of leaks. On December 1, 2017 it was reported that a pipeline leaked oil into Louisiana marsh. At a meeting of the St. Martin Parish Council the Louisiana Crawfish Producers Association-West noted that many pipelines and their spill banks underneath the Atchafalaya Basin running east to west have changed the water flow to such a degree that it no longer flows throughout the Basin, creating "dead water" or low-oxygen swamp water. The Corps of Engineers has required pipeline companies to maintain water flow, but is not enforcing the requirement.

In 2017, concerns about the pipeline's contributions to climate change and social justice issues attracted protestors from outside the region to join the L'eau Est La Vie camp in direct action to obstruct construction of the pipeline.

As Energy Transfer's militaristic tactics of dealing with protest at its Dakota Access pipeline became public, such as the employment of security companies for aerial surveillance, radio eavesdropping and infiltration of camps as counterterrorism measures, culminating in the attempt to build a conspiracy lawsuit, it demonstrated how it could scare protestors from further activism.

== Protests ==
In June 2017, the pastor of St. James led a lawsuit opposing the pipeline to protect the community.

In August 2017, St James residents asked the parish council to reject a land use permit for the pipeline. Although the St James Parish council delayed its vote for the permit, it was eventually approved by a margin of 4-3 along racial lines, with the white majority prevailing.

Protesters had demanded an environmental impact statement since at least September 2017. On Halloween, people went to the Louisiana Capitol demanding that Governor John Bel Edwards should require an environmental impact statement for the pipeline. In November, resistance was increasing and opponents of the project filed petition to intervene in a hearing of the Louisiana State Board of Private Security Examiners regarding the application of private security firm TigerSwan, hired by Energy Transfer Partners.

In December 2017, as Bayou Bridge LLC was to expropriate property, environmental activists demanded to see project records, including internal company communications, per Louisiana's public records law.

=== L'eau Est La Vie camp, 2017-2019 ===
In June 2017, water protectors set up a prayer and resistance camp under indigenous leadership called 'L’eau Est La Vie' (Water Is Life). By the end of that year, water protectors had purchased land in Rayne, Louisiana in the path of the BBP from which to stage resistance to the pipeline.

In October 2018, water protectors shut down ETP shareholder meetings, forcing evacuations, and also locked themselves to the gates at the entrance to the residence of ETP CEO Kelcy Warren. Tensions between L'eau Est La Vie camp and ETP security teams escalated, and water protectors reported that ETP security used the wake from a large boat to swamp and sink their vessels while they were legally observing a BBP construction site. Cherri Foytlin, a leader of the water protector camp, reported a brick thrown through her window, her cat being poisoned, and being brutally beaten by two masked men outside her home.

Water protectors continued resistance through direct action including kayak blockades of construction sites, people chaining themselves to excavators, and aerial blockades. By spring of 2019, water protectors had delayed construction by over 100 days and cost millions of dollars in delays through direct action. Several water protectors were charged with felonies under Louisiana's critical infrastructure laws, but the felonies were later reduced.

L'eau Est La Vie camp received funding from Greenpeace, the Rainforest Action Network, and the BEAI fund as well as grassroots donations.

== See also ==
- Stop Line 3 protests
- Dakota Access Pipeline protests
- Water protectors
