= Tara Houska =

First Nations tribal attorney and activist

- Zhaabowekwe
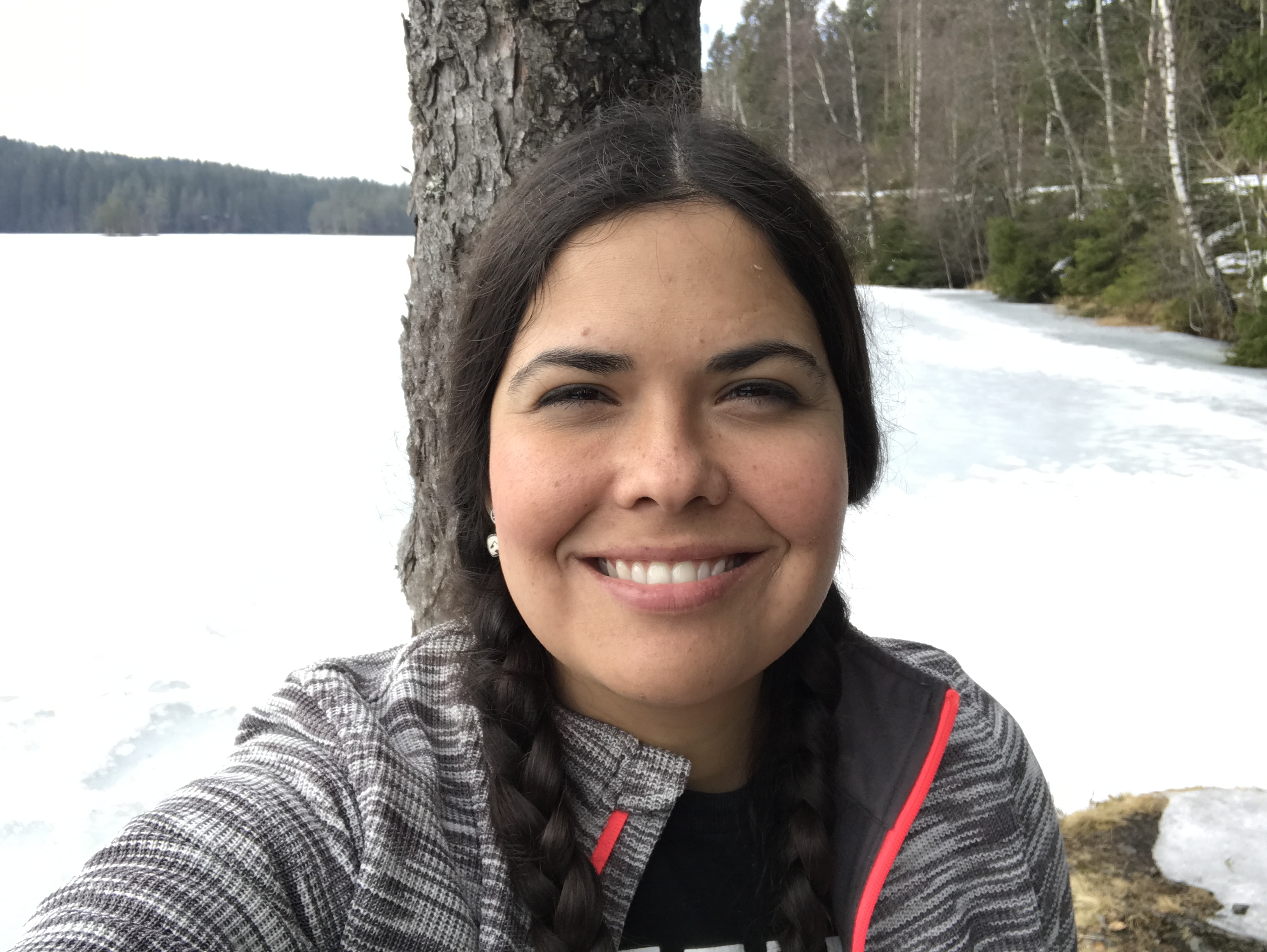
- Tara Houska in 2017
- Born: International Falls, Minnesota
- Citizenship: Couchiching First Nation • American
- Organization(s): Not Your Mascot; Giniw Collective
- Known for: Environmental activism, indigenous activism

Tara Houska Zhaabowekwe (Couchiching First Nation) is a tribal attorney, land defender and climate justice activist.

== Biography ==
=== Early life and education ===
Houska was born in International Falls, Minnesota. She grew up in Ranier, Minnesota, where Rainy Lake connects to Rainy River. Ranier is across the border of Ontario's legal reserve for the Couchiching First Nation community. Houska graduated from Falls High School and earned a Bachelor's degree from the University of Minnesota, where she was a first-generation college student. She earned a law degree from the University of Minnesota Law School, graduating magna cum laude, while learning the Anishinaabe language. She then moved to Washington, D.C., where she worked for a private firm representing tribes around the country.

== Activism ==
=== Not Your Mascots ===
Houska co-founded Not Your Mascots, an organization and social media campaign that educates the public about stereotyping and representation of Native Americans, including work on getting Washington, D.C.'s football team to change its name.

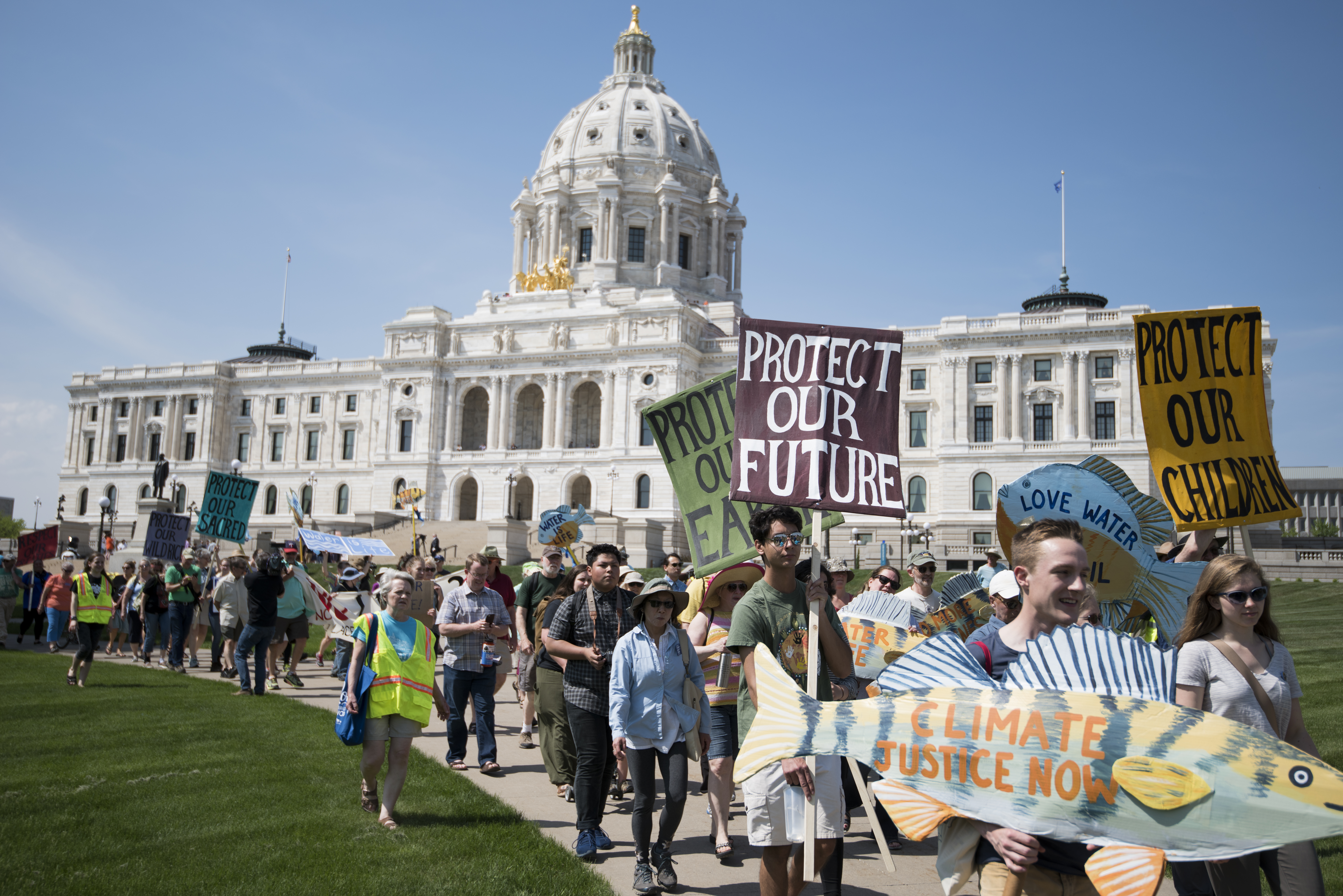
Protesters of the Line 3 Pipeline at the Minnesota State Capital.

=== Pipeline protests ===
Houska founded and runs the Giniw Collective. She and others from the collective fought for seven years against construction of the Line 3 pipeline, an oil pipeline running from Alberta to Wisconsin. Three of those years she spent living in a tent on the pipeline's route, including during harsh winters. The area's tribal nations maintain the treaty rights to hunt, fish, and gather on land along the pipeline, which crosses many bodies of water. Tribal nations also grow wild rice there, which has cultural and historic importance. The Giniw Collective often uses their bodies to stop or slow construction as a form of protest, including crawling inside the pipeline, squatting in trees, and tying themselves to machines. Houska has also engaged politicians directly, including meetings with the Biden administration to push for the federal government to intervene and suspend the project's permit. Minnesota Now called her "one of the leaders in the movement to stop the construction of new pipelines".

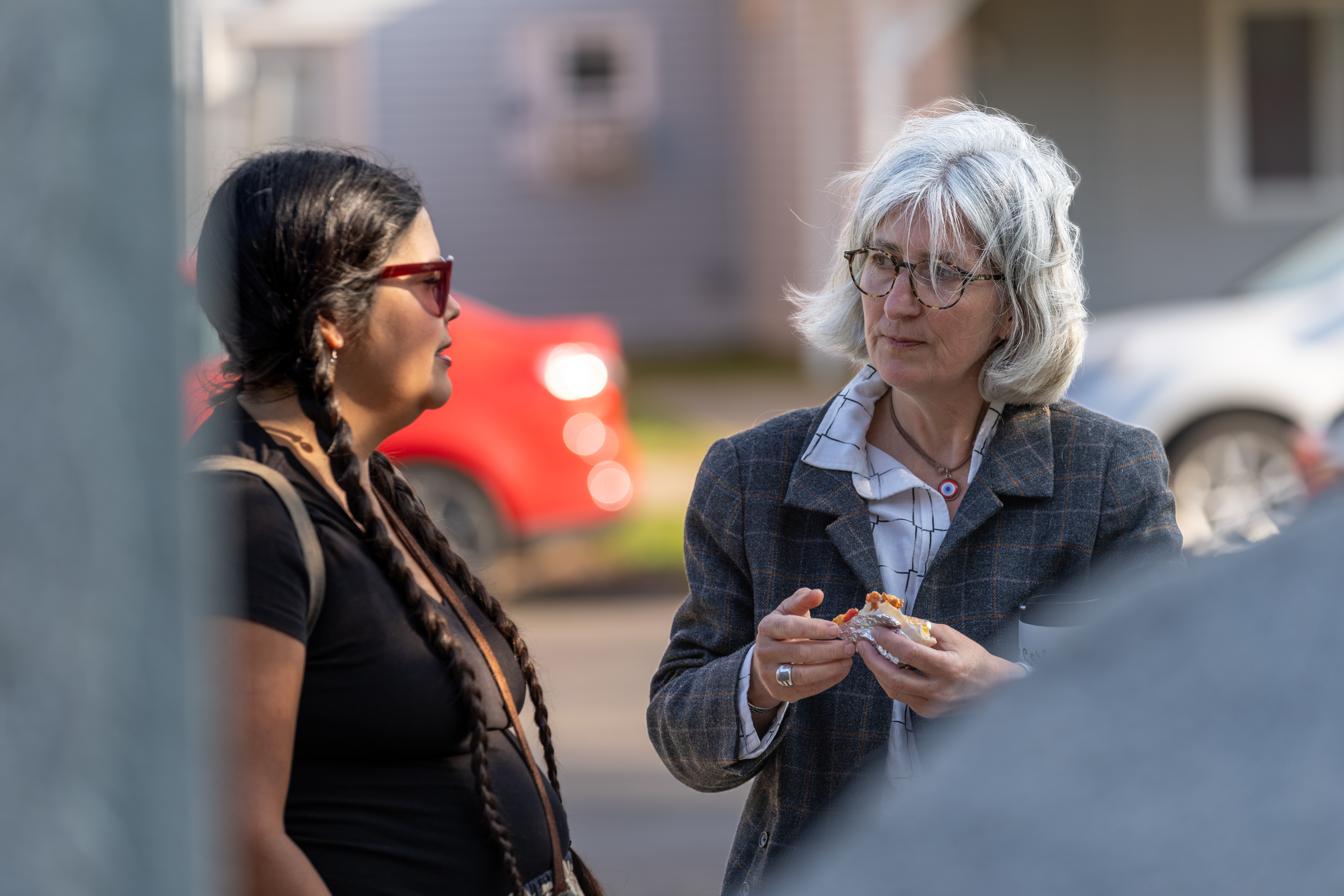
Tara Houska speaking with Mylene Vialard, a U.S. protester for the Line 3 pipeline who was arrested in 2021.

Houska also fought against the Dakota Access Pipeline in 2016 and lived in the Standing Rock encampment for six months.

=== Land Back ===
Houska's work includes reclamation of land for Native stewardship and cultural education. She led the effort to acquire "Bald Rock Point", a historic camp with half a mile of shoreline in her treaty territory on Rainy Lake. Bald Rock Point sits across from the "Review Islands", former home of environmentalist Ernest Oberholtzer. Oberholtzer stored many of his papers and belongings at Bald Rock Point early in its history.

=== Other work ===
Houska is involved in other climate and social justice efforts, having published essays in All We Can Save, Vogue, the New York Times, and CNN. In 2024, she published a chapter on movement lessons learned in the Oxford Handbook on Peaceful Assembly. She is also a contributing writer for the Indian Country Media Network. She was the campaign director for Honor the Earth from 2016 to 2019.

Houska is a former adviser to Senator Bernie Sanders as a campaign Native American advisor. During his 2016 presidential campaign, she was the lead author of his Native policy platform.

In 2021, Houska spoke at the 33rd European Green Party Council on climate change and biodiversity.

=== Awards ===
Houska received the 2023 Rose-Walters Prize for Global Environmental Activism at Dickinson College. The prize rewarded her work as a tribal attorney, land defender, and founder of the Giniw Collective.

Houska also received the 2021 American Climate Leadership Award and the 2019 Rachel's Network Catalyst Award.

Melinda Gates awarded Houska the Good Housekeeping 2017 Awesome Women award.

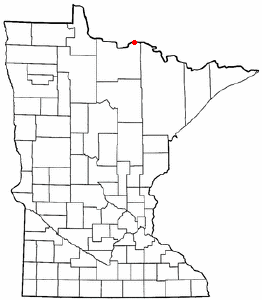
Map showing the pinpoint location of Ranier, Minnesota, the area Houska spent her childhood.

== Personal life ==
In Washington, Houska met Winona LaDuke, and she later worked as a lawyer for LaDuke's environmental advocacy organization Honor the Earth. Since 2019 she has worked for the Giniw Collective and Stop Line 3 protests.
