= Line 3 oil spill =

1.7 million gallon oil spill in Grand Rapids, Minnesota, U.S. in 1991

- Interactive map of Line 3 oil spill
- Location: Grand Rapids, Minnesota and Prairie River, Itasca County
- Coordinates: 47°13′08″N 93°28′43″W
- Date: March 3, 1991

Cause
- Cause: Ruptured pipeline
- Operator: Lakehead Pipeline Company (now Enbridge)

Spill characteristics
- Volume: 1,700,000 US gal (6,400 m^{3})

The Line 3 oil spill was a 1.7 million gallon crude oil spill in Minnesota on March 3, 1991. The Line 3 pipeline, then owned by the Lakehead Pipeline Company (now Enbridge), ruptured on a wetland near Grand Rapids, Minnesota, spilling oil into the Prairie River, a tributary of the Mississippi River. It was the largest inland oil spill in the history of the United States.

Pipeline company operators based in Edmonton waited over an hour to shut down the line after noticing a drop in pressure. Another two hours passed before the pipeline's valves were shut off. As the river was still iced over at the time of the incident, contamination of downstream municipal water facilities was avoided. The Line 3 pipeline was also the origin of a 1.3 million gallon oil spill in Argyle in 1973, the second worst in Minnesota history.

== Background ==
The Line 3 pipeline was built by the Lakehead Pipeline Company (now Enbridge) in the 1960s. The 34" wide, 1031-mile pipeline transports crude oil from Hardisty, Alberta to Superior, Wisconsin. The pipeline was not tested for flaws in its entirety until after 1976.

From the 1970s until the 1991 spill, the Line 3 pipeline suffered 24 leaks due to the same seam failure and was the source of 16 "large oil spills" resulting in four million gallons of oil spilled. Officials with the Minnesota Pollution Control Agency estimated that a total of 5.7 million gallons had spilled from the Lakehead line since 1971. The Line 3 pipeline was also responsible for the second worst oil spill in Minnesota history, when 1.3 million gallons of crude spilled near Argyle, Minnesota in 1973. At the time of the 1991 spill, the pipeline carried 22 million gallons of oil every day.

== Incident ==
On the morning of March 3, 1991, an underground section of the Line 3 pipeline ruptured on a 16-acre wetland owned by Harry Hutchins. Following the rupture, a geyser of pressurized oil sprayed 30 to 40 feet in the air, coating aspen trees in the area. Within hours oil spread throughout the wetland area and over 340,000 gallons of oil from the spill flowed via a storm drain into the Prairie River, a tributary of the Mississippi River. At the time, the river had sheets of ice that were 18 inches thick, and an eight inch pool of crude oil formed on top of the ice towards the middle of the river. Oil also made its way under the ice. The Mississippi River was just two miles downstream from the spill.

At 12:19 p.m., pipeline company operators in Edmonton, Alberta, noticed a massive drop in the line's pressure. Initially believing the pipeline's column of oil had become separated, they increased the pressure towards the end of the line. In a violation of company policy, they waited 71 minutes before shutting down the line after the drop in pressure. Two more hours passed before the company shut off valves to isolate the ruptured section of pipeline and prevent more oil from spilling. According to the National Oceanic and Atmospheric Administration, the delay in shutting down the pipeline resulted in a significant increase in the volume of oil that was spilled. Fish were killed where oil entered the water and the spill impacted marshes and vegetation on the riverbank.

In total, 1.7 million gallons of crude spilled from the pipeline. It remains the worst inland oil spill in the history of the United States.

== Cleanup ==
A resident in the Grand Rapids area contacted the fire department after noticing an odor near the river. Around 300 people living within a half mile of the spill were evacuated for their safety.

Half a dozen government agencies responded to the disaster, including the Minnesota Department of Natural Resources, the Minnesota Pollution Control Agency, the Minnesota Department of Emergency Management, the Environmental Protection Agency, and the United States Coast Guard. The pipeline company hired nearly 20 contractors from three states to attempt to clean up the spill. Oil was removed from the icy surface of the river using vacuum trucks. Squeegees were used to push oil across the ice to locations where it could be removed. Cleanup crews also used chainsaws to cut slots in the ice where booms could be used to absorb the oil. Contaminated blocks of ice were sprayed with hot water to wash out the oil.

While the pipeline company initially said that only 630,000 gallons of oil were spilled, they later tripled the estimate and reported that two million gallons of oil-contaminated water and oil had been collected from the site. 29,400 gallons of oil were thought to have leaked into the soil. Much of it was burned after being dug up.

Cleanup of the spill lasted for months. Pipeline representative Denise Hamsher said the company expected to spend $13 million on cleanup. As the Prairie River was still iced over, a larger disaster was averted. Had the oil spill occurred a month later when the ice had melted, hundreds of miles of the Mississippi River could have been affected.

== Aftermath and related spills ==
Following the Line 3 oil spill, the U.S. Army Corps of Engineers conducted a study of spill response management in the Mississippi River upstream of Minneapolis and Saint Paul. The study found that contamination of the river could create serious problems for the cities of St. Cloud and Minneapolis as they would be left without water if their river intakes were closed longer than a day. The study recommended the establishment of a defense network, including monitoring equipment to detect toxic spills and spill response teams for segments of the river.

Grand Rapids was the site of another Enbridge oil spill on February 19, 2004 when the company's Line 2 pipeline was found to have leaked at least 42,000 gallons of crude oil, affecting the area's groundwater.

In 2021, on the 30-year anniversary of the pipeline disaster, people gathered at the Prairie River for a march near the spill site. One protester was arrested and another 70 received citations. As of December 2020, Enbridge is constructing a new, larger pipeline to carry oil from Canada and replace a portion of Line 3.

== See also ==
- Enbridge Pipeline System
- Kalamazoo River oil spill
- List of pipeline accidents in the United States
- Stop Line 3 protests
