= Greg Grey Cloud =

Crow Creek Nation educator, singer and activist

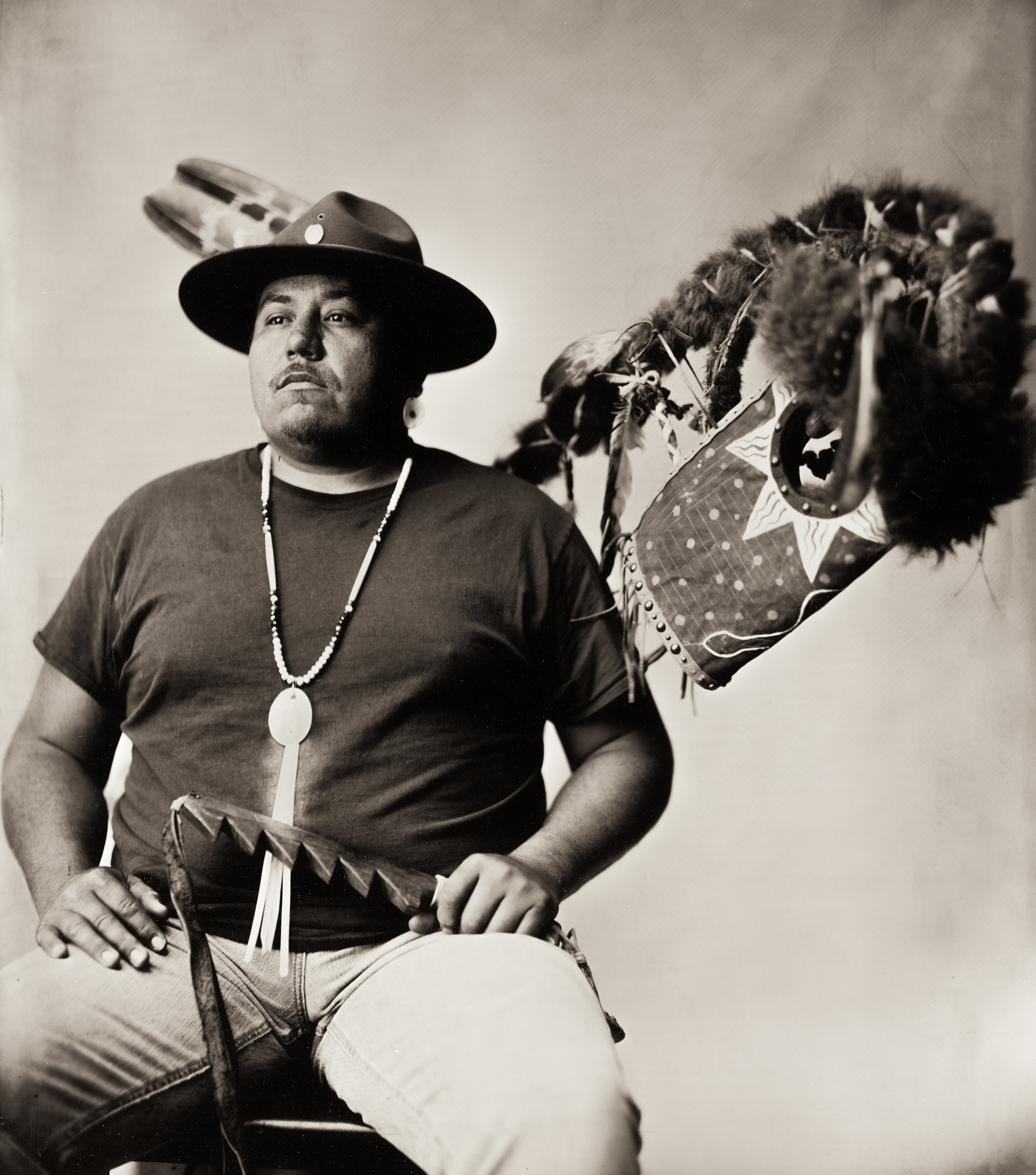
- Grey Cloud in 2021

Greg Grey Cloud is a Crow Creek Nation educator, singer and activist. Grey Cloud is a co-founder of Wica Agli, a non-profit to end violence against women, children, and in general in the community. He is a notable ecologist and defender of Native American rights; gaining national attention when he sang an Honor Song in the Senate after the Keystone XL Pipeline bill was defeated, and in leading the Spirit Riders to protect the Standing Rock Sioux Reservation affected by the construction of the Dakota Access Pipeline.

== Activism ==
On November 18, 2014, Grey Cloud met with Senator Tim Johnson and other lawmakers about the proposed Keystone XL Pipeline. After the narrow vote of 59-41 by senators defeating the measure, Grey Cloud stood and sang a traditional song to honor the senators. Elizabeth Warren, who had the gavel at the time of the decision, called security and had Grey Cloud and the others in the group arrested. Grey Cloud explained: "I wasn't chanting. It wasn't an outburst. It was a song of honor, honoring the senators, the hard work and courage for standing up and saying no to Big Oil." At his appearance in court, all charges were dismissed.

In the fall of 2016, Grey Cloud was on the front line blockade at the Dakota Access Pipeline protests, where Native American water protectors and their supporters were facing Dakota Access Pipeline security, local police, and police who had been brought in from other jurisdictions. Grey Cloud, on horseback in regalia and as part of a small group of people called the Spirit Riders, counted coup on the police.

Medicine men first painted our horses and used medicine carried by Crazy Horse before we dressed the horses. ... We counted coup on the police who were trying to keep the water protectors away. The police moved back and ran away so that the protectors could move forward and protect the land where our ancestors were buried.

Grey Cloud reported that on October 28, several of the Crow Creek horses and riders were chased by police from the Morton County Sheriffs office, riding ATVs, and shot with rubber bullets. The attack resulted in injuries to the riders and two horses, with one horse sustaining such severe and extensive injuries that he fell, and had to be euthanized.

As a visible member of the Dakota Access Pipeline resistance, Grey Cloud was one of the people interviewed about the increasing militarization of the DAPL security forces at Standing Rock, along with surveillance of water protectors, increasing media coverage and the ACLU, among other groups, issuing statements of solidarity with the water protectors.
