= Balsam Creek =

Balsam Creek may refer to:

- Balsam Creek (Prairie River), a river in Minnesota, United States
- Balsam Creek, Ontario, a community in Ontario, Canada
