= Balsam Creek (Prairie River tributary) =

Stream in Itasca County, Minnesota, U.S.

Coordinates: 47°28′52″N 93°20′03″W

Balsam Creek is a stream in Itasca County, in the U.S. state of Minnesota. It is a tributary of the Prairie River.

Balsam Creek was named for the balsam fir trees in its vicinity.

== See also ==
- List of rivers of Minnesota
