= Stop Line 3 protests =

Minnesota protests against expansion of oil pipeline

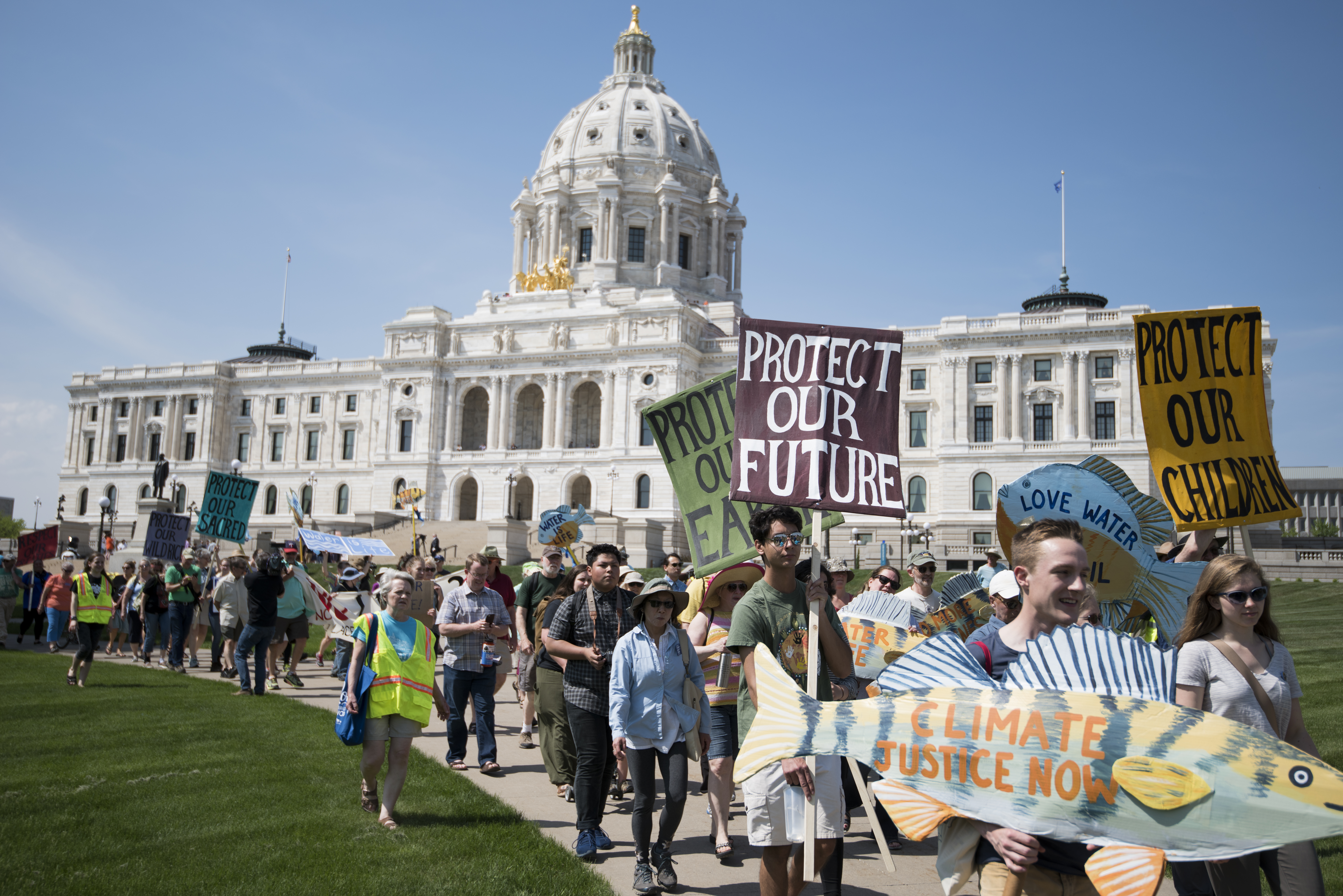
- Stop Line 3 protesters outside the Minnesota State Capitol in 2018
- Date: 2016 – present
- Location: Minnesota, the Mississippi River
- Caused by: Enbridge Line 3
- Goals: Protection of water and climate; Preservation of treaty rights; Revocation of water permits; Cancellation of the pipeline
- Methods: Non-violent direct action, civil disobedience

Parties
| Mille Lacs Band of Ojibwe; White Earth Nation; Red Lake Band of Chippewa; Water protectors; Honor the Earth | Enbridge |

Lead figures
| Winona LaDuke; Tara Houska; Tania Aubid; Great Grandmother Mary Lyons; Dawn Goodwin; Taysha Martineau; Nancy Beaulieu | Al Monaco (Enbridge CEO) |

Casualties
- Arrested: over 773
- Charged: 248

The Stop Line 3 protests are an ongoing series of demonstrations in the U.S. state of Minnesota against the expansion of Enbridge's Line 3 oil pipeline along a new route. The new route was completed in September 2021, and was operational on 1 October 2021. Indigenous people have led the resistance to the construction of the pipeline, which began following the project's approval in November 2020. Opponents of the pipeline expansion, called water protectors, have established ceremonial lodges and resistance camps along the route of the pipeline. Enbridge has funded an escrow account that law enforcement agencies may draw on for pipeline-related police work. Organizers have arranged marches and occupations of Enbridge construction sites. Following the blockade of an Enbridge pump station on June 7, 2021, nearly 250 people were arrested. Invoking treaty rights, organizers established an encampment at the headwaters of the Mississippi River at a site where Enbridge intends to bury the pipeline.

== Background ==
=== Treaty rights ===
Pre-contact map of Anishinaabe lands

The Supremacy Clause of the United States Constitution (Article VI, Clause 2) establishes treaties as the "supreme Law of the Land". Treaties between Anishinaabe bands and the United States government guaranteed certain treaty rights for their members, namely the rights to harvest wild rice, fish, hunt, and gather medicinal plants on ceded lands. These rights were upheld in the U.S. Supreme Court case Minnesota v. Mille Lacs Band of Chippewa Indians.

Both the existing Line 3 pipeline and the proposed expansion cross lands ceded in treaties. In the 1854 Treaty of La Pointe, the Ojibwe Bands of Lake Superior and the Mississippi River ceded lands in the Arrowhead Region while retaining hunting, fishing and gathering rights. In the 1855 Treaty of Washington, two Ojibwa bands ceded land but retained their usufructuary rights. Additional tribal lands were ceded in the 1863 Treaty of Old Crossing, though the rights to hunt, fish and gather were retained.

=== Enbridge and Line 3 ===
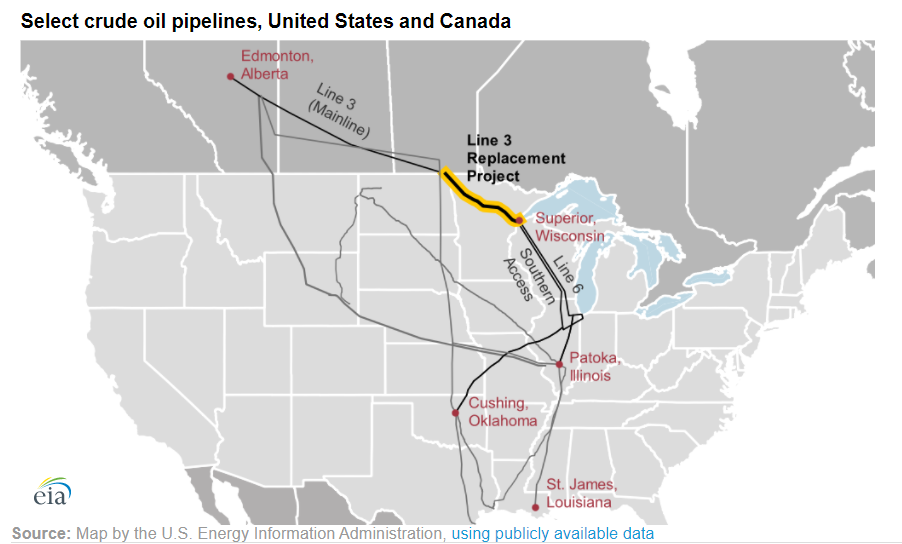
Line 3 replacement project route through Minnesota

Enbridge is a Canadian corporation that maintains vast pipeline networks in the United States. The Enbridge Line 5 pipeline, which was responsible for the 2010 Kalamazoo River oil spill, had its 1953 easement revoked by Michigan Governor Gretchen Whitmer in November 2020 due to concerns over the potential impact of a spill to the Great Lakes.

The Line 3 pipeline was built by the Lakehead Pipeline Company (now Enbridge) in the 1960s. It was the source of the Line 3 oil spill in Grand Rapids, Minnesota, the worst inland oil spill in U.S. history, which spilled 1.7 million gallons of crude into a tributary of the Mississippi River. It was also the source of the second worst oil spill in Minnesota history, when 1.3 million gallons of crude spilled near Argyle, Minnesota.

Deterioration of the existing Line 3 pipeline has resulted in structural deformities that have rendered the pipeline prone to recurring leaks and oil spills. As a preventative measure in 2008, Enbridge halved the capacity of the pipeline to 390,000 barrels per day.

=== Anti-pipeline protests in the 2010s ===
During the 2010s in the United States, grassroots campaigns against proposed pipelines received widespread media attention. An Indigenous-led campaign against the Dakota Access Pipeline centered at the Standing Rock Indian Reservation evolved from a small protest camp to spark an international movement against pipeline projects. Following resistance to the proposed Sandpiper pipeline, which would have passed through Mississippi River headwaters and wild rice habitat in Minnesota, Enbridge cancelled the project, withdrawing its application in 2016.

Following years of opposition to the Keystone XL pipeline, the Biden administration revoked its permit in January 2021.

=== Proposed expansion ===
In 2015, Enbridge announced that it sought to increase the capacity of its pipeline network by rerouting Line 3 through a newly constructed, larger pipeline along a different, existing utility corridor. The new, 36" wide, 340-mile pipeline section is being constructed along a route through the watersheds and ancestral Anishinaabe tribal lands in northern Minnesota, passing between the Leech Lake Indian Reservation, the Red Lake Indian Reservation, and the White Earth Indian Reservation. Enbridge anticipates the completed $7.3 billion pipeline expansion will transport around 760,000 barrels of tar sands oil per day.

== Arguments against the pipeline ==
=== Environmental concerns ===
Principal among the environmental concerns over the pipeline is the possibility of an oil spill. The route of the new pipeline runs through "some of the most pristine woods and wetlands in North America", crossing over 200 bodies of water, including the headwaters of the Mississippi River, lakes, streams, and wetlands. The route proposed by Enbridge passes over 3,400 acres (14 km^{2}) of water in treaty-protected lands that support wild rice habitat.

Tar sands oil, heavier than regular crude, is among the world's most carbon-intensive fossil fuels. Enbridge's environmental impact statement for Line 3 states that the environmental impact of the oil carried by the pipeline will be equivalent to the emissions of 45 coal-fired power stations when burned, with some 200 million tons of greenhouse gases released every year.

=== "Man camps" and sex trafficking ===
In the years before the approval of the project, pipeline opponents raised concerns that increased sex trafficking along the pipeline's new route would add to the crisis of missing and murdered Indigenous women. Minnesotans living in areas where Enbridge is constructing the pipeline expansion have voiced concerns about the effect of "man camps" that house temporary workers. The arrival of highly paid, out-of-state men employed by infrastructure companies such as Enbridge often precipitates rises in crime, particularly prostitution, human trafficking, and drug trafficking. Enbridge denied it was a problem, saying that the company "absolutely rejects the allegation that human trafficking will increase in Minnesota as a result of the Line 3 replacement project."

Two contractors employed by Enbridge were arrested during a sex trafficking sting in Itasca County, Minnesota in February 2021. In March 2021 it was reported that a Thief River Falls nonprofit shelter had been providing services for multiple women who alleged they were assaulted by Enbridge employees. Staff of the shelter also reported instances of their daughters being sexually harassed near an Enbridge camp. Another two Enbridge employees were arrested in a sex trafficking sting in Bemidji in June 2021.

=== Treaty violations ===
Tribal representatives say the pipeline expansion, which passes through treaty-protected lands, is a violation of their tribal sovereignty. The new route for the expanded pipeline runs through watersheds that support traditional wild rice habitat, a food source important to Ojibwe culture.

== Protests ==
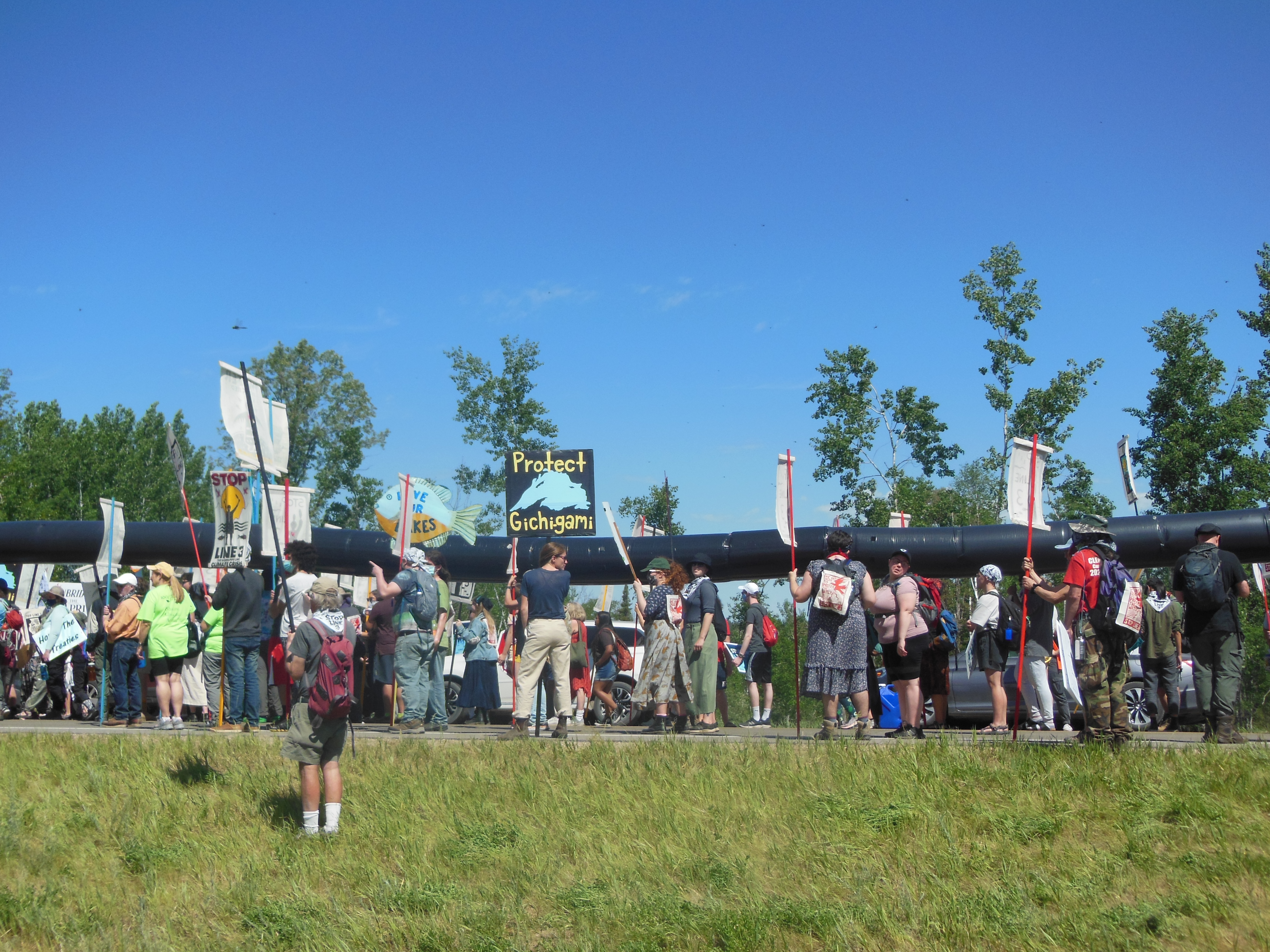
Protesters march toward the headwaters of the Mississippi River, carrying a pipeline

Resistance to the Line 3 pipeline expansion is led by Indigenous women and two-spirit people. Ojibwe-led groups including Giniw Collective, Camp Migizi, Red Lake Treaty Camp, RISE Coalition, and Honor the Earth among others have been at the center of resistance. Demonstrators and protesters organizing in opposition to the pipeline refer to themselves as "water protectors" and follow a campaign of non-violent civil disobedience that includes direct actions. Organizers aim to convince the Biden administration to revoke or suspend the pipeline project's federal clean water permit. Minnesota Governor Tim Walz has not taken a firm stance on the pipeline expansion, which received federal approval under the Trump administration.

Opposition to the pipeline persisted throughout the years-long permit process and continued as legal challenges to the project were mounted. Opponents of the pipeline organized protests, at one point making an encampment outside of the offices of the Minnesota Public Utilities Commission.

After the Minnesota Public Utilities Commission and the U.S. Army Corps of Engineers gave final approval for the project, it was granted a Minnesota Pollution Control Agency construction storm water permit on November 30, 2020. Construction of the pipeline immediately commenced.

=== Resistance camps and demonstrations ===
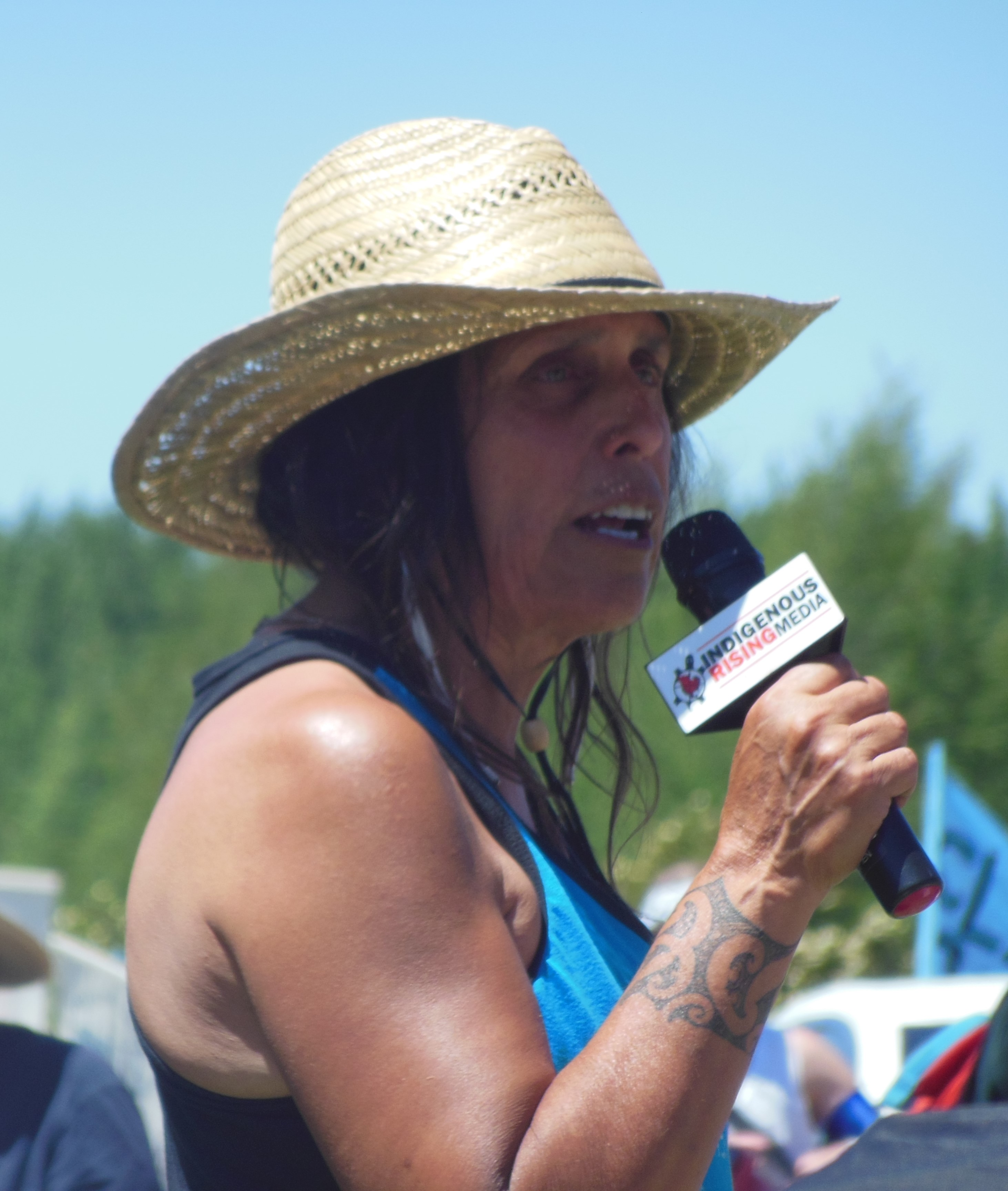
Winona LaDuke speaks near the headwaters of the Mississippi River

Community organizers have established ceremonial lodges and resistance camps along the length of pipeline. Among them is the Welcome Water Protectors Center which serves as an introduction to other camps.

Protesters gathered at one of the first construction sites for the pipeline in Aitkin County, Minnesota on January 9, 2021. Eight people were arrested for trespassing. Weeks after the protest, the Aitkin County Sheriff's Office charged some movement leaders with misdemeanors, using video livestreamed on Facebook as evidence. Those charged included Winona LaDuke, Tara Houska, Shanai Matteson, and Tania Aubid.

Tania Aubid of the Mille Lacs Band of Ojibwe engaged in a hunger strike in March 2021.

The single "No More Pipeline Blues (On This Land Where We Belong)", written by Larry Long, was released on Earth Day in 2021. The track includes vocals from the Indigo Girls, Bonnie Raitt, Mumu Fresh, Pura Fé, and U.S. poet laureate Joy Harjo. A June 2021 concert called Protect the Water featured several musicians performing on a pontoon floating on the Mississippi River including the Indigo Girls as well as singer-songwriters Keith Secola and Annie Humphrey.

==== Giniw Collective ====
Giniw Collective is an Indigenous-women, two-spirit led collective focused on reconnecting to and directly defending the earth founded by Tara Houska in June 2018. The group hosted thousands of water protectors at its camp, called Namewag Camp, located just off the Line 3 route over three years, and provided training in decolonization and non-violent direct action resistance. Tensions with law enforcement reached a breaking point when on June 28, 2021, two weeks after the blockade of the Two Inlets Pump Station located in Hubbard County, Hubbard County Sheriffs attempted to block Giniw Collective and their guests from entering Namewag Camp. The Center For Protest Law and Litigation later won an injunction against the Hubbard County Sheriff for illegally blocking the group's home.

In addition to direct actions, Giniw Collective launched the #DefundLine3 campaign in February 2021, as a founding member of Stop The Money Pipeline Coalition. The collective invited and hosted several members of "the Squad" to Namewag Camp and to meet with tribal leaders in early September to draw awareness to the Line 3 fight, including Representative Ilhan Omar, Representative Rashida Tlaib, Representative Cori Bush, and Representative Ayanna Pressley.

==== Camp Migizi ====
Camp Migizi is a resistance camp against the pipeline founded by Taysha Martineau in Cloquet, Minnesota on the Fond du Lac Indian Reservation. Martineau crowdfunded $30,000 to purchase an acre of land along the planned route of the expanded pipeline. The Fond du Lac Band of Lake Superior Chippewa initially opposed the new pipeline, but ceased their opposition following the approval of the project.

=== Treaty People Gathering ===
Following an invitation from leaders of the opposition to Line 3, around 2000 water protectors gathered for the Treaty People Gathering at the Pure Bliss Ranch on the White Earth Indian Reservation from June 5 to 8, 2021. Attendees learned about treaty rights, non-violent direct action, and attended prayer gatherings and drum circles. The gathering culminated in two separate Indigenous-led direct actions against the pipeline on June 7, a march to the headwaters of the Mississippi River and the blockade of an Enbridge pump station.

=== Mississippi River headwaters action ===
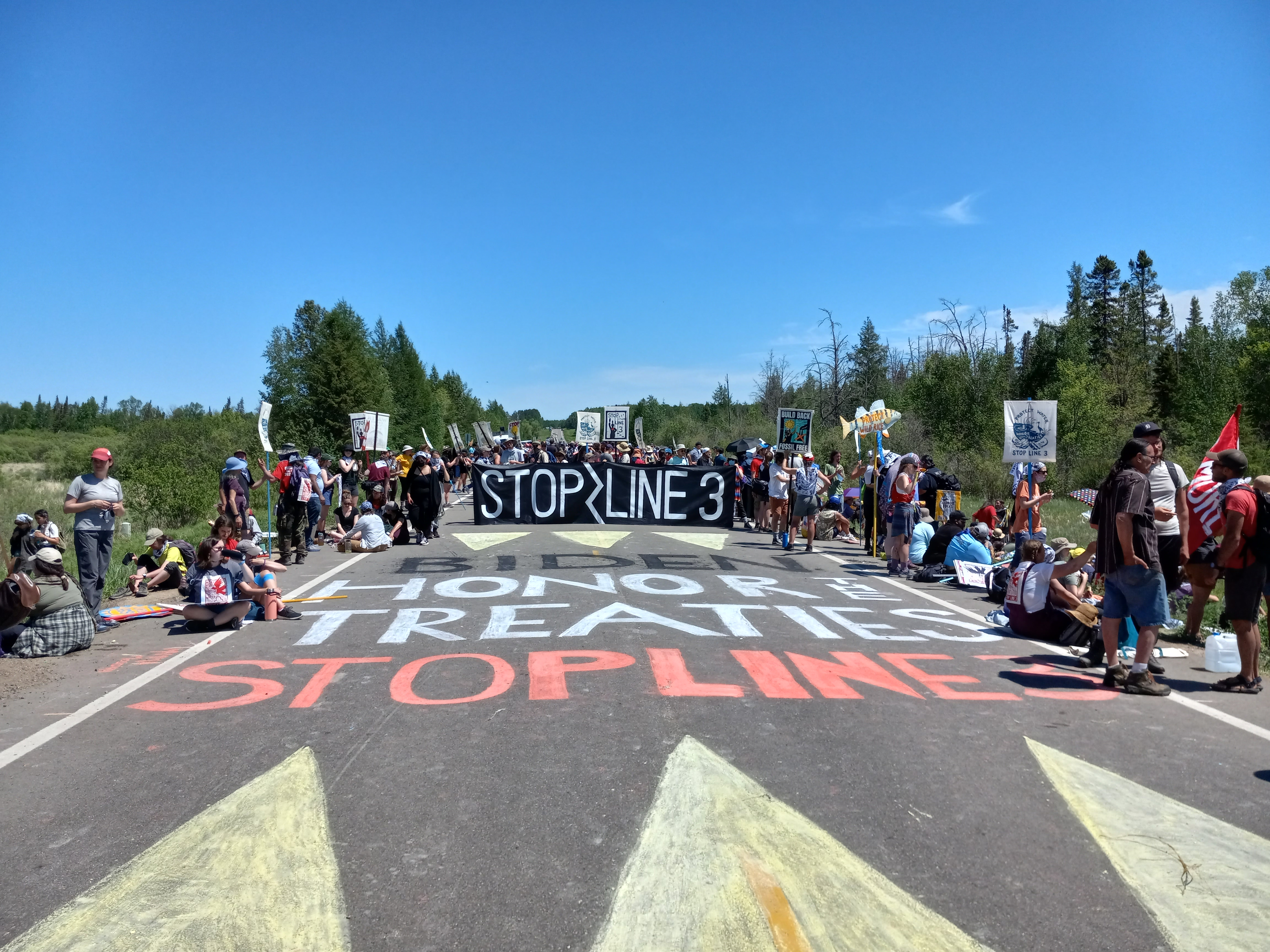
Following a march to the headwaters of the Mississippi River on June 7, 2021, protesters chalked messages on a bridge near a Line 3 construction site

Following an interfaith prayer gathering at LaSalle Lake the morning of June 7, over 1,000 people marched along County Highway 40 to the headwaters of the Mississippi River near a planned crossing of the pipeline. Speakers at the event included Winona LaDuke, actress and activist Jane Fonda, and climate change activist Bill McKibben. Resilient Indigenous Sisters Engaging (RISE) Coalition co-founders Dawn Goodwin and Nancy Beaulieu were also among those to speak. Dakota and Diné elder Tom B.K. Goldtooth guided those who had gathered to the river. Protesters chalked the highway with a message asking President Biden to honor treaties and stop the pipeline. Pipe and water ceremonies were held before elders walked across river marshes to the Enbridge construction site.

==== Fire Light Camp ====
The Fire Light Camp was established on June 7 by tribal members and protesters at the site where Enbridge plans to bury its pipeline underneath the headwaters of the Mississippi River. As a multi-day prayer commenced, over 100 people set up camp, pitching tents along an Enbridge matting platform positioned over the river. Enbridge sent a letter to the Clearwater County Sheriff on June 12, 2021, saying that the people there were trespassing.

=== Two Inlets pumping station blockade ===
On the morning of June 7, 2021, protesters scaled metal fencing to enter an Enbridge pump station about 20 miles north of Park Rapids, Minnesota off of Highway 71. In a non-violent direct action, dubbed "peanut butter" by the activists, hundreds of protesters dug trenches and set up blockades with trees and poles along the pump station's access road while about two dozen people chained themselves to the bulldozers and other heavy machinery at the site. Multiple blockade devices made from steel cable and bamboo were placed along the road. An old fishing boat used to block the entrance to the site bore the name "Good Trouble", after the expression used by the late civil rights leader John Lewis.

Attendees of the pump station blockade included Tara Houska as well as actors Jane Fonda, Taylor Schilling, Rosanna Arquette and Catherine Keener.

==== Rotor washing incident ====
During the occupation of the pump station, protesters were "rotor washed" by a Customs and Border Protection helicopter after local law enforcement called for its assistance. While the Northern Lights Task Force maintained that the helicopter was there to issue a dispersal warning and that the rotor washing was unintentional, video taken by an MPR News reporter showed the helicopter repeatedly performing a maneuver where it hovered about 20 feet off the ground for extended periods, while the wash from its rotor kicked up clouds of dust and debris towards the crowd and the people chained up on the ground. After a clip of the incident went viral, the CBP released a statement saying that there would be an investigation into the actions of the helicopter team.

==== Arrests and charges ====
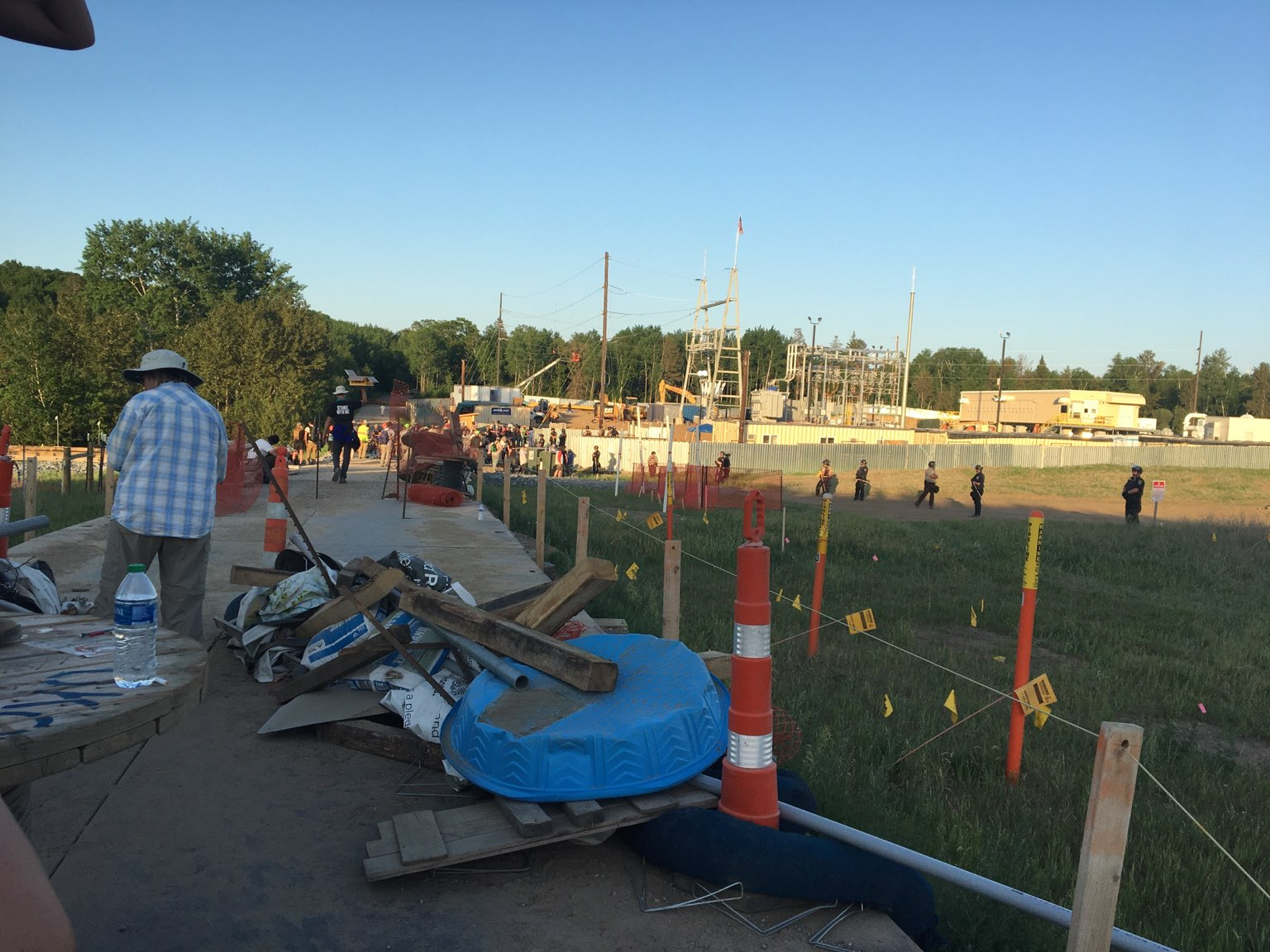
After the road to the Two Inlets pump station was barricaded by protesters, police officers formed a line to protect the Enbridge equipment.

Following the rotor washing incident, police officers clad in riot gear arrived at the site. Dozens were arrested as police deployed a Long Range Acoustic Device (LRAD), a sonic weapon. By the next morning over 100 protesters were thought to have been arrested. Ultimately, 247 people were arrested. 68 were released after receiving citations for unlawful assembly and public nuisance while another 179 were charged with trespassing, a gross misdemeanor, and taken in buses and vans to various county jails. Hubbard County Sheriff Cory Aukes announced that arrestees would be transferred to other counties, as there was not enough room in the county jail to hold them all. Los Angeles Times journalist Alan Weisman was arrested, strip-searched, and had his equipment confiscated while he was detained for hours by the Hubbard County Sheriff's Department.

=== Bank protests ===
Opponents of Line 3 have pressured banks who are financing the pipeline expansion to cut ties with Enbridge. Banks funding the pipeline include JPMorgan Chase, Bank of America, Wells Fargo, Citigroup, the Royal Bank of Canada, and Toronto-Dominion Bank.

=== State capitol protests ===
About 1,000 protesters held three days of demonstrations at the Minnesota State Capitol beginning on August 25, 2021, where the building had been surrounded by security fencing. Protesters called on Minnesota Governor Tim Walz and U.S. President Joe Biden to revoke permits and end the pipeline project. Volunteers erected several teepees on the capitol grounds, which Minnesota State Patrol officers had them remove when the protest permit expired on August 27, resulting in a stand off with law enforcement. Four people were arrested for obstruction.

On August 28, 2021, protesters of the Line 3 oil pipeline marched peacefully from the Minnesota State Capitol building to outside the Minnesota Governor's Residence to advocated for treaty rights and sovereignty of Indigenous lands. At the governor's residence, several people chained themselves to a fence and gate, and officials issued a dispersal order and several people declined to leave the area. In response, Minnesota State Patrol officers arrested and charged 69 people for disorderly conduct, riot, and threats of violence.

=== DC protests ===
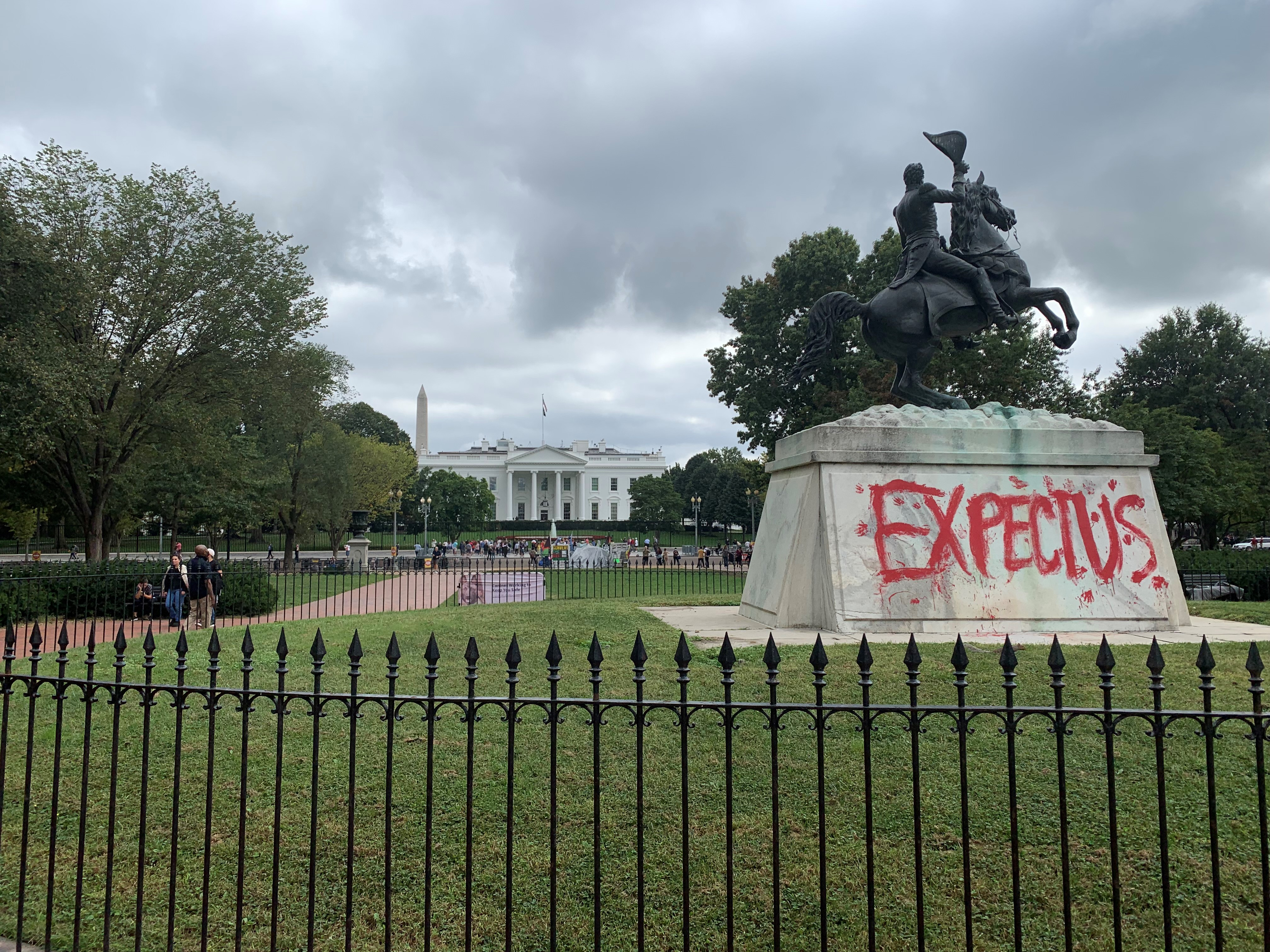
Vandalism of Jackson Monument

The Equestrian statue of Andrew Jackson in Lafayette Square just to the north of the White House was vandalized with the words "Expect Us" on Indigenous Peoples' Day (also Columbus Day), Monday, October 11, 2021. Protestors had been chanting "respect us or expect us" in response to protesting the Line 3 pipeline in Minnesota that runs through lands owned by Indigenous tribes who are concerned that the pipeline could spill and ruin the land they use to farm.

== Enbridge response ==
=== Funding of police activities ===
The Northern Lights Task Force, an interagency law enforcement coalition, was established following state approval of the Line 3 expansion. The task force is funded by Enbridge and includes multiple law enforcement agencies, including Sheriff's departments from counties along the route of the pipeline. Enbridge established an escrow account in May 2020 that allows law enforcement agencies to draw funds for policing costs related to the pipeline. As of March 2022, the escrow account has dispensed over $7.7 million to Minnesota law enforcement agencies, including $2.2 million to Minnesota's Department of Natural Resources. The Cass County Sheriff's Office alone drew over $327,000 of funding for policing costs by April 2021. Center for Protest Law and Litigation lawyer Mara Verheyden-Hilliard criticized the account, saying it incentivizes law enforcement "to take action against peaceful opponents of the pipeline". Protesters have reported aerial surveillance by drones and being tailed by law enforcement in vehicles. Prior to booking arrestees, Hubbard County Sheriff Cory Aukes handcuffs people inside of dog kennel-like cages in his facility's garage bays.

Law enforcement personnel prepared for demonstrations for months. Officers from 12 counties converged at Camp Ripley in September 2020 for a 12-hour training scenario called Operation River Crossing. Following the final approval of the pipeline in November 2020, the task force established the Northeast Emergency Operations Center, a regional headquarters for law enforcement response. From the beginning of construction in December 2020 until June 2021, the task force made over 70 arrests.

Aitkin County Sheriff Daniel Guida and county officials have monitored the social media posts of Stop Line 3 protesters. Guida has posted tables of protest events on Facebook, including details of several pipeline protests with locations, their hosts, and estimates of the number of attendees.

=== Statements ===
Following protests in June 2021, Enbridge spokesperson Michael Barnes compared the blockade of the pump station to the January 6 insurrection at the U.S. Capitol. He said that the pipeline expansion had been 60% completed and that the protests had not had a major impact on construction. Enbridge CEO Al Monaco has said that the pipeline expansion is scheduled to be completed by the end of 2021. According to Enbridge, as of June 2021, around 4000 workers are constructing the pipeline at five different project areas in Minnesota.

== See also ==
- 2020 Canadian pipeline and railway protests
- Valve Turners
- Wisconsin Walleye War
