= Louisiana State Board of Private Security Examiners =

The Louisiana State Board of Private Security Examiners is a state government agency that oversees private security companies operating in Louisiana.

== Jurisdiction ==
In Louisiana, security companies are required to be licensed by the board. The board regulates a wide range of requirements for security companies, ranging from training and uniform standards to insurance and bonding benchmarks.

The board's jurisdiction comes from state law: L.R.S. 37:3270 through 3299, Private Contract Security Companies and Rules. The legal jurisdiction, requirements, and rules of the board and its applicants is derived from Title 46: PROFESSIONAL AND OCCUPATIONAL STANDARDS, Part LIX: Private Security Examiners.

The purpose of the laws regulating private security contractors, according to the state legislature, is to "require qualifying criteria in a professional field in which unqualified individuals may injure the public. The requirements of this Chapter [of the law] will contribute to the safety, health, and welfare of the people of Louisiana."

In order for a person to be eligible for a license from the board to operate a private security company within Louisiana, the person must have at least three years of consecutive experience as an employee, manager, or owner of a security company, or three years of experience as a law enforcement officer with any federal, state, local, or United States military law enforcement agency.

== Enforcement ==
Up until 2011, former New Orleans Police (NOPD) Assistant Superintendent Marion Defillo developed a lucrative gig at NOPD overseeing film-set details. After his "contentious departure from the department" in 2011, Defillo created a private consulting business. He took most of the film-detail work with him. While he was at the NOPD, he created a policy that made him the sole contact person and coordinator for film sets in New Orleans. In 2007, for example, he earned over $107,000 from film work. The Louisiana State Board of Private Security Examiners opened an investigation in February 2012 following a Times-Picayune article that reported that Defillo's private consulting company, called Crescent City Consulting LLC, was offering security-related services on film sets. The board pulled Defillo's license, but he said he would ignore it.

After Hurricane Katrina in 2005, the Houston Chronicle wrote, "As federal troops and rescuers struggled to get to New Orleans and other ravaged Gulf Coast areas last week, convoys of private security and risk consulting firms, many made up of ex-military and former law enforcement officers, quickly arrived on the scene." Before Hurricane Katrina, Louisiana had around 185 private security companies licensed by the board. Within a short period of time after the hurricane, 33 more companies had registered.

== Board appointments and requirements ==
The Louisiana State Board of Private Security Examiners is an agency of the state government in the Department of Public Safety and Corrections.

The board is made up of nine members appointed by the Louisiana governor. Louisiana law created five public service commission districts within the state, and one member that resides in each of the districts can be appointed. The other four members are appointed at-large in the state. Commissioners must be at least 30 years old and must have worked in the private security business for at least 5 years. American citizenship is also required.

At least one of the at-large board members must be a representative of a "nationally operated security company."

== Fabian Blache ==
In the spring of 2018 the board placed Fabian Blache, the CEO and executive director of the board, and his assistant on paid administrative leave pending an internal investigation related to his efforts to shut down a security company. The security company, Delta Tactical, was accused of "acting like cops." Delta Tactical was hired by bars to patrol their parking lots.

Blache is a former New York Police Department officer and former investigator for the Louisiana Attorney General's office. He was hired as the executive director in 2016. He has said that some of his actions as director have been unpopular because, according to The Advocate, "his goal is to clean up the private security industry, making sure companies are following the rules and displaying an adequate degree of professionalism."

Nick Fetty, the owner of Delta Tactical, filmed a discussion with Blache in December 2017 using a body camera. During the discussion, Blache asserted his authority as the director of the board and issued a warning to Fetty. Blache told Fetty, "You don't run this show." He further threatened Fetty and his company's license to operate in Louisiana, saying, "That's just not cool. Besides the fact it won't be tolerated because I'll just C&D [cease and desist] you Monday and we can end it.

"A secretly recorded video of the Louisiana Board of Private Security Examiner's CEO and Executive Director, Fabian Blache, shows him making it clear who's the boss."

At the end of April 2018, the board voted to take Blache off of administrative leave - "surviving a move to oust him." The vote for giving Blache his job back came down to a 4 to 4 vote, but the chair broke the tie, pushing it to 5 to 4 to give Blache his job back. According to Baton Rouge CBS TV station WAFB, "A fiery, contentious meeting took place Monday morning specifically to address the issue."

== Investigations of the board ==
Blache and his executive assistant, Bridgette Hull, had been on paid administrative leave for a month since March 29. Both have been the subject of a series of WAFB News investigations after some of the board's employees sent an anonymous letter to the board chair, alleging a hostile work environment and saying that morale was at an all-time low. Following the letter, the Equal Employment Opportunity Commission (EEOC) launched an investigation into the state board and looked into 13 complaints of sexual harassment, race discrimination, unprofessional behavior, sexually suggestive gestures, and failure to fill out time sheets and allocate vacation days. The EEOC investigators substantiated some of the complaints while dismissing some the others.

One of the allegations that the EEOC investigated regarded the conduct of Blache and his assistant, Bridgette Hull. "Another allegation by a fellow employee was that when Blache is in his office "Hull will come in and sit on his knee" or "sit on the arm of the chair or desk" and give and receive "back massages." While Blache denies any of that happened, EEOC investigators say "Hull admitted Mr. Blache massaged her neck, she sat on the corner of his desk at meetings, and draped her feet over the side of chair.""

The investigation has led to some groups, such as the Institute for Justice, asking questions about the regulation of workers in Louisiana.

Lee McGrath, the legislative counsel for the Institute for Justice, a "free-market solution" organization, said that "the face that all members of the board are also owners of private security companies is concerning."
