= Line 3 pipeline =

Enbridge Canadian-American oil pipeline

Line 3 Pipeline

Location
- Country: Canada; United States
- Start: Hardisty, Alberta
- To: Superior, Wisconsin

General information
- Type: Crude oil
- Owner: Enbridge
- Commissioned: 1968

Technical information
- Length: 1,659 km (1,031 mi)

Line 3 Replacement (Canada Segment)

Location
- Country: Canada

General information
- Type: Crude oil
- Status: Complete
- Commissioned: December 2019

Technical information
- Website: Canada segment

Line 3 Replacement (U.S. Segment)

Location
- Country: United States

General information
- Type: Crude oil
- Status: Complete
- Construction started: December 2020
- Commissioned: October 2021

Technical information
- Website: U.S. segment

The Line 3 pipeline is an oil pipeline owned by the Canadian multinational pipeline and energy company, Enbridge. Operating since 1968, it runs 1,031 miles (1,659 km) mainly from Hardisty, Alberta, Canada all the way to Superior, Wisconsin, United States.

Concerns about the safety of the pipeline led Enbridge to reduce its capacity. Over its history, the pipeline has been the source of millions of gallons of oil spills, including a 1991 oil spill in Grand Rapids, Minnesota, that was the worst inland oil spill in U.S. history. In 2014 Enbridge proposed the construction of a new pipeline segment along a different route in Minnesota which would increase the volume of oil that could be transported. The replacement pipeline has been completed in Canada, Wisconsin, North Dakota, and Minnesota. Permitting and construction of the new pipeline has been met with resistance from American Indian tribal communities and climate justice groups. Despite protests, the expansion was operational by October 1, 2021.

== History ==
The original Line 3 pipeline began operating in 1968, initially owned by the Lakehead Pipeline Company. The 34" wide, 1031-mile pipeline transports crude oil from Hardisty, Alberta, to Superior, Wisconsin. The pipeline was not tested for flaws in its entirety until after 1976.

=== Oil spills ===
From the 1970s until the 1991 spill, the Line 3 pipeline suffered 24 leaks due to the same seam failure and was the source of 16 "large oil spills" resulting in four million gallons of oil spilled. Officials with the Minnesota Pollution Control Agency estimated that a total of 5.7 million gallons had spilled from the Lakehead line from 1971 to 1992. The Line 3 pipeline was the origin of a 1.3 million gallon oil spill in Argyle in 1973. On March 3, 1991, the Line 3 pipeline ruptured in a wetland near Grand Rapids, Minnesota, spilling 1.7 million gallons of crude oil into the Prairie River, a tributary of the Mississippi River. It was the largest inland oil spill in the history of the United States of America. At the time of the 1991 spill, the pipeline carried 22 million gallons of oil every day.

=== Expansion and new route ===
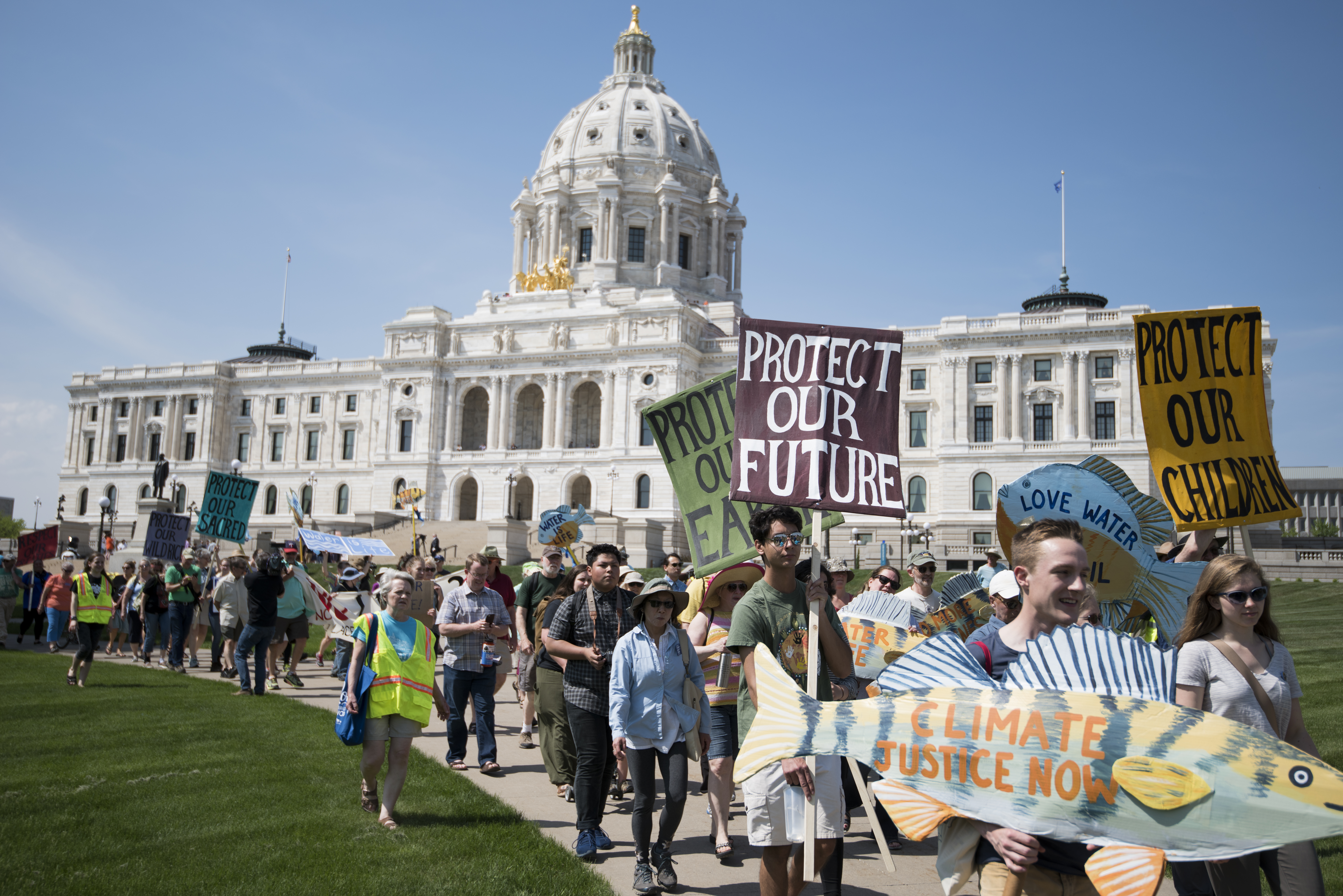
People protesting the Line 3 pipeline at the Minnesota capitol building in 2018.

Structural deformities, including numerous cracks and holes have developed along the pipeline over time. Resulting concerns about the safety of the pipeline have led Enbridge to reduce the amount of oil transported daily. Due to concerns about the aging pipeline's leaks and spills, in 2014, Enbridge announced plans to build a replacement Line 3 pipeline. That multi-billion dollar project would allow Enbridge to restore their historic operating capacity and move nearly 800,000 barrels of oil per day. By 2016, governing bodies in Canada, North Dakota, and Wisconsin had approved their segments of the pipeline. Construction of the new Line 3 was completed everywhere but Minnesota by November 2020.

The permitting process has been more complicated in Minnesota where climate justice organizations, American Indian groups, and government agencies have resisted the project. Enbridge agreed to a new route for the replacement line, avoiding more sensitive watersheds and some Indian reservations. In 2018, the Minnesota Public Utilities Commission (PUC) solicited public input about the project. Of the nearly 70,000 individual comments submitted, 68,244, or 94%, were in opposition. Nevertheless, in June 2018 the PUC approved Enbridge's modified route and granted the Certificate of Need and Route Permit, both necessary for the project.

As of December 2020, Minnesota state and federal regulators had granted Enbridge all of the permits required to construct the last stretch of the Line 3 pipeline through Minnesota. The permits for this project have been consistently contested by Indigenous communities, environmental justice organizations, and the Minnesota Department of Commerce. Although several of the pipeline's main permits were still facing appeals in court, regulatory agencies had granted the remaining permits to Enbridge to begin construction by November 2020.

Enbridge began construction of the new Line 3 oil pipeline across northern Minnesota in December 2020, shortly after final permits were issued. The Biden administration supported the pipeline. However, the pipeline still faced significant resistance until its completion in September 2021. The pipeline expansion became operational on 1 October 2021.

=== Ongoing opposition following final permit approval ===
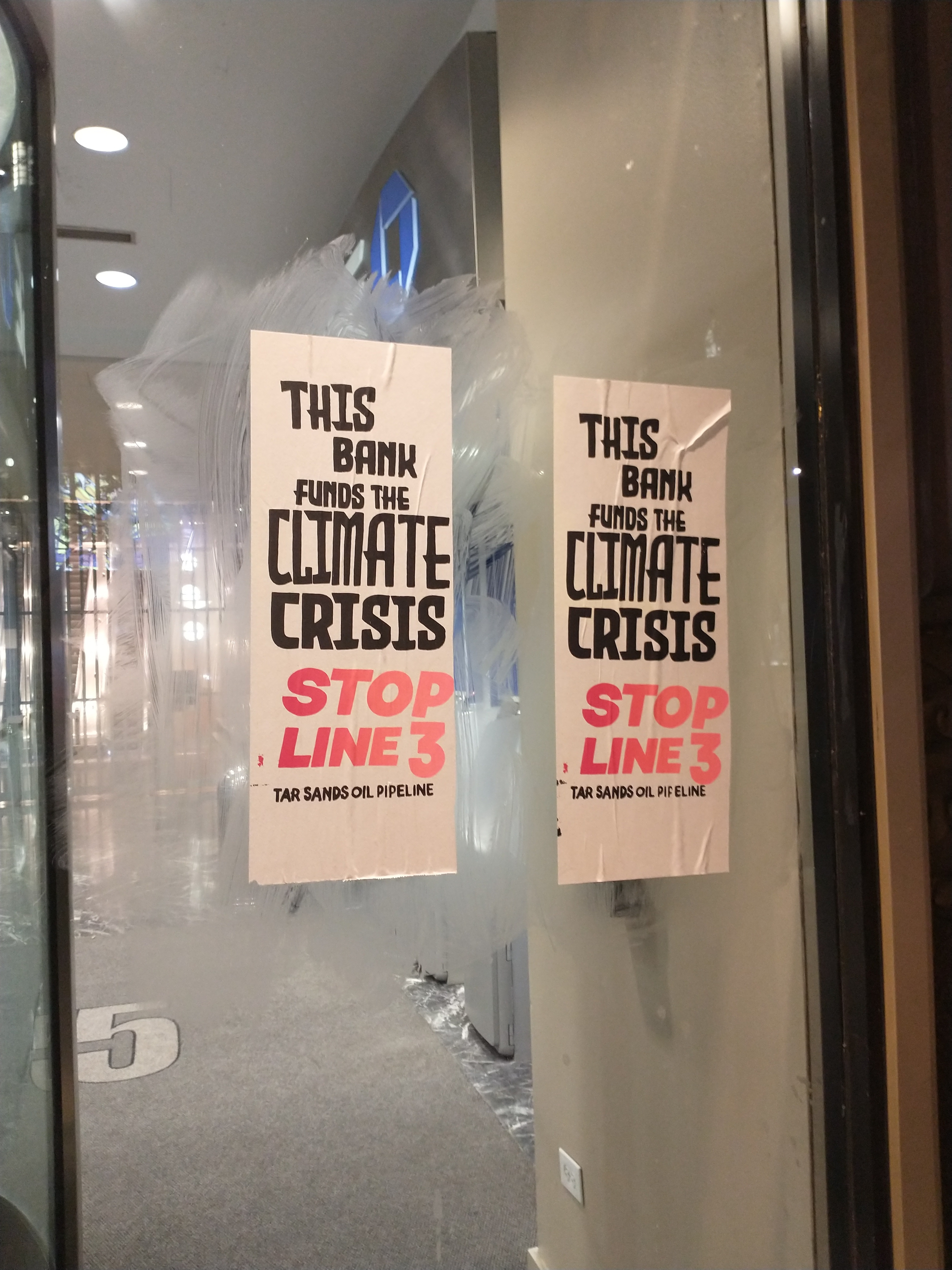
Posters protesting Chase Bank investing in Enbridge's Line 3 pipeline and the climate crisis.

Several parties, including Ojibwe tribes, environmental organizations, and the Minnesota Department of Commerce, are still appealing the project in court. In March 2021, the Minnesota Court of Appeals heard testimony from Enbridge, the PUC, and appealing parties. The plaintiffs brought forth several challenges to the pipeline, most notably questioning whether the energy transfer company had ever proved that there would be enough continued demand for tar sands oil to justify construction of Line 3. A ruling is expected on the appeals in June 2021 which could lead to a revocation of Enbridge's permits for construction.

Outside the courts, American Indian-led groups had organized opposition to Line 3, delaying construction along the pipeline route through non-violent direct action and protest. Groups like the Giniw Collective, Camp Migizi, Honor the Earth, and the RISE Coalition staged dozens of protests attended by thousands of people in the first four months of construction. As of April 2021, more than 200 people had been arrested for protesting along the pipeline route. At the time of the pipeline's completion, nearly 900 people were facing charges related to pipeline resistance in northern Minnesota.

On June 7, 2021, protesters referring to themselves as water protectors organized a gathering at the White Earth Indian Reservation. The gathering, attended by "around 2,500 people", culminated in two direct actions. Over 200 protesters occupied an Enbridge pumping station and barricaded access. Subsequently, police in riot gear began making arrests. 247 people were arrested. 68 were released after receiving citations for unlawful assembly and public nuisance while another 179 were charged with trespassing.

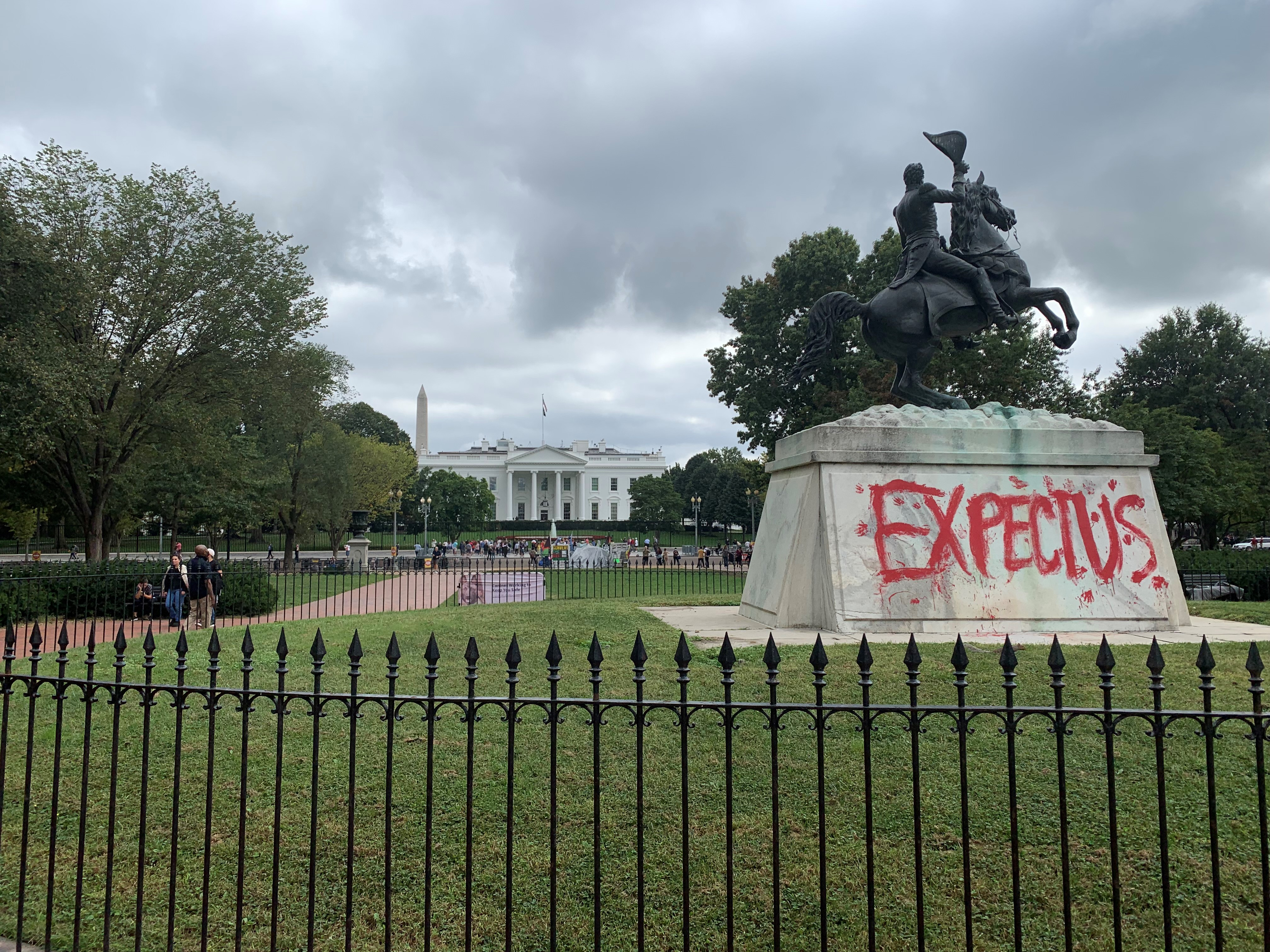
Vandalism of the Jackson Monument, 2021

The Equestrian statue of Andrew Jackson in Lafayette Square just to the northern front of the White House was vandalized with the words "Expect Us" on Columbus Day, on October 11, 2021. Protesters had been chanting "respect us or expect us" in response to protesting the Line 3 pipeline in Minnesota that runs through lands owned by American Indian tribes who were concerned that the pipeline could spill and ruin the land they use to hunt, fish, gather, and farm.

== Debate in Minnesota ==
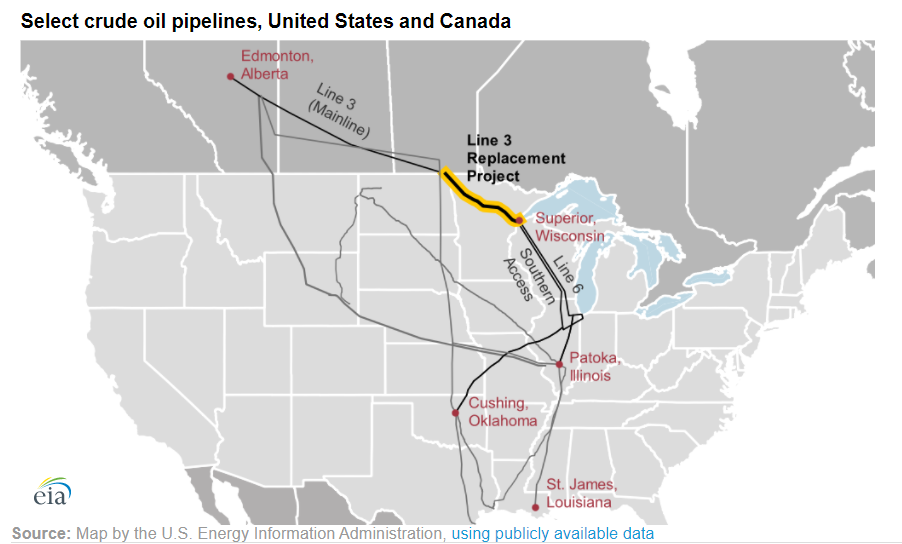
Line 3 replacement project route through Minnesota

=== Opposing arguments ===
==== Climate change ====
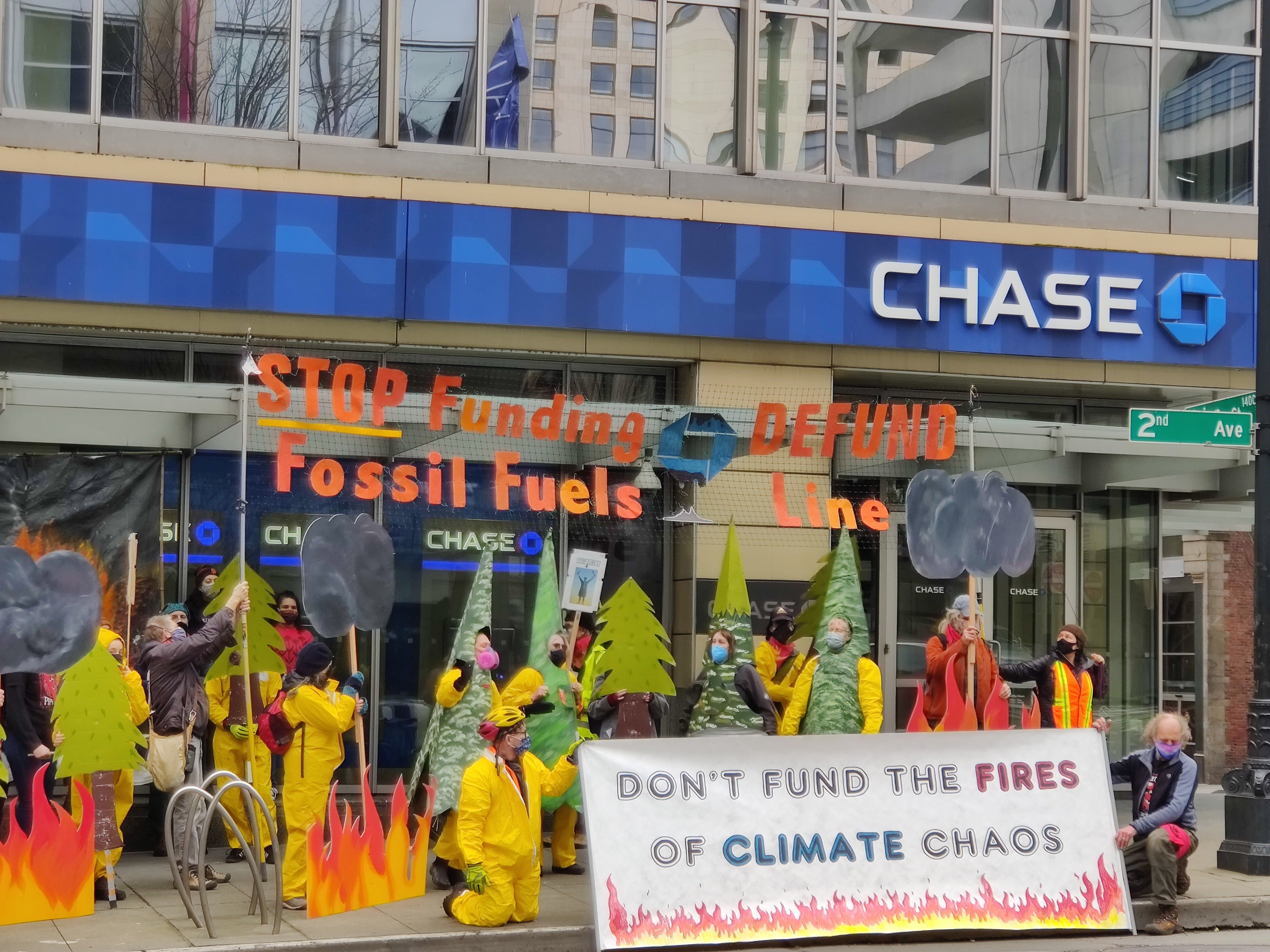
People protesting the Line 3 pipeline with a sign reading "Don't fund the fires of climate chaos" at a Chase Bank branch in Seattle (February 2021).

Much of the resistance to the Line 3 project comes from concerns over climate change. Climate justice groups such as the North Star Chapter of the Sierra Club, MN350, and Honor the Earth have campaigns to "Stop Line 3." The Environmental Impact Statement (EIS), which was conducted by the Minnesota Department of Commerce, explains how the new Line 3 pipeline would contribute to deforestation, increase risk of pollution to Minnesota's pristine water ecosystems and wild rice beds, and generate the greenhouse gasses that contribute to climate change. In fact, a study authored by over a dozen climate justice organizations found that the greenhouse gas emissions from constructing the new Line 3 pipeline would be equivalent to building 50 new coal-fired power plants. The EIS estimated that the social cost of carbon from those emissions would total more than $120 billion over 30 years. The MN Department of Commerce under Governor Mark Dayton formally denounced the proposed Line 3 project on environmental grounds.

In light of the serious risks and effects on the natural and socioeconomic environments of the existing Line 3 and the limited benefit that the existing Line 3 provides to Minnesota refineries, it is reasonable to conclude that Minnesota would be better off if Enbridge proposed to cease operations of the existing Line 3, without any new pipeline being built.

— Minnesota Department of Commerce, The Bemidji Pioneer

=== Tim Walz's administrative U turn ===
Although the appeal was supported twice by Governor Tim Walz's administration, they subsequently withdrew support on 12 November 2020. Four days later 12 out of 17 of the Minnesota Pollution Control Agency's Environmental Justice Advisory Group resigned.

The decision to approve the permit sends a clear message that the Walz Administration and the MPCA hold no regard for the well-being of Minnesotans or our relatives around the world, who depend on us to dramatically, rapidly, and justly transition our economies away from fossil fuels. This is the final straw after increasing disappointment in the MPCA’s failure to build on the hard work of dedicated EJAG members over the years. The transition to a new commissioner has set back the EJAG’s work, and the EJAG has since been excluded from important decisions that affect how the group is managed. EJAG members were not consulted on the hiring of an outside facilitator, nor on the divvying of group members into work groups. EJAG members have also experienced dismissal, being discouraged from sharing honest thoughts and opinions. This is not how an advisory group should be engaged to appropriately respect the wisdom being sought.

— EJAG resignation letter,

In February 2021, U.S. Representative Ilhan Omar called on President Joe Biden to stop the construction of the pipeline: "The decision that U.S. entities make on Line 3 is a decision made for the entire world, and for all coming generations of humanity. I urge you to make the one decision supported by the scientific consensus on climate change: Stop Line 3." A press release cited how the pipeline would "add five times as much greenhouse gas annually as Minnesota transportation produced in total in 2016."

==== Oil spills ====
Many people are concerned about potential oil spills along Line 3. Among other accidental releases, the original Line 3 pipeline was responsible for the largest ever inland oil spill in the U.S. In 1991, 1.7 million gallons of oil ruptured from Line 3 in Grand Rapids, Minnesota. Enbridge was also responsible for the 2010 Kalamazoo River oil spill in Michigan. Cleanup of that spill cost over a billion dollars and took nearly a decade. In total, Enbridge has overseen over 800 oil spills between 1999 and 2010. The resulting pollution has adversely affected the economy, public health, and the environment in Michigan. Enbridge has reassured the public that pipeline safety is their primary goal, and they employ technology to monitor their pipelines and train employees on emergency response. While big oil spills (>238 barrels of oil) have decreased in recent years, activists in Minnesota say that the potential for even one serious spill is too much of a risk. The Environmental Impact Statement of Line 3 acknowledges that some accidental release of oil is inevitable and that serious oil spills are possible.

==== Ojibwe treaty rights ====
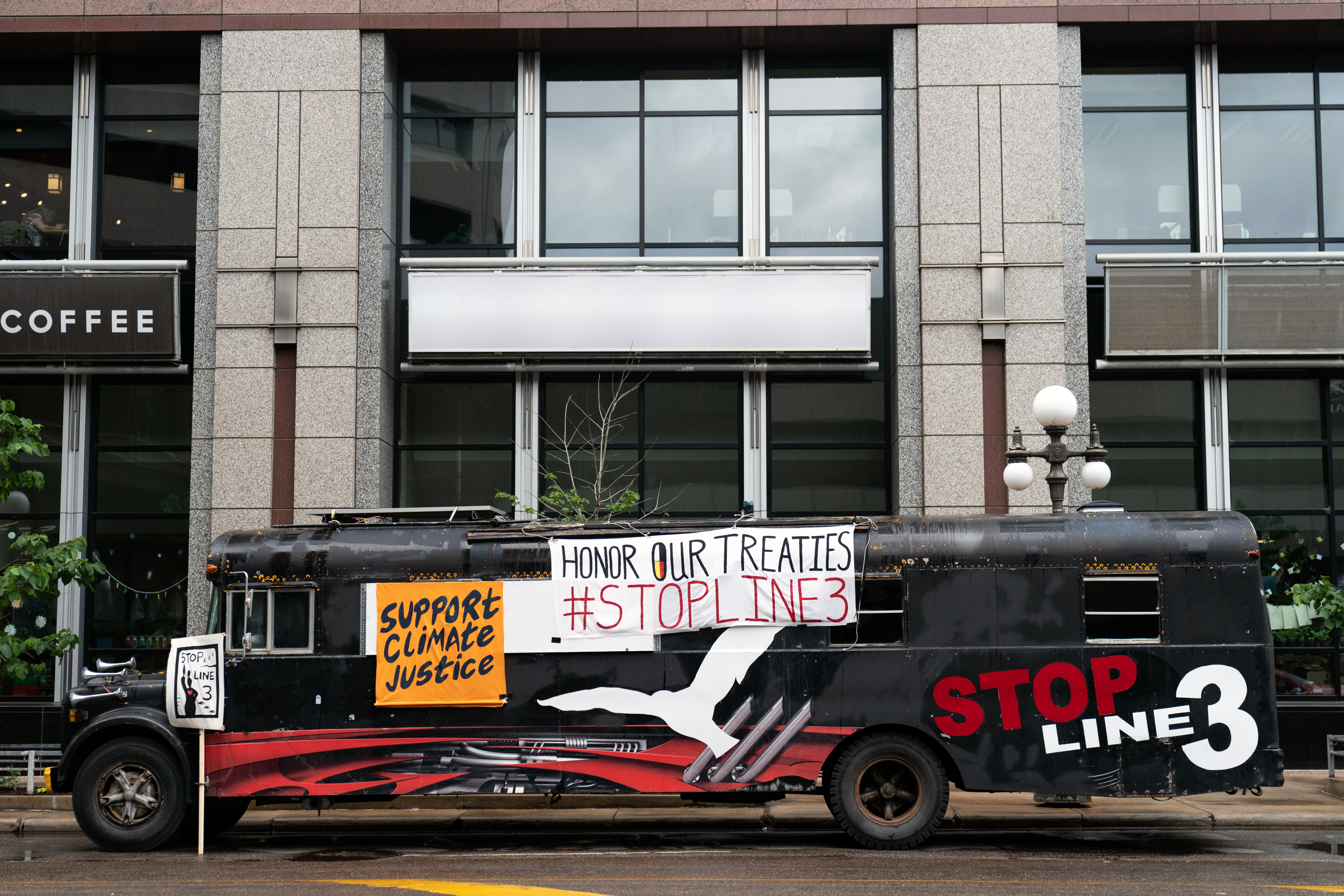
A bus in downtown St. Paul, Minnesota with an "Honor Our Treaties #StopLine3" sign outside the MN Public Utilities Commission hearing on the Line 3 pipeline.

Some American Indian communities in Minnesota have opposed the project on the basis of treaty rights. Most of the land in northern Minnesota was ceded to the U.S. through treaties with Ojibwe peoples throughout the 1800s. Those treaties established reservations, as well as land use rights for Ojibwe people to hunt, fish, and harvest manoomin (wild rice) on the rest of the ceded territory. The proposed route for the new Line 3 pipeline would cross through that protected land. Several Ojibwe communities have said that construction of the pipeline would violate treaty rights by disrupting and threatening the resources promised to them on their ancestral land. The Environmental Impact Statement acknowledges that construction of Line 3 would disrupt Indian historic and cultural sites such as burial grounds. However, a complete Traditional Cultural Properties Survey has not been conducted of the proposed route.

Five Ojibwe bands have resisted the pipeline replacement project in court. The White Earth, Red Lake, Mille Lacs, Fond du Lac, and Leech Lake bands all opposed the pipeline and held status as intervening parties against the project in the PUC's initial permit deliberations. After the PUC's June 2017 approval, the White Earth and Red Lake bands were part of a joint appeal of the Certificate of Need, while the Mille Lacs, White Earth, and Red Lake bands appealed the Environmental Impact Statement. In August 2018, the Fond du Lac band signed a right-of-way agreement with Enbridge, allowing the company to route the pipeline through their reservation. Ahead of that decision, Tribal council chairman Kevin Dupuis Sr., said “as a sovereign nation, we are confounded that we are being forced to choose between two evils as both routes pass through our lands,” either through the reservation or ceded treaty land. The Leech Lake Band also stepped back from formal appeals in December 2018 when Enbridge agreed to remove the old pipeline from their reservation if construction of the new pipeline begins.

==== Drug and sex trafficking ====
American Indian activists and their allies are bringing awareness to the connection between fossil fuel infrastructure projects like Line 3 and increased drug and sex trafficking in and around Native American reservations. While oil pipelines like Line 3 are being built, the construction workers stay in concentrated, temporary housing along the route, often known as “man camps.” The high wages and social isolation in man camps lead to increased drug use, as well as violence perpetrated by employees on the surrounding Native communities. In 2019, American Indian and climate justice activists held a “March on Enbridge to Protect the Sacred,” at the Enbridge terminal in the city of Clearbrook, Minnesota. They demanded an end to the Line 3 project citing, among other things, “the direct link between the fossil fuel industry and Missing and Murdered Indigenous Women and Relatives.” The Environmental Impact Statement on Line 3 acknowledges that connection as well, saying “The addition of a temporary, cash-rich workforce increases the likelihood that sex trafficking or sexual abuse will occur.” Under the EIS, Enbridge was required to prepare a Human Trafficking Prevention Plan for the project. Enbridge's plan has been critiqued, however, as a step made more to follow procedure than a true commitment to ending violence by their employees. Groups of American Indian activists and climate justice organizers maintain opposition to the pipeline over the potential for increased violence and drug trafficking along the proposed pipeline route.

==== Pipeline "abandonment" ====
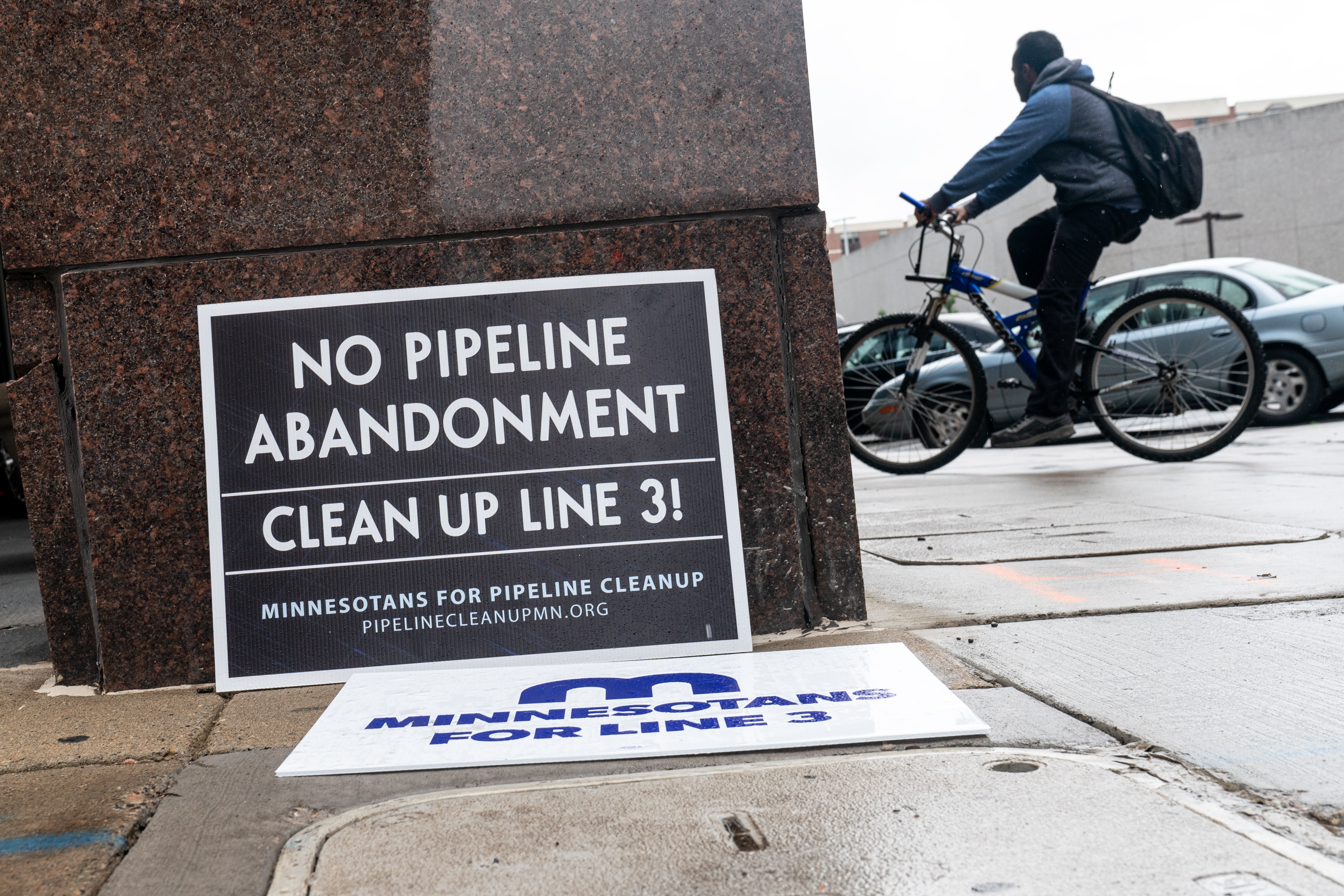
Sign on a street in St. Paul stating "No Pipeline Abandonment. Clean Up Line 3!"

The agreement between Enbridge and the Leech Lake Band centers on another debate about what will happen to the infrastructure of the old Line 3 pipeline if the new one is built. Enbridge proposed a process they call "deactivation." Many who oppose the project call this "abandonment." Enbridge explains deactivation of a pipeline as a 5 step process: remove the oil, clean the pipe, disconnect it from facilities, put corrosion controls in place, and then leave the pipe in the ground. Minnesotans for Pipeline Cleanup, an organization opposed to Line 3, has expressed concerns about the potential for pollutants to remain after the cleanup. Many landowners along the old route worry that they will bear the financial burden for the decommissioned pipe, either through costs of cleanup, removal, or lost property value. Both the Pipeline Abandonment Report from Minnesotans for Pipeline Cleanup and the Chippewa Cumulative Impact Statement, written to supplement the EIS, mention that Line 3 would be the first pipeline ever to be decommissioned in Minnesota, and worry about what sort of precedent that might set.

=== Arguments in support ===
==== Job creation ====
Supporters of Line 3 cite job creation as a key reason to build the pipeline. A large study published by the University of Minnesota Duluth in 2017 claimed that the Line 3 Replacement Project would create thousands of jobs. However, later that year, investigative journalists uncovered that a business group funded by Enbridge, APEX, had financed the study, and that data inputs for it were provided by Enbridge themselves. In the end, a UMD Professor behind the research severed the school's ties with APEX. While there might not be significant long term job creation, supporters assert that even some temporary employment would be a key source of income for numerous families in Minnesota. The original EIS also distinguished between long and short term jobs, but came to different conclusions saying, "Based on the small number of permanent jobs, it is likely that operation of the pipeline would result in no to negligible impact on the per capita household income, median household income, or unemployment rates in the ROI (region of interest.)” The pipeline's possible impact on jobs in Minnesota remains contested.

==== Tax revenue ====
Line 3 supporters argue that counties along the proposed route will benefit from the revenue of Enbridge's property taxes. In the first year of the new pipeline's operations, Enbridge has been projected to pay $19.5 million in property taxes along the route. That number would increase over time. Those opposed to the pipeline are unconvinced about the promise of that revenue, however, citing lawsuits in which Enbridge claimed that they had been overtaxed, and left counties across Minnesota in debt for tens of millions of dollars.

==== Use for oil industry ====
Construction of the Line 3 pipeline would help the Canadian oil industry increase their production and stabilize prices. Enbridge has argued that Line 3 would help meet the demand of Minnesota's oil refineries, and they are not the only company hoping the pipeline is built. Line 3 is seen as key to the Canadian oil industry. Difficulty transporting oil out of Alberta has led to production cuts and price discounting. Thousands of Canadians have lost their jobs in oil infrastructure due to instability in Alberta's oil sands economy. Additionally, companies which are unable to ship their product through pipelines have considered expanding train shipments of oil. Recent studies have highlighted that train transportation of oil results in more regular spills than transport by pipe. In his endorsement of Line 3, the Prime Minister of Canada, Justin Trudeau, supported this argument:

(Transport of oil by rail) is less economic, and more dangerous for communities, and is higher in terms of greenhouse gas emissions than modern pipelines would be.

— Justin Trudeau, Canadian Prime Minister, CBC

Enbridge estimates that Line 3 would replace more than 10,000 rail cars transporting oil every day. The group Minnesotans for Line 3 says that by approving the pipeline, government regulators could ensure safer transport of millions of barrels of oil a year. The Minnesota Department of Commerce, in their testimony against Line 3, questioned these projections, claiming they fail to consider a variety of possible future demands for oil.

== See also ==
- List of oil pipelines
- List of pipeline accidents in the United States in the 21st century
