= Valve Turners =

The Valve Turners is a label given to, and claimed by, environmental activists who take direct action against the fossil fuel industry by illegally turning emergency shut-off valves to close oil pipelines. Valve Turners have sought to use the necessity defense in court, arguing that they were obligated to act in the face of the imminent threat of climate change to which oil pipelines contribute. In some cases, they have invoked Indigenous sovereignty and treaty rights.

== Incidents ==
Different groups of activists have acted as Valve Turners. In most events, participants have contacted the pipelines' owners to notify them that the valves are being closed, so that the companies can take appropriate safety measures. They have then waited to be arrested and used their trials to draw attention to climate change.

=== December 2015: Enbridge Line 9 ===
Enbridge reversed its Line 9 pipeline on December 3, 2015, to transport western crude oil to eastern refineries. In response, Canadian activists turned the emergency shut-off valve at a site near the Quebec-Ontario border on December 7. After closing the valve and stopping the flow of oil, they locked themselves to the valve with U-locks around their necks. Two weeks later, another set of activists turned an emergency shut-off valve on Line 9 in Sarnia, Ontario.

=== October 2016: Climate Direct Action ===
On October 11, five members of Climate Direct Action simultaneously turned emergency shut-off valves in four American states. This was the largest valve-turning action to date, temporarily disabling pipelines providing about 15% of America's daily oil consumption.

- Michael Foster turned a valve in North Dakota near the Canadian border. He was convicted of several felonies and was sentenced to three years in prison, two of which were suspended. Foster was the only valve turner to be imprisoned.
- Leonard Higgins turned a valve on the Enbridge Express Pipeline near Coal Banks Landing, Montana. Higgins was convicted of felony criminal mischief and misdemeanor trespassing but had his three-year prison sentence deferred.
- Emily Johnston and Annette Klapstein turned the valves on two Enbridge pipelines near Leonard, Minnesota. Their court case was dismissed.
- Ken Ward turned a valve near Mount Vernon, Washington, to shut down Kinder Morgan's Trans Mountain pipeline. After a mistrial, Ward was convicted of burglary, acquitted of sabotage, and served two days in prison.

All five participants planned to use the necessity defense to draw attention to their cause and justify their actions, though three were not permitted to do so. The judge presiding over the Johnston & Klapstein trial, Robert Tiffany, initially ruled that they could mount the necessity defense. However, he then reversed his decision, prohibiting expert testimony that would establish the argument for necessity, before dismissing the case before the defendants could present its necessity defense. Klapstein said she was happy the charges were dismissed, but "at the same time, we were indeed disappointed not to be able to present this to the jury. We were hoping to educate the jury and the classroom of greater public opinion on the dire issues of climate change". Foster, Higgins, and Ward were prohibited by the judges overseeing their cases from mounting the necessity defense.

This group calls itself Climate Direct Action but became known as the Valve Turners and released a film under that name composed of footage they recorded before and during the process of turning the shut-off valves.

=== February 2019: Enbridge Line 4 ===
Four members of the Catholic Worker Movement—Michele Naar-Obed, Allyson Polman, Brenna Cussen Anglada, Daniel Yildirim—were arrested on February 4, 2019, for attempting to shut down the Enbridge Line 4 pipeline near Grand Rapids, MN. This group called itself "The Four Necessity Valve Turners," a nod to the necessity defense for their actions. The activists informed Enbridge of their planned action, at which point the company shut down the pipeline remotely. In their trial, the judge permitted a limited necessity defense. In 2021, they were found guilty of a misdemeanor of aiding and abetting criminal damage to property under $500, and sentenced to a $75 fine and a sentence of 15 days.

== Response ==
Several US states, including Louisiana and Oklahoma, have increased the legal penalties for interfering with fossil fuel infrastructure, using a model bill from the American Legislative Exchange Council (ALEC) that enacts stiff consequences for protesters who target "critical infrastructure".

A 2020 intelligence bulletin from the Department of Homeland Security described the 2016 Valve Turners as "suspected environmental rights extremists".
