= Prairie River (Mississippi River tributary) =

- Mouth of the Prairie River

Location
- Country: United States
- State: Minnesota
- County: Itasca

Physical characteristics
- Source
  - coordinates: 47.5940994°N 93.181022°W
- Mouth
  - coordinates: 47.2149433°N 93.4824358°W
- Length: 50 mi (80 km)
- Discharge
  - location: USGS gauge near Taconite
  - average: 211.6 cu ft/s (5.99 m^{3}/s), USGS water years 1967-2019
- Discharge
  - location: mouth
  - average: 298.1 cu ft/s (8.44 m^{3}/s) (estimate)

The Prairie River is a river in Itasca County, Minnesota. The river is located in northern Minnesota, near the communities of Taconite, Bovey, Grand Rapids, and La Prairie. It is a tributary of the Mississippi River.

In 1991 Enbridge's Line 3 pipeline ruptured near Grand Rapids, spilling 1.7 million of gallons of oil into the area, including the river, in the largest inland oil spill in US history.

On May 4, 1988, the world record shorthead redhorse (Moxostoma macrolepidotum), which weighed 5 pounds 6 ounces (2.4 kg), was caught on the Prairie River by angler Greg Clusiau.

== See also ==
- List of rivers of Minnesota
- List of longest streams of Minnesota
