= Water protectors =

Environmental activists from an Indigenous perspective

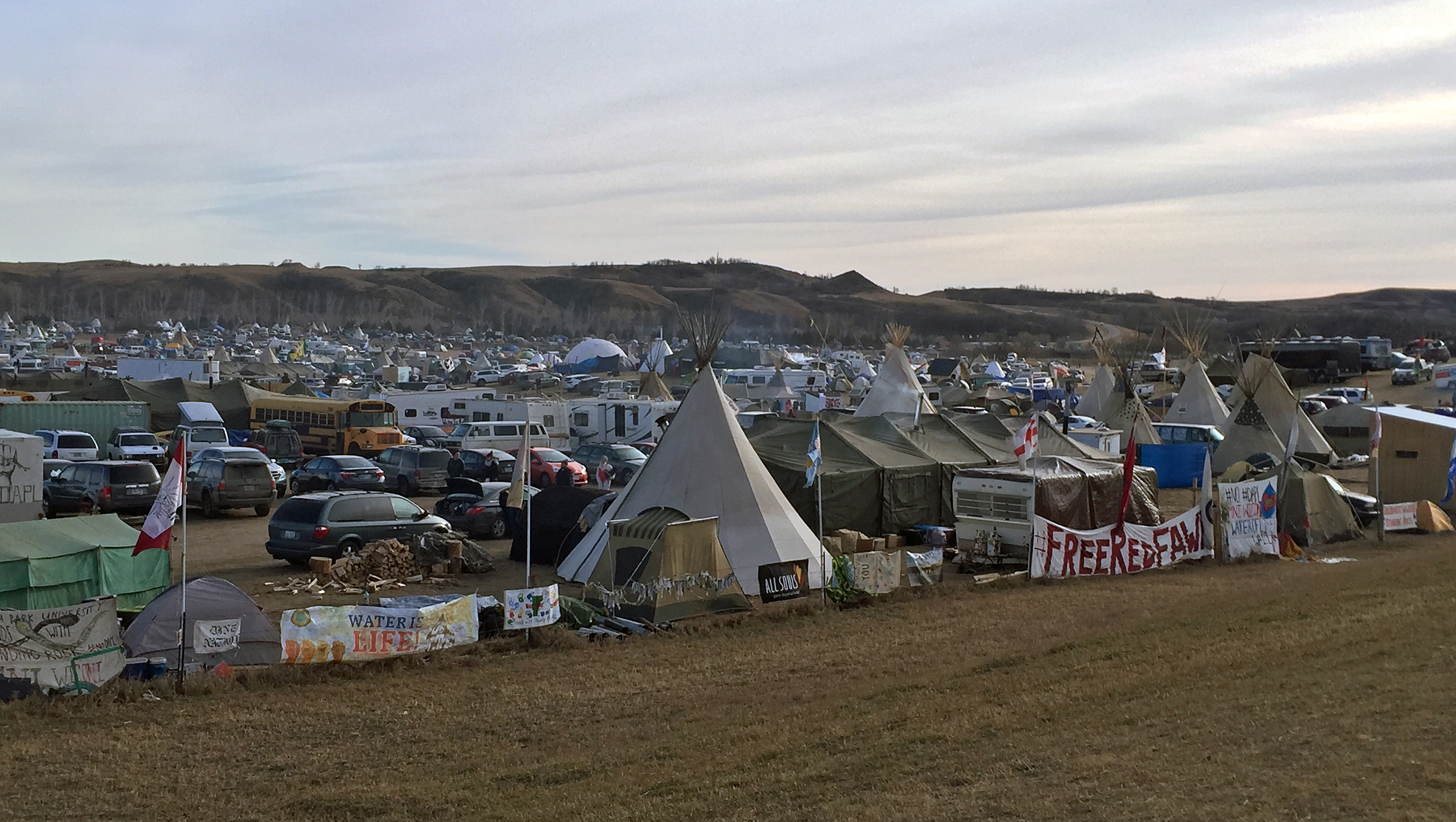
Oceti Sakowin encampment at the Dakota Access Pipeline protests camps in North Dakota

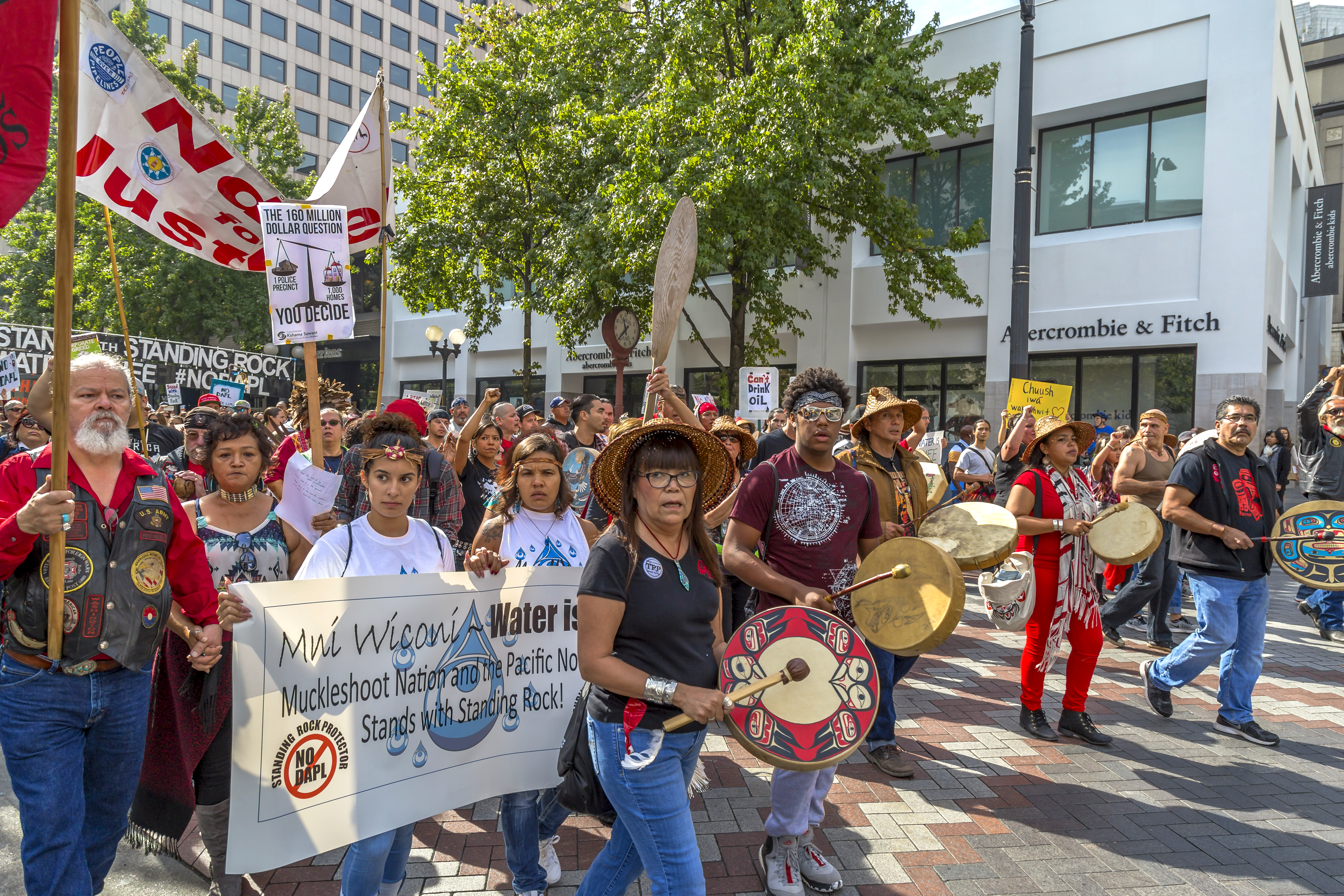
Water protectors marching in Seattle

Members of the "Light Brigade" asserting their role as "Protectors" of the waters, during the Dakota Access Pipeline protests

Water protectors are activists, organizers, and cultural workers focused on the defense of the world's water and water systems. The water protector name, analysis and style of activism arose from Indigenous communities in North America during the Dakota Access Pipeline protests at the Standing Rock Reservation, which began with an encampment on LaDonna Brave Bull Allard's land in April, 2016.

Water protectors are similar to land defenders, but are distinguished from other environmental activists by this philosophy and approach that is rooted in an indigenous cultural perspective that sees water and the land as sacred. This relationship with water moves beyond simply having access to clean drinking water, and comes from the beliefs that water is necessary for life and that water is a relative and therefore it must be treated with respect. As such, the reasons for protection of water are older, more holistic, and integrated into a larger cultural and spiritual whole than in most modern forms of environmental activism, which may be more based in seeing water and other extractive resources as commodities.

Historically, water protectors have been led by or composed of women; in this way, it is comparable to the ecofeminist movement.

== "Water is Life (Mni Wiconi)" ==
"Water is life" is an expression that is connected to water protectors. The expression arises from the relationships that Indigenous communities have with water and other forms of life that they view as vital for their survival. "Water is Life" reflects the long lasting relationships that Indigenous communities have with water and what water protectors are fighting for. "Water is Life" does not just represent the need for Indigenous peoples access to clean water, but represents how water is used in ceremony and the important role water plays in their belief systems. As Potawatomi philosopher Kyle Powys Whyte explains, the idea that "water is life" is based in "Indigenous governance systems that support cultural integrity, economic vitality, and political self-determination and the capacity to shift and adjust to the dynamics of ecosystems."

Thus, in many Indigenous communities water is seen as something that brings life to other beings around it, and it is seen as a member of society that must be protected. Since water is held in such high regard, people offer gifts to the water, pray and sing to water in order to create a relationship with water and protect it. Since women are seen as life-givers in Indigenous communities, they are often the ones who are responsible for protecting the water. Oceti Sakowin historian Nick Estes provides context to the “Water Is Life” movement, framing it in the context of Indigenous resistance from perpetual colonialist destruction.

== Role and actions ==
Water protectors have been involved in actions against construction of multiple pipelines, as well as other projects by the fossil fuel industries, and resource extraction activities such as fracking that can lead to the contamination of water.

Actions have involved traditional direct actions like blockades on reserve lands and traditional territories to block corporations from engaging in resource extraction. Water and land protectors have also created resistance camps as a way to re-occupy and refuse to give away their traditional territories. Usually part of these encampments, when led by Indigenous people, is a strengthening of cultural ties and traditions, with inclusion of activities like language revitalization. They also take actions outside of protesting that are rooted in ceremony. These actions include singing songs to water, offering tobacco to water, and praying to the water. Such actions reflect the importance that water holds to these communities.

Many water protectors are women. In many Native American and FNIM cultures, women are seen to have a strong connection to water, the moon, and the cycles of the tide as they are able to become pregnant and give birth. Because they give life, Indigenous women hold important roles and are highly valued in their communities. Thus, women are also responsible for taking care of water, and the water will return the favor by giving life to the surrounding environment. In Anishinaabe culture, for example, women perform ceremonies to honour water and water is considered to be alive and have a spirit.

Josephine Mandamin was an Anishinaabe elder and activist who initiated Mother Earth Walks, also known as Mother Earth Water Walks (MEWW). She and other women began to walk, carrying copper buckets of water, around the Great Lakes. As the women walked, they sang and prayed, strengthening the deep ties between their communities and the Great Lakes, along with their personal connections to the water and the land. These walks and related events raised awareness and brought many Native women into a stronger relationship with the water. Although Mandamin died in February 2019, her water walks have inspired many other water walks to continue in her memory.

Other well-known water protectors include Autumn Peltier (of the Wikwemikong First Nation); Marjorie Flowers (Inuit), LaDonna Brave Bull Allard (Dakota, Lakota), and Faith Spotted Eagle (Yankton Sioux).

=== The Dakota Access Pipeline ===
In 2016, Native communities protested the 1,172 mile long Dakota Access Pipeline. The protest was due to the fact that the pipeline was supposed to be built on the land of Indigenous communities, and was putting water sources that those communities depend on in danger. Water protectors were the frontline of this protest, dedicating their time to protecting the water source and upholding their treaties. As Potawatomi ecologist and botanist Robin Wall Kimmerer and environmental philosopher Kathleen Dean Moore explain, "it is possible to love land and water so fiercely you will live in a tent in a North Dakota winter to protect them."

The movement gained media attention quickly, and is viewed as one of the biggest Native led resistance movements in decades. However, during this protest, some media outlets such as The Blaze ran a misinformation campaign against Water Protectors. This false information created a narrative that was harmful to water protectors and Native communities as a whole.

=== Alton Gas ===
In May 2018 Mi'kmaq peoples in Nova Scotia blocked the Alton Gas company from extracting water from the Shubenacadie River for a natural gas project; the project was disrupting the natural balance between freshwater and seawater in the tidal region, and threatening the drinking water, fish and other water life of the region.

=== Muskrat Falls ===
Action has also been taken across Canada, including Muskrat Falls hydro dam project in Labrador.

=== Trans Mountain Pipeline ===
In Burnaby Mountain, thousands have staged demonstrations opposing the Trans Mountain pipeline.

=== Wetʼsuwetʼen resistance camps ===
The Wetʼsuwetʼen peoples have ongoing of resistance camps, including Unistʼotʼen Camp and action against the construction of a Coastal GasLink pipeline and the heavily militarized RCMP, in Northern British Columbia.

=== Enbridge Line 3 resistance camps ===
The Stop Line 3 protests are an ongoing series of demonstrations in the U.S. state of Minnesota against the expansion of Enbridge's Line 3 oil pipeline along a new route. Over 800 water protectors were arrested between August 2020 and September 2021.

=== L'eau Est La Vie camp (Bayou Bridge Pipeline) ===
Water protectors at L'eau Est La Vie (Water is Life) camp resisted the Bayou Bridge Pipeline from 2017 until its completion in 2019 through direct action and legal battles causing significant delays and added cost to the project.

== Water protectors in popular culture and media ==
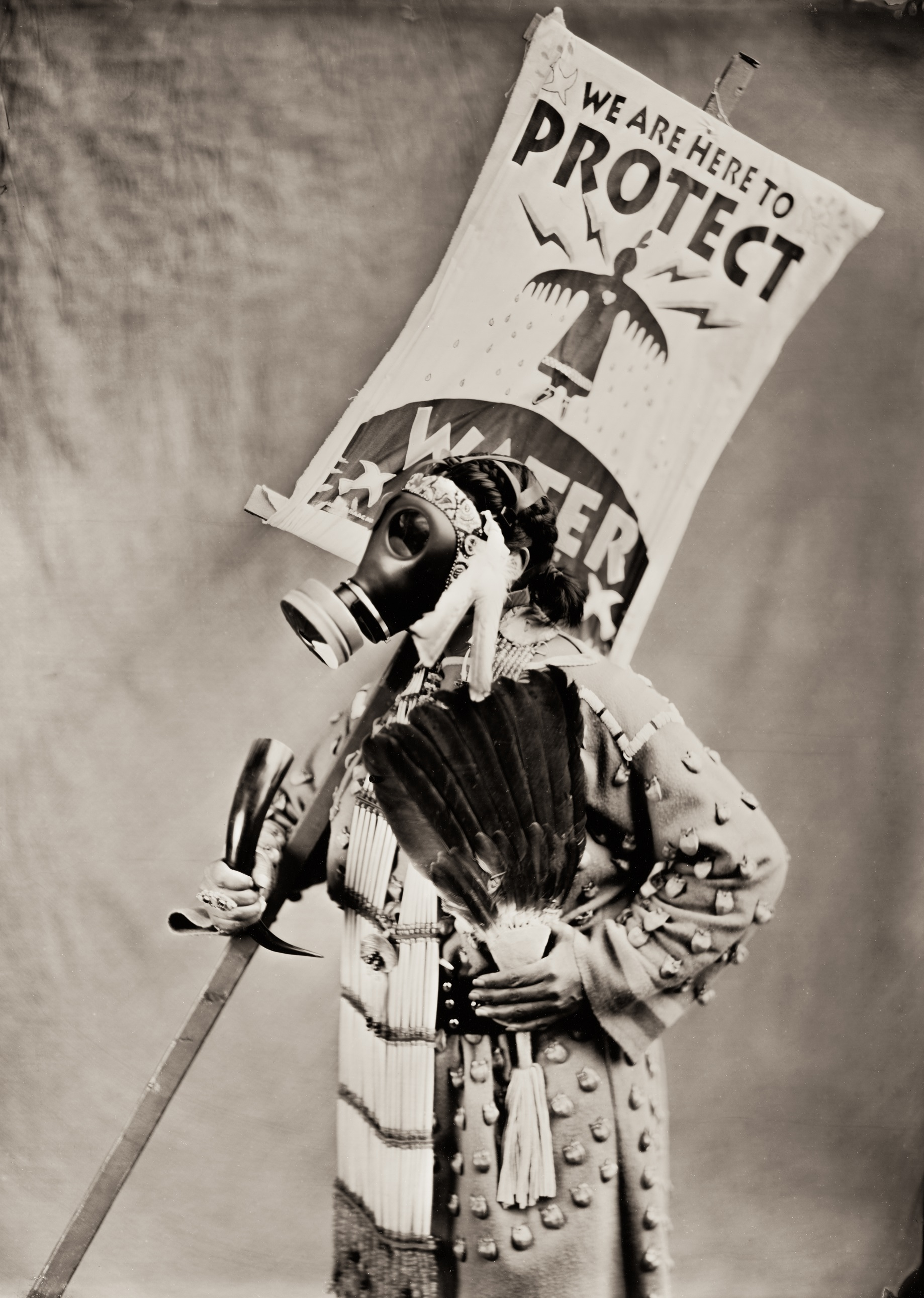
No Spiritual Surrender" with Floris White Bull, Hunkpapa Lakota - Cochiti Pueblo. Holding protest sign with image of Thunderbird woman created by Isaac Murdoch, Serpent River First Nation.

Several children's books have been published about water protectors. The Water Walker is a picture book written and illustrated by Joanne Robertson and tells the story or Josephine Mandamin and her love of nibi (water), her water walks, and the importance of protecting water. We Are Water Protectors, written by Carole Lindstrom and illustrated by Michaela Goad, was the winner of the 2021 Caldecott Medal, as well as a Kirkus prize finalist and Kirkus best book of 2020. The story is "inspired by the many Indigenous-led movements across North America." The story gives information about the role of water protectors in communities and the importance of water protection.

Films and documentaries have been produced featuring the roles and actions of water protectors. Awake: A Dream from Standing Rock was released by Bullfrog films in 2017. It documents the water protectors efforts near the Standing Rock reservation to stop the development of the Dakota Access Pipeline (DAPL). It has been called the most acclaimed of the documentaries produced in the wake of the Standing Rock action.

The National Film Board of Canada featured a story and curated set of films on water protectors on their blog in 2016. The post traces the history of pipeline resistance against the backdrop of the Standing Rock resistance, and features photos and the film selection Citizens vs. oil giants. The Water Protectors' Journey Along the Sipekne'katik River was produced and directed by Eliza Knockwood and premiered in May 2018. The film documents the work of the Mi'kmaq Water Protectors to protect the Sipekne'katik River from the brine being dumped into it by Alton Gas.
