= Lisa Mirabello =

American medical geneticist

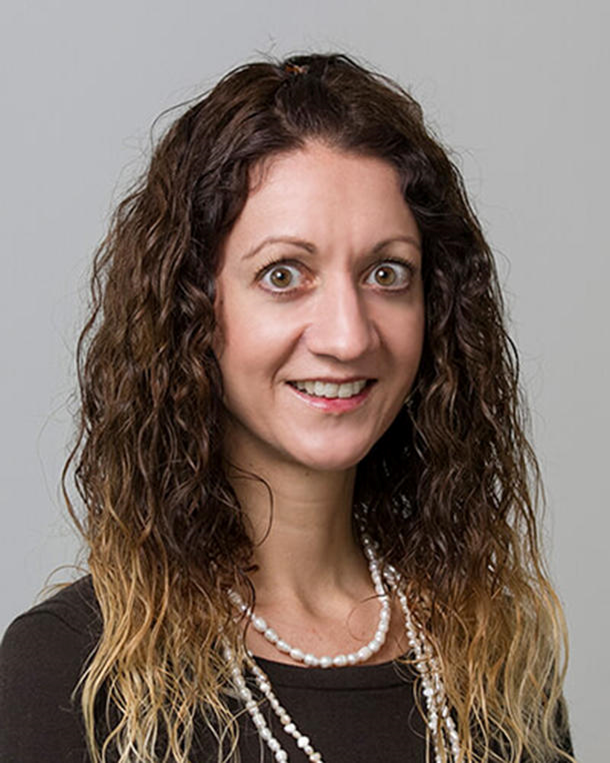
- Education: University at Albany, SUNY, Cornell University, and New York Medical College
- Scientific career
- Fields: Genetic susceptibility, pediatric cancer, HPV
- Workplaces: National Cancer Institute

Lisa J. Mirabello is an American medical geneticist who researches genetic susceptibility to pediatric cancer and the genomics of HPV carcinogenicity. She is a senior investigator in the clinical genetics branch at the National Cancer Institute.

== Life ==
Lisa Mirabello earned her Ph.D. in biomedical sciences with a focus on molecular population genetics and infectious disease from the University at Albany, SUNY School of Public Health in 2007. Her dissertation was titled, Molecular population genetics of the malaria vector Anopheles darlingi throughout Central and South America using mitochondrial, nuclear, and microsatellite markers. Her dissertation committee members included Jan Conn, Laura D. Kramer, Robert L. Glaser, Gregory Ebel, and Jason Cryan. Mirabello worked as a Graduate Research Assistant at the New York State Department of Health, Wadsworth Center from 2003 to 2007. After that, Dr. Mirabello joined the Clinical Genetics Branch of the National Cancer Institute's (NCI) Division of Cancer Epidemiology and Genetics (DCEG) as a postdoctoral Cancer Genetics research fellow in 2007.

Dr. Mirabello was promoted to a DCEG research fellow in 2010 and she was appointed as an Earl Stadtman Investigator in 2013. She was awarded National Institutes of Health (NIH) scientific tenure and promoted to senior principal investigator in 2019. Dr. Mirabello's research program is focused on genetic susceptibility to pediatric cancer and the genomics of HPV carcinogenicity. Her most cited work is Osteosarcoma incidence and survival rates from 1973 to 2004, which studied the large differences in incidence and survival rates by age of 3482 patients with osteosarcoma. Mirabello has earned a series of accolades over the course of her career, including five DCEG Intramural Research Awards (IRAs) and three NCI Director's Intramural Innovation Awards.

== Selected works and publications ==
- Rafati M, Guenther LM, Egolf L, Gianferante M, Kim J, Wang K, Zhu B, Spector L, Anderson N, Janeway KA, Barkauskas DA, Hawkins DS, Patiño-Garcia A, Lecanda F, Lupo PJ, Scheurer ME, Morton L, Armstrong GT, Sapkota Y, Gramatges M, Serra M, Hattinger C, Scotlandi K, Amary F, Andrulis IL, Wunder JS, Ballinger ML, Thomas DM, Yeager M, Dean M, Stewart DR, Vogt A, Liu J, Hicks BD, Huang WY, Savage SA, Chanock SJ, Mirabello L (2025): SMARCAL1 is a new osteosarcoma predisposition gene. J Natl Cancer Inst, Sep 25:djaf278. PMC12702491. https://DOI: 10.1093/jnci/djaf278.
- Mirabello L, Yeager M, Yu K, Clifford GM, Xiao Y, Zhu B, Cullen M, Boland JF, Wentzensen N, Nelson CW, Raine-Bennett T, Chen Z, Bass S, Song L, Yang Q, Steinberg M, Burdett L, Dean M, Roberson D, Mitchell J, Lorey T, Franceschi S, Castle PE, Walker J, Zuna R, Kreimer AR, Beachler DC, Hildesheim A, Gonzalez P, Porras C, Burk RD, Schiffman M (2017). HPV16 E7 genetic conservation is critical to carcinogenesis. Cell, 170(6):1164-1174.e6. PMC5674785. https://doi: 10.1016/j.cell.2017.08.033.
- Mirabello L, Yeager M, Cullen M, Boland JF, Chen Z, Wentzensen N, Zhang X, Yu K, Yang Q, Xiao Y, Mitchell J, Roberson D, Bass S, Burdette L, Raine-Bennett R, Lorey T, Castle PE, Burk RD, Schiffman M (2016): HPV16 sublineage associations with histology-specific cancer risk using HPV whole-genome sequences in 3,200 women. J Natl Cancer Inst, 108(9). PMC5939630. https://ddoi: 10.1093/jnci/djw100.
- Mirabello, L., Troisi, R. J., & Savage, S. A. (2009). Osteosarcoma incidence and survival rates from 1973 to 2004. Cancer, 115(7), 1531–1543. https://doi.org/10.1002/cncr.24121
- Nelson, C. W., & Mirabello, L. (2023). Human papillomavirus genomics: Understanding carcinogenicity. Tumour Virus Research, 15, 200258. https://doi.org/10.1016/j.tvr.2023.200258
- The ICGC/TCGA Pan-Cancer Analysis of Whole Genomes Consortium. (2020). Pan-cancer analysis of whole genomes. Nature, 578(7793), 82–93. https://doi.org/10.1038/s41586-020-1969-6
- Wentzensen, I. M., Mirabello, L., Pfeiffer, R. M., & Savage, S. A. (2011). The Association of Telomere Length and Cancer: a Meta-analysis. Cancer Epidemiology Biomarkers & Prevention, 20(6), 1238–1250. https://doi.org/10.1158/1055-9965.epi-11-0005

== See also ==
- List of University at Albany people
