= Enbridge Line 5 =

Major Canadian oil pipeline

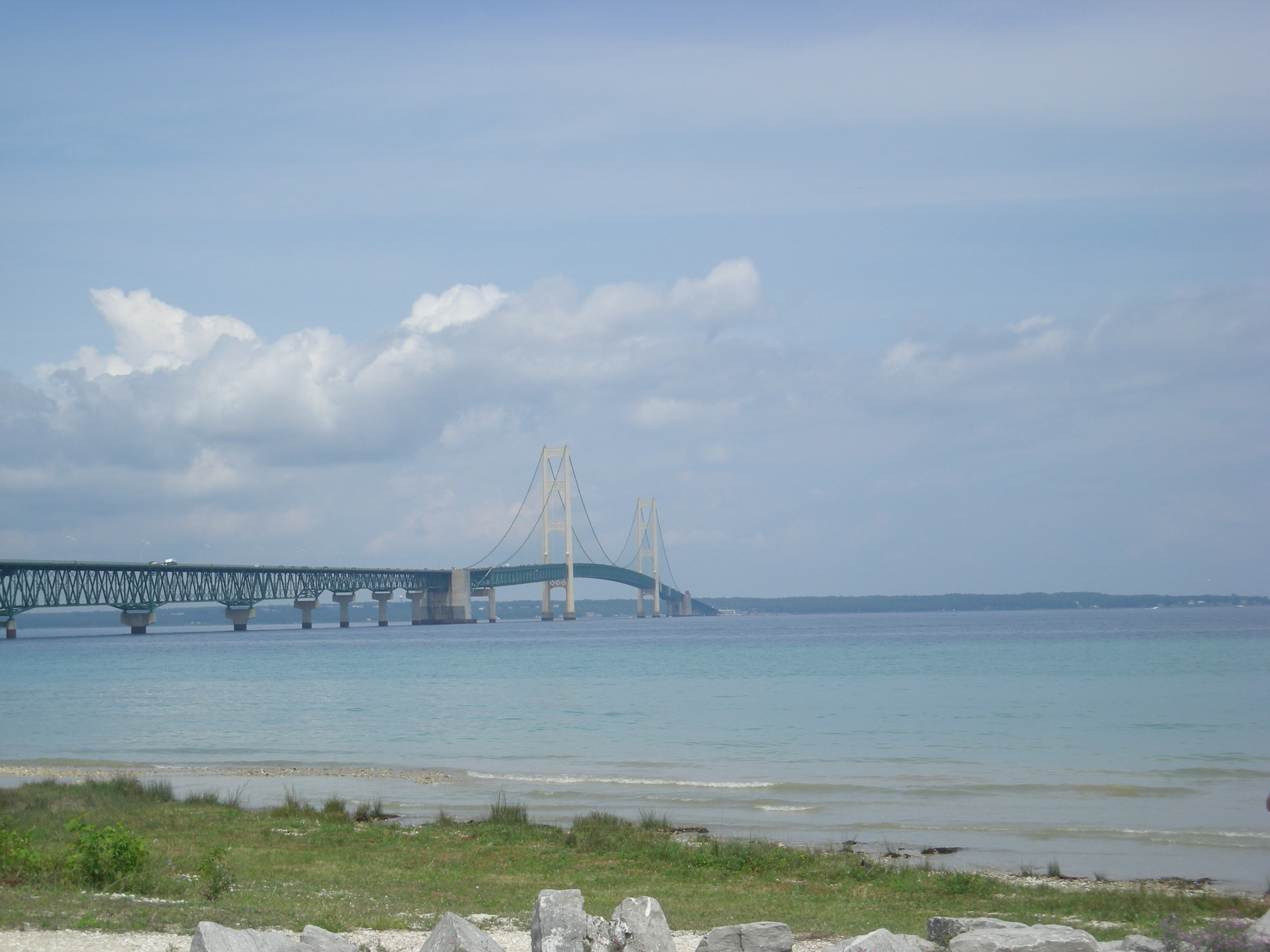
- Line 5 passes underneath the Straits of Mackinac.

Location
- Country: United States, Canada
- State: Wisconsin, Michigan
- Start: Superior, Wisconsin
- To: Sarnia, Ontario

General information
- Type: Oil
- Owner: Enbridge
- Commissioned: 1953; 73 years ago

Technical information
- Length: 645 mi (1,038 km)
- Diameter: 30 in (762 mm)

Enbridge Line 5 is a 645-mile oil pipeline owned by the Canadian multinational corporation Enbridge. Constructed in 1953, the pipeline conveys crude oil from western Canada to eastern Canada via the Great Lakes states. Line 5 is part of the Enbridge Lakehead System and passes under the environmentally-sensitive Straits of Mackinac, which connect Lake Michigan to Lake Huron. The 30-inch pipeline carries 540,000 barrels (86,000 m^{3}) of synthetic crude, natural gas liquids, sweet crude, and light sour crude per day as of 2013.

From 1967 to 2017, Line 5 spilled over 1.1 million gallons of oil. In December 2018, the Michigan Department of Natural Resources announced that the Mackinac Straits Corridor Authority (MSCA), with outgoing Governor Rick Snyder approving Enbridge's plan to replace the underwater segment of Line 5 with a new pipeline segment housed in a tunnel.

== Route ==
The Line 5 pipeline runs between Superior, Wisconsin, and Sarnia, Ontario, two major nodes of the Enbridge Pipeline System. The Enbridge terminal at Superior conveys western Canadian crude oil from various incoming pipelines (including Lines 1–4) to Line 5 and Line 6, which go around the northern and southern shores of Lake Michigan respectively. From Superior, Line 5 travels east to the Upper Peninsula of Michigan, then runs southeast to Rapid River, near Escanaba. At Rapid River, natural gas liquids (NGL) are side stream delivered for stripping, and the stripped NGLs are reinjected.

From Rapid River, the pipeline runs near the northern shore of Lake Michigan until it reaches the Straits of Mackinac. There the pipeline divides into two separate 20-inch (51 cm) lines, which reunite when they reach McGulpin Point on the southern side of the straits. The lines are buried until they reach a depth of 65 feet (20 m). The lines descend to a depth of approximately 270 feet (82 m) under the straits.

Once on land again in the Lower Peninsula, Line 5 runs near Interstate 75 to Bay City. At the Lewiston pumping station, US sweet crude may be injected. From Lewiston, Line 5 loops around Saginaw Bay, then runs southeast to the St. Clair River.

Just before the St. Clair River, Line 5 reaches the Marysville pumping station. Volumes destined for Michigan and Ohio refineries such as BP Husky and Marathon Detroit are offloaded there, and transferred to a Sunoco pipeline that runs from Marysville to Toledo.

The line then proceeds east across the St. Clair River to Ontario, where it rejoins Line 6 and terminates at Sarnia. Any volumes not destined for Sarnia-area refineries are then pumped into tanks for transfer to Enbridge Line 7.

== History ==
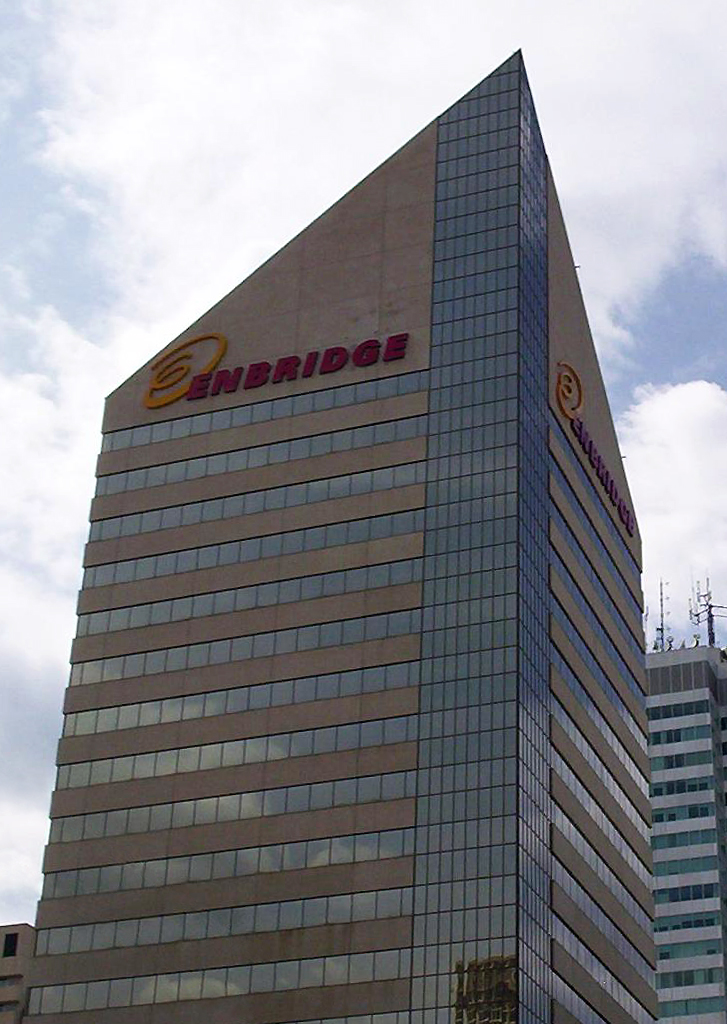
Enbridge headquarters in Edmonton, Alberta

The construction of Line 5 was completed in 1953. The pipelines from western Canada to Superior had been completed in 1950. Prior to the construction of Line 5, the crude oil was conveyed from Superior to southern Ontario by oil tankers.

In 2013, the line's capacity was increased by 50,000 barrels (7,900 m^{3}) per day, from 490,000 to 540,000 barrels (78,000 to 86,000 m^{3}). The upgrade involved US$100 million in improvements to pumping stations, but with no upgrades to the actual pipes.

As of 2017, Line 5 had spilled at least 1.1 million gallons since 1967. In 2018, a tugboat anchor hit the pipeline, causing a fluid leak and minor damage to the pipe.

Also in 2018, Enbridge and the State of Michigan agreed to build a tunnel beneath the Straits of Mackinac that will contain the pipeline. Line 5 in the Straits consists of two 20-inch pipelines, an east leg and a west leg, running parallel to each other for the 4.5 miles across the lakebed.

On June 18, 2020, a screw anchor support on the east leg was found to have shifted from its original position. The shift was caused by Enbridge's seasonal maintenance work, which affected the anchor support and not the pipeline itself. On June 20, 2020, Enbridge reported that a June 19 remote-operated vehicle inspection of the west leg of Line 5 in the Straits had detected no issues or damage to the anchor structures or pipeline. Operations resumed on that line on the same day. The east leg was to remain shut down. The federal regulator, Pipeline and Hazardous Materials Safety Administration raised no objections to the plan. Enbridge CEO Al Monaco responded to Michigan Governor Gretchen Whitmer to confirm that Enbridge was committed to sharing what is learned about the incident with the screw anchor assembly on the east leg with PHMSA and the State of Michigan.

=== Mackinac Straits Corridor Authority (MSCA) agreement about tunnel ===
On December 19, 2018, the Michigan Department of Natural Resources announced that the Mackinac Straits Corridor Authority (MSCA), in correspondence with outgoing Governor Rick Snyder, had approved a plan to build a multi-purpose tunnel that would house multiple utility lines, to remove the old Enbridge Line 5 and to construct a new line. The MSCA approved the transfer of a property right, allowing Enbridge to construct the new tunnel in the bedrock beneath the Straits of Mackinac. The project has faced fierce opposition from environmentalists and several tribal authorities.

=== Lawsuits (2019–present) ===
In late June 2019, the state of Michigan filed a lawsuit asking the Ingham County Court to compel the decommissioning of the segment of Line 5 that runs under the Straits of Mackinac. The dual pipes, in use since 1953, were then shipping 540,000 barrels of oil and propane per day. A Reuters news report defined Line 5 as "a critical part of Enbridge's Mainline network, which delivers the bulk of Canadian crude exports to the United States". The basis of the suit is the claim that the pipeline is a public nuisance and violates the Michigan Environmental Protection Act since it may become a major source of pollution. The news report added that "it is unclear if Line 5 could operate without the Straits segment". Attorney General Dana Nessel commented: "We cannot prevent accidental or emergency anchor deployments in one of the busiest shipping channels in the Great Lakes. And it only takes one such incident to cause an environmental and economic catastrophe. That is a risk no one should be willing to take". Michigan Senate Republicans expressed concern about the potential shutdown of the pipeline, which they said could create other problems: "the loss of thousands of construction jobs expected from the tunnel construction, an increase in costs at Detroit and Toledo refineries and the loss of a significant mode of propane transportation in Michigan. It is estimated that replacing the propane lost by closing the line would require an additional 30,000 truckloads and 9,600 rail cars annually". In April 2024, the U.S. Supreme Court sided with Michigan, ruling that the state's lawsuit to shut down the pipeline will remain in state court.

In June 2020, the U.S. Sixth Circuit Court of Appeals ruled the emergency response for the pipeline was adequate to protect wildlife in the Straits of Mackinac and the Michigan Court of Appeals sided with its ruling. Enbridge has stated that the pipeline is in good condition even though the outer coating has worn away in some places and steel braces are placed at places hit by erosion. It plans the construction of a utility tunnel in the bedrock under the Straits of Mackinac-the connector of Lake Michigan and Lake Huron, to house the Line 5 pipeline and to replace its six-kilometer underwater segment. Enbridge intends to begin work on the tunnel once it received all the necessary permits and expected to complete construction by 2024.

In 2019, the Bad River Band of Lake Superior Chippewa filed a lawsuit against Enbridge. The tribe had revoked Enbridge's easement on its land in 2013, but after negotiations failed the company refused to remove the pipeline. In June 2023, district judge William Conley ruled that Enbridge was guilty of trespassing and awarded $5.1 million in damage payments. Enbridge was ordered to find an alternative route or shut the pipeline down by June 2026. The case was appealed and in February 2026 oral arguments in the case were presented to the United States Supreme Court.

In May 2021, citing a 1977 treaty with the United States on the uninterrupted flow of oil and gas across the border, the Canadian government asked a U.S. court to stop Michigan from shutting down the pipeline, thus triggering a bilateral negotiation with Washington. The pipeline supplies fuel to much of Ontario and Quebec.

In June 2022, the Environmental Permit Review Commission inside the Michigan Department of Environment, Great Lakes and Energy re-instated a petition from the Bay Mills Indian Community, who challenged a permit Enbridge needs to build its tunnel.

== Controversies ==
The 2013 expansion, coupled with the anticipated expansion of the Alberta Clipper pipeline, led to concerns from the National Wildlife Federation and other groups over the possible shipment of diluted bitumen from the Alberta oil sands through Line 5. However, Enbridge has denied any plans to pump such materials. Line 5 ships nearly 23 million gallons of crude oil and petroleum products every day. A 2011 toll agreement describes the materials as "condensate, light synthetic, sweet, light sour and NGL," as does a 2013 summary of the Mainline System. Due to national security concerns, however, the Pipeline and Hazardous Materials Safety Administration does not divulge the materials actually carried on major US pipelines, including Line 5.

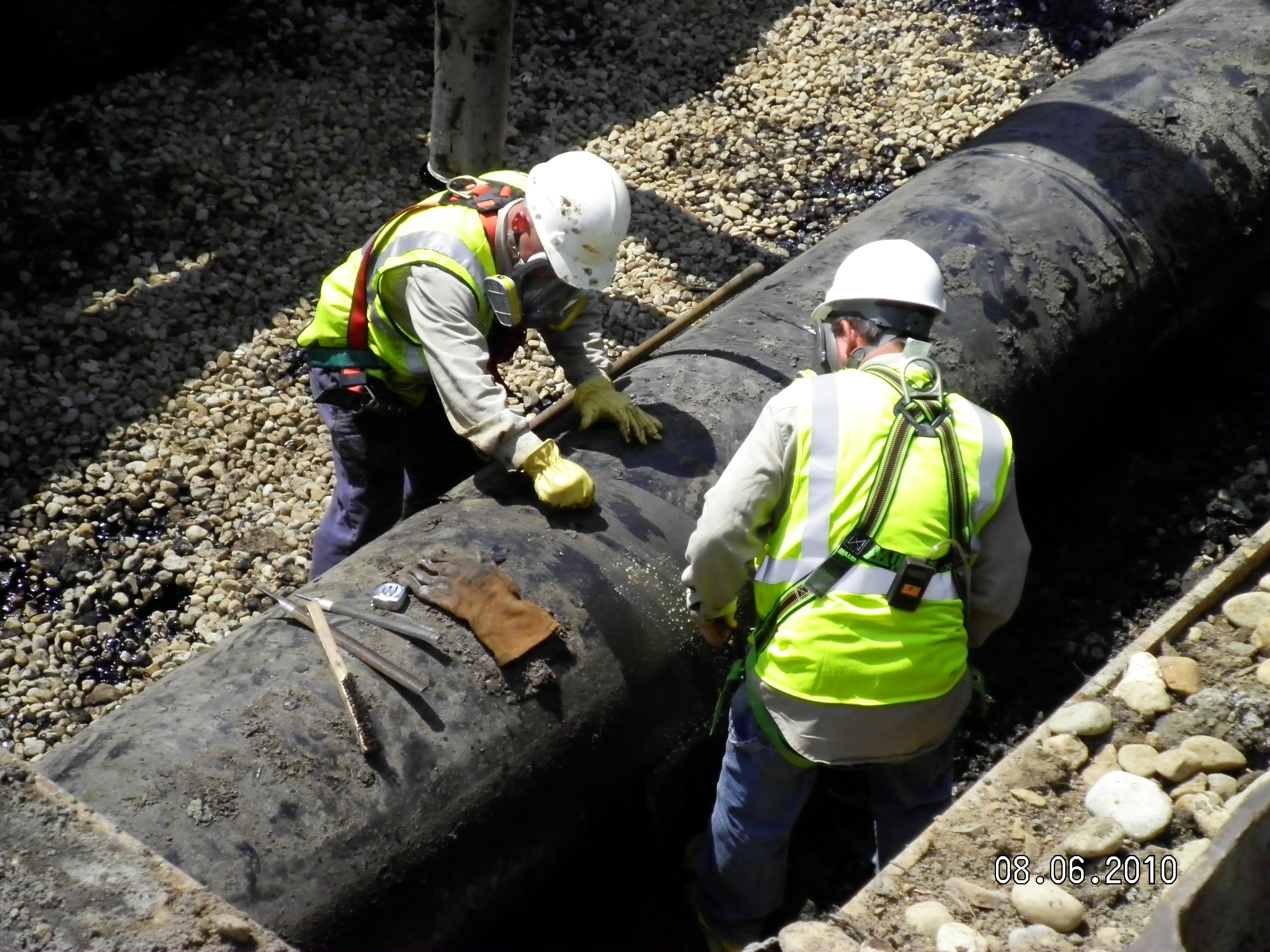
Technicians preparing to remove a section of Enbridge pipeline

Public concerns have particularly focused on the risk of a spill under the Straits of Mackinac, and the difficulty of controlling any spill that might occur. According to Enbridge, the pipes under the straits have never leaked, are continuously monitored, and are regularly inspected by underwater autonomous vehicles. However, there have been numerous spills elsewhere in Michigan from Enbridge pipelines, including a major Line 5 spill at Crystal Falls in 1999, as well as the 2010 Kalamazoo River oil spill on Line 6.

In 2014, it was found that Enbridge had failed to comply with the spacing requirement for supporting anchors for the pipeline; anchors should be placed at least every 75 feet. In a statement, Michigan Attorney General Bill Schuette requested that Enbridge comply with the safety regulations, "We will insist that Enbridge fully comply with the conditions of the Straits Pipeline Easement to protect our precious environmental and economic resources and limit the risk of disaster threatening our waters."

By the end of 2015, eight Michigan counties or municipalities were calling for the retirement of Line 5 including Cheboygan, Cheboygan County, Emmet County, Genesee County, Mackinaw City, Mentor Township, Munising Township, and Wayne County.

According to a 2016 study published by the University of Michigan, in partnership with the National Oceanic and Atmospheric Administration, a leak in Enbridge 5 near the Straits of Mackinac could affect roughly 700 miles of shoreline. Key areas recognized for the highest potential risk include Mackinac Island, Bois Blanc Island, Mackinaw City, and areas on the northern shore and southern shore of the Straits with 3,528 square miles (15%) of Lake Michigan's open water and roughly 13,611 square miles (60%) of Lake Huron's open water possibly impacted by visible oil. In addition, highly turbulent flowing currents found within the Straits of Mackinac, combined with the degrading enzymes secreted by zebra mussels, and aging pipe welds and coal tar enamel, increases the risk for corrosion and potential fissures to occur in the pipes. Due to these issues, expert reports concluded that Line 5 should be shut down in the Straits pending a full review under state public trust law. Although the University of Michigan study showcased worst case scenarios, experts recommend completing a risk analysis that includes, "1) analysis of environmental impacts, 2) cleanup costs, 3) restoration and remediation measures, 4) a natural resource damage assessment, and 5) Economic damage to public and private sector interests."

On April 15, 2022, the Wisconsin Department of Natural Resources (WDNR) closed the public comment period for its draft Environmental Impact Statement (EIS) after multiple extensions prompted by overwhelming numbers of public comments received. The current working draft of the EIS was released by the WDNR on December 16, 2021. The 369-page first volume of the document almost immediately drew sharp criticism from environmental advocates and tribal leadership of the Bad River Band of the Lake Superior Tribe of Chippewa Indians whose land is intersected by the pipeline. The WDNR hosted a public hearing on February 2, 2022, that lasted nearly 10 hours and was host to a number of arguments over the environmental, economic, and public health ramifications of the project. Congressman Tom Tiffany spoke in favor of the pipeline expansion and former Bad River Band chairman Mike Wiggins Jr. was one of many speaking against it.

In the course of the comment period, the DNR reportedly received over 32,000 comments. Parallels have been drawn between this controversy and the similar controversy surrounding Enbridge's Line 3 pipeline in Minnesota.

Bad River Band opposes Line 5 because of leak risks and expired easements. Its Mashkiiziibii Natural Resources Department has responded to numerous threats posed by the pipeline and summarized key concerns (anomaly digs, two helicopter crashes on their land, pipeline exposure within the Denomie Creek subwatershed and odor investigations).

In August 2022, the Canadian government again invoked a 1977 treaty with the United States in order to prevent the shutdown of the pipeline in Wisconsin, citing concerns about jobs, energy security, and the economy. Canada, which backs Enbridge, invoked the treaty for the first time in 2021 when the state of Michigan attempted to shut down Line 5 under the Straits of Mackinac due to environmental concerns.

== See also ==
- Line 3 pipeline
- Kalamazoo River oil spill
