= Gregory Ebel =

Canadian businessman (born 1964)

- Born: 2 April 1964 (age 62); Ottawa, Ontario
- Education: York University (BA '87)
- Spouse(s): Kimberly Van Belle; Terri Ebel

Gregory Lorne Ebel (born 2 April 1964) is a Canadian businessman and utilities executive who since January 2023 has been president of Enbridge. Ebel began his career in 1987 in political research, and in 1989 became a staffer in the Progressive Conservative government of Brian Mulroney. In 1993 he moved to Washington and spent the next several years working as an advisor to an executive director of the World Bank. Ebel entered private industry in 1998 when he joined Westcoast Energy in Vancouver. Following the acquisition of Westcoast by Duke Energy in 2002, he was given an executive role with Duke. From 2005 to 2006 he served as president of Union Gas, a Duke subsidiary. After Duke spun off its natural gas operations as Spectra Energy in 2007, Ebel became chief financial officer of the new company, and in 2009 became chairman and president. Ebel remained president until 2017, when Spectra was acquired by Enbridge. Following the purchase, Ebel was elected chairman of Enbridge. He remained in this office until the end of 2022, and at the beginning of 2023 relinquished the role to become president.

== Biography ==
Gregory Lorne Ebel was born in Ottawa, Ontario on 2 April 1964 to Lorne Arthur Ebel (1934–2019) and Dori Mary Hughson. Lorne and Dori married in 1953 and had four children: Lisa, Gregory, Pamela, and Matheson. During Gregory's childhood, the family moved around Ontario and Manitoba for Lorne's job as an executive with Kmart, and settled finally in Orangeville.

Gregory entered York University in 1983 and graduated Bachelor of Arts in 1987 with a degree in business administration. While at university, Ebel played slotback and wide receiver for the York Yeomen, and in the 1986 season was the team's leading receiver. Later in life, Ebel donated $40,000 to York's football programme and established the Frank Cosentino/Yeoman Football Award in honour of his head coach Frank Cosentino. Ebel began his career in 1987 with the Decima Research. Following the 1988 Canadian federal election that saw a return to government of the Progressive Conservative Party led by Brian Mulroney, in 1989 Ebel joined the government as chief of staff to Minister of Finance Michael Wilson. In 1991, he became chief of staff to new Minister of Finance Don Mazankowski, who held the additional post of Deputy Prime Minister. During his time in government, Ebel served as a senior advisor on privatisation and a spokesman for privatisation minister John McDermid. In the role, Ebel worked on the Petro-Canada and Air Canada files.

At the time of the 1993 Canadian federal election, Ebel left government and moved to Washington, D.C., where he became an advisor to Leonard M. Good, Canada's executive director of the World Bank. In 1995, the Financial Post published a short feature on Ebel entitled "Ready, willing and Ebel." In it, Ebel said that ten years hence he wanted to be "running a company, a province or a country." The author said that "for now, this 31-year-old wunder-guy is biding his time – and racking up international experience – in Washington as an adviser to the executive director at the World Bank Group." Almost exactly ten years later, Ebel became president of major company.

Ebel entered private industry in 1998, when he joined Westcoast Energy in Vancouver as vice-president for strategic development. Following the acquisition of Westcoast by Duke Energy in 2002, Ebel relocated to Charlotte, North Carolina to become managing director for mergers and acquisitions. In November of that year, Duke appointed him vice-president for investment and shareholder relations. In October 2004, Ebel was appointed president of Union Gas, which had been acquired by Westcoast in 1992 and was now part of Duke's portfolio of companies. The appointment was effective 1 January 2005. As president, Ebel worked out of the company's headquarters in Chatham, Ontario.

In July 2006, Duke formed a new subsidiary company to hold all its gas operations. The company, called Gas SpinCo. Inc. initially, was renamed Spectra Energy that November. On 2 January 2007, Spectra was spun off frum Duke as an independent, publicly traded company. When Spectra came into operation, Ebel left Union Gas and relocated to Houston, where he became the new company's chief financial officer. In June 2008, Ebel was chosen to succeed president Fred Fowler, would retire at the beginning of 2009.

In September 2016, Enbridge agreed to acquire Spectra in an all-stock deal worth C$37 Billion. The acquisition would make Enbridge the largest energy infrastructure company in North America. Shareholders of both companies approved the merger that December. When the acquisition concluded on 27 February 2007, Ebel succeeded David Allen Arledge as chairman of the board.

At the end of 2022, Ebel relinquished the chairmanship and was succeeded by Pamela Carter. Concurrently, on 1 January 2023 he was appointed president, succeeding Albert Monaco.

Ebel was married first to Kimberly Van Belle, with whom he had two daughters. The couple later divorced. He secondly married Terri Ebel.
