= Enbridge Pipelines =

Four systems of natural gas pipelines owned by Enbridge

Enbridge Pipelines is a collection of four different systems of natural gas pipelines, all owned by Enbridge. They include the Enbridge Pipelines (AlaTenn) system, the Enbridge Pipelines (MidLa) system, the Enbridge Offshore Pipelines (UTOS) system, and the Enbridge Pipelines (KPC) system.

The AlaTenn system brings gas between Tennessee, Mississippi and Alabama. Its FERC code is 1.

The MidLa brings gas from southern Louisiana to northern Louisiana, through Mississippi. Its FERC code is 15.

The UTOS system gathers gas from the offshore Gulf of Mexico and brings it into Louisiana and Alabama. Its FERC code is 74.

The KPC system brings gas between Oklahoma and northeast Kansas. Its FERC code is 166.

== See also ==
- Enbridge Pipeline System
- Enbridge Northern Gateway Pipelines
- Garden Banks Pipeline
- Nautilus Pipeline
