= Algonquin Gas Transmission Pipeline =

Natural gas pipeline in northeast USA

The Algonquin Gas Transmission Pipeline is a 1,100 miles (1,800 km) long pipeline system, which delivers natural gas to New England. It is connected to the Texas Eastern Pipeline and the Maritimes & Northeast Pipeline. The Algonquin Gas Transmission pipelines transport about 20 billion cubic meters (bcm) of natural gas per annum. It generally receives gas that originated in the Gulf of Mexico, although it also receives gas from an LNG terminal in Massachusetts. The Algonquin Gas Transmission is owned by Enbridge. The pipeline's compressor station in Weymouth, Massachusetts was the subject of numerous protests before it was permitted, including 211 days of sit-ins over three years in the Governor's office. It has had multiple unplanned gas releases since it opened in January 2021, and a state adjudicator recommended reevaluating its permit in 2022.

== See also ==
- Horizon Pipeline
