= Reliance Home Comfort =

Canadian water heater and HVAC company

Reliance Comfort Limited Partnership
- Trade name: Reliance Home Comfort
- Type: Limited partnership
- Predecessor: Union Gas water heater rental division
- Founded: 1999; 27 years ago (as Union Energy)
- Headquarters: Toronto, Ontario, Canada
- Areas served: Ontario and major cities in Western Canada
- Key people: Sean O'Brien (CEO)
- Products: Water heater and HVAC rental, sales and service
- Owners: CK Asset Holdings (75%); CK Infrastructure Holdings (25%)
- Number of employees: 2,700 (2024)
- Website: reliancehomecomfort.com

Reliance Home Comfort is a residential and commercial services company headquartered in Canada primarily focused on rental, sales and maintenance of water heaters, water purification, smart home and heating, ventilation, and air conditioning systems. The company has its largest base of operations in Ontario, but also has offices in western Canada and the United States. As of 2017, it served 1.7 million customer households across Canada.

Reliance is currently controlled by the family of Hong Kong–based Chinese-Canadian businessman Victor Li and his father Li Ka-shing, through two of their holding companies, CK Asset Holdings (75%) and CK Infrastructure Holdings (25%).

== History ==
Reliance has its origins in the storage water heater rental business formerly owned by natural gas utility Union Gas, which served much of Ontario. Reliance's main Ontario competitor, Enercare, has a similar origin as the rental business of Toronto-area utility Consumers' Gas. (The utility operations of both Union and Consumers' are now part of Enbridge.)

Beginning in the mid-20th century, Ontario gas providers such as Consumers' and Union would work with home builders to pre-install gas-powered water heaters, which the providers would agree to subsidize and maintain in exchange for a monthly rental charge on each homeowner's gas bill. This practice of renting water heaters, as opposed to purchasing them, became widespread in Ontario, but is not common elsewhere in Canada.

Due to regulatory changes, Union Gas' unregulated water heater business was split off in 1999 as a sister company named Union Energy. Union Energy was then acquired in 2001 by Epcor for about $160 million, later also acquiring Hydro One's retail rental division Ontario Hydro Energy. The combined operation was then spun off as the UE Waterheater Income Fund in 2003. Beginning in 2005, the company converted its retail operations to the new Reliance Home Comfort brand, as its brand licensing rights from Union Gas and Hydro One were close to expiring. The fund was purchased in 2007 by Alinda Capital Partners for $1.74 billion.

Around the time of the Alinda purchase in 2007, Reliance also purchased security companies Voxcom and Protectron, operating them under the "Reliance Protectron" name until selling the operations to ADT in 2014. ADT Canada was subsequently acquired by Telus in 2019.

Since the sale of Protectron, Reliance has refocused on home maintenance services, including expansion into western Canada. It also acquired competitor National Home Services from Just Energy in 2014. Reliance was then purchased from Alinda by the CK group in 2017 for $2.8 billion.

== Products and services ==
In addition to water heater rentals (and sales in some areas), Reliance sells, rents, installs, and maintains smart home products, generators, heat pumps, furnaces and air conditioners. It also offers maintenance and repair plans for heating and cooling systems, as well as for plumbing and electrical systems.

== Criticism ==
Although not specific to Reliance, the water heater rental business model has been noted as being a poor value for many consumers. The federal Competition Bureau has noted that purchasing a water heater outright "can result in substantial savings over time" compared to rental. However, Reliance and other rental companies argue that because their rentals include maintenance, including replacement parts and labour, they can provide peace of mind for consumers.

The Competition Bureau filed complaints against Reliance and Direct Energy (then-owner of what is now Enercare) in 2012, alleging both companies engaged in anti-competitive behaviour by providing customers limited locations and time windows if they wished to return their rentals, and charging "unwarranted" cancellation fees. Reliance defended its policies, asserting that it was intended to help protect consumers against what it called aggressive tactics by competing rental suppliers. The company settled its part of the complaint in 2014 by agreeing to make it easier for customers to cancel their rentals and paying a $5 million administrative penalty.

Some homeowners have alleged that Reliance has used fallacious collections actions to attempt to extract payments for goods and services not provided.

== Advertising ==
Reliance runs both video and radio ads. Reliance is a partner of the Oakville SC semi-pro soccer team.
