= Union Gas =

Canadian natural gas utility (1911–2019)

- Formerly: The Union Natural Gas Company of Canada, Limited; Union Gas Company of Canada, Limited
- Industry: Gas distribution
- Founded: 19 December 1911
- Defunct: 1 January 2019
- Fate: Merged with Consumers' Gas
- Successor: Enbridge Gas
- Headquarters: 50 Keil Drive North, Chatham, Ontario
- Website: www.uniongas.com

Union Gas Limited was a major Canadian natural gas company based in Ontario. Its distribution arm serviced approximately 1.5 million customers in northern, southwestern and eastern Ontario. Union Gas has been a subsidiary of Enbridge since February 2017, when former parent Spectra Energy merged into Enbridge.

Union Gas Limited and Enbridge Gas Distribution merged under the corporate name Enbridge Gas Inc. on January 1, 2019. Enbridge has since begun to gradually phase out the Union Gas name in favour of its corporate brand.

In addition to natural gas service, Union Gas formerly rented gas-powered water heaters to residential customers; this operation was separated into a sister company, Union Energy, in 1999. Union Energy in 2021 was acquired by CK Asset Holdings (75%) and CK Infrastructure Holdings (25%), which are affiliated with Li Ka-shing, and is now known as Reliance Home Comfort.

== Leadership ==
=== President ===
1. Albert S. Rogers, 1911–1918
2. Frederick E. Ogden, 1918–1928
3. Sydney A. Morse, 1928–1942
4. David P. Rogers, 1942–1963
5. Thomas A. Weir, 1942–1960
6. Fred R. Palin, 1960–1972
7. Bruce Willson, 1972–1974
8. William G. Stewart, 1974–1979
9. W. Darcy McKeough, 1979–1985
10. Stephen T. Bellringer, 1985–
