= Garden Banks Pipeline =

The Garden Banks Pipeline is a 30-inch diameter natural gas transmission pipeline which gathers gas from the offshore Gulf of Mexico and brings it into Enbridge Pipelines UTOS system, which leads into various locations in Louisiana and Texas. One end of the pipeline originates from Cameron, Louisiana, and it spans for 50 miles (80 kilometres). Since 2005, the pipeline itself is 100% owned by Enbridge Offshore (Gas Transmission) L.L.C., a subsidiary of the multinational pipeline company Enbridge, which has the longest pipeline system in North America. Its FERC code is 148. According to the FERC website, the company total cost for pipeline operations in the 2022 fiscal year was $60,318, 949.

Location

The Garden Banks Gas Pipeline is located entirely within the Gulf of Mexico, extending from Garden Banks Block 128 to South Marsh Island Block 76, and intersects with four existing pipelines to move gas onshore. The Garden Banks 72 platform is a base for gathering deepwater production from the Garden Banks area, and acts as a junction platform connecting both the Cameron Highway Oil Pipeline and the Poseidon Oil Pipeline System.

Garden Banks makes up just one component of the 26,000 miles of oil and gas pipelines on the Gulf of Mexico's seafloor. The region is home to one of the most developed oil and gas industry sectors in the world.

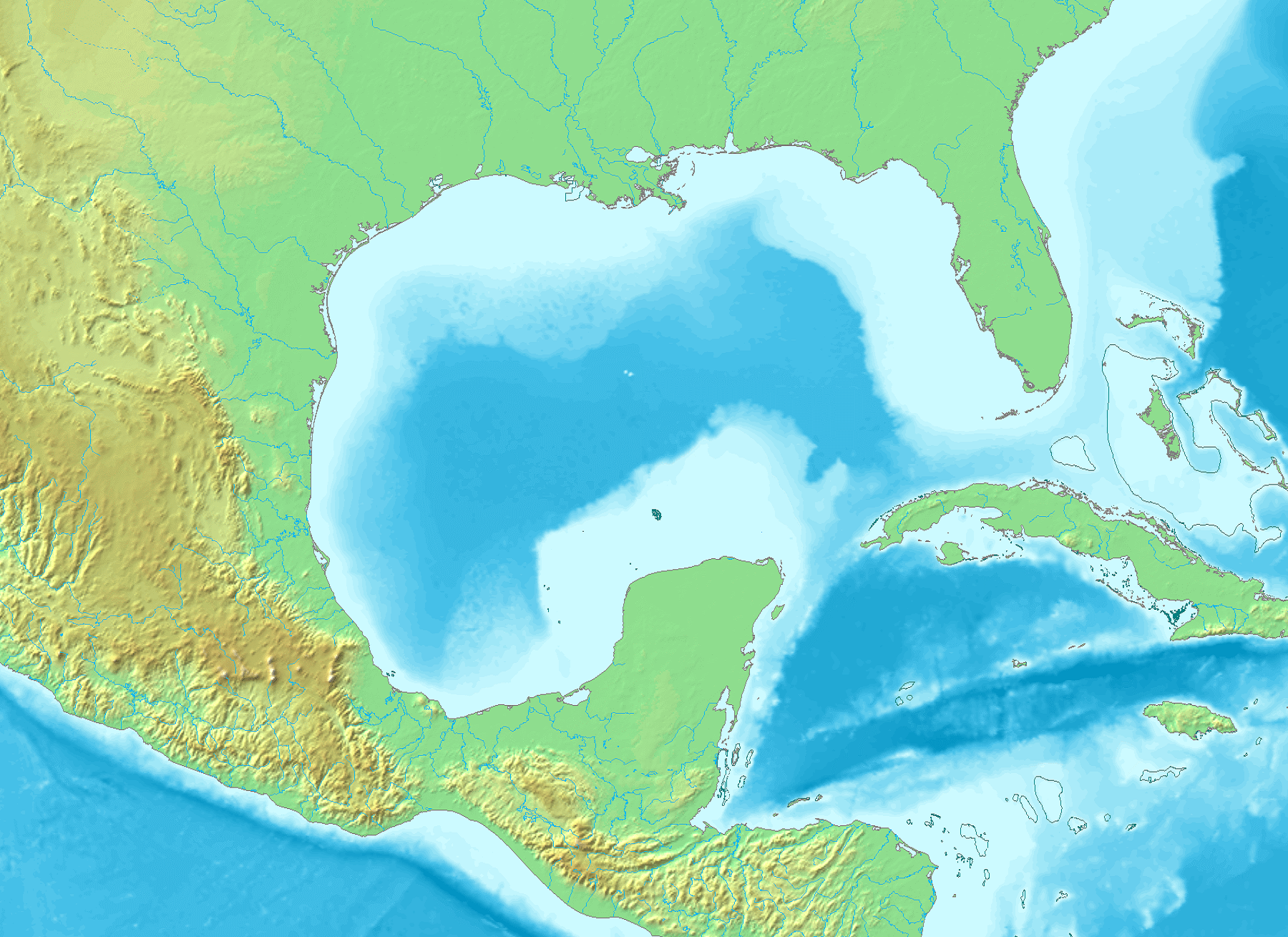
Gulf of Mexico topographic location map

Process

Garden Banks transports natural gas from the Cardamom field [owned by Shell], a reservoir about 360 kilometres (220 miles) southwest of New Orleans, and 4 miles below the sea floor. The gas is drilled via the Auger tension leg platform [located in Garden Banks Block 428], which is owned by the Royal Dutch Shell company. It has a capacity of transporting one billion cubic feet of gas per day.
