= Edison, New Jersey natural gas explosion =

1994 gas pipe explosion in New Jersey, United States

Coordinates: 40°32′54″N 74°23′41″W

- Date: March 23, 1994; 32 years ago
- Location: Edison, New Jersey, U.S.
- Deaths: 1

The Texas Eastern Transmission Corporation Natural Gas Pipeline Explosion and Fire occurred in Edison, New Jersey, on March 23, 1994, where a 36-inch (910 mm) diameter natural gas pipeline broke and exploded into flames next to the Durham Woods apartment complex along New Durham Road at its junction with Interstate 287. The cause of this breakage was given by the NTSB as mechanical damage caused by a backhoe that gouged out 1/4” of steel off the pipe. This was the result of an insurance situation where the owner of a personal vehicle buried their truck to receive insurance monies. This was done on a property adjacent to the complex. The resulting fire destroyed or severely damaged 14 of the apartment buildings. Over 1,500 apartment residents were evacuated, 125 resident apartments, 9 complete buildings, were destroyed and their occupants were left homeless. Miraculously, no one died as a direct result of the explosion.

One death occurred from a heart attack suffered by Sandra Snyder, who was unable to summon emergency workers amid the chaos. Sandra and her husband did not live in the complex. He was not able to reach 911 because there were 40,000 calls to 911 in the first few minutes of the explosion. Sandra had just gotten home from the hospital for a heart situation.

Because the fire occurred so close to the Durham Woods complex, residents in the area also refer to it as the Durham Woods fire or Durham Woods Explosion.

This explosion was the largest gas pipeline explosion of its kind in a highly populated area. Swift action was taken by local authorities as well as the pipeline company who showed complete support for everyone who was effected.

On April 19, 1994, a Pipeline Safety Summit was convened on Capitol Hill where US Senators, led by Senator Bill Bradley (NJ-D), met to create new regulations. The only US citizen called to testify in these proceedings was Tobi (Glovinsky) Bowen who was thrown from her bed, 200 feet from the main blast, and ran for her life.

The result of these proceedings lead to the institution of the national One Call Law, Call Before You Dig, 811 Hotline. Today, April is recognized as National Safe Digging Month.

== NTSB ==
The National Transportation Safety Board (NTSB) investigation found a gouge in the pipe, probably caused by excavation equipment years earlier which, in combination with brittle pipe material and excessive operating pressures, most likely led to the rupture. The NTSB also found fault with the use of manual shut-off valves, which were difficult to reach thus preventing operators from promptly cutting off gas that fueled the fire. NTSB cited that the pipeline had a lack of automatic or remotely-controlled shutoff valves. The NTSB also cited Texas Eastern for its failure to adequately monitor excavation activity on its right of way.

== "One call" system ==
In response to the fire, New Jersey passed regulations requiring excavators to call a telephone hotline prior to digging so that pipeline companies can mark the precise locations of their pipes on the dig site. Prior to 1996, the "one call" concept had become an accepted national practice.

Subsequent to the accident, New Jersey lawmakers continued to call for tougher federal laws on pipeline safety.

== Tenants' lawsuits ==
Following the fire, over 2,000 tenants of Durham Woods and nearby residences sued Texas Eastern and 29 other defendants, including the township, Durham Woods' landlord, and the excavator who cracked the pipeline. By 1997, over half of these suits had been settled, most for $25,000 or less, but with $585,000 going to Sandra Snyder's estate. By 2000, Texas Eastern had paid nearly $65 million in settlements.
