= 1973 Staten Island gas explosion =

Gas explosion in New York City

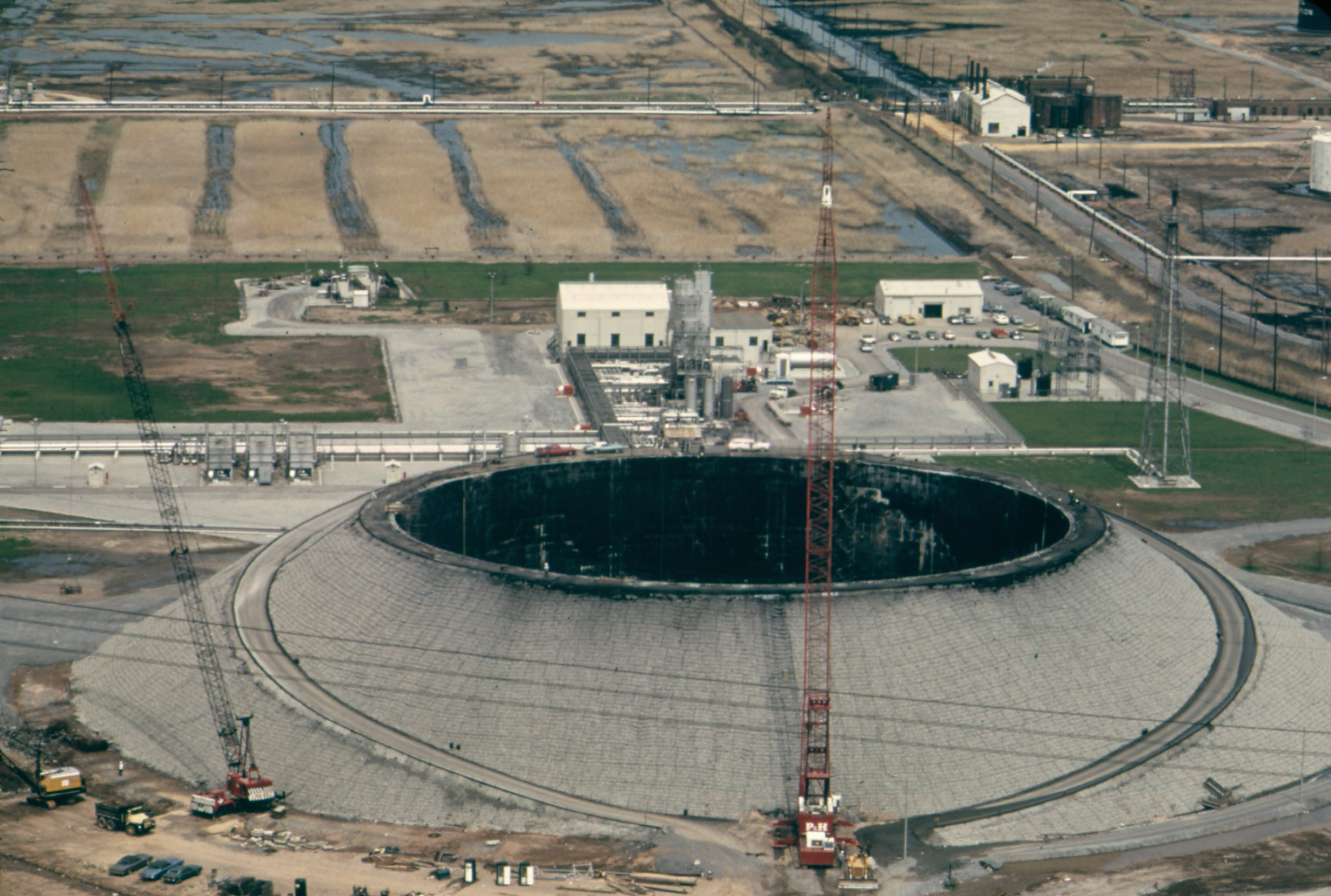
- The gas tank that exploded in 1973
- Date: February 10, 1973; 53 years ago
- Time: 13:00 EST (18:00 UTC)
- Location: Bloomfield, Staten Island, New York, U.S.; 40.618694°N 74.197311°W
- Deaths: 40

On February 10, 1973, a gas explosion occurred inside a Texas Eastern Transmission Pipeline tank storing liquefied natural gas in the Bloomfield neighborhood of Staten Island, New York City, while 42 workers were cleaning the tank. The tank had supposedly been completely drained ten months earlier, but ignition occurred, causing a plume of combusting gas to rise. Two workers near the top felt the heat and rushed to the safety of scaffolding outside, while the other 40 workers died as the concrete cap on the tank rose 20 to 30 feet (6.1 to 9.1 m) in the air and then came crashing back down, crushing them.

The incident was the worst industrial accident in Staten Island's history. It resulted in a moratorium on liquefied natural gas storage facilities in New York state.

== Background ==
At the time of the incident, Rossville, Bloomfield, and other Staten Island neighborhoods had numerous liquefied natural gas storage tanks. In 1970, Distrigas had announced plans to build nine 37,800,000-US-gallon (143,000,000 L; 31,500,000 imp gal) gas tanks in Rossville, of which two were built. Opposition to such tanks developed slowly, but by 1971, many Staten Island residents were opposed to the construction of gas tanks. Gene and Edwina Cosgriff formed the group Bring Legal Action to Stop the Tanks (BLAST) to protest the tanks' construction after hearing about the theoretical negative effects of an oil spill within the nearby Arthur Kill waterway. Patrick A. Mercurio, BLAST's chairman, later said that according to scientists, "an explosion of a tank filled with gas would extend to an area eight miles by one mile—the equivalent of a small nuclear explosion".

The particular gas tank that exploded had a capacity of 660,000 barrels, and was 108 feet (33 m) tall with a diameter of 272 feet (83 m). The tank was owned by Texas Eastern Transmission Pipeline (TETCo) and had supposedly been drained in April 1972. However, the tank had a polyurethane lining, which enabled gas to be trapped inside the lining even after the liquid had been drained. At the time of the explosion, the men were sealing cracks in the plastic lining of the tank. The roof of the tank was designed to collapse in the event of an explosion. TETCo officials had been "fanatical about safety", and even on the day before the explosion, February 9, 1973, TETCo officials called Staten Island residents "hysterical" for raising concerns about the danger of storing gas near residential areas.

== Incident ==
The explosion occurred on February 10, 1973, at about 1 p.m. EST. Jose Lema and Joseph Pecora, two survivors of the explosion, said that just before the explosion occurred, the space had heated up and a low "woof" could be heard from the ceiling. Pecora tapped Lema on the shoulder and the two workers escaped out of the stairway. Lema reported a loud explosion after the two men had escaped through an opening in the dome, though Pecora did not remember any sound. Another worker, John Carroll, had been on the roof and ran down the embankment around the tank, escaping with minor injuries.

Hundreds of first responders went to the site, including New York City Fire Department rescue companies 1 and 2, and found the bodies 12 hours after the explosion. Rescuers developed a system to retrieve the corpses. Rescue and truck companies worked in shifts to recover the bodies, with one rescue company being assisted by several truck companies at any given time. Most of the bodies were retrieved quickly, with 28 victims having been extricated by February 12. The recovery process was stymied by the presence of debris on the site, including granite slabs from the roof of the tank. The last body was not retrieved until February 22. A few bodies were identified by artifacts such as "rings, watches, and bracelets". Some sources claimed that 43 workers were killed, possibly based on initial media reports that counted Lema, Pecora, and Carroll, though the final death toll was 40.

== Aftermath ==
The incident was the deadliest industrial accident in Staten Island's history. Investigators from the New York City Fire Department and from the United States Department of Labor found that natural gas pockets had been found both in the tank itself and in surrounding areas. Massachusetts Institute of Technology mechanical-engineering professor James A. Fay said that TETCo's storage of liquefied natural gas and naphtha, both volatile substances, was very dangerous. Experts from the gas industry disputed the fact that the explosion could have been caused by gas, saying "a construction accident" was the cause of the explosion. In response to TETCo's claim that the liner was not flammable, scientists at the United States Bureau of Mines built a model of the tank and set it on fire, observing that the model had burned in a similar manner to the real tank. After investigators suggested that the tank may have been sabotaged, two TETCo workers confessed to breaking the lining to extend the tenure of their jobs, and were fired.

Politicians quickly took regulatory action. The New York City Council passed a bill imploring the New York City Department of City Planning to prohibit any gas storage tanks from being constructed. Mayor John Lindsay signed a bill on March 25 that prevented the New York City Board of Standards and Appeals from granting zoning variances for tanks, meaning that they could not be larger than 500,000 US gallons (1,900,000 L; 420,000 imp gal). The explosion resulted in a moratorium on liquefied natural gas storage facilities in New York state. The construction of two under-construction tanks in Rossville was subsequently abandoned. The Public Service Electric and Gas Company attempted to store natural gas in the two tanks, but dropped these plans in 1984 due to opposition. The statewide ban was repealed in January 2015, except within New York City, where it remained active.

Numerous lawsuits were filed by the estates of the victims, the first having been filed in December 1973. TETCo was charged with 40 counts of negligent homicide in 1974. Two years later, courts reached settlements of a combined $11 million in 33 civil lawsuits related to the explosion. The tank's site was cleared in 1993 and bought by NASCAR in 2004; since then, it has lain unused.
