= Spectra Energy =

American energy company

Spectra Energy Corporation
- Formerly: Gas SpinCo. Inc. (July–November 2006)
- Company type: Public
- Traded as: NYSE: SE
- Industry: Oil & Gas Pipelines
- Founded: July 28, 2006
- Defunct: February 27, 2017
- Fate: Acquired by into Enbridge
- Headquarters: Houston, Texas
- Number of employees: 5,700 (2011)
- Website: www.spectraenergy.com

Spectra Energy Corp, headquartered in Houston, Texas, operated in three key areas of the natural gas industry: transmission and storage, distribution, and gathering and processing. Spectra was formed in late 2006 from the spin-off from Duke Energy. Spectra owned the Texas Eastern Pipeline (TETCo), a major natural gas pipeline which brings gas from the Gulf of Mexico coast in Texas to the New York City area, which was one of the largest pipeline systems in the United States. Spectra also operated three oil pipelines. In February 2017, Spectra Energy merged into the Canadian company Enbridge.

== History ==
In 2002, Duke Energy acquired Westcoast Energy, a Canadian corporation, which owned Chatham, Ontario-based Union Gas, regulated under the 1998 Ontario Energy Board Act.

On December 29, 2006 Standard & Poor's added Spectra Energy Corp. to its S&P 500 Index, replacing Parametric Technology Corp. (Nasdaq: PMTC), a software company, which then moved to the S&P MidCap 400 list instead. Spectra began trading on the New York Stock Exchange under the ticker symbol SE.

On January 3, 2007, Duke Energy completed the spin-off of its natural gas business, including Westcoast Energy and Union Gas, to form Spectra Energy. Duke Energy shareholders received 1 share of Spectra Energy for every 2 shares of Duke Energy.

By early August 2007, the S&P 500 breached its first 10% correction in over four years, and the shares of Spectra Energy Corp. sunk to their lowest point since trading had begun in December 2006, after the company announced that second quarter earnings had dropped 39 percent.

In 2009, the company's financial performance had improved and had a total shareholder return of 38.3 percent.

In 2011, Spectra Energy achieved record net income and surpassed its earnings target by more than 7 percent. And, in 2011, the company increased its annual dividend to $1.12, representing a nearly 8 percent increase.

=== Merger with Enbridge ===
Canadian pipeline operator Enbridge Inc. on September 6, 2016, agreed to buy Spectra Energy in an all-stock deal valued at about $28 billion.

== Environmental record ==
For 2010, Spectra Energy was listed in the Newsweek green rankings, with a ranking of 280 out of the 500 largest publicly traded corporations in America. The listing was based on environmental impacts, green policies, and a reputation survey.

Despite those high rankings, Spectra Energy's environmental record is not without incidents or government imposed penalties. Since 2006, the Pipeline and Hazardous Materials Safety Administration reports twenty-five separate incidents at Spectra's Texas Eastern Transmission Pipeline ranging from equipment failure to incorrect operations to pipe corrosion. Combined, those incidents caused $12,036,495 in property damage, and the US federal government fined Spectra a total of $403,100 over that period. The most recent incident for that pipeline occurred on May 31, 2015, when a piece of the pipeline in the Arkansas River near Little Rock, Arkansas ruptured. Similarly the US federal government has imposed $154,700 in penalties since 2007 at Spectra's Algonquin Gas Transmission Pipeline for a single incident from 2010. An incident in 2010 from Spectra's Southeast Supply Header Pipeline did $561,563 in property damage, which led to it being fined a total of $201,300 by the US federal government.

Spectra Energy may be considered the single largest private-sector source of greenhouse gases in British Columbia. Since it co-owned DCP Midstream Partners with ConocoPhillips, Spectra Energy was reported in 2005 to emit 19,746 tons of nitrogen oxides and 9,286 tons of volatile organic compounds per year. As of August 2015, Canada's National Energy Board has fined Spectra's subsidiary Westcoast Energy a total of $122,300 for violations.

== Current natural gas pipelines ==
- Algonquin Gas Transmission Pipeline
- BC Pipeline, a pipeline running through British Columbia, Canada.
- Big Sandy Pipeline, a pipeline in eastern Kentucky.
- Union Gas' Dawn to Parkway Transmission Pipeline in southwestern Ontario, Canada.
- East Tennessee Natural Gas Pipeline
- Gulfstream Natural Gas Pipeline
- Maritimes & Northeast Pipeline
- Ohio Pipeline Energy Network (OPEN), a pipeline to be completed in late 2015.
- Ozark Gas Transmission Pipeline, a pipeline running through Oklahoma, Arkansas, and Missouri.
- Salem Lateral Pipeline, a pipeline in Salem, Massachusetts that is under construction and was scheduled to be completed by November 2016.
- Southeast Supply Header Pipeline, a pipeline running through Louisiana, Mississippi, and Alabama.
- Texas Eastern Transmission Pipeline
- The Union Gas Pipeline System, a pipeline system in Ontario through Spectra Energy's subsidiary Union Gas.

== Proposed natural gas pipelines ==
- PennEast Pipeline, a pipeline to run through New Jersey and Pennsylvania.
- NEXUS Gas Transmission Pipeline, a pipeline to run through Illinois, Michigan, Ohio, and Ontario.
- Sabal Trail Transmission Pipeline, a pipeline to run from central Alabama through southwest Georgia to Orange County, Florida. A minority stake in the venture is owned by NextEra Energy and Duke Energy.

== Current oil pipelines ==
- Express Pipeline, a pipeline running from Hardisty, Alberta, Canada to Casper, Wyoming.
- Platte Pipeline, a pipeline running from Casper, Wyoming to Wood River, Illinois.
- Sand Hills and Southern Hills Pipeline, a pipeline owned by DCP Midstream, Phillips 66, and Spectra Energy equally.
