= Sabal Trail Transmission Pipeline =

Sabal Trail Transmission Pipeline is a natural gas pipeline that runs from central Alabama through southwest Georgia to Orange County, Florida. A minority stake in the venture is owned by NextEra Energy and Duke Energy. The pipeline has been being planned since before 2011. In July 2013 it was announced that Florida Power & Light Company (FPL) jointly awarded its parent corporation, NextEra Energy and Spectra Energy the bid to build the pipeline. In May 2015, Duke Energy bought an interest in the venture. Construction began in September 2016. The pipeline is currently scheduled to be in service by June 2017.

== Environmental concerns and federal agency permission ==
The construction of the pipeline has drawn concern from the communities through which it is planned to be built. Protests in Albany, Georgia and Valdosta, Georgia have occurred in response to the plans to build the pipelines. The threat of eminent domain and the environmental impact are among the concerns that have been voiced by citizens.

In late October 2015, the United States Environmental Protection Agency recommended to Federal Energy Regulatory Commission that the pipeline be rerouted away from the Floridan aquifer because of the karst geology that is prone to sinkholes and also contains wetlands.

Environmental concerns have also been raised regarding threats to endangered species habitat along the route including crocodile, manatee and sea turtle breeding and nesting grounds. Others including Sanford Bishop, Hank Johnson, David Scott and John Lewis have voiced concern over the construction of a proposed compressor station near an already disadvantaged African American community in Albany, Georgia.

Despite the recommendations of Environmental Protection Agency, the Federal Energy Regulatory Commission approved the pipeline's route in February 2016. In August 2016, the Army Corps of Engineers approved the route through North Florida. Some citizens from the areas of the route continued to voice concerns about the environmental impact the pipeline would have the environment after it was approved by the various governmental agencies.

The federal permits require the companies constructing the pipeline to engage in mitigation banking.

=== Protests ===
The construction of the Sabal Trail resulted in extensive protests from environmentalists. On November 12, 2016, fourteen protesters were arrested at a pipeline construction site in Gilchrist County, Florida after one protester locked himself to truck on site and the others obstructed its path. They had been inspired by the Dakota Access Pipeline protests and used similar protest signage. In February 2017, two protestors locked themselves inside a section of the pipeline, citing the danger to people and the environment which would result from a pipeline leak.

On February 26, 2017 an apparent protester was seen firing a high powered rifle at the pipeline construction site. The man fled and was chased by police until he crashed and was killed by a deputy after he tried to engage police in a gunfight

== Construction ==
In September 2016, construction began on the pipeline.

In late October 2016, drilling mud seepage began leaking into the Withlacoochee River at construction along the border of Brooks County, Georgia and Lowndes County, Georgia from a pilot hole that had been drilled underneath the river in preparation for the horizontal directional drilling hole. After the leakage was discovered, the Sabal Company installed containment booms at the site and posted a vacuum truck to capture the mud seepage. The spill prompted protests from concerned local citizens on November 16, 2016.

As part of the company's biweekly report for the week ending on November 27 to the Federal Energy Regulatory Commission, it was reported that a sinkhole had developed 165 feet (50 m) southeast of the horizontal directional drilling (HDD) hole exit point at the work site near the Withlacoochee River. The sinkhole had been identified on November 5 by workers in the field.

== Owners ==
- Spectra Energy
- NextEra Energy
- Duke Energy (7.5%)

== See also ==
- Spectra Energy
