= Consumers' Gas Company =

Canadian gas utility (1848–2019)

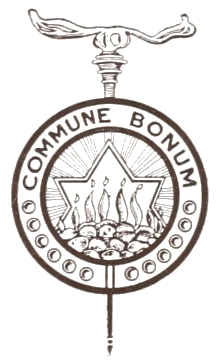
- Industry: Gas distribution
- Founded: 23 March 1848
- Defunct: 1 January 2019
- Fate: Merged with Union Gas
- Successor: Enbridge Gas
- Headquarters: Consumers' Gas Building, Toronto, Ontario

The Consumers' Gas Company was a Canadian gas distribution utility that existed from 1848 to 2019. The company was founded as the Consumers' Gas Company of Toronto and was the city's main gas supplier. In 1957, reflecting its expansion beyond the city, "Toronto" was removed from its name. For the entirety of its history, Consumers' was Canada's largest gas distribution company.

In 1994, the Interprovincial Pipe Line Company (now Enbridge) acquired an 85 per cent stake in Consumers', and in 1996 bought the remainder of the company. In 1998, Consumers' was renamed Enbridge Consumers Gas, and in 2002 became Enbridge Gas Distribution Inc. On 1 January 2019, the company merged with Union Gas to form Enbridge Gas Inc.

== History ==
The company originally manufactured gas from coal. This ended in 1954 when manufactured gas was replaced by natural gas shipped by pipeline from western Canada.

In January 1980, it was announced that Consumers' Gas intended a friendly takeover of the distiller Hiram Walker-Gooderham & Worts Limited. On 9 April 1980, Consumers' and Walker completed their merger. A new holding company, Hiram Walker-Consumers Home Ltd. was created and would operate three wholly owned subsidiaries: Hiram Walker-Gooderham & Worts, Consumers' Gas, and Home Oil. In February 1981, shareholders approved that the holding company be renamed Hiram Walker Resources Limited. In July 1981, HWR announced that it would sell between 10 and 15 percent of Consumers.' By the end of 1985, it had reduced its holdings to 83.5 per cent.

In December 1990, British Gas purchased Consumers' outright. The company paid C$915 million for the 82 per cent stake held by GW Utilities, and then paid $34 a share for the remaining 18 per cent of the company. For the foreign takeover to proceed, Investment Canada ruled that by the end of 1992, British Gas would have to sell off 15 per cent of the company to Canadians. British Gas made this sale in February 1992 for $170 million, thus reducing its holdings to 85 per cent.

In November 1993, the Interprovincial Pipe Line Company struck a tentative deal to purchase for C$1.2 billion the 85 per cent stake in Consumers' held by British Gas. The deal was approved by the Ontario government in June 1994. In January 1996, Interprovincial applied to the Ontario government to remove the requirement for a 15 per cent public float of common shares in Consumers'. The application was approved that summer, and in October, Interprovincial offered the shareholders of Consumers' $24.00 per share, or cash plus shares in IPL energy. The deal was completed on 11 December.

== Leadership ==
=== President ===
1. Charles A. Berczy, 1847–1856
2. Ezekiel F. Whittemore, 1856–1859
3. Richard Yates, 1858–1867
4. Edward H. Rutherford, 1867–1874
5. James Austin, 1874–1897
6. Larratt W. Smith, 1897–1905
7. George R. R. Cockburn, 1905–1906
8. John L. Blaikie, 1906–1912
9. Albert William Austin, 1912–1934
10. Arthur Hewitt, 1934–1936
11. Thomas Bradshaw, 1936–1939
12. Arthur L. Bishop, 1939–1960
13. Oakah L. Jones, 1960–1971
14. Joseph C. McCarthy, 1971–1975
15. G. Edward Creber, 1975–1978
16. J. Douglas Gibson, 1978–1979
17. William P. Wilder, 1979–1981
18. Robert W. Martin, 1981–1992
19. Charles F. Safrance, 1992–1994
20. Ronald D. Munkley, 1994–1997
21. Rudy G. Riedl, 1997–2001

=== Chairman of the Board ===
1. Arthur L. Bishop, 1960–1968
2. Oakah L. Jones, 1968–1973
3. J. Douglas Gibson, 1973–1980
4. H. Clifford Hatch, 1980–1981
5. William P. Wilder, 1981–1987
6. John Black Aird, 1987–1991
7. Robert S. K. Welch, 1991–1994

== Company histories ==
- Edward J. Tucker. Consumers' Gas Company of Toronto: 75th Birthday, 1848-1923. Consumers' Gas Company of Toronto, 1923.
- Edward Phillips. First Century of Consumers' Gas. Consumers' Gas Company, 1948.
- Consumers' Gas Company. A Tradition of Service: The Consumers Gas Story. Consumers' Gas Company Limited, 1993.

== Sources ==
- Gas Industry. Periodicals Publishing Company. 1918.
