= Nautilus Pipeline =

Nautilus Pipeline is a natural gas pipeline which gathers natural gas in the offshore Gulf of Mexico and brings it into Louisiana. It is owned by Enbridge. Its FERC code is 159.
