= Texas Eastern Transmission Pipeline =

Texas Eastern Pipeline (TETCo) is a major natural gas pipeline which brings gas from the Gulf of Mexico coast in Texas and Louisiana up through Mississippi, Arkansas, Tennessee, Missouri, Kentucky, Illinois, Indiana, Ohio, and Pennsylvania to deliver gas in the New York City area. It is one of the largest pipeline systems in the United States. It is owned by Enbridge. Its FERC code is 17.

This pipeline was built as Big Inch by War Emergency Pipelines (WEP), a consortium of Standard Oil Company of New Jersey, Texas Pipe Line Company, Cities Service, Socony-Vacuum Oil, Gulf Oil, Consolidated Oil, Shell Oil, Atlantic Refining, Tidewater Associated Oil, Sun Oil, and Pan American Petroleum and Transport Company.

== Incidents ==
On June 10, 2021, there was a 20% pressure reduction on part of its 30-inch diameter system, precisely on lines 10 and 15

On May 5, 2020, there was an explosion on Line 10 of its system in Fleming County, Kentucky. There were no injuries reported.

On August 1, 2019, a section of the pipeline in Lincoln County, Kentucky ruptured and exploded causing the death of one person and injuring five others.

On January 21, 2019, two people were injured, and two structures damaged, when a Texas Eastern Transmission Pipeline line exploded and burned, in Noble County, Ohio

On April 29, 2016, a 30-inch Texas Eastern/Spectra Energy pipeline exploded, injuring one man, destroying his home, and damaging several others. The incident was in Salem Township, Pennsylvania. The explosion was caused by corrosion so aggressive that it is challenging industry models for how quickly a small anomaly can grow.

On March 23, 1994, during the Edison, New Jersey, natural gas explosion, a 36 inch diameter section of pipeline exploded, destroying numerous apartments nearby.

On February 21, 1986, near Lancaster, Kentucky, a 30-inch diameter Texas Eastern Transmission Pipeline gas pipeline ruptured due to corrosion. Three people had serious burns, and five others had lesser injuries. External corrosion made worse by difficulties of cathodic protection in rocky soil was the cause. The pipe was manufactured in 1957.

On February 10, 1973, during a cleaning operation, a gas tank exploded in Bloomfield, Staten Island, killing 40 workers.
