= Viking, Minnesota =

City in Minnesota, United States

- City
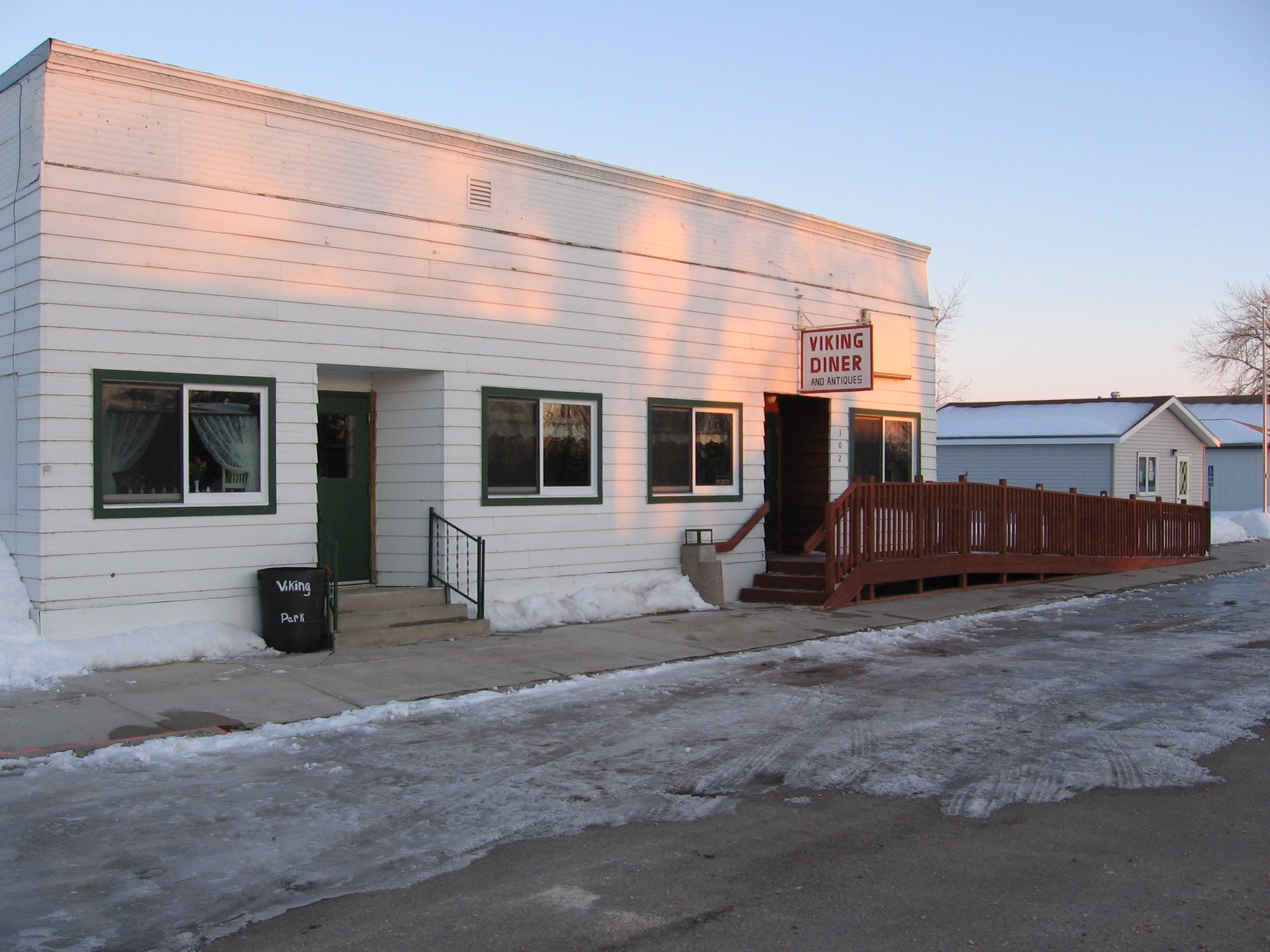
- Viking Diner and Antiques in Viking

- Location of Viking, Minnesota
- Coordinates: 48°13′12″N 96°24′24″W
- Country: United States
- State: Minnesota
- County: Marshall
- Organized: 1884
- Incorporated: April 12, 1921

Government
  - Mayor: Michael Hestekind

Area
  - Total: 0.515 sq mi (1.335 km^{2})
  - Land: 0.515 sq mi (1.335 km^{2})
  - Water: 0 sq mi (0.000 km^{2})
- Elevation: 1,070 ft (326 m)

Population (2020)
  - Total: 79
  - Estimate (2022): 79
  - Density: 153.2/sq mi (59.17/km^{2})
- Time zone: UTC−6 (Central (CST))
  - Summer (DST): UTC−5 (CDT)
- ZIP Code: 56760
- Area code: 218
- FIPS code: 27-67090
- GNIS feature ID: 0653655
- Sales tax: 6.875%

Viking is a city in Marshall County, Minnesota, United States. The population was 79 at the 2020 census.

== History ==
A post office called Viking has been in operation since 1890. The city was organized in 1884, and was named by Rev. Hans P. Hansen, a Norwegian Lutheran pastor in Warren, after the Vikings.

== Geography ==
According to the United States Census Bureau, the city has a total area of 0.516 square miles (1.34 km^{2}), all land.

== Demographics ==
Historical population
Census	Pop.	Note	%±
1930	133		—
1940	146		9.8%
1950	130		−11.0%
1960	128		−1.5%
1970	118		−7.8%
1980	129		9.3%
1990	103		−20.2%
2000	92		−10.7%
2010	104		13.0%
2020	79		−24.0%
2022 (est.)	79		0.0%
U.S. Decennial Census; 2020 Census

=== 2010 census ===
As of the 2010 census, there were 104 people, 43 households, and 31 families living in the city. The population density was 203.9 inhabitants per square mile (78.7/km^{2}). There were 46 housing units at an average density of 90.2 per square mile (34.8/km^{2}). The racial makeup of the city was 96.2% White and 3.8% from two or more races. Hispanic or Latino of any race were 1.9% of the population.

There were 43 households, of which 37.2% had children under the age of 18 living with them, 48.8% were married couples living together, 20.9% had a female householder with no husband present, 2.3% had a male householder with no wife present, and 27.9% were non-families. 25.6% of all households were made up of individuals, and 4.7% had someone living alone who was 65 years of age or older. The average household size was 2.42 and the average family size was 2.81.

The median age in the city was 42 years. 30.8% of residents were under the age of 18; 1.9% were between the ages of 18 and 24; 23% were from 25 to 44; 28.8% were from 45 to 64; and 15.4% were 65 years of age or older. The gender makeup of the city was 43.3% male and 56.7% female.

=== 2000 census ===
As of the 2000 census, there were 92 people, 39 households, and 26 families living in the city. The population density was 180.3 inhabitants per square mile (69.6/km^{2}). There were 44 housing units at an average density of 86.2 per square mile (33.3/km^{2}). The racial makeup of the city was 100.00% White. Hispanic or Latino of any race were 1.09% of the population.

There were 39 households, out of which 28.2% had children under the age of 18 living with them, 59.0% were married couples living together, 7.7% had a female householder with no husband present, and 30.8% were non-families. 30.8% of all households were made up of individuals, and 17.9% had someone living alone who was 65 years of age or older. The average household size was 2.36 and the average family size was 2.96.

In the city, the population was spread out, with 28.3% under the age of 18, 4.3% from 18 to 24, 22.8% from 25 to 44, 21.7% from 45 to 64, and 22.8% who were 65 years of age or older. The median age was 42 years. For every 100 females, there were 87.8 males. For every 100 females age 18 and over, there were 100.0 males.

The median income for a household in the city was $28,750, and the median income for a family was $36,250. Males had a median income of $36,250 versus $26,250 for females. The per capita income for the city was $11,812. There were 7.7% of families and 14.3% of the population living below the poverty line, including 21.2% of under eighteens and none of those over 64.

== Gallery ==
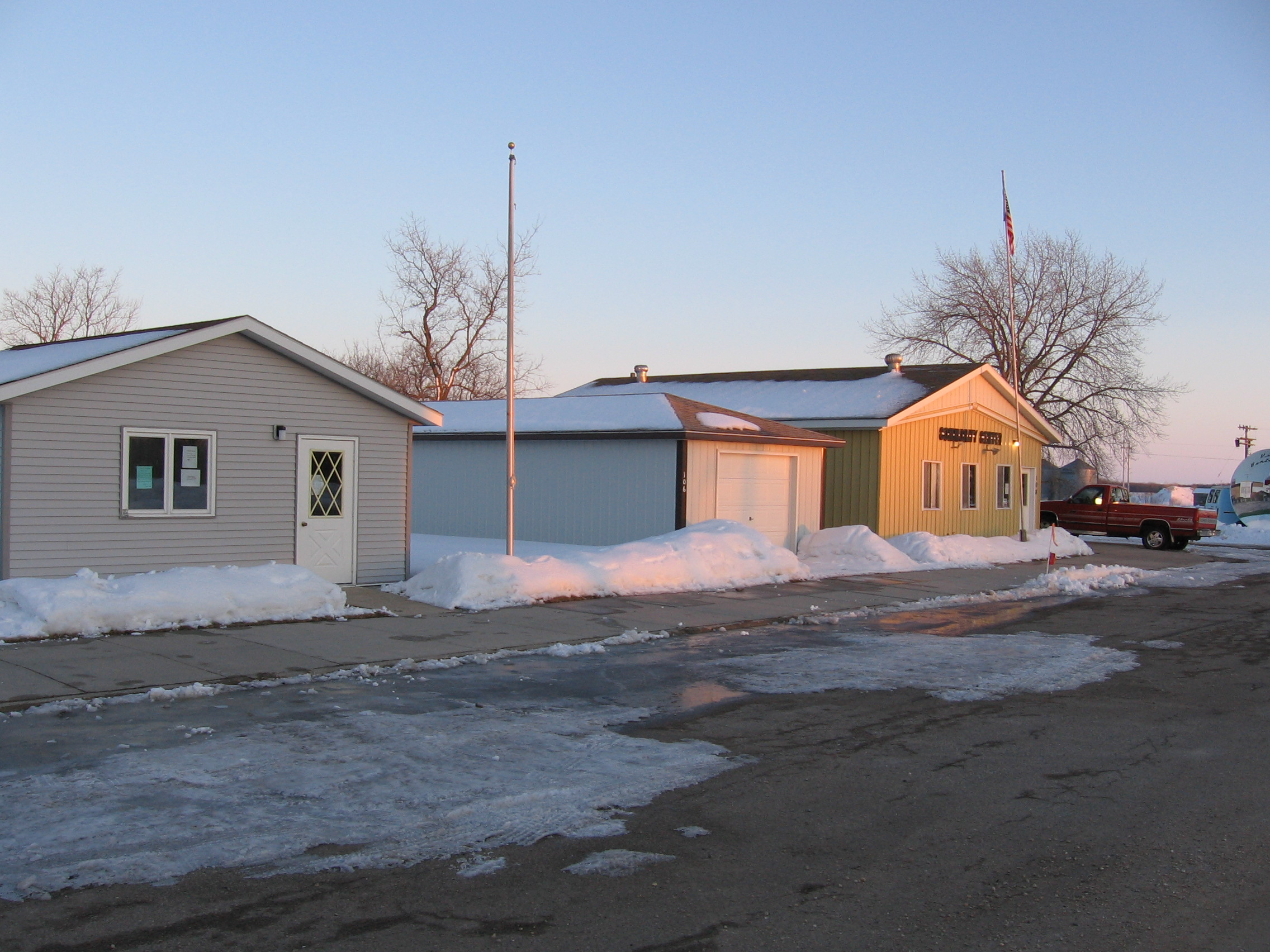
Community Center

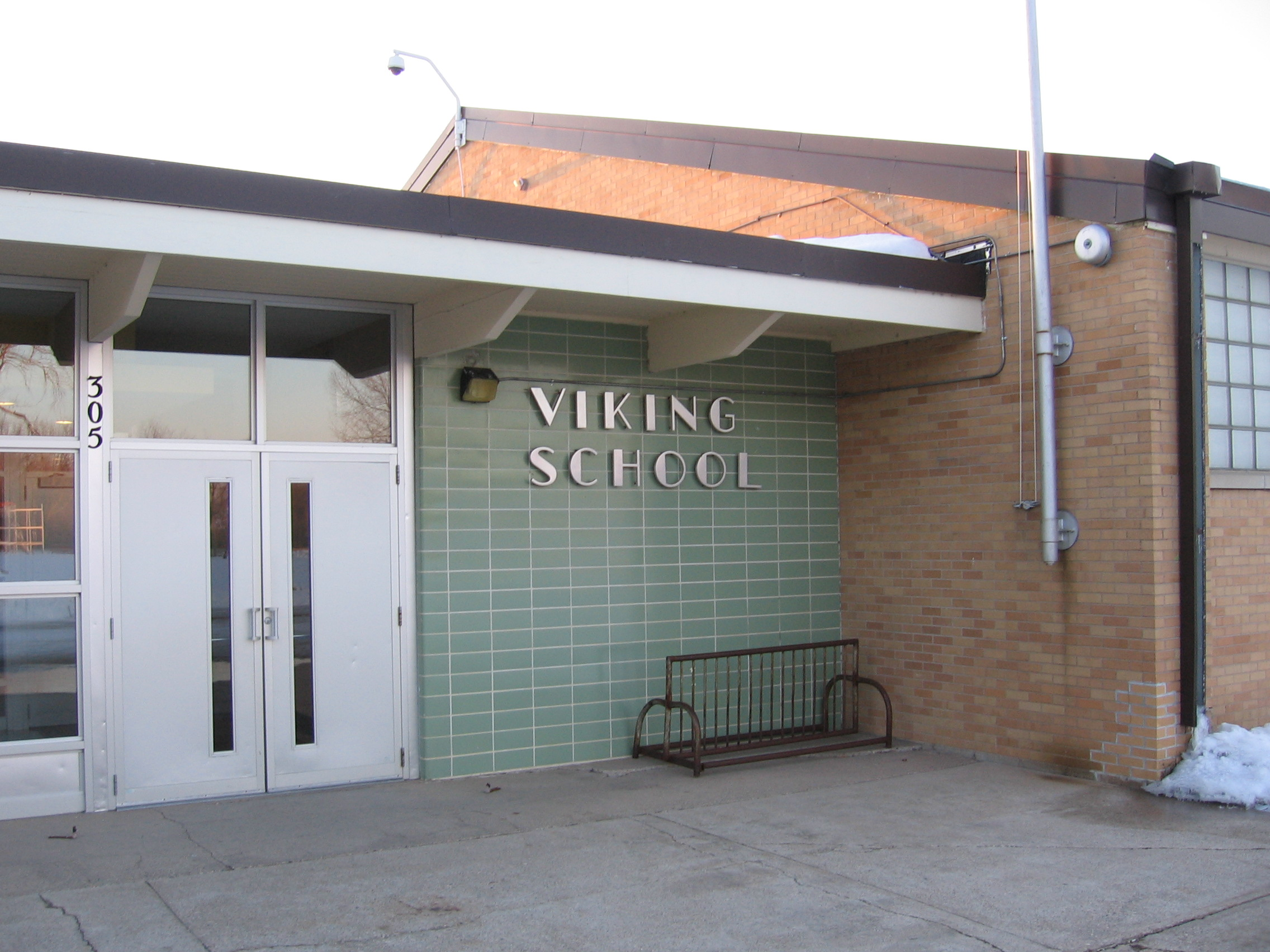
Viking School

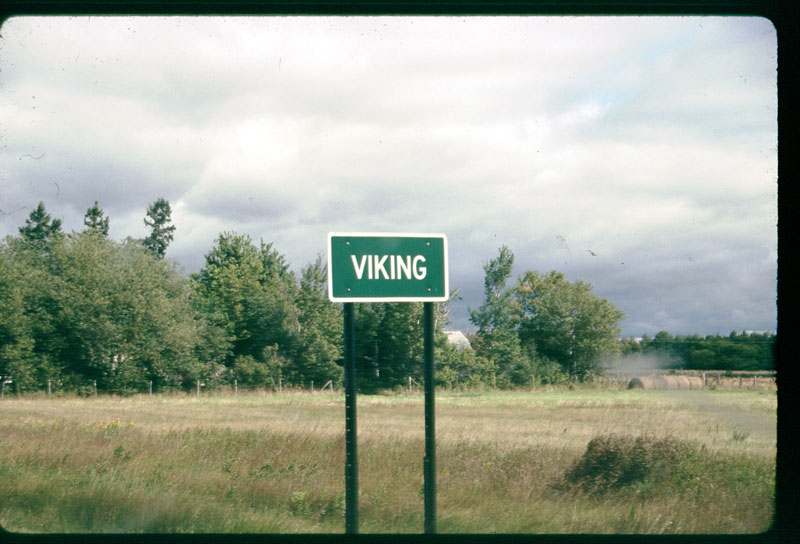
Hwy sign
