= In Good Company (Canadian Chamber Choir album) =

Studio album by Canadian Chamber Choir
- Released: May 18, 2010
- Recorded: Buhler Hall, Gretna, Manitoba
- Genre: Classical
- Length: 53:48
- Label: Polar Bear
- Producer: Julia Davids, Dan Donahue

In Good Company is the Canadian Chamber Choir's first studio album. It was produced and released on May 18, 2010 under the artistic direction of Julia Davids. It was recorded in August 2009 in Gretna, Manitoba at Buhler Hall while in residence at the Mennonite Collegiate Institute. The album features songs by Canadian composers, including Eleanor Daley, Allan Rae, Jocelyn Morlock, Lionel Daunais, and Jeffrey Ryan. Additionally composer Jeff Enns was commissioned to create the song At Sunset based on the poem of the same name by Pauline Johnson. The voices of the 21 person choir come from singers that live across Canada. Special guests on the recording are mezzo-soprano Christianne Rushton, pianist Joel Tranquilla and cellist Se Hee Kim.

== Choristers ==
=== Soprano ===
- Michelle Bourque (QC)
- Dawn Coulter (AB)
- Nicole Jordan (NS)
- Catherine Lippitt (AB)
- Sarah Morrison (ON)
- Christina Murray (NS)

=== Alto ===
- Deborah Buck (SK)
- Sonja Dennis (ON)
- Karla Ferguson (MB)
- Sandy Jasper (MB)
- Naomi Russell (MB)

=== Tenor ===
- Ryan Billington (NS)
- Chris Bowman (NS)
- Tristan Cleveland-Thompson (NS)
- Bill Hamm (AB)
- Simon Hardman (ON)

=== Bass ===
- Jeff Enns (ON)
- Cy Giacomin (NS)
- Matt Pauls (ON)
- Joel Tranquilla (NB)
- Jereme Wall (MB)

== Track listing ==
No.	Title	Composer	Length
1.	"Litany"	Jeff Enns	2:41
2.	"Dona Nobis Pacem TTBB"	Dylan Bell	4:06
3.	"Chantez à l'Éternel"	Tawnie Olson	4:04
4.	"Mvt #5 Allegro from Keltic Suite"	Allan Rae	4:00
5.	"Exaudi with cellist SeHee Kim"	Jocelyn Morlock	7:47
6.	"Wilt Thou Forgive"	Mark Sirett	2:34
7.	"At Sunset with mezzo-soprano Christianne Rushton"	Jeff Enns	10:34
8.	"Angeline on Ossabow with cellist SeHee Kim"	Jeffrey Ryan	4:37
9.	"After Storm"	Jeffrey Ryan	3:51
10.	"Exultate Deo"	Robin King	2:21
11.	"Ubi Caritas SSAA"	Eleanor Daley	4:29
12.	"Figures De Danse, Pas Grave with pianist Joel Tranquilla"	Lionel Daunais	1:13
13.	"Figures De Danse, Jetés-battus with pianist Joel Tranquilla"	Lionel Daunais	1:35
14.	"Figures De Danse, Grand écart with pianist Joel Tranquilla"	Lionel Daunais	0:37
15.	"Figures De Danse, Adagio with pianist Joel Tranquilla"	Lionel Daunais	0:29
16.	"Figures De Danse, Bayadère with pianist Joel Tranquilla"	Lionel Daunais	3:03
17.	"Figures De Danse, Maryse and partner with pianist Joel Tranquilla"	Lionel Daunais	2:16
18.	"The Parting Glass"	arr. Mark Sirett	2:55
