= Canadian Chamber Choir =

The Canadian Chamber Choir (Choeur de chambre du Canada)'s mission is to build community through choral singing. The CCC is a national ensemble that provides a professional choral environment for Canadian singers, conductors, and composers, and travels across Canada to promote Canadian choral music. Under the artistic direction of Julia Davids, the CCC convenes in different regions of Canada twice a year, offering concerts and mentoring choral practitioners of all ages and stages.

== Projects ==
The CCC puts on two or three projects each year. Each project brings together 17 singers, an artistic director, and an accompanist from across Canada. Projects are usually seven to ten days in length and are put on in different regions in Canada. Singers receive their music in the mail and learn it prior to arrival at the project. Upon arrival in the host city, they spend three to four days in rehearsal, hosted by a local school, choir, or community group. The CCC then travels to a few nearby towns on a tour, giving a combination of concerts and workshops throughout the province. Education is at the heart of the mandate of the CCC, and this model allows an increasing number of communities and singers access to high-caliber choral music.

Projects could not be carried out without the generous support of sponsors. The Canadian Chamber Choir is a registered charity.

== History ==
The CCC was formed in July 1999 by a group of Canadian musicians. The purpose of the choir was to provide professional choral opportunities to young musicians who lived in areas of Canada that could not support professional choirs. Their mandate was to organize and perform short intensive “projects" two or three times each year.

The original artistic director was Montreal-based conductor, Iwan Edwards. In 2004, Julia Davids took over the artistic responsibilities. Under Davids' leadership, the choir focuses on developing the choral art through education and outreach initiatives, while also striving for artistic excellence.

== Past Projects ==
=== 2013 ===
- 12–20 October – BC Tour: workshops with Oak Bay High School Chamber Choir, University of British Columbia, North Van schools, St. Patrick Regional Secondary School, Douglas College; Capilano University; concerts in Vancouver, and Vancouver Island and Lower Mainland areas. Joint concert with Vox Humana. Conducting Fellow: Kathleen Allan
- 2–10 February – Ontario Tour: workshops with All Saints Anglican Church, Parkview Elementary School, Sandwich West Public School, University of Western Ontario; concerts in Windsor (joint concert with Windsor Classic Chorale), St. Thomas, Stratford, Toronto (joint concert with Toronto Children's Chorus), Burlington.

=== 2012 ===
- 14–22 January – Ontario Tour: workshops with HB Beal Secondary School, Schuessler Singers, Wesley-Knox Church Choir; concerts in London, Kitchener, Guelph, Elmira.
- 26 October – 5 November – Nova Scotia Tour: Partnership (workshop and joint concert) with Nova Scotia Choral Federation; workshops with Acadia Vocal Ensemble, Kings Chorale, Rockingstone Heights School; concerts in Port Williams, Wolfville, Truro, St. Francois Xavier, Halifax.

=== 2010 ===
- 18 May: The choir released their first studio CD, In Good Company. It is an all-Canadian CD featuring special guests, mezzo-soprano Christianne Rushton of Nova Scotia and talented cellist, Se Hee Kim. The recording has pieces by Canadian composers including Allan Rae, Jocelyn Morlock, Lionel Daunais, and Jeffrey Ryan. Additionally it contains the commissioned piece At Sunset by Jeff Enns of Elmira, Ontario.
- 20–23 May: The choir performed a sold out concert at Podium 2010 hosted by the Association of Canadian Choral Communities (ACCC) and the Saskatchewan Choral Federation (SCF).

=== 2009 ===
- August: While in residence at Mennonite Collegiate Institute in Gretna, Manitoba the choir recorded their first studio CD, In Good Company.

=== 2007 ===
- 3–10 March: Alberta (residency at Rosebud School of Arts, Rosebud). Guest Conductor Kathleen Skinner from Edmonton. Joint concert with Kokopelli & Oran in Edmonton. Joint concert with Ambassador Choir, C(h)oeur des femmes, and Red Deer College Chamber Choir in Three Hills, Joint concert with Rosa Cantorum in Rosebud, Joint concert with Spiritus Chamber Choir in Calgary. Workshops with six local schools in the province.
- 13–20 October: Ontario. Conducting Fellow Sonja van de Hoef. Concerts in Hamilton, London, and Elmira. Workshops with Appleby College, Oakville Children's Choir, University of Western Ontario conducting students, Royal Canadian College of Organists and a few local schools.

=== 2006 ===
- 12–18 February: Ontario (residency at Appleby College, Oakville). Guest performance with the Guelph Chamber Choir. Three Choral Collaboration workshops in Oakville, Toronto, London. Two fundraising events in Toronto & London, titled "The CCC Unchambered"
- 13–20 October: Manitoba (residency at Brandon University, Brandon, Manitoba. Performances in Gretna, Brandon, Steinbach and Winnipeg (joint performance with Prairie Voices). Four Collaboration Workshops at Mennonite Collegiate Institute (Gretna), Brandon University, Brandon High School and Steinbach Regional Secondary School

=== 2005 ===
- 16–22 February: Ontario (residency at Appleby College, Oakville). Debut of new Artistic Director, Julia Davids. Launch of new education initiatives with Choral Collaboration workshop at Appleby. Benefit concert in Toronto supporting The Stephen Lewis Foundation.
- 18–24 September: Saskatchewan (residency at North Battleford Comprehensive High School). Concerts in North Battleford, Regina, Rosthern and Saskatoon. Four workshops in North Battleford, Regina and Rosthern

=== 2003 ===
- 19–26 January: Manitoba (residency at Brandon University). Performance at the Winnipeg Symphony Orchestra Centara New Music Festival. First apprentice conductor position held by Rachel Grantham of Whitehorse, Yukon. Workshops at Brandon University School of Music.
- 22–29 March: Quebec (residency at McGill University, Montreal). Commissioned Love Songs, by Stewart Grant. Full-length concert recorded by CBC Radio Two for Québec in Concert
- 14–21 May: Nova Scotia. Guest artists at International Choral Festival Suas e!, Cape Breton. Mentors of the festival's mixed-voice youth choir.

=== 2002 ===
- 20–27 April: British Columbia (residency at Ryerson United Church, Vancouver). First workshops with secondary school and community children's choirs.
- 1–14 August: Nova Scotia / New Brunswick (residency at Berwick United Church, NS). Artists in residence at the Nova Scotia Choral Federation's Adult Summer Camp Concert in Musique Saint-Bernard performance series

=== 2001 ===
- 25–29 January: Manitoba (residency at Brandon University])
- 17–25 August: Ontario (residency at Appleby College, Oakville)
