= Vrba =

Vrba ("willow" in several Slavic languages) may refer to:

== Places ==
=== Austria ===
- Velden am Wörther See (Slovene: Vrba na Koroškem)

=== Bosnia and Herzegovina ===
- Vrba (Glamoč), Bosnia and Herzegovina
- Vrba (Gacko), Bosnia and Herzegovina

=== Montenegro ===
- Vrba, Pljevlja

=== Serbia ===
- Vrba (Kraljevo)
- Vrba (Jagodina)
- Vrba (Tutin)

=== Slovenia ===
- Vrba, Dobrna
- Vrba, Lukovica
- Vrba, Žirovnica

== Other uses ==
- Vrba (surname), a family name
- Vrba (leafhopper), a leafhopper genus in the tribe Erythroneurini
- "Vrba" (poem), in Kytice, anthology by Karel Jaromír Erben

== See also ==
- Vrbas (disambiguation)
