= Gurke =

Gurke may refer to:

- Robert Louis August Maximilian Gürke aka Max Gürke (1854–1911), German botanist
- USS Gurke (DD-783), Gearing-class destroyer of the United States Navy
- Henry Gurke (1922–1943), United States Marine killed in action in the Bougainville Campaign of World War II
