= USS John A. Bole =

Allen M. Sumner-class destroyer

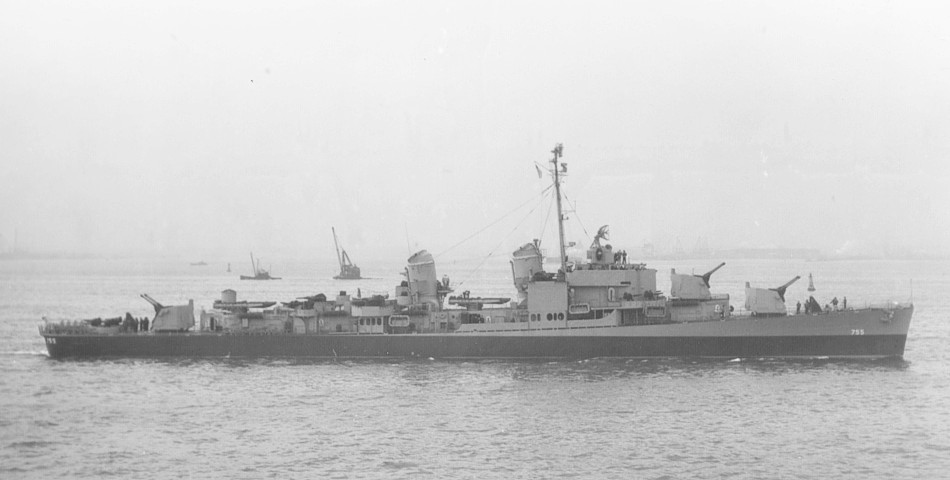
- USS John A. Bole

History

United States
- Name: USS John A. Bole
- Namesake: John A. Bole
- Builder: Bethlehem Mariners Harbor, Staten Island, New York
- Laid down: 20 May 1944
- Launched: 1 November 1944
- Commissioned: 3 March 1945
- Decommissioned: 6 November 1970
- Stricken: 1 February 1974
- Identification: DD-755
- Fate: To Taiwan 6 May 1974 and cannibalized for spare parts

General characteristics
- Class & type: Allen M. Sumner-class destroyer
- Displacement: 2,200 tons
- Length: 376 ft 6 in (114.76 m)
- Beam: 40 ft (12 m)
- Draft: 15 ft 8 in (4.78 m)
- Propulsion: 60,000 shp (45,000 kW); 2 propellers
- Speed: 34 knots (63 km/h; 39 mph)
- Range: 6,500 nmi (12,000 km; 7,500 mi) at 15 kn (28 km/h; 17 mph)
- Complement: 336
- Armament: 6 × 5 in (127 mm)/38 cal. guns, 12 × 40 mm AA guns, 11 × 20 mm AA guns, 10 × 21 inch (533 mm) torpedo tubes, 6 × depth charge projectors, 2 × depth charge tracks

USS John A. Bole (DD-755), was an Allen M. Sumner-class destroyer of the United States Navy.

A Gearing-class destroyer John A. Bole was renamed Gurke on 15 June 1944 prior to being launched 15 February 1945.

John A. Bole, was laid down on 20 May 1944 by Bethlehem Steel Co., Staten Island, New York and launched on 1 November 1944; sponsored by Mrs. John A. Bole Jr., widow of Lieutenant Commander Bole. The ship was commissioned on 3 March 1945.

== Namesake ==
John Archibald Bole Jr. was born on 28 March 1906 in Elmhurst, New York. He graduated from the United States Naval Academy in 1928. After serving on the USS Tennessee, he underwent submarine training. Bole subsequently served in a succession of submarines, taking command of USS S-21 in June 1940. Appointed Lieutenant Commander on 2 January 1942, he became the commanding officer of USS Amberjack upon its commissioning in July 1942. After two offensive patrols in the Solomon Islands, the submarine departed Brisbane, Australia on 26 January 1943 to prowl the shipping lanes around Rabaul. Amberjack sank a freighter on 4 February and was last heard from 10 days later. Japanese records indicate Amberjack was probably sunk in an attack 16 February 1943 at about 5°05′S 152°37′E. Bole was posthumously awarded the Navy Cross for his outstanding performance as her commander.

== Service history ==
=== World War II ===
Following shakedown training out of Guantanamo Bay, Cuba, John A. Bole escorted the aircraft carrier Franklin north to New York, arriving on 24 April 1945. After moving to Boston to join Saint Paul, she sailed on 15 May for the Pacific during the final push in the war against Japan. Steaming via the Panama Canal, she arrived at Pearl Harbor on 7 June 1945. The ship joined a carrier group in Hawaiian waters, took part in the air strike on Wake Island on 20 June, and escorted a carrier to Eniwetok, arriving on 21 June.

John A. Bole arrived at Okinawa on 29 June for picket and patrol duty; and, although ground fighting had virtually ceased, weeks of intermittent air raids and picket duty were still in store for the fleet. The ship remained off Okinawa until the Japanese acceptance of surrender terms on 15 August, then departed for the East China and Yellow Seas to support the occupation and to take part in minesweeping operations. John A. Bole joined a cruiser-destroyer force on 8 September off Jinsen, Korea, to cover the landings of troops at that important port. She remained until 25 September, and arrived three days later at Saishu To, south of the Korean Peninsula, to accept the surrender of the island and demilitarize it.

The destroyer remained in the Far East after the end of the war to carry mail and passengers between Japan, Korea, and Chinese ports, supporting the efforts of American Marines to protect Allied lives and stabilize the Chinese situation. While at Qingdao on 20 February 1946, upon receiving a distress signal from a sinking merchantmen, she succeeded in rescuing 13 survivors. Bole departed on 5 March for San Francisco and, after stopping at Guam and Pearl Harbor, arrived on 27 March 1946.

Following a long repair period to prepare her for peacetime service, the destroyer arrived San Diego on 10 April 1947 to begin a regular schedule of training maneuvers and cruises for Naval Reservists. She continued to operate on the West Coast, with occasional visits to Hawaii, through 1949.

=== Korean War ===
With the outbreak of the Korean War in June 1950, John A. Bole began intensive preparations for combat service. Sailing from San Diego on 30 September, she steamed via Japan to join Task Force 77 off the Korean coast. With the amphibious assault on Inchon on 15 September, an end run made possible by control of the sea, the tide of the ground war rapidly reversed. The Communist forces far to the south collapsed. John A. Bole shifted from amphibious attack to fire support of advancing UN troops. She then screened carriers during the air operations, helping to support both battle-line air strikes and interdiction of northern supply lines. On 11 April 1951, John A. Bole was stationed near the coast of mainland China, three miles off Swatow, China, on the orders of General Douglas MacArthur, in an unsuccessful attempt by him to provoke China into a war with the United States. Armed Chinese junks surrounded the ship, but in the meantime, MacArthur was relieved and the ship was moved away from its "sitting duck" role off the Chinese harbor. John A. Bole also steamed with support convoys into Inchon before returning to San Diego in mid-June 1951.

The ship was underway again for Korea on 3 January 1952. Upon arrival she helped maintain the pressure on Communist troops in the stalemated land war by screening carriers during air attacks. Bole also took part in shore bombardment along both the east and west coasts of North Korea, operating with British and Dutch ships. The ship moved to the Formosa Straits for patrol duty designed to deter Chinese Communist aggression there, finally returning to San Diego on 11 July 1952.

Following a yard period in which she added 3-inch rapid fire guns to her armament, John A. Bole departed on 21 February 1953 for her third Korean tour. During March she operated off the coast with Saint Paul, and sailed on 10 April for the Formosa Straits to resume patrol duty. Then after returning to Korean waters, the destroyer sailed on 1 June to Wonsan harbor for six days dueling with shore batteries while protecting the allied-held offshore islands. She then screened the battleship New Jersey before the Korean armistice on 27 July 1953, after which she returned to Japan. Escort duty with the carrier Princeton closed her cruise, and John A. Bole arrived San Diego on 22 September 1953.

=== 1954-1967 (Cold War, Formosa Patrol, Vietnam) ===
The destroyer returned to the Far East again in 1954, taking part in the continuing Formosa Patrol and in amphibious training exercises. She sailed from San Diego on 20 April and returned 17 October, adding carrier operations in the South China Sea and antisubmarine warfare exercises off Okinawa to her busy schedule.

John A. Bole sailed on 29 July 1957 for the Western Pacific, this time visiting Pago Pago; Auckland, New Zealand; and Manus en route to Japan. She took part in carrier operations with Bon Homme Richard and in December again steamed Formosa Strait. The ship returned to San Diego on 8 January 1958 and took part in exercises off California until July. John A. Bole again sailed westward on 23 August 1958, this time amid mounting chaos from revolt in Indonesia and growing trouble in southeast Asia. She operated in the Philippines and on Formosa Patrol, helping to stabilize affairs in this strategic region, returning to San Diego on 16 February 1959.

The destroyer made still another cruise to the Far East 1959–60, sailing on 30 October. She operated with the 7th Fleet's hunter-killer force off Okinawa during November and December, arriving Formosa on 4 January 1960 for patrol duty. She returned to San Diego on 12 March 1960. In June, John A. Bole served as an air-sea rescue station ship for President Dwight D. Eisenhower's flight across the Pacific, and during the summer she embarked NROTC Midshipmen for training. In October she was assigned to a hunter-killer group built around Kearsarge, and after training, departed on 4 March 1961 for the Far East. The ships carried out further training, this time with Canadian ships out of Pearl Harbor, but with a worsening of the Laos situation, steamed to Subic Bay to bolster Navy strength and deter more serious trouble. Hunter-killer operations continued until September, and John A. Bole returned to California via the northern great-circle route to help gather hydrographic data, arriving her home port on 18 September.

John A. Bole entered San Francisco Naval Shipyard in late 1961 to undergo a major Fleet-Rehabilitation-and-Modernization overhaul, designed to equip her with the latest equipment and lengthen her active service life several years. Emerging in July 1962, she took part in training operations for the remainder of the year, interrupted by several weeks of alert at sea during the Cuban Missile Crisis in October. During the first few months of 1963, she operated out of San Diego, sailing 1 April 1963 for Pearl Harbor and the Western Pacific. This cruise helped to maintain the vital American presence in the Far East, and she returned to San Diego on 3 December 1963. In the first half of 1964, she was engaged in antisubmarine operations, including tests of her new DASH. John A. Bole sailed 23 October 1964 for the Western Pacific with a group composed of Yorktown and other destroyers. After maneuvers in Hawaiian waters, she reported to Commander 7th Fleet on 2 January 1965 to resume peacekeeping operations in the troubled region. During the deployment, the destroyer operated with a carrier task group and an ASW hunter-killer group, then patrolled Taiwan Straits. From 9–25 February, she operated off Vietnam.

Returning to San Diego on 24 May, the destroyer entered Hunter's Point Naval Shipyard late in June for overhaul and stayed there through the remaining summer. She operated out of San Diego until sailing on 22 March 1966 for the Far East. On 18 April, she began naval gunfire support duties off Vietnam which continued until she began plane guard patrol at Yankee Station on 4 May. On 8 May, the destroyer sailed to Japan for repairs but was back at Yankee Station on the 25th. But for brief runs to Hong Kong and Subic Bay, Bole remained in the war zone until 27 July, when she headed for Taiwan. She visited Malaysia before heading home via Subic Bay, Guam, and Pearl Harbor, arriving San Diego on 24 September. She operated out of home port for the remainder of the year, and in 1967 prepared for future action.

=== 1967-1970 (Vietnam) ===
John A. Bole departed San Diego for a Westpac cruise on 28 December 1967. Arriving in the Hawaiian Islands on 13 January 1968, John A. Bole got underway on 14 January and operated in the Hawaiian Operating Areas, conducting training qualifications exercises before departing en route to Yokosuka, Japan on 19 January. On 26 January, news of the capture of USS Pueblo by North Korea was received and Bole was diverted to the Sea of Japan for contingency operations as part of Operation Formation Star. The destroyer operated in the Sea of Japan maintaining Surface Action Unit (SAU) stations through heavy seas, cold, ice and snow. On 12 February John A. Bole conducted a Search and Rescue (SAR) effort to a South Korean fishing vessel in distress. After transferring food and water, the destroyer took the vessel in tow and proceeded to Po-Hang, South Korea where the tow was transferred to a Republic of Korea (ROK) naval vessel on 13 February. Bole then proceeded to plane guard station for Yorktown en route to Yankee Station in the Gulf of Tonkin. While operating in the Gulf of Tonkin on 25 March, the destroyer conducted an alongside submarine replenishment (SUBREP) for Sterlett. On 30 March, John A. Bole departed the Gulf of Tonkin for its first, 10-day port visit of the deployment and destroyer tender availability with Samuel Gompers in Kaohsiung, Taiwan (3–13 April). On 13 April John A. Bole departed Kaohsiung for II Corps, Republic of Vietnam, arriving 15 April in Qui Nhon harbor and relieved Henderson of Naval Gunfire Support (NGFS duties). The destroyer conducted NGFS in II Corps through 23 April and departed for Hong Kong. John A. Bole arrived in Hong Kong 25 April for a port visit. The warship departed Hong Kong 30 April for Yankee Station plane guard duties. On 5 May John A. Bole rendezvoused with Yorktown and assumed plane guard duties. On 6–9 May the destroyer operated with Ticonderoga for plane guard. From 10 to 13 May the destroyer conducted plane guard duties for Enterprise; from 13 to 16 May for Kitty Hawk; 16–19 May for Enterprise; 19-120 May for Kitty Hawk; and 20–24 May for Yorktown. On 24 May John A. Bole departed the Gulf of Tonkin en route to Singapore, crossing the equator on 28 May and arriving at HM Royal Dockyard Singapore on 29 May. On 2 June, the ship's mascot, Ensign Chiko, a monkey, joined the crew. On 3 June the destroyer departed Singapore for II Corps Republic of Vietnam. On 5 June John A. Bole arrived at II Corps and relieved Mansfield of NGFS duties. The destroyer was relieved of NGFS duties by Picking and detached en route to Sasebo, Japan. On 16 June John A. Bole rendezvoused with Yorktown and commenced plane guard duties en route to Sasebo arriving at the US Naval Station on 19 June. On 21 the destroyer departed Sasebo en route to home port of San Diego arriving there on 5 July and mooring at the US Naval Station completing the Westpac deployment. The warship remained in San Diego, operating in the SOCAL OPAREAS until departing for Hunters Point, San Francisco for a three-month Regular Overhaul. John A. Bole remained in the yard until late December, returning to San Diego in time for the holidays.

On her last cruise in 1970, John A. Bole participated with Destroyer Squadron 21 in Naval Gunfire Support operations off the coast of Vietnam and also as a unit of the fast carrier attack group at Yankee Station. The destroyer left San Diego for her final Westpac cruise on 5 January 1970. On 2 February, the destroyer joined the Ranger task group (TG 77.6) in the South China Sea. From 6 to 19 February, John A. Bole conducted plane guard duties and screened Ranger in the Tonkin Gulf at Yankee Station. From 21 to 26 February the destroyer visited Hong Kong. From 3 to 15 March the ship provided naval gunfire support off the coast of South Vietnam. John A. Bole's gunfire support missions were in both NGFS Corp Area I and II (including numerous missions off the mouth of the Cua Viet River). On 16 March, the destroyer returned to the Ranger task group at Yankee Station. On 21 March the Ranger group sailed to Sasebo arriving 24 March. The destroyer remained in Sasebo until 12 April when she returned to Yankee Station with Ranger. John A. Bole remained at Yankee Station until 24 April. From 24 April to 3 May the destroyer returned to providing naval gunfire support off the coast of South Vietnam. The vesselʼs gunfire support missions were again in both NGFS Corp Area I and II. From 5 to 12 May John A. Bole made another port call to Hong Kong. On 15 May, the destroyer joined the Shangri-La task group (TG77.4) at Yankee Station. John A. Bole stayed with the Shangri-La task group until 28 May when she sailed to Subic Bay for her first stop before returning to the United States. On 28 June the destroyer returned to her homeport Naval Station San Diego.

On 30 July, John A. Bole moved from the Naval Station San Diego to the San Diego Navy Inactive Ship Maintenance Facility (NISMF) for decommissioning preparation. The crew moved off the ship to a nearby berthing barge. On 1 October, the destroyer was moved from the NISMF back to the Naval Station San Diego (Pier 2). On 6 October 1970 (1003 Hours), John A. Bole was decommissioned at the Naval Station San Diego.

John A. Bole was struck 1 February 1974. She was transferred to Taiwan 6 May 1974 and cannibalized for spare parts.

== Awards ==
John A. Bole received one battle star for World War II service and seven for Korean service. She was also the recipient of the Gold A for excellence in Anti-Submarine Warfare, and her fictionalized crew continue to serve in various Navy training curricula.
