= Allan McIver =

Canadian composer, arranger, pianist and conductor

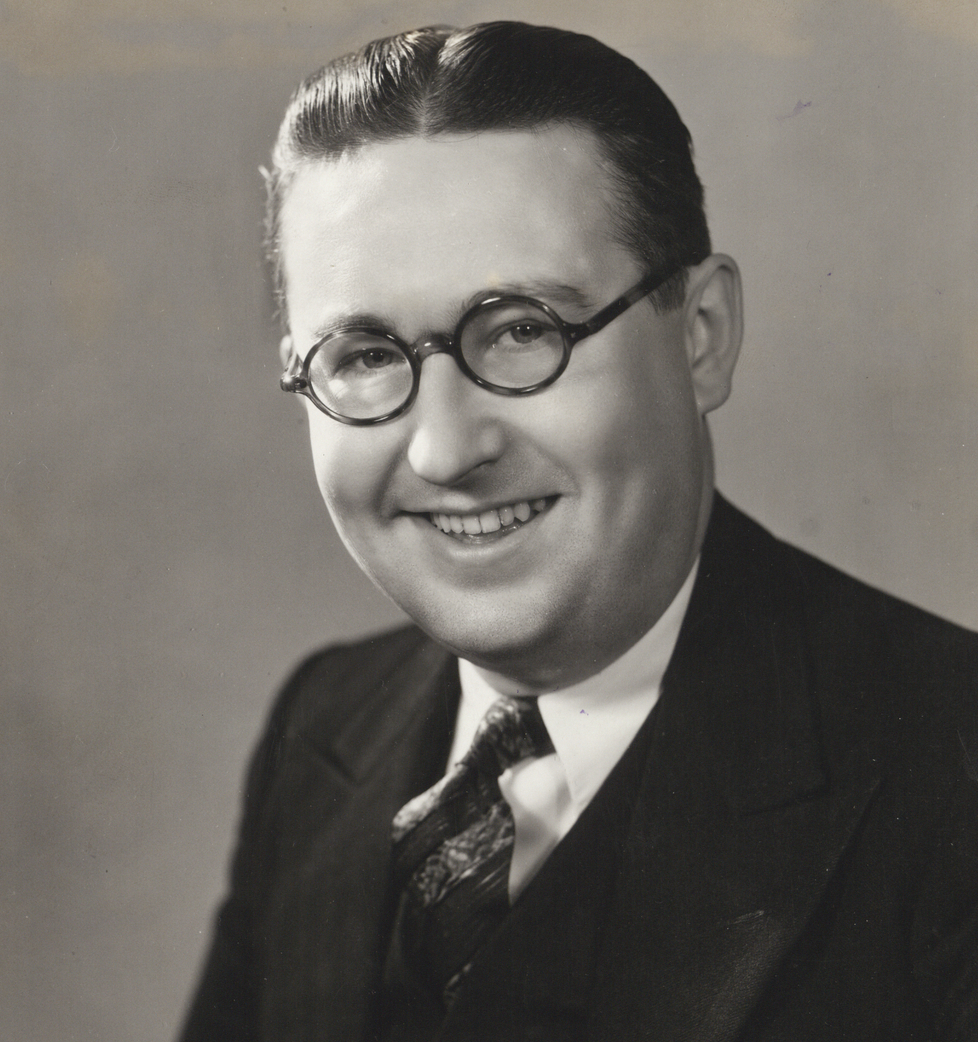
Allan McIver, 1904-1969

Joseph Allan McIver (17 January 1904 – 15 June 1969) was a Canadian composer, arranger, pianist, and conductor. As a pianist he performed with orchestras in the Quebec region in his early career and was the longtime accompanist and arranger for Trio lyrique. He had a long and fruitful relationship with the Canadian Broadcasting Corporation, serving as a music director, composer, arranger, conductor, and pianist for nearly four decades.

== Early life, education, and career ==
Born in Thetford Mines, McIver grew up in Sherbrooke. In his youth he studied the violin and the flute and was a piano student of Alfred Whitehead. He later studied harmony with Oscar O'Brien. He started his performance career playing for silent films in Montreal in 1926. He began performing on Canadian radio programs as a pianist and singer (baritone) around 1930. In the early 1930s, he started appearing as a concert pianist with orchestras like the Ottawa Philharmonic Orchestra.

== Trio lyrique ==
In 1932, McIver was enlisted to work as an accompanist and arranger for Trio lyrique (TL), a newly formed vocal trio in Montreal that consisted of baritone Lionel Daunais, contralto Anna Malenfant, and tenor Ludovic Huot. Jules Jacob replaced Huot in the early 1940s. In 1933, the ensemble was engaged by CRBC for its network series One Hour with You, on which the group performed for 87 weeks. In 1934, the TL released the LP album Chansons de Lionel Daunais for Radio Canada International. In 1936, the group performed for the CBS radio network in New York where McIver was also engaged as a staff arranger.

The TL continued to perform actively in public concerts and on CBC Radio programs like The Play of the Week, Light Up and Listen. and Serenade for Strings up until the mid-1960s when it disbanded. The group re-united briefly in the autumn of 1971 for CBC broadcasts honoring Daunais and his work. In 1984, the album Le Trio lyrique chante Lionel Daunais was released; containing music from the ensemble's many radio broadcasts. All of the arrangements performed during the TL's performance history were by McIver.

== Composer, arranger, and conductor ==
During the 1930s, McIVer began composing background music for many of the Canadian Broadcasting Corporation's radio dramas. During World War II he wrote and conducted music for the shows sponsored by the Canada Savings Bond and other radio broadcasts in Montreal. He also served as a conductor for entertainments given at army bases throughout Canada by Jack Benny.

During the 1950s and 1960s, McIVer worked actively as a music director of variety programs for both CBC Television and CBC Radio. He notably directed the music for the 5 September 1952 opening telecast of CBC (Montreal) TV. Among the programs he directed were Silhouettes, Paillettes, Northern Electric Concert, Le Trio lyrique, and Sunday Night Shows. He also composed the film score for the feature picture Le Rossignol et les cloches and wrote a number of orchestral works.

Having never retired, McIver died in Montreal in 1969 at the age of 65.
