= Neche, North Dakota =

- City
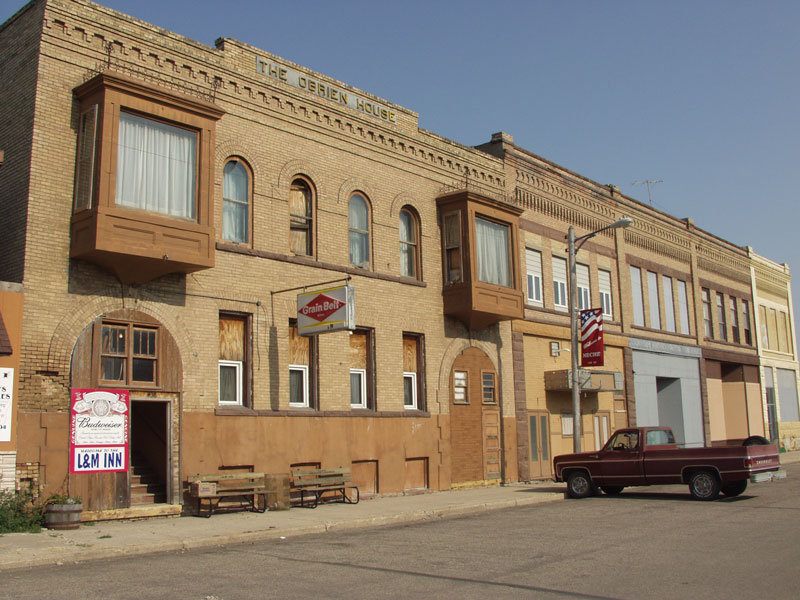
- An old hotel in Neche

- Location of Neche, North Dakota
- Coordinates: 48°58′59″N 97°33′06″W
- Country: United States
- State: North Dakota
- County: Pembina
- Founded: 1882

Area
  - Total: 0.35 sq mi (0.90 km^{2})
  - Land: 0.35 sq mi (0.90 km^{2})
  - Water: 0 sq mi (0.00 km^{2})
- Elevation: 830 ft (253 m)

Population (2020)
  - Total: 344
  - Estimate (2022): 344
  - Density: 992/sq mi (382.9/km^{2})
- Time zone: UTC-6 (Central (CST))
  - Summer (DST): UTC-5 (CDT)
- ZIP code: 58265
- Area code: 701
- FIPS code: 38-55620
- GNIS feature ID: 1036176

Neche (/ˈnɪtʃiː/ NITCH-ee) is a city in Pembina County, North Dakota, United States. It sits on the banks of the Pembina River. The population was 344 at the 2020 census.

== History ==
Neche was laid out in 1882. The name is said to come from the Ojibwe word nidji, which means friend, neighbor, or one like myself.

William L. Walton built automobiles in Neche from 1902 to 1906.

== Geography ==
According to the United States Census Bureau, the city has a total area of 0.35 square miles (0.91 km^{2}), all land.

Neche is approximately one mile south of the United States-Canada border, and the community of Gretna, Manitoba is located on the north side of the border. It is located near the Neche–Gretna Border Crossing.

== Demographics ==
Historical population
Census	Pop.	Note	%±
1890	314		—
1900	682		117.2%
1910	528		−22.6%
1920	528		0.0%
1930	502		−4.9%
1940	565		12.5%
1950	615		8.8%
1960	545		−11.4%
1970	451		−17.2%
1980	471		4.4%
1990	434		−7.9%
2000	437		0.7%
2010	371		−15.1%
2020	344		−7.3%
2022 (est.)	344		0.0%
U.S. Decennial Census; 2020 Census

=== 2010 census ===
As of the census of 2010, there were 371 people in 142 households, including 92 families, in the city. The population density was 1,060.0 inhabitants per square mile (409.3/km^{2}). There were 168 housing units at an average density of 480.0 per square mile (185.3/km^{2}). The racial makeup of the city was 99.5% White and 0.5% from two or more races. Hispanic or Latino of any race were 1.9%.

Of the 142 households 28.2% had children under the age of 18 living with them, 58.5% were married couples living together, 5.6% had a female householder with no husband present, 0.7% had a male householder with no wife present, and 35.2% were non-families. 31.0% of households were one person and 16.9% were one person aged 65 or older. The average household size was 2.61 and the average family size was 3.41.

The median age was 35.3 years. 27.5% of residents were under the age of 18; 8.9% were between the ages of 18 and 24; 23.7% were from 25 to 44; 22.4% were from 45 to 64; and 17.5% were 65 or older. The gender makeup of the city was 51.8% male and 48.2% female.

=== 2000 census ===
As of the census of 2000, there were 437 people in 169 households, including 114 families, in the city. The population density was 1,248.0 inhabitants per square mile (481.9/km^{2}). There were 188 housing units at an average density of 536.9 per square mile (207.3/km^{2}). The racial makeup of the city was 98.40% White, 0.46% Native American, 0.23% Asian, 0.69% from other races, and 0.23% from two or more races. Hispanic or Latino of any race were 5.26% of the population.

Of the 169 households 33.7% had children under the age of 18 living with them, 59.8% were married couples living together, 4.7% had a female householder with no husband present, and 32.0% were non-families. 29.6% of households were one person and 13.6% were one person aged 65 or older. The average household size was 2.59 and the average family size was 3.25.

The age distribution was 24.9% under the age of 18, 10.5% from 18 to 24, 21.1% from 25 to 44, 25.6% from 45 to 64, and 17.8% 65 or older. The median age was 41 years. For every 100 females, there were 113.2 males. For every 100 females age 18 and over, there were 105.0 males.

The median household income was $42,500 and the median family income was $48,125. Males had a median income of $26,563 versus $21,875 for females. The per capita income for the city was $23,813. About 7.1% of families and 7.9% of the population were below the poverty line, including 17.6% of those under age 18 and 6.6% of those age 65 or over.

== Notable people ==
- Henry Gurke, World War II Medal of Honor recipient
