= Iwan Edwards =

Welsh-born Canadian conductor (1937–2022)

- Born: October 5, 1937; Wales
- Died: March 4, 2022 (age 84); Lachine, Quebec, Canada
- Education: University of Wales
- Occupation: Conductor

Iwan Edwards CM (October 5, 1937 – March 4, 2022) was a Welsh-born Canadian choral conductor. Over a forty-year span he founded and conducted several choirs. He was appointed Member of the Order of Canada in 1995.

== Early life ==
Edwards was born in Wales on October 5, 1937. He studied music (violin) at the University College of Wales, graduating with a Bachelor of Music in 1961. He was then awarded a scholarship in orchestral conducting at the Royal Academy of Music, but turned it down in favour of professional teaching and directing. Edwards left Wales in 1965 and relocated to Montreal, Quebec, Canada.

== Career ==
After emigrating to Canada, Edwards initially taught music at Lachine High School until 1979. He subsequently taught at the Fine Arts Core Education School in Montreal from 1979 to 1990, before becoming an associate professor at the Faculty of Music of McGill University. During his tenure, he conducted the McGill Chamber Singers, the University Chorus and, on occasion, the McGill Symphony Orchestra and Chorus. He also served as Chairman of the Performance Department of the Faculty of Music from 1992 to 1996. He retired from academia in 2001.

Edwards established the St. Lawrence Choir in 1972. He went on to lead this choir as its director for audiences in Montreal, Toronto, Ottawa, Saratoga Springs, New York City (Carnegie Hall), and Philadelphia for 35 years until his retirement in 2007.

He also directed the F.A.C.E. Treble Choir, Concerto Della Donna, Choeur des enfants de Montréal, and the Canadian Chamber Choir, in addition to working with the Ottawa Choral Society, the Lanaudière International Festival Chorus, and the Vancouver Bach Choir. These collaborations have led to performances with orchestras in Montreal, Quebec City, Ottawa, and Vancouver and, internationally, the Karlovy Vary Symphony Orchestra in the Czech Republic. Renowned conductors with whom Edwards worked include Charles Dutoit, Franz-Paul Decker, Zubin Mehta, Bramwell Tovey, Trevor Pinnock, Helmut Rilling, Robert Shaw, Leonard Slatkin, Roger Norrington and Kent Nagano. During his 21-year tenure at the helm of the Chorus of the Montreal Symphony Orchestra (MSO), recordings involving the chorus won a Grammy Award (Les Troyens – Berlioz) and two Juno Awards (1995 for Berlioz's Les Troyens and 1997 for La damnation de Faust). Over the course of his long relationship with the MSO, Maestro Edwards conducted numerous MSO performances including Handel's Messiah at Notre Dame Basilica.

== Later years ==
Edwards was the guest conductor of the National Youth Choir of Canada in 1998 and 1999. He later became the artistic director and conductor of the newly formed Canadian Chamber Choir. He was succeeded in that capacity by Julia Davids in 2004.

Edwards retired from the Saint Lawrence Choir, Chorus of the Montreal Symphony Orchestra, and Choeur des enfants de Montréal in 2007. During his retirement, he focused on the 17-voice women ensemble Concerto Della Donna, acting as conductor and musical director.

== Awards and honours ==
Edwards was appointed a member of the Order of Canada in October 1994 and invested seven months later in May 1995. Seven years later, he was the recipient of the Queen Elizabeth II Golden Jubilee Medal.

== Personal life ==
Edwards was married to Undeg. Together, they had two children.

Edwards died on the morning of March 4, 2022, at his home in Lachine. He was 84 years old.
