= Trio lyrique =

Canadian vocal trio

- Origin: Montreal, Quebec, Canada
- Genres: Vocal
- Years active: 1932–1960s
- Past members: Lionel Daunais; Anna Malenfant; Ludovic Huot; Jules Jacob; Allan McIver

The Trio lyrique was a Canadian vocal trio founded in 1932 by baritone Lionel Daunais. Based in Montreal, the group's other original members also included contralto Anna Malenfant and tenor Ludovic Huot. Jules Jacob replaced Huot in the early 1940s. Daunais recruited pianist and composer Allan McIver to serve as the group's accompanist and arranger. All of the arrangements performed during the TL's performance history were by McIver, including arrangements of many of Daunais's compositions.

In 1933, the TL was engaged by CRBC for its network series One Hour with You, on which the group performed for 87 weeks. In 1934, the TL released the LP album Chansons de Lionel Daunais for Radio Canada International. In 1936, the group performed for the CBS radio network in New York where McIver was also engaged as a staff arranger. The TL continued to perform actively in public concerts and on CBC Radio programs like The Play of the Week, Light Up and Listen. and Serenade for Strings up until the mid-1960s when it disbanded. The group re-united briefly in the autumn of 1971 for CBC broadcasts honoring Daunais and his work. In 1984 the album Le Trio lyrique chante Lionel Daunais was released; containing music from the ensemble's many radio broadcasts.
