= Vrbas =

Vrbas may refer to:

- Vrbas (river), river in Bosnia and Herzegovina
- Vrbas, Donji Vakuf, village in Donji Vakuf, Bosnia and Herzegovina
- Vrbas, Serbia, town and municipality in Vojvodina, Serbia
- Vrbas Oblast, Kingdom of Serbs, Croats and Slovenes
- Vrbas Banovina, Kingdom of Yugoslavia

== See also ==
- Vrba (disambiguation)
