= Neche–Gretna Border Crossing =

Canada–United States border crossing

- US Border Inspection Station at Neche, ND

Locaiton
- Country: United States; Canada
- Location: ND 18 / PTH 30; US Port: 10949 North Dakota Highway 18, Neche, North Dakota 58265; Canadian Port: Manitoba Highway 30, Gretna, Manitoba R0G 0V0
- Coordinates: 49°00′02″N 97°33′25″W

Details
- Opened: 1883

Website
- US Canadian

The Neche–Gretna Border Crossing connects the cities of Neche, North Dakota and Gretna, Manitoba on the Canada–United States border. North Dakota Highway 18 on the American side joins Manitoba Highway 30 on the Canadian side. The Alberta Clipper pipeline crosses the border nearby.

== Flooding ==
The surrounding flat and low lying land exposes the location to frequent flooding. The raised road prevents water from encroaching onto the Canadian side, but the US side is not so fortunate. This crossing is frequently closed due to flooding of the Pembina River, most recently in 2009, 2011, 2013, and 2017.

== Canadian side ==
By 1877, a customs office existed at Smuggler's Point (later called Spencerville), which was estimated to be 2 kilometres (1.2 mi) west of the present crossing. This office closed in 1882. That year, the Canadian Pacific Railway (CP) connected with the St. Paul, Minneapolis, & Manitoba Railway, the forerunner of the Great Northern Railway (GN), at Gretna.

One of the oldest customs offices in the province, Gretna was established in 1883 under the administrative oversight of the Port of Emerson. The earliest activity was highway traffic, but the arrival of the railway changed the principal role. In 1889, Gretna was transferred to the oversight of the Port of Winnipeg. In 1907, the status was upgraded to Port of Gretna. The prior year, the Midland Railway of Manitoba had built a Portage la Prairie–Neche rail line. In 1909, GN acquired this railway, but the line closed in the mid-1920s.

The Gretna border station was built in 1982. A rebuild plan issued in 2017 has yet to be finalized.

In 2020, the former border hours of 8am–10pm reduced, becoming 8am–4pm.

== US side ==
The Smuggler's Point customs office may have predated the corresponding Canadian one. Up to the 1930s, harvested grain flowed southward via the GN in bond before re-entering Canada. The US border station of Neche, which was built in 1965, was replaced by a new facility in 2012.

In 2020, opening hours reduced, becoming 8am–4pm.

== See also ==
- List of Canada–United States border crossings
