= Allan Rae (composer) =

Canadian composer, conductor, and trumpeter

Allan Rae (born 3 July 1942 in Blairmore, Alberta) is a Canadian composer, conductor, and trumpeter based in Calgary, Alberta. An associate and former board member of the Canadian Music Centre and a member of the Canadian League of Composers, he is particularly known for his works for the theatre which include several musicals and operas as well as incidental music. He has been commissioned to write music for productions mounted by the National Arts Centre, the Shaw Festival, and the Stratford Festival, as well as Theatre Passe Muraille, Vancouver Playhouse, Theatre Calgary, and the Globe Theatre, Regina. Between 1985 and 2000 he was composer-in-residence at Alberta Theatre Projects.

He has also written numerous symphonic and many chamber works, including commissions for the Calgary Philharmonic and the Calgary Youth Orchestra. His music has been performed by Carol McLaughlin, Gloria Saarinen and Cenek J. Vrba among others.

Rae studied composition and arranging at the Berklee College of Music. He later studied electronic music and composition with Samuel Dolin at The Royal Conservatory of Music from 1970 to 1973. He began his career as a trumpeter in the Band of Lord Strathcona's Horse (Royal Canadians). He worked for CBC Calgary TV and radio as a composer and conductor from 1966 to 1970. He served briefly on the music faculty at the RCMT in 1973–1974.

== Works ==
=== Solo piano ===
- Through a Broken Window 1970 (twelve short movements)
- Songs for Children 1978 Book #1
- Alam Al Mithal 1978
- Songs for Children 1980 Book #2
- Poetic Petits #3 (n.d)
- Be true, you need not fail 1999

=== Harp ===
- Mirror of Galadriel 1977
- Fantazzia 1979
- Be true, you need not fail 2005 (see above for solo piano version)

=== Chamber music ===
- String Quartet #1 1967
- Autumn Colours (WW. Quartet) 1969
- A Day in the Life of a Toad (Brass Quintet) 1970
- Impressions (WW. Quintet) 1971
- Sleep Whispering (Flute, Percussion, Piano) 1971
- String Quartet #2 1971
- Things to Play on A Boring Day (Thirteen short Trumpet duets) 1972
- Ode to a Pumpkin (Quintet for Percussion) 1973
- Poems for Trio (Violin, Piano, Cello) 1974
- Four Brass Quartets 1975
- On the Wind (Violin, Piano, Cello) 1976
- Rainbow Sketches (Flute, Oboe, Violin, Piano, two Percussion) 1976
- Alto Flute Sonata 1977
- Improvisations for String Quartet 1977
- Improvisations for WW Quartet 1977
- Whispering of the Nagual (Flute, B♭ Clarinet, B♭ Trumpet, Trombone, Cello, Piano and Percussion) 1978
- Images #1 (Trumpet and F Horn) 1979
- Images #2 (Flute and Clarinet) 1979,
- Images #3 (B♭ Trumpet, F Horn, Tuba) 1979
- Images #4 (Flute, B♭ Clarinet, Bassoon) 1979
- Kiwani Owapi (Two Pianos, B♭ Clarinet, Two Percussion) 1981
- Reflections (Violin, Piano, Cello) 1981
- Something Old, Something New (Brass Quintet) 1981
- En Passant (Two Marimbas) 1982
- Ancien Régime (Cello and Piano) 1986
- Caamora (Piano and Violin) 1987
- Serenade (Tuba and Piano) 1991
- Chanson da Camera (String Quartet) 1993
- 10 March – Chinook, Hallulelujah (Violin, Flute, Cello, Marimba) 1993
- Poetic Petits #2 (Harp and Clarinet) 1993
- Poetic Petits #4 (String Quartet) 1993
- Poetic Petits #5 (Harp, Flute, B♭ Clarinet) 1993
- Poetic Petits #6 (String Quartet) 1993
- Poetic Petits#7 (B♭ Clarinet, F Horn, Harp, Marimba) 1993
- Poetic Petits #8 (Alto Flute, B♭ Clarinet, F Horn, Marimba, Harp) 1993
- Poetic Petits #9 (Alto Flute, Marimba, Harp) 1993
- Circles (Clarinet, Bassoon Harp) 1996
- Dialogues (Alto Flute, B♭ Clarinet, F Horn, Marimba, Harp) 1996
- Echar La Casa por la Ventana (String Quartet) 1996
- Hay Que Gozar Mucho Para Desquitarse do la Vida (String Quartet, Alto Flute, Harp, Marimba) 1996
- Todo esto muy Diverdo (Brass Quintet) 1996
- Romance (Oboe and Bassoon) 1997
- Even a Tyrannosaurus can be Romantic (Tuba Quartet) 1998
- Whispering of the Nagual (Flute, B♭ Clarinet, Violin, Viola, Cello, Percussion, Piano) 1978, revised in 1998
- Dialogue (B♭ Clarinet, Piano, Drums and Cello) 1999
- Energy (Piano, 2 Violins, Viola and Cello) 1999
- From the wings of a raven (Alto Flute, Bass Clarinet, 2 Violins, Viola and Cello) 1999
- If The Raven Speaks (Violin, Viola and Cello) 1999
- I must speak (Clarinet and Marimba) 1999
- I too remember (Alto Flute, Piano and Cello) 1999
- There was peace (Violin and Viola) 1999
- Visions of the Past from the Future (Flute, Clarinet, Piano, Drums, 2 Violins, Viola and Cello) 1999
- With force (Violin, Viola and Cello) 1999
- You must pay attention (Flute, Clarinet, Piano, Drums, 2 Violins, Viola and Cello) 1999
- Impromptu (Marimba and Cello) 2002
- Scherzando (Marimba and Cello) 2002
- Tess (Piano and narrator) 2005
- Three Movements for Piano and Violin 2006
- Winter Chinook (Trio for three Harps) 2006
- A Road Through Alberta Foothills (Bass Clarinet, Piano and Violin) 2009

=== Chamber orchestra ===
- Db Harp Concerto 1976
- Sonata for Bass Clarinet 1976 Strings and B♭ Bass Clarinet
- Concerto for Bass 1977
- Concerto for Violin and String Ensemble 1979
- D Minor Piano Concerto 1978

=== Choral ===
- Listen to the Wind (Chorus and Orchestra) 1973
- Keltic Suite (SATB unaccompanied) 1993
- Transition (SATB and Orchestra) 1993
- Pacific Suite (SATB and String Orchestra) 1994
- Gaia – Earth Images 2009

=== Orchestra ===
- Trip (youth orchestra) 1970
- Wheel of Fortune 1971
- Two Thousand Years Ago 1972
- Symphony # 1 1972 "In the Shadow of Atlantis"
- Love is Me 1972
- The Hippopotamus 1972
- Celebration (youth orchestra) 1974
- Image for Orchestra 1975
- The Alberta Pioneers (youth orchestra) 1980
- Symphony #2 1978 "Winds of Change"
- Symphony #3 1980
- Mirror of Galadriel 1982 (see above for solo harp version)
- L`heure Entre Chien et Loup 1994
- Mist of Summer Seas (string orchestra) 1995
- Standing Stones 1995
- Imagenés de Baja (string orchestra) 1996
- Tu Hablas muy Bien 1996, Concerto for Trumpet
- Celebration of Spring 1998, (in four movements)
- Take Back the Ring 2001
- 'Alam Al Mithal' (n.d.)

=== Dance drama/ballet ===
- Like Gods, Like Gods Among Them 1973 Two Act Dance Drama
- Mirror, Mirror 1974 one act, two scene ballet
- Scarecrow 1975 Mime stage show

=== Music theatre ===
- You Two Stay Here and the Rest Come With Me (1968–9)
- Trip (1969–70)
- Where Are You Now That We Need You Simon Fraser? (1971)
- Beware the Quickly Who (1971)
- Charles Manson AKA Jesus Christ (1972)

== See also ==
- In Good Company album
