= Henry Gurke =

U.S. Marine (1922–1943)

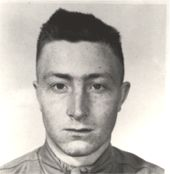
- Medal of Honor recipient Henry Gurke
- Born: November 6, 1922; Neche, North Dakota, U.S.
- Died: November 9, 1943 (aged 21); KIA on Bougainville Island
- Burial place: initially Bougainville * later Munda, New Georgia * then Finschhafen, New Guinea * finally Neche Union Cemetery Neche, North Dakota
- Military career
- Allegiance: United States of America
- Branch: United States Marine Corps
- Service years: 1942–1943
- Rank: Private First Class
- Unit: 3rd Raider Battalion
- Conflicts: World War II: Bougainville campaign
- Awards: Medal of Honor (1943); Purple Heart
- Other work: Civilian Conservation Corps

Private First Class Henry Gurke (November 6, 1922 – November 9, 1943) was a United States Marine who was killed in action in 1943 in the Bougainville Campaign of World War II. For his heroic actions, he posthumously received the Medal of Honor — the highest military honor bestowed by the United States.

== Biography ==
Henry Gurke was born in Neche, North Dakota on November 6, 1922, to immigrant parents, Julius Gurke (1884–1968), a German-speaking carpenter from Dubno, a city on the Ikva River in the Rivne Oblast (province) of western Ukraine and his wife, Hulda Fischer Gurke (1890–1970). His parents had first immigrated to Canada from Ukraine and then to the United States from Winnipeg, Manitoba in July 1912. The fifth of eight children, he was baptized in the Lutheran Church, and attended the local schools around Neche, a small town in the northeast corner of North Dakota, one mile from the Canadian bordertown of Gretna, Manitoba. After graduation from high school in 1940, he entered the Civilian Conservation Corps (CCC) in July and was stationed in Larimore, North Dakota. He stayed in the CCC until October 1941 and rose to the position of Assistant Leader, then returned to Neche where he drove a two–ton truck until his enlistment in the United States Marine Corps on April 15, 1942.

Private Gurke went through recruit training at Marine Corps Recruit Depot San Diego, then went into the 2d Separate Pack Howitzer Battalion of the 22nd Marines and was in C Battery only one month before shipping overseas on the SS Lurline on July 30, 1942 — three and a half months after his enlistment in the Marines. He landed at Apia, Upolu, British Samoa, one month later. Within two weeks the 3rd Battalion, 22nd Marines, with Pvt Gurke's battery attached, went to Uvea Island of the Wallis Islands to relieve the 3rd Battalion, 7th Marines, which left to rejoin the 1st Marine Division then engaged in the grueling fight for Guadalcanal. In September 1942, Pvt Gurke was transferred to Company D, 3rd Raider Battalion. After four months at Wallis, the Raiders left for Pago Pago, American Samoa, stayed there about three weeks, then moved south to Espiritu Santo in the New Hebrides, landing there in January 1943.

The following month the Raiders went over to Guadalcanal for a few days en route to the Russell Islands. Pavuvu Island in the Russells was occupied without opposition by Pvt Gurke's battalion from February 21, to March 18, 1943. The battalion returned to Espiritu Santo in March. On August 1, 1943, Gurke was promoted to private first class.

Transferred to Company M, 3rd Raider Battalion, 2nd Raider Regiment of the I Marine Amphibious Corps in June, PFC Gurke was at Nouméa, New Caledonia, in October and finally met the enemy at Bougainville in November.

Private First Class Gurke was in a shallow two–man foxhole with a fellow Marine, a Browning Automatic Rifle–man (BAR–man), around dawn of November 9, 1943, delivering a fierce stream of fire against the advancing Japanese in defense of a vital road block in the area near Empress Augusta Bay. Judging from the increased ferocity of the enemy grenade attack, that the enemy was determined to annihilate him and his buddy because of the fierce effective fire they were rendering, PFC Gurke roughly thrust his companion aside when a Japanese grenade landed in their foxhole and threw himself on the deadly missile. For his unswerving devotion to duty and uncommon valor in the face of the enemy, President Franklin D. Roosevelt posthumously awarded the Medal of Honor to PFC Gurke.

The medal was presented to his parents at ceremonies in the Navy Department on May 31, 1944. The Assistant Secretary of the Navy made the presentation in the name of the President.

In 1945, PFC Gurke's mother, Mrs. Julius (Hulda) Gurke, sponsored the destroyer USS Gurke (DD-783) that was named in honor of her son.

The body of PFC Gurke was originally buried at Bougainville, later moved to Munda, New Georgia, and then to Finschhafen, New Guinea, and was finally returned for burial in Neche Union Cemetery in Neche, North Dakota.

== Medal of Honor citation ==
The President of the United States takes pleasure in presenting the MEDAL OF HONOR posthumously to

PRIVATE FIRST CLASS HENRY GURKE
UNITED STATES MARINE CORPS

for service as set forth in the following CITATION:

For extraordinary heroism and courage above and beyond the call of duty while serving with the Third Marine Raider Battalion during action against the enemy Japanese Forces in the Solomon Islands area on November 9, 1943. While his platoon was engaged in the defense of a vital road block near Empress Augusta Bay on Bougainville Island, Private First Class Gurke, in company with another Marine, was delivering a fierce stream of fire against the main vanguard of the Japanese. Concluding from the increasing ferocity of grenade barrages that the enemy was determined to annihilate their shallow, two–man foxhole, he resorted to a bold and desperate measure for holding out despite the torrential hail of shells. When a Japanese grenade dropped squarely into the foxhole, Private First Class Gurke, mindful that his companion manned an automatic weapon of superior fire power and therefore could provide more effective resistance, thrust him roughly aside and flushing his own body over the missile to smother the explosion. With unswerving devotion to duty and superb valor, Private First Class Gurke sacrificed himself in order that his comrade might live to carry on the fight. He gallantly gave his life in the service of his country.

/S/ FRANKLIN D. ROOSEVELT

== Awards and decorations ==

1st row	Medal of Honor	Purple Heart	Combat Action Ribbon
2nd row	American Campaign Medal	Asiatic-Pacific Campaign Medal with two campaign stars	World War II Victory Medal

== See also ==
- List of Medal of Honor recipients for World War II
