= Vrba (surname) =

Vrba (Czech feminine: Vrbová) is a surname. Notable people with the surname include:

- Cenek J. Vrba (born 1947), Czechoslovak violinist and concertmaster
- Elisabeth Vrba (1942–2025), American paleontologist
- Ivan Vrba (born 1977), Czech track cyclist
- Jan Vrba (bobsledder) (born 1982), Czech bobsledder
- Jan Vrba (politician) (1937–2020), Czech politician
- Pavel Vrba (born 1963), Czech football manager
- Rudolf Vrba (1924–2006), Holocaust survivor and co-author of the Vrba-Wetzler report
