= St. Lawrence Choir =

Canadian mixed-voice choir

The St. Lawrence Choir is a Canadian mixed-voice choir that performs music from the classical choral repertoire as well as contemporary works by Canadian and other composers. It was founded in 1972.

== History ==
St. Lawrence Choir was formed in 1972 by Iwan Edwards and a group of singers residing in the West Island of Montreal. Concerts were presented in Lachine until 1983 when the Choir relocated to downtown Montreal. Between 1986 and 2009, the Choir regularly appeared with the Montreal Symphony Orchestra as the amateur component of the Montreal Symphony (OSM) chorus, and made numerous recordings with the symphony. With the OSM, the Choir appeared in Montreal, Toronto, Ottawa, New York, Philadelphia, Saratoga Springs and at the Lanaudière International Music Festival.

In 1992, the Choir was involved in two concerts to mark the 350th anniversary of the founding of Montreal.

On November 1, 1998, the Choir performed with a gala philharmonic orchestra and a number of children's choirs to celebrate the Golden Jubilee of the State of Israel, with proceeds going to the Montreal Children's Hospital Foundation.

In 1989 thru 2000, St. Lawrence Choir performed with the OSM and Charles Dutoit at Carnegie Hall and the Lincoln Center to critical acclaim, presenting works by Faure, Dallapiccola, Szymanowski, Orff, de Falla, and Theodorakis.

In 2007-2008 the St. Lawrence Choir was directed by Marika Kuzma during her sabbatical from University of California, Berkeley. From 2008 to 2013 it was directed by Swiss-born conductor Michael Zaugg, now director of Pro Coro Canada in Edmonton, Alberta.

In 2014, versatile and passionate choral musician, Philippe Bourque was appointed Artistic Director of the choir and has led the choir on new-concept collaborations. Philippe Bourque studied choral and orchestral conducting with Julian Wachner, Robert Ingari, Alexis Hauser and Ivars Taurins, and graduated from the McGill University Schulich School of Music with distinction. He is the recipient of a Lieutenant Governor's Award at the Vincent-d'Indy School of Music and is a Fellow of the Social Sciences and Humanities Research Council of Canada.

Since its inception, the St. Lawrence Choir broadcast numerous concerts across Quebec, the rest of Canada and Europe, over the French and English channels of the Canadian Broadcasting Corporation and via Euroradio.

== Notable Collaborations ==
=== Soloists and Orchestras ===
The St. Lawrence Choir has worked with excellent soloists and orchestras including:

- Baroque ensemble Les Boréades
- the McGill Chamber Orchestra
- the Ensemble Amati
- Victoria de los Ángeles
- John Avey, Theodore Baerg
- Colette Boky
- Benjamin Butterfield
- Ben Heppner
- Gaëtan Laperierre
- Daniel Lichti
- Richard Margison
- Kevin McMillan
- Peter Pears
- Gary Relyea
- Henriette Schellenberg
- Daniel Taylor
- Nathaniel Watson.

=== Notable performances by conductor ===
The Choir has worked alongside the Montreal Symphony Orchestra to perform classic pieces under their conductors such as:

- Franz-Paul Decker conducting Handel's Messiah
- Charles Dutoit conducting Mahler's Symphony No. 8, Berlioz's Requiem, Beethoven's Ninth Symphony, Verdi's Requiem, and Dvorak's Stabat Mater
- Iwan Edwards conducting Handel's Messiah, Beethoven's Missa Solemnis, Bach's B minor Mass, Mendelssohn's Elijah
- Grossman conducting Handel's Messiah
- Nicholas McGegan conducting Handel's Messiah
- Zubin Mehta conducting Mahler's Symphony No. 2
- Penderecki conducting Penderecki's Polish Requiem
- Robert Shaw conducting Beethoven's Missa Solemnis
- Leonard Slatkin conducting Mahler's Symphony No. 3

=== Works by Canadian Composers ===
The St. Lawrence Choir is proud to have presented works by Canadian composers such as:

- Victor Davies
- Ruth Watson Henderson
- Jacques Hétu
- Jean Laplante
- Donald Patriquin
- Imant Raminsh
- Bruce Ruddell
- Patrick Wedd
- Gilles Tremblay for the premiere of ‘Avec’
- Alain Gagnon for the Canadian premiere of ‘Chansons d’Orient’ in 2011
- Ivo Antognini for the world premiere of ‘Brink of Eternity’ in 2011
