= Rick Neufeld =

Canadian folk singer

- Origin: Canada
- Genres: Folk
- Occupation(s): Singer, songwriter

Rick Neufeld is a Canadian folk singer. Neufeld was born in Deloraine, Manitoba and raised near Boissevain. Neufeld attended Mennonite Collegiate Institute in Gretna before moving to Winnipeg to attend the University of Manitoba, where he met Paul Simon. Neufeld initially played coffeehouses throughout Canada and the United States before he got his own CBC Television show, The Songsingers. He released a number of albums, including Hiway Child in 1971, Prairie Dog in 1975 and Manitoba Songs in 1978. He was most successful as a songwriter, and his song "Moody Manitoba Morning" became a hit for The Bells.

The album Prairie Dog featured The Guess Who members Burton Cummings, Bill Wallace, and Gary Peterson as well as Terry Bush backing Neufeld.

== Discography ==
=== Albums ===
Year	Album	CAN
1971	Hiway Child	71
1975	Prairie Dog	—
1978	Manitoba Songs	—

=== Singles ===
Year	Single	Chart Positions		Album
Year	Single	CAN Country	CAN	Album
1970	"Moody Manitoba Morning"	—	83	Hiway Child
1971	"Country Princess"	—	85	Hiway Child
1974	"Country Pride"	9	—	Prairie Dog
1975	"Most Amazing Lady"	39	—	Prairie Dog
