= USS Gurke =

Gearing-class destroyer

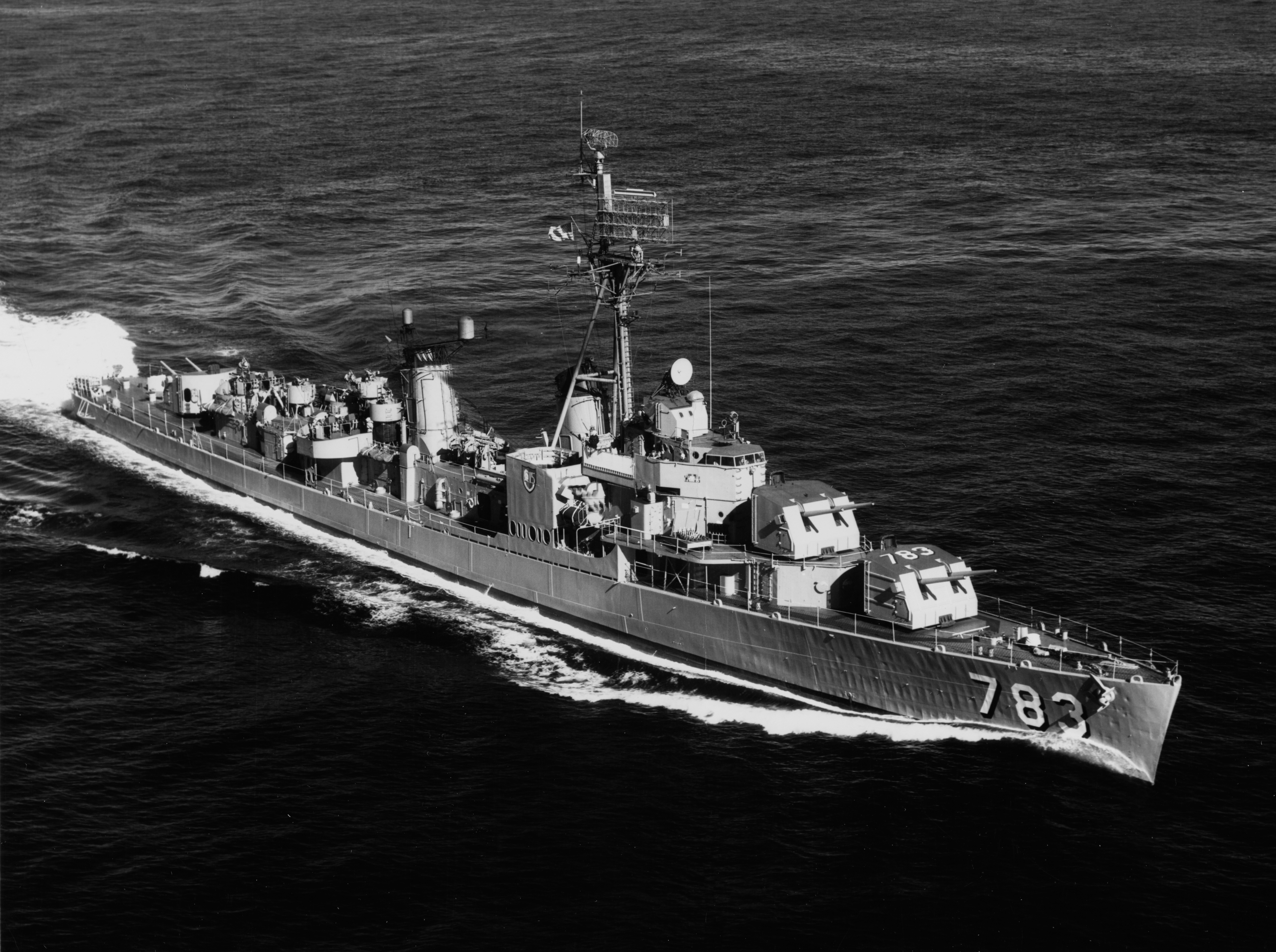

History

United States
- Name: USS Gurke (DD-783)
- Namesake: Henry Gurke
- Builder: Todd-Pacific Shipyards, Tacoma, Washington
- Laid down: 1 July 1944
- Launched: 15 February 1945
- Commissioned: 12 May 1945
- Modernized: 1 May 1964 (FRAM IB)
- Decommissioned: 30 January 1976
- Stricken: 30 January 1976
- Identification: Callsign: NTSY; Hull number: DD-783
- Honors and awards: 7 battle stars (Korea)
- Fate: Transferred to Greece, 17 March 1977

History

Greece
- Name: Tombazis (D215)
- Namesake: Iakovos Tombazis
- Acquired: 17 March 1977
- Commissioned: 3 July 1977
- Decommissioned: 12 January 1997
- Stricken: 12 January 1997
- Status: laid up

General characteristics
- Class & type: Gearing-class destroyer
- Displacement: 3,460 long tons (3,516 t) full
- Length: 390 ft 6 in (119.02 m)
- Beam: 40 ft 10 in (12.45 m)
- Draft: 14 ft 4 in (4.37 m)
- Propulsion: Geared turbines, 2 shafts, 60,000 shp (45 MW)
- Speed: 35 knots (65 km/h; 40 mph)
- Range: 4,500 nmi (8,300 km) at 20 kn (37 km/h; 23 mph)
- Complement: 336
- Armament: 6 × 5"/38 caliber guns; 12 × 40 mm AA guns; 11 × 20 mm AA guns; 10 × 21 inch (533 mm) torpedo tubes; 6 × depth charge projectors; 2 × depth charge tracks

USS Gurke (DD-783) was a Gearing-class destroyer of the United States Navy, in service from 1945 to 1976. She was transferred to Greece in 1977 and served as Tombazis (D 215) until 1997.

== History ==
DD-783 was originally laid down as "John A. Bole", but that name was reassigned to the John A. Bole (DD-755). Gurke was named for United States Marine Corps Private Henry Gurke (1922–1943), who was posthumously awarded the Medal of Honor. She was launched on 15 February 1945 by the Todd-Pacific Shipyards, Inc., Tacoma, Washington; sponsored by Mrs. Julius Gurke, mother of Private Gurke; and commissioned on 12 May 1945.

=== 1945 – 1962 ===
After shakedown along the West Coast, Gurke sailed for the Western Pacific on 27 August 1945, reaching Pearl Harbor on 2 September. From there she continued west to participate in the occupation of Japan and former Japanese possessions. Returning to her home port, San Diego, California, in February 1946, Gurke participated in training operations until 4 September 1947 when she sailed for another WesPac cruise. Two further WesPac cruises, alternating with operations out of San Diego and a cruise to Alaska in 1948 to aid in the celebration of the 50th anniversary of the Yukon gold rush, filled Gurke's schedule until the outbreak of the Korean War.

Gurke departed San Diego on 5 August 1950 and arrived at Yokosuka, Japan on 19 August to screen fast carrier task forces off the west coast of Korea, from 25 August to 6 September. She shared with five other destroyers the award of the Navy Unit Commendation to Task Element 90.62 for extraordinary heroism in support of the landing at Inchon, 13–15 September 1950. Steaming up Flying Fish (So Sudo) Channel at high tide the first day, Gurke bombarded Wolmi-do island and the Inchon waterfront. Communist fire concentrated on three of the "sitting duck" destroyers, Gurke taking three hits that caused two wounded and minor damage. The destroyer's 5-inch batteries opened in a prelanding shore bombardment on 15 September 1950 until the first assault wave of Marines crossed the line of departure for Wolmi Do, which was secured by high noon. Wolmi Do was no longer a dominating threat over approaches into Inchon by landing assault craft that would be borne in on the incoming afternoon tide. After this initial landing General of the Army Douglas MacArthur made visual signal: "The Navy and Marines have never shone more brightly than this morning."

After the Inchon landings, Gurke screened fast attack carriers launching powerful strikes against enemy positions and supply lines. She also patrolled the narrow Taiwan Straits to prevent Chinese Communist invasion of Formosa and to ensure that Formosa was not used as a base for military operations against mainland China mainland. During the first year of war Gurke frequently served as flagship of Vice Admiral Arthur D. Struble and the 7th Fleet's Carrier Task Force 77 (TF 77).

Two interludes in the States for repairs and training interrupted Gurke's Korean War service. But she continued, when deployed with the Seventh Fleet, to screen attack carriers and bombard enemy coastal supply routes and installations, once destroying a Communist train through accurate gunnery. She again drew fire from Communist shore batteries on 25 June 1953, but escaped without serious damage from two direct hits and the shrapnel of five air bursts.

When the shooting stopped in Korea in August 1953, Gurke continued patrols in the Far East to help keep the peace. Six- to eight-month deployments to the Western Pacific were alternated with stateside overhauls and training in a full peacetime routine. During 17–18 June 1960, she was a unit of the escort for cruiser Saint Paul (CA-73) carrying President Dwight D. Eisenhower on a fast Manila—Taiwan cruise. She also participated in nose cone recovery work as America's space effort rolled into high gear, facilitated by seapower.

In June 1962, Gurke participated in Operation Dominic I, a series of nuclear tests off Christmas Island.

=== 1963 – 1975 ===
Gurke commenced a Fleet Rehabilitation and Modernization (FRAM I) overhaul at Puget Sound Naval Shipyard 11 July 1963, with the refit completed on 1 May 1964. The FRAM I conversion added a launcher for RUR-5 ASROC anti-submarine missiles, two Mark 32 triple tubes for Mark 44 anti-submarine torpedoes and a hangar and flight deck for the DASH drone helicopter, along with modern SQS-23 sonar. To compensate for these additions, the ship's 21 inch torpedo tubes, a twin 5 inch gun mount and all light anti aircraft guns were removed. She arrived in her new home port of San Diego on 15 May for fleet operations along the western seaboard until 21 October when she again sailed for the Far East. She arrived in Yokosuka and joined the 7th Fleet on 16 November 1964 to begin her duties as a unit of Fast Carrier Task Force 77.

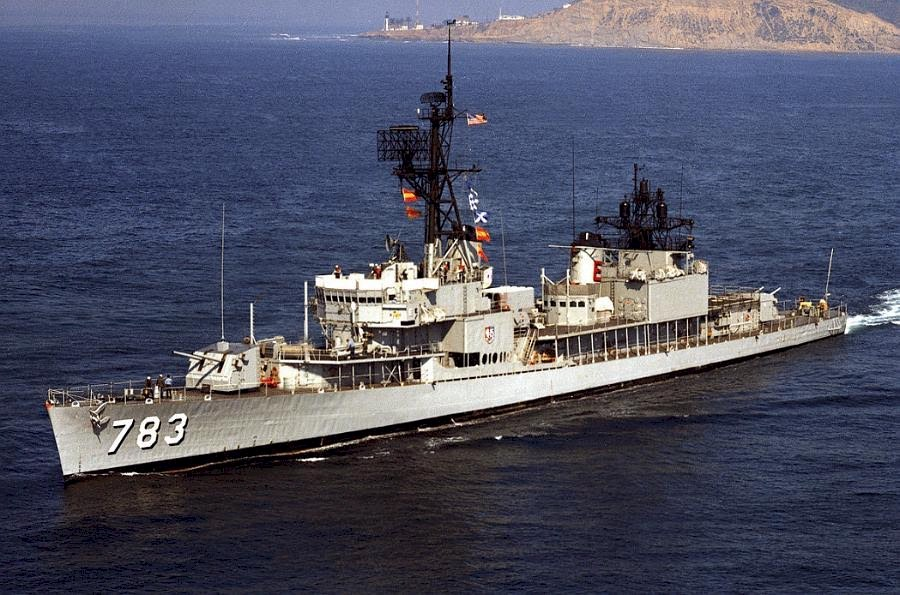
Gurke after her FRAM I-modernization.

The first day of 1965 found Gurke with Task Group 77.7 (TG 77.7) in the South China Sea. Long hours were spent on station, plane-guarding for attack carriers Ranger (CVA-61) and Hancock (CVA-19). As the Vietnam War became "hot" in late January she served as one of the escorts for an amphibious task group in the vicinity of Da Nang, South Vietnam. Long stretches at sea with fast carriers were punctuated by liberty calls at Subic Bay and Hong Kong. On 20 April 1965 the destroyer sailed in company with Ranger for return to San Diego, on 7 May 1965. The remainder of the year was filled with a rapid succession of coastwise training exercises ranging north to Seattle, which continued until she sailed for the western Pacific on 12 May 1966. After visiting Hawaii, Japan, and the Philippines, Gurke was stationed in the Gulf of Tonkin late in June for search and rescue duty. On 1 July three North Vietnamese PT boats were detected 11 miles (20 km) away from Gurke and three sister destroyers and closing at high speed. Fighter aircraft from Constellation (CV-64) intercepted the raiders and sank all three within minutes. The destroyers picked up 19 survivors for questioning.

While in the Gulf of Tonkin, Gurke refueled helicopters by a new in-flight refueling process enabling them to rescue American pilots downed in hostile territory.

After a brief respite in Hong Kong, Formosa, and the Philippines in August, Gurke resumed duty in the Gulf of Tonkin in September and set a record in completing 113 in-flight refuelings. On this assignment she bombarded Viet Cong positions in the Mekong and Saigon River deltas. After being relieved early in the fall, the destroyer returned home, via Okinawa and Japan, arriving San Diego on 16 November. In 1967, she operated along the West Coast and prepared for future action.

In November 1967 Gurke headed west again via Hawaii and Japan. She operated on Yankee Station, on search and rescue in the northern Gulf of Tonkin, and took part in the Formation Star effort in the Sea of Japan. Rushing south at the start of the 1968 Tet Offensive, she provided Naval Gunfire Support to the US Marines retaking Hue City. She then took some R&R in Hong Kong and participated in Sea Dragon operations along the North Vietnamese Coast. She returned to San Diego in June 1968 after an eight-month West Pac deployment. In April 1975 she participated in the evacuation of Saigon known as Operation Frequent Wind.In the fall of 1975 she embarked on the journey back to San Diego for decommissioning.She took a northerly route, first stopping at the naval base in Adak, Alaska for supplies. She then steamed down the coast, visiting Victoria, Canada along the way. Then came a visit to San Francisco before arriving at her final destination in San Diego.

=== 1977 - 1997 ===
Gurke was decommissioned and stricken from the Naval Vessel Register on 30 January 1976, and on 17 March 1977 she was transferred to Greece. On 20 March 1977 the ship was commissioned in the Hellenic Navy as Tombazis (D 215), the third ship named after Admiral Iakovos Tombazis.

Tombazis was fitted to serve as a flagship between 1980 and 1981, while the ship's armament was supplemented by the addition of an Otobreda 76 mm automatic gun on the helicopter deck and two twin launchers for Harpoon anti-ship missiles. Tombazis was withdrawn from active use by 1994, and stricken on 12 January 1997; as of January 1998, she was laid up in Souda Bay, Crete.

== Awards ==
Gurke received seven battle stars for service in the Korean War.
