= Lionel Daunais =

Canadian opera singer

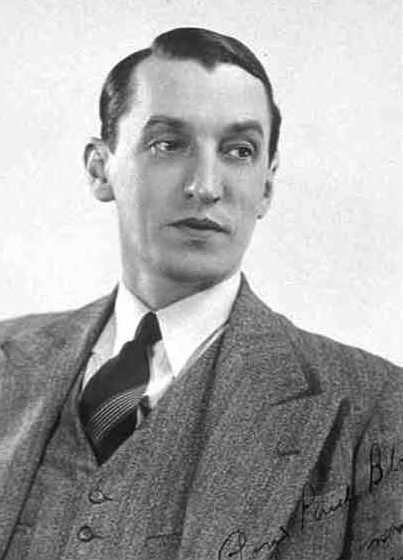
- Born: Noël Ferdinand Lionel Daunais; December 31, 1901; Montreal, Quebec, Canada
- Died: July 18, 1982 (aged 80)
- Occupations: baritone and composer
- Awards: Order of Canada

Noël Ferdinand Lionel Daunais, OC (December 31, 1901 – July 18, 1982) was a French Canadian baritone and composer.

== Life ==
Born in Montreal, Quebec, Daunais studied singing with Céline Marier and harmony and composition with Oscar O'Brien. In 1923, he won first prize at the Montreal Musical Festival. He made his professional opera debut in January 1926 as Ourrias in Charles Gounod's Mireille at the Orpheum in Vancouver. The following March he gave his first recital at the Ritz-Carlton Hotel.

Daunais was also awarded the Prix d'Europe in 1926 which provided him with the opportunity to pursue studies in Paris with Émile Marcellin at the Opéra-Comique. In 1929, he joined the roster of principal artists at the Opera of Algiers. With that company he sang several leading roles, including Escamillo in Carmen, Figaro in The Barber of Seville, Giorgio Germont in La traviata, Lescaut in Manon, and Valentin in Faust.

Upon his return to Canada in 1930, Daunais performed with the Bytown Troubadours at the third annual CPR Festivals in Quebec City. At the festival he also portrayed Samuel de Champlain in Healey Willan's The Order of Good Cheer. Later that year he made his debut with the Société canadienne d'opérette in Montreal as Clément Marot in André Messager's La Basoche. He performed frequently with that company through 1935.

In 1932, Daunais founded the Trio lyrique (TL) whose original members also included contralto Anna Malenfant and tenor Ludovic Huot. Jules Jacob replaced Huot in the early 1940s. Daunais recruited pianist and composer Allan McIver to serve as the group's accompanist and arranger. All of the arrangements performed during the TL's performance history were by McIver, including arrangements of many of Daunais's compositions.

In 1933, the TL was engaged by CRBC for its network series One Hour with You, on which the group performed for 87 weeks. In 1934, the TL released the LP album Chansons de Lionel Daunais for Radio Canada International. In 1936, the group performed for the CBS radio network in New York where McIver was also engaged as a staff arranger. The TL continued to perform actively in public concerts and on CBC Radio programs like The Play of the Week, Light Up and Listen. and Serenade for Strings up until the mid-1960s when it disbanded. The group re-united briefly in the autumn of 1971 for CBC broadcasts honoring Daunais and his work. In 1984, the album Le Trio lyrique chante Lionel Daunais was released; containing music from the ensemble's many radio broadcasts.

== Honours ==
- In 1965, he was awarded the Bene merenti de patria.
- In 1977, he was awarded the Calixa-Lavallée Award.
- In 1978, he was made an Officer of the Order of Canada.
- In 1982, he was awarded the Prix Denise-Pelletier.

== Discography (as a composer) ==
12 Chansons

- Lionel Daunais, baritone
- John Newmark, piano
- Radio-Canada International, RCI 107
- 1954

Transcription: Lionel Daunais

- Bruno Laplante, baritone
- Louis-Philippe Pelletier, piano
- Radio-Canada International, RCI 294
- 1971

D'amour et de fantaisie

- Lionel Daunais, baritone
- John Newmark, piano
- Sélect, CC-15.087
- 1974

Chansons de mon pays

- Ensemble Vocal Katimavik
- André Beaumier, choir conductor
- Société Nouvelle d'Enregistrement, SNE 502
- 1979 (1977?)

Anna Malenfant chante Lionel Daunais

- Anna Malenfant, contralto
- Janine Lachance, piano
- Société Nouvelle d'Enregistrement, SNE 511
- 1984

Lionel Daunais chante Lionel Daunais

- Lionel Daunais, baritone
- Janine Lachance and John Newmark, piano
- Société Nouvelle d'Enregistrement, SNE 512
- 1984

Le Trio Lyrique chante Lionel Daunais

- Trio Lyrique
- Allan McIver, piano
- Société Nouvelle d'Enregistrement, SNE 513
- 1984

Le Bestiaire

- Christine Lemelin, mezzo-soprano
- Réjean Coallier, piano
- Société Nouvelle d'Enregistrement, SNE 565
- 1990

Lionel Daunais : L'hommage de ses interprètes

- Lionel Daunais, baritone
- Anna Malenfant, contralto
- Trio Lyrique
- Janine Lachance and John Newmark, piano
- Box set, 5 CDs
- Fonovox, VOX-7839-2
- 1997

Airs Chantés – Fantaisie dans tous les tons

- Hélène Guilmette, soprano
- Delphine Bardin, piano
- Ambroisie, AMB 9971
- 2004

Le petit chien de laine

- Various performers
- Illustrated Book and CD
- La Montagne Secrète
- 2005

Lionel Daunais : Fantaisie dans tous les tons

- Chantal Lavigne, soprano
- Anne-Lise Longuemare, piano
- Atma Classique, ACD2 1016
- 2009

Hommage à Lionel Daunais

- Quatuor Kevoixsi
- CD Baby 5637680983
- 2010

75 ans 75 chansons – Radio-Canada 1936-2011

- Box set, 5 CDs
- Disques SRC
- 2011

La tourtière

- Jacqueline Woodley, soprano
- Annina Haug, mezzo-soprano
- Pierre Rancourt, baritone
- Marc Bourdeau, piano & arrangement
- CentreTracks, CD-CMCCT 11822
- 2022 (4 February)

Le voyage de noces

- Pierre Rancourt, baritone
- Marc Bourdeau, piano & arrangement
- CentreTracks, CD-CMCCT 11922
- 2022 (4 March)

Chanson des amours perdues

- Jacqueline Woodley, soprano
- Marc Bourdeau, piano
- CentreTracks, CD-CMCCT 12022
- 2022 (18 March)

LIONEL DAUNAIS mélodies . songs

- Jacqueline Woodley, soprano
- Annina Haug, mezzo-soprano
- Pierre Rancourt, baritone
- Michel Bellavance, flute
- Marc Bourdeau, piano & arrangement
- CentreDiscs, CD-CMCCD 30122
- 2022 (1 April)

== See also ==
- In Good Company album
