= Jeffrey Ryan =

Canadian composer (born 1962)

Jeffrey Ryan (born 1962) is a Canadian composer based in Vancouver, British Columbia. His compositional style ranges from opera, art song, and choral music to chamber ensemble and orchestral works. Ryan has been commissioned by the Cleveland Orchestra, the Windsor Symphony, Esprit Orchestra, Tapestry New Opera Works, the Arditti Quartet, and Elektra Women's Choir. Repeat performances have been presented by the Montreal Symphony Orchestra, the Winnipeg Symphony Orchestra, the Thunder Bay Symphony Orchestra, the Victoria Symphony, the Canadian Chamber Choir, the Florida Orchestra, and the South Dakota Symphony Orchestra, as well as a number of art song teams and chamber ensembles. He is an Associate Composer with the Canadian Music Centre.

== Early life and education ==
Ryan was born in Toronto, Ontario, Canada. He graduated with an honours bachelor of music degree from the Wilfrid Laurier University and the gold medal in music. After earning a master's degree in composition from the University of Toronto, he went on to receive his doctor of musical arts degree in composition from the Cleveland Institute of Music, where he studied with Donald Erb. Previous teachers include Alexina Louie, Lothar Klein, Mariano Etkin, Boyd McDonald, and Owen Underhill.

== Career ==
Since 1997, Ryan has been Composer Advisor for Music Toronto. He was an Affiliate Composer with the Toronto Symphony Orchestra from 2000 to 2002; he then served as the Vancouver Symphony Orchestra's Composer-in-Residence from 2002 to 2007, and continues as Composer Laureate of that ensemble.

Ryan and has been a featured composer with various festivals in Canada and the United States, including Soundstreams, Canada's Encounters series, the Winnipeg Symphony New Music Festival, Brandon New Music, the Strings of the Future festival, and Bowling Green State University's New Music and Art Festival.

In 2018, Ryan's work "Angeline on Ossabaw" was performed as part of the Luminous Voices concert in Calgary.

== Awards and recordings ==
Ryan was twice nominated for a Juno Award for Classical Composition of the Year (for Quantum Mechanics in 2008 and Pangaea in 2005, the latter recorded by the Thunder Bay Symphony Orchestra conducted by Music Director Geoffrey Moull). His works have also been recorded by the Bowling Green Philharmonia (Ophélie), the Hannaford Street Silver Band (She Threw It Down, Anathema), the Penderecki Quartet (String Quartet #3), the Canadian Chamber Choir (Angeline on Ossabaw and After Storm), and Tyler Duncan and Erika Switzer (the song cycle Everything Already Lost).
