= Anna Malenfant =

Canadian opera singer

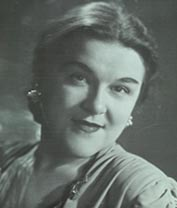

Background information
- Born: October 16, 1902; Shediac, New Brunswick, Canada
- Died: June 15, 1988 (aged 85) Montreal, Quebec, Canada
- Genres: Opera
- Instrument: Singing

Anna Malenfant (October 16, 1902 – June 15, 1988) was a Canadian singer, educator and composer.

== Early years and career ==
Malenfant was born in Shediac, New Brunswick. She began her career with a performance of The Mikadoin Moncton. She received a bursary that allowed her to study at the New England Conservatory of Music; she went on to study with Félia Litvinne in Paris and with Massimiliano Perilli in Naples. On her return to North America in 1929, she sang on radio station WITC in Hartford, Connecticut for a year under the name Louise Malmont. She studied with Salvator Issaurel in Montreal from 1930 to 1939. In 1932, with Ludovic Huot and Lionel Daunais, she founded the Trio lyrique. She performed with the Société des concerts symphoniques de Montréa (later the Montreal Symphony Orchestra). Malenfant performed in a number of operas, including Carmen, Werther and Boris Godunov. After 1944, she mainly performed in recitals and also taught. In 1958, she received a Canada Council grant which allowed her to further develop her vocal technique in Rome. She composed several songs published under the name Marie Lebrun which were inspired by the area where she was born in New Brunswick.

== Death ==
Malenfant died in Montreal at the age of 85.

== Legacy ==
École Anna-Malenfant in Dieppe, New Brunswick was named in Malenfant's honour.

In 2001, a documentary about Malenfant titled Anna Malenfant d'Acadie was produced based on archival material .
