= Julia Davids =

Canadian singer

Julia Davids née Olson (born March 17, 1972) is a founding member and artistic director of the Canadian Chamber Choir. She is the music director of the North Shore Choral Society.

== Early life ==
Davids was born and raised in London, Ontario.

== Education ==
She has two degrees from the University of Western Ontario (B.Mus.Hons.Ed. and B.Ed.), two master's degrees from the University of Michigan (Voice Performance and Conducting), and a Doctorate in Music from Northwestern University.

== Career ==
Davids is a performer, educator, and conductor. As a soprano soloist, she is an avid performer, having appeared with the Amabile Youth Singers, the Ontario Youth Choir and the National Youth Choir, Opera Atelier, the Vancouver Cantata Singers, the Toronto Chamber Choir, the Toronto Consort, the Guelph Chamber Choir, the Aradia Ensemble, the Forces of Virtue, the Peninsula Music Festival, the Publick Musick and the Mark Morris Dance Company in Chicago.

As an educator, Julia has given workshops on vocal pedagogy with many groups, including the Royal Canadian Guild of Organists. She has served on the faculty at Loyola University Chicago, and currently is Director of Choral Activities at North Park University in Chicago, IL.

As a conductor, Dr. Davids has directed several choirs including the Canadian Chamber Choir, the Northwestern University Women's Chorus, the Camerata Singers of Lake Forest, the 2006 Nova Scotia Youth Choir tour.

In 2004, Davids took over from Iwan Edwards as the Artistic Director of Canadian Chamber Choir.

She served as the final director of the Camerata Singers of Lake Forest from 2004-2008.

Davids serves as Director of Music Ministries at Trinity United Methodist Church in Wilmette, Illinois. She is married to baroque violinist Martin Davids.

Beginning in August 2010 Dr. Davids will assume the Stephen J. Hendrickson endowed chair as director of Choral Activities at North Park University, Chicago.

In addition, in 2009, Dr. Davids took over as director of the North Shore Choral Society a 140-member community chorus, has been a prominent musical force serving the northern suburbs of Chicago, Illinois, and beyond for over 75 years.

She is co-author with Stephen LaTour of the book Vocal Technique – A Guide for Conductors, Teachers, and Singers.

In August 2016 Dr. Davids was the guest conductor/director of the Nova Scotia Choral Federation (NSCF) Adult Choir Camp Choir, which involved a 6-day intensive rehearsal schedule and finale concert.
