= USS Saint Paul (CA-73) =

Heavy cruiser of the United States Navy

Coordinates: 44.9441407°N 93.0938141°W

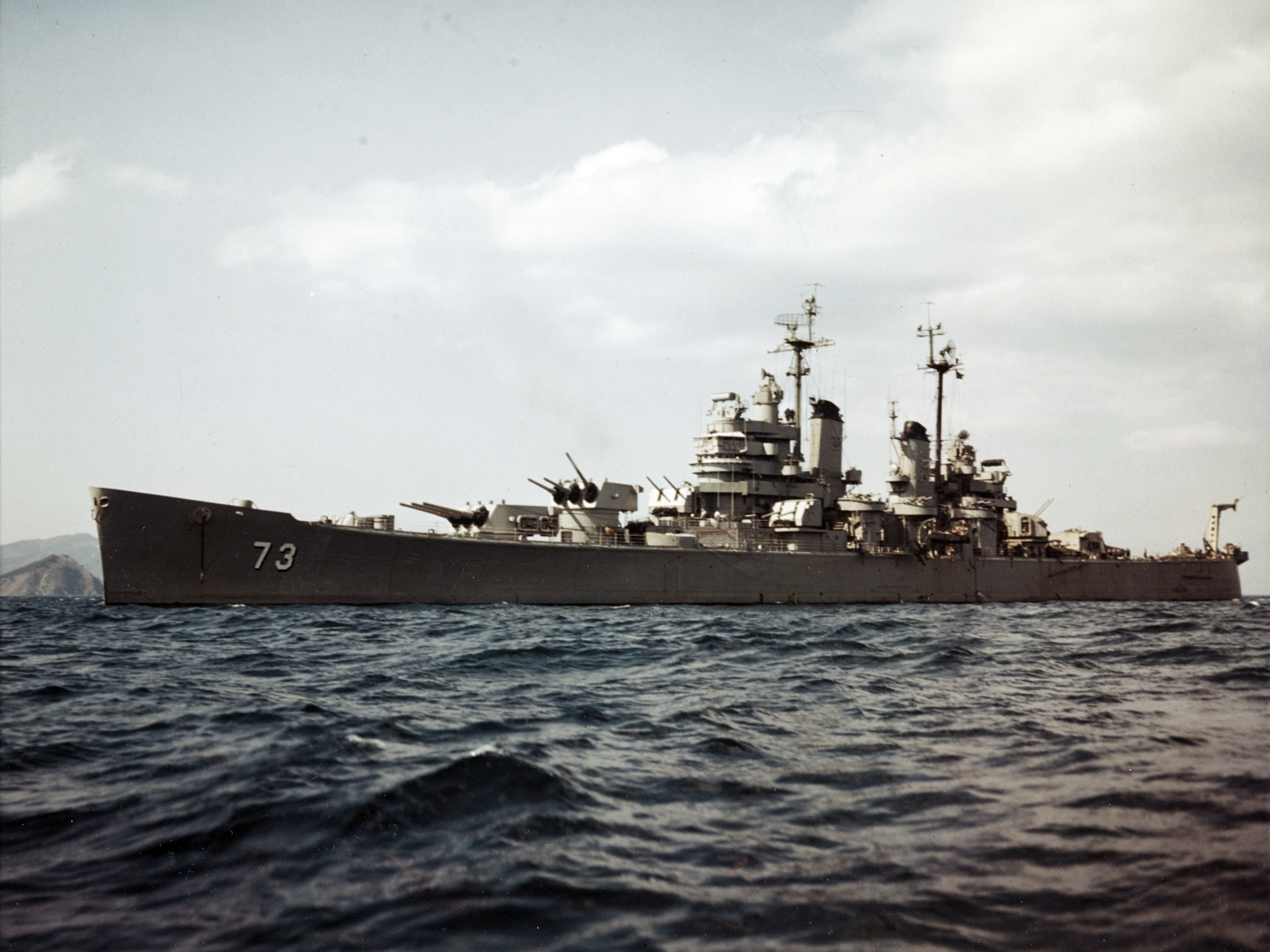
- USS Saint Paul off Wonsan on 20 April 1951

History

United States
- Name: Saint Paul
- Namesake: City of Saint Paul, Minnesota
- Builder: Bethlehem Steel Company, Quincy, Massachusetts
- Laid down: 3 February 1943
- Launched: 16 September 1944
- Commissioned: 17 February 1945
- Decommissioned: 30 April 1971
- Stricken: 31 July 1978
- Identification: Callsign: NBYM; Hull number: CA-73
- Motto: Fighting Saints
- Honors and awards: See Awards
- Fate: Scrapped, 13 December 1979
- Notes: Bell is at St. Paul City Hall, 3rd Floor
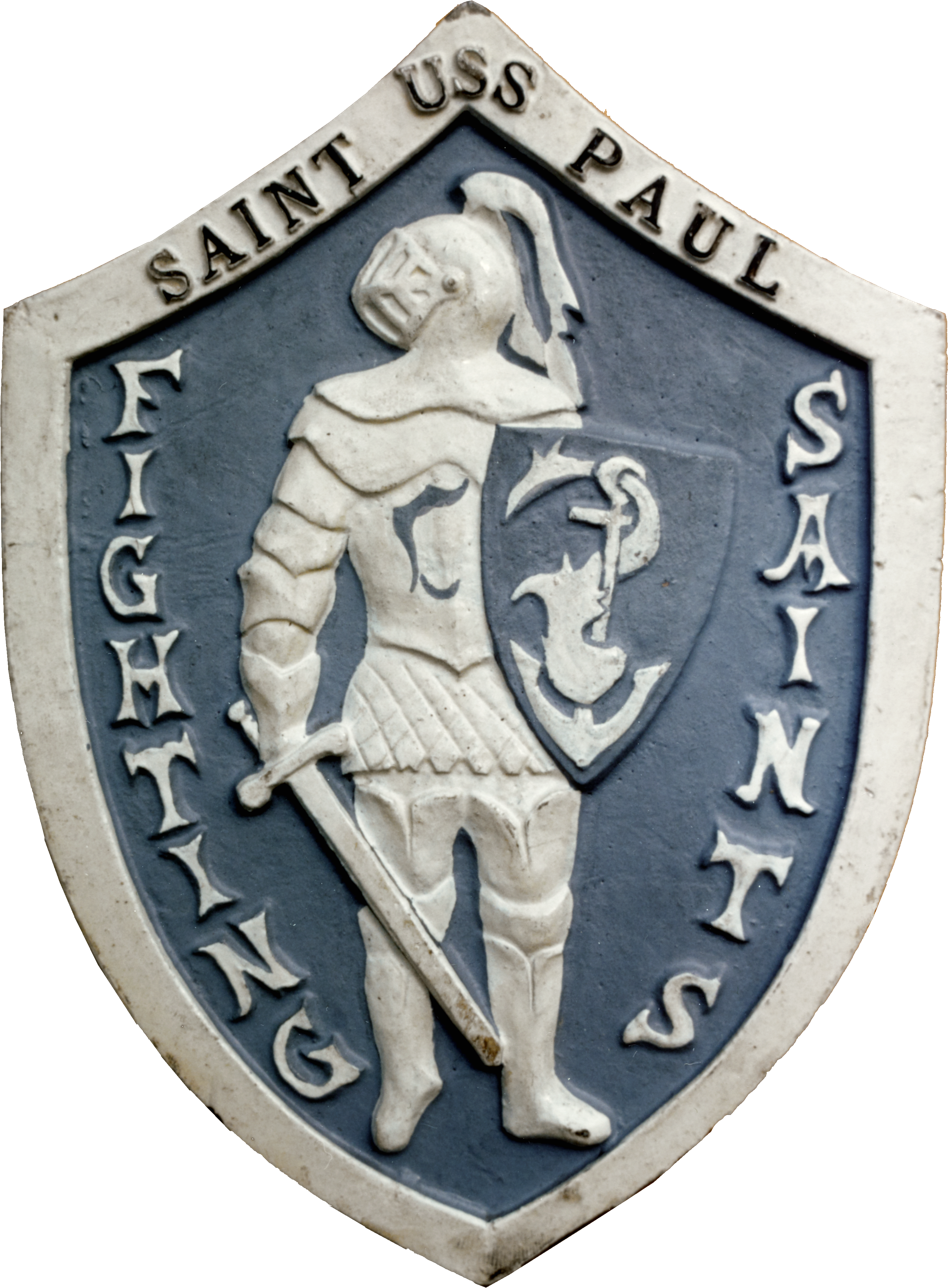
- Badge

General characteristics
- Class & type: Baltimore-class cruiser
- Displacement: 14,500 tons
- Length: 673 ft 5 in (205.26 m)
- Beam: 70 ft 10 in (21.59 m)
- Draft: 26 ft 5 in (8.05 m)
- Speed: 32 knots (59 km/h)
- Complement: 1700 officers and enlisted
- Armament: 9 × 8 in (203 mm)/55 cal guns; 12 × 5 in (127 mm)/38 cal guns; 48 × Bofors 40 mm guns; 22 × Oerlikon 20 mm cannons
- Aircraft carried: 4

USS Saint Paul (CA-73), a Baltimore-class cruiser, was the second ship of the United States Navy to be named for Saint Paul, Minnesota.

Her keel was laid down as Rochester on 3 February 1943 by the Bethlehem Steel Company in Quincy, Massachusetts. She was launched on 16 September 1944 sponsored by Mrs. Marie Gordon McDonough, wife of John J. McDonough, then mayor of Saint Paul; and commissioned on 17 February 1945. She was struck from the Naval Vessel Register on 31 July 1978, and was sold for scrapping in January 1980.

== Service history ==
=== World War II ===
After shakedown in the Caribbean Sea, Saint Paul departed Boston, Massachusetts, on 15 May 1945 and headed for the Pacific. From 8 to 30 June, she underwent training out of Pearl Harbor and sailed on 2 July to join Task Force 38 (TF 38). This fast carrier striking force completed replenishment at sea on 23 July and then proceeded to launching points for strikes against Honshū, Japan's largest island. From 24 July to 10 August, Saint Paul screened the carriers as they delivered heavy air strikes on Kure, Kobe, and the Tokyo area in southern Honshū, then at Maizuru and various airfields in northern Honshū. During this period, Saint Paul also bombarded industrial targets: first on textile mills at Hamamatsu during the night of 29 July, and then on 9 August at iron and steel works in Kamaishi, firing the war's last hostile salvo from a major ship. Typhoon warnings canceled air operations from 11 to 14 August. Then, those launched that morning were recalled, after peace negotiations gave promise of Japan's surrender. On 15 August, all offensive operations against Japan were stopped.

Saint Paul, with other units of the Third Fleet, retired to the southeast to patrol the coast while awaiting orders. On 27 August, she steamed into Sagami Wan to support United States occupation forces. On 1 September, she entered Tokyo Bay and was there during the formal surrender ceremony the next day.

=== Post-World War II ===
Saint Paul remained in Japanese waters for occupation duty until she was ordered to Shanghai on 5 November to become flagship of TF 73. She navigated the Huangpu River, anchored off the Shanghai Bund on 10 November; she remained there until early in 1946. On 21 December 1945 she was in collision with the Chinese (ex-Japanese) landing craft LST144, which was driven against the bow of Saint Paul by the force of the current. The landing craft sustained severe damage, the cruiser slight damage to the bow area.

On 7 January 1946, Saint Paul departed Shanghai in company with Keith and returned to the Naval Shipyard, Terminal Island, California, on 28 January 1946 for a brief refit to make good the collision damage. In May, the ship made a round trip to Pearl Harbor. Returning to Terminal Island on 1 August, she was overhauled to prepare for additional Far East duty. From 1 to 15 February 1947, she conducted refresher training at San Diego, California.

Following her return to Shanghai in March, Saint Paul resumed operations as flagship for TF 71 until returning to the United States in November. Next, came training operations along the West Coast, including cruises for Naval Reservists from April–May. From August–December, she deployed to the western Pacific, serving in Japanese and Chinese waters. Back in the United States, she was converted from catapult to helicopter configuration before serving again in the Far East from April through October 1949.

=== Korean War ===
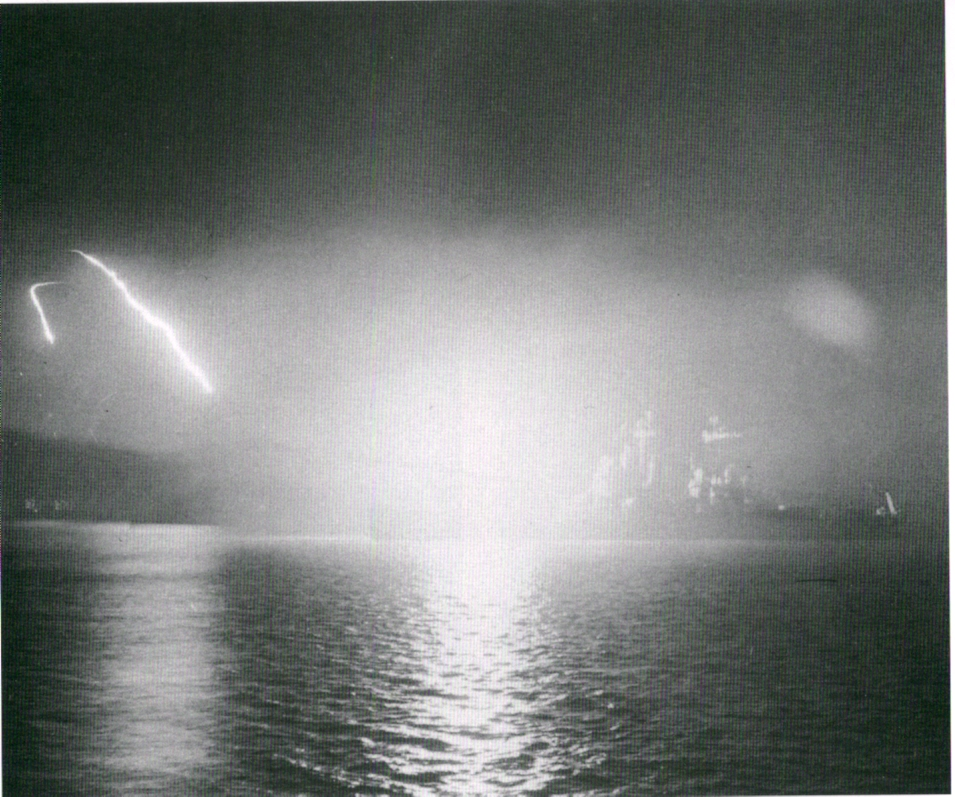
Saint Paul fires her 8-inch 55-caliber (203-mm) guns at Chinese troops threatening the evacuation of United Nations forces from Hungnam, North Korea, in December 1950.

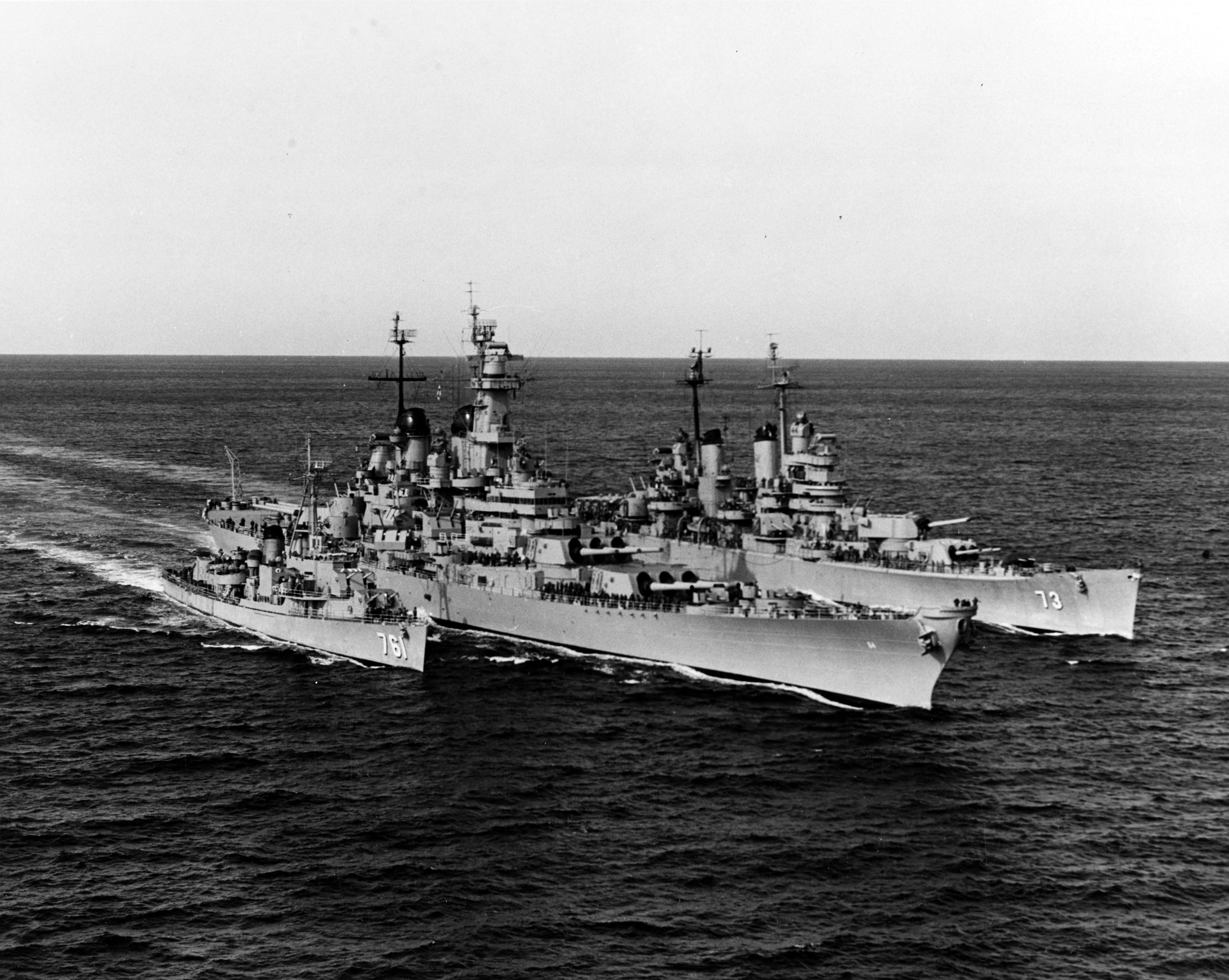
The destroyer USS Buck (DD-761), battleship USS Wisconsin (BB-64), and Saint Paul steam in close formation during operations off the Korean coast in 1952.

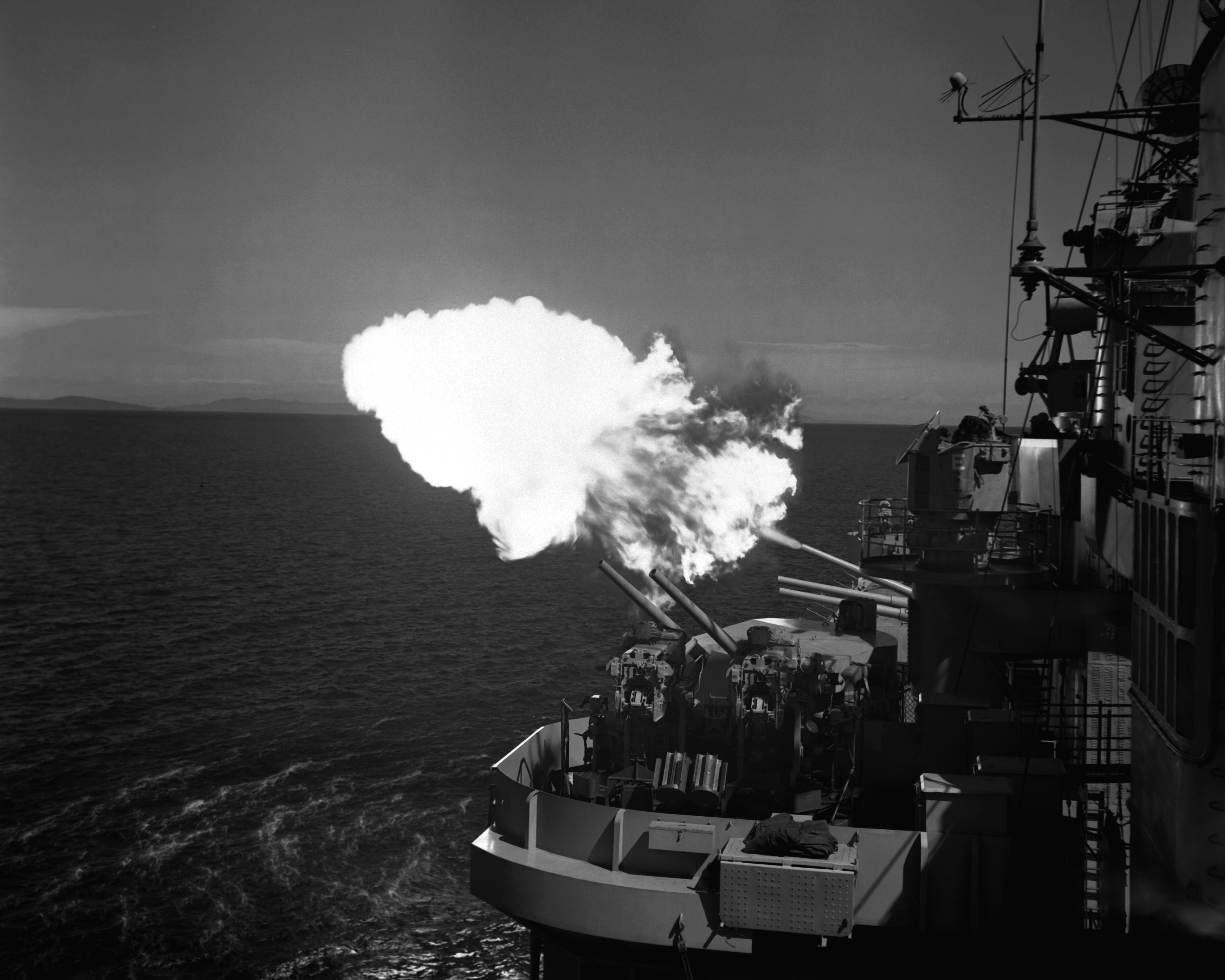
Saint Paul firing at Korean coastal batteries in 1953.

When hostilities broke out in the Korean War in June 1950, Saint Paul was conducting a midshipman training cruise from San Francisco, California, to Pearl Harbor. She disembarked the future naval officers and proceeded late in July to the western Pacific where she joined Task Group 77.3 (TG 77.3) on patrol in the Formosa Strait. Saint Paul remained on patrol between Formosa and mainland China from 27 August to 1 November. She then moved north into the Sea of Japan to join TF 77, and commenced combat operations off the northeast coast of Korea on 9 November. On 17 November, she provided gunfire support to the United Nations troops advancing on Chongjin. That day, shrapnel from a near miss by a shell from a Communist shore battery injured six men at gun mount stations. The cruiser destroyed the enemy emplacement with counter-battery fire and continued her support mission.

As the Chinese Communists began massive attacks late in November, United Nations forces commenced a general withdrawal to consolidate and hold south of the 38th parallel. Saint Paul provided close support for the Republic of Korea I Corps on their east flank as they withdrew from Hapsu, and along the coast, as they retired from Chongjin. On 2 December, she moved north again, conducted night harassing missions above Chongjin, then moved south to support the withdrawal of the Republic of Korea Capital Division to Kyongsong Man. She entered the harbor at Wonsan on 3 December to provide a curtain of shellfire around that city as United Nations forces and equipment were moved to Hungnam; then followed the forces there, and remained to cover the evacuation of that city and harbor between 10 December and 24 December. (The now restored SS Lane Victory was one of the ships protected by her cover fire.)

From 21 to 31 January 1951, Saint Paul conducted shore bombardment missions north of Inchon where, on 26 January, she was again fired upon by shore batteries. On 7 April, in TF 74, with Wallace L. Lind, Massey, Fort Marion and Begor, Saint Paul helped to carry out raids on rail lines and tunnels utilizing 250 commandos of the 41st Independent Royal Marines. These highly successful destructive raids slowed down the enemy's resupply efforts, forcing the Communists to attempt to repair or rebuild the rail facilities by night while hiding the work crews and locomotives in tunnels by day.

Saint Paul returned to the United States for yard work at San Francisco, California, from June to September, then conducted underway training before sailing on 5 November for Korea. She arrived off Wonsan on 27 November and commenced gun strike missions in support of the UN blockade. During the following weeks, she bombarded strategic points at Hungnam, Songjin, and Chongjin. In December, she served as an antiaircraft escort for TF 77, and, following a holiday trip to Japan, returned to operations off the coast of North Korea. In April 1952, Saint Paul participated in combined air-sea attacks against the ports of Wonsan and Chongjin.

On 21 April, while the cruiser was engaged in gun fire support operations, a sudden and serious powder fire broke out in her forward 8-inch (203 mm) turret. Thirty men died. The explosion occurred in the turret's left gun, which was loaded but had the breech open. The gun captain thought the weapon had fired and told the gun's rammerman to ram another projectile into the gun's breech. The gun blew up, setting off two other powder bags in the powder hoist.

Before returning to Japan for repairs, however, Saint Paul carried out gunstrikes on railroad targets near Songjin, during which she captured nine North Koreans from a small boat. Following a brief stay in port and two weeks on the gun line, she headed home and reached Long Beach, California, on 24 June.

On 28 February 1953, Saint Paul departed the West Coast for her third Korean tour and was in action again by April. In mid-June, she assisted in the recapture of Anchor Hill. With New Jersey, she provided close support to the Korean Army in a ground assault on this key position south of Kosong. The cruiser was fired upon many times by 75 mm and 105 mm guns, and observed numerous near misses, some only ten yards away. But on 11 July at Wonsan, she received her only direct hit from a shore battery. No one was wounded, and only her 3-inch (76.2 mm) antiaircraft mount was damaged. On 27 July, at 2159, she conducted her last gunstrike and had the distinction of firing the last round shot at sea in the war. The shell, autographed by Rear Admiral Harry Sanders, was fired at an enemy gun emplacement. The truce was effective at 2200. Saint Paul then commenced patrol duties along the east coast of Korea.

=== Post-Korea ===
Saint Paul returned to the western Pacific again in May 1954; and, later that year, she was on hand when the Chinese Communists were threatening the Nationalist Chinese islands of the Quemoy Islands group. From 19 November 1954 to 12 July 1955, she operated with the 7th Fleet in Japanese and Chinese waters, particularly between Taiwan and mainland China, playing a major role in protecting United States interests in the Far East. She returned to Long Beach, California, for repairs and an overhaul which included enclosing the command and flag bridge levels. Following this work she was back in the western Pacific from 15 August 1955 to 10 January 1956 serving as flagship for the 7th Fleet.

Saint Paul returned to Long Beach, California, in February and subsequently moved to Bremerton, Washington, for upkeep and overhaul. This overhaul period included removing the forward 5" gun turret and adding a large deck house between the funnels to accommodate enhanced flagship facilities. This work was completed by late summer, and in September, she became flagship for the 1st Fleet and entertained the Secretary of the Navy during a fleet review at Long Beach. She departed that port on 6 November; and, after refresher training at San Diego, California, arrived at Yokosuka, Japan, on 29 September to relieve Rochester as 7th Fleet flagship. She spent most of her time in Keelung or Kaohsiung, Taiwan, with periods of training in the Philippines and port calls at Buckner Bay, Hong Kong, Manila, and Sasebo. On 26 April 1957, she headed home.

Saint Paul arrived at Long Beach, California, on 21 May and subsequently cruised along the West Coast, as far north as Seattle, Washington, until she sailed once more on 3 February 1958 for the Far East. She made an extensive cruise beginning at Pearl Harbor. Thence she steamed to Wellington, New Zealand; proceeded past Guadalcanal and north through the Solomon Islands to New Georgia; visited the Caroline Islands; and ended at Yokosuka on 9 March. She repeated her past WestPac deployments with duties as flagship, and exercises in the Philippines, before returning to Long Beach on 25 August for maintenance and upkeep. Sailing from Long Beach, California, on 4 May 1959, Saint Paul became the first major United States Navy ship to be homeported in the Far East since before World War II. Based at Yokosuka, she did not return to Long Beach until 39 months later.

In late 1963 through summer 1964, as one of the only World War II cruisers still in commission and still in her wartime all-gun configuration (several others were in commission, but had been extensively modernized into guided missile cruisers), Saint Paul was extensively used in the filming of the motion picture In Harm's Way, starring John Wayne. In the movie, it is apparent that the ship has been slightly modified according to the standard of the Baltimore class – the front 5-inch gun turret has been removed, leading to the larger gap between the bridge and second 8-inch gun turret, so in the movie the cruiser no longer has 12 5-inch guns, but only 10 5-inch guns. In addition, her original 40 mm quadruple mounts had been replaced with 3-inch twin mounts. The ship was never mentioned by her actual name (her large hull number on the bow was painted over), but was simply referred to as "Old Swayback" and was supposedly commanded by Wayne's character as a captain, served as his flagship as a rear admiral, and was later sunk during a crucial battle with the Japanese.

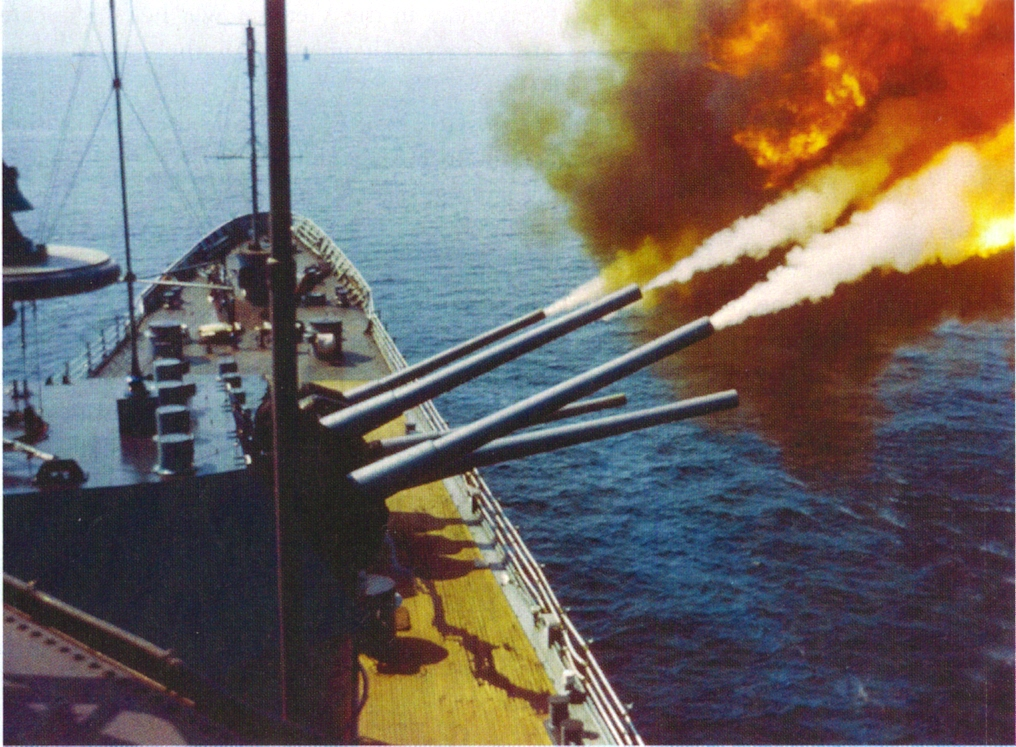
St. Paul's forward 8"/55 caliber (203-mm) guns fire at enemy targets ashore in North Vietnam in October 1966 during the Vietnam War.

After her movie filming stint was over, she assumed duties as 1st Fleet flagship and did not return to WestPac until 1966. From that year, she made five successful deployments with the 7th Fleet in operations off North and South Vietnam, providing gunfire support to allied troops. Reminiscent of her Korean operations, Saint Paul was hit on 1 September 1967 by a shell which struck her starboard bow, near the water line. None of her crew was injured; and her engineers repaired the slight damage, enabling her to continue her mission. For her service, Saint Paul earned the Navy Unit Commendation and two Meritorious Unit Commendations.

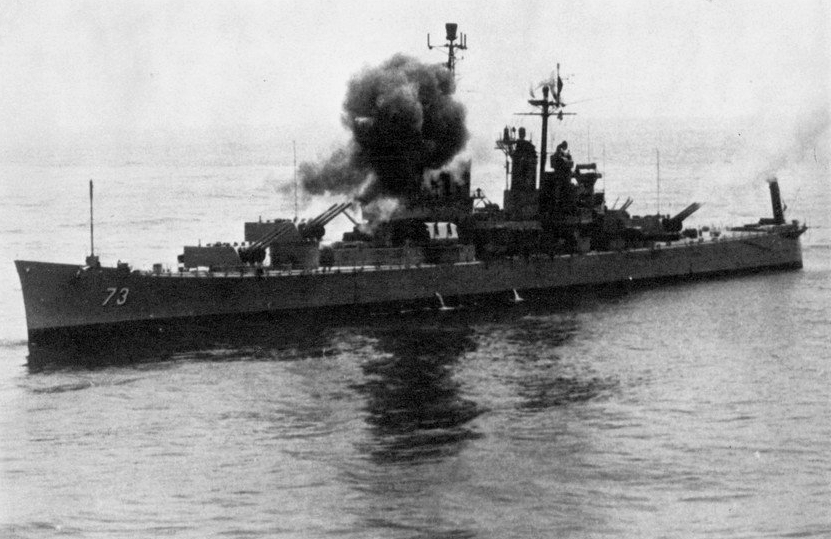
Saint Paul shelling Vietnam in 1969.

At San Diego, California on 7 December 1970, Saint Paul began inactivation procedures. She sailed to Bremerton, Washington, on 1 February 1971, where she was decommissioned on 30 April after 26 continuous years of active service to her country, and was placed in reserve with the Puget Sound Group of the Pacific Reserve Fleet.

Saint Paul was the last all-gun Baltimore-class cruiser in US Navy service while Chicago and Columbus soldiered on until 1980 as Albany-class guided missile cruisers.

Struck from the Naval Vessel Register on 31 July 1978, Saint Paul was sold for scrapping in January 1980.

Saint Paul's ship's bell is now displayed in Saint Paul City Hall on the third floor between the city council and mayoral offices, in an area also containing a listing of the United States Naval Reserve personnel from Saint Paul who served aboard the destroyer USS Ward (DD-139) when she fired the first American shots of World War II.

== Awards ==
- Combat Action Ribbon with two gold stars
- Navy Unit Commendation
- Meritorious Unit Commendation with star
- Asiatic-Pacific Campaign Medal with one battle star
- World War II Victory Medal
- Navy Occupation Medal with "ASIA" clasp
- China Service Medal
- National Defense Service Medal with star
- Korean Service Medal with eight battle stars
- Vietnam Service Medal with nine battle stars
- Korean Presidential Unit Citation
- Vietnam Cross of Gallantry with palm
- United Nations Korea Medal
- Korean War Service Medal
- Republic of Vietnam Campaign Medal
