= Vrba (Tutin) =

Vrba Врба
- Village (Selo)
- Location within Serbia
- Coordinates: 42°52′N 20°21′E
- Country: Serbia
- District: Raška District
- Municipality: Tutin

Population (2002)
  - Total: 196 ▼
- Time zone: UTC+1 (CET)
  - Summer (DST): UTC+2 (CEST)

Vrba is a village in the municipality of Tutin, Serbia. According to the 2002 census, the village has a population of 196 people (a small decline since the 1990s). Over 90% of them are Bosniaks.

== Name ==
The name of this village means "willow" in the natively spoken Serbian language
