= Cenek J. Vrba =

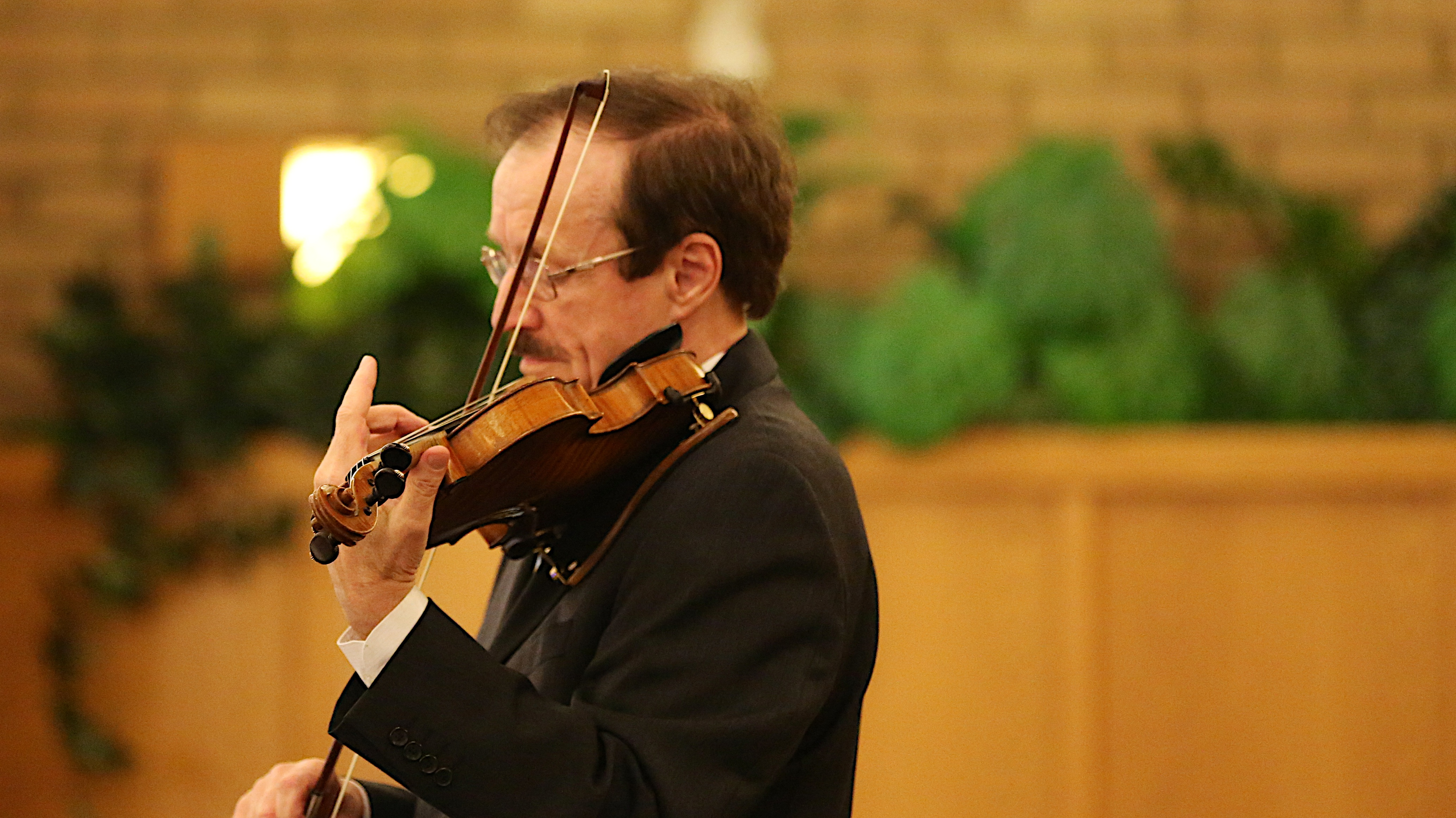
- Cenek Vrba performing in April 2013

Cenek J. Vrba (born 11 April 1947 in Brno, Czechoslovakia) is a violinist and concertmaster of the Calgary Philharmonic Orchestra between 1975 and 2011. He is one of Canada's foremost violinists, being described as a "True inheritor of the Czech string tradition…violinist of a rare distinction". (Tokyo – Japan).

He began music training at the age of eight and six years later, he joined the state music conservatory. Later he attended the music academy. He won prizes including the first place in the Beethoven National Violin Competition. He went on to play with the Czechoslovakia Symphony Orchestra, before leaving Czechoslovakia due to the Warsaw Pact invasion of Czechoslovakia.

After immigrating to the city of Calgary, Alberta, Canada in 1968, he pursued further studies in the United States and Europe. While a senior at the University of Calgary in 1970 he won the Greater Spokane Music and Allied Arts Festival Grand Award. After two years at Calgary, Vrba moved to Indiana in order to continue his studies. Vrba went on to play First Violin with the Toronto Symphony Orchestra, where he stayed for four years.

Vrba was appointed concert master of the Calgary Philharmonic Orchestra in August 1975. He remained there for 36 years until his retirement in 2011.

Vrba is a member of the Church of Jesus Christ of Latter-day Saints (LDS Church).
