= Mennonite Collegiate Institute =

Location
- 123 Main Street; Gretna, Manitoba; Canada

Information
- Former names: Mennonite Educational Institute, Die Mennonitische Bildungsanstalt, Die Mennonitische Lehranstalt
- Type: Private secondary
- Established: 1889
- Closed: August, 2025
- Grades: 9–12,
- Enrollment: 56 (2022)
- Website: mciblues.net

Mennonite Collegiate Institute (MCI) was a private Christian high school located in Gretna, Manitoba, Canada. The school body ranged from 50 to 200 students in grades 9 through 12, offering a curriculum that integrates Manitoba provincial education standards with faith-based learning. It is known for promoting Anabaptist values such as peacebuilding, community, and service.

== History ==
The Mennonite Collegiate Institute (MCI), originally known as the Mennonitische Bildungsanstalt (Mennonite Educational Institute, MEI) was founded by the MEI School Society in 1888. Opening its doors in Gretna, Manitoba in 1889 under the direction of teacher Wilhelm Rempel, the school's primary mandate was the training of Mennonite elementary school teachers. An increasing number of Mennonite parents came to value education beyond basic arithmetic and literacy skills, and sent their children to the institute for the more general purpose of acquiring a good education in a Christian context.

The Board of Directors determined that MCI will pause school operations effective June 30, 2025. This decision followed significant financial strain, a steady decline in enrollment, and a governance model that had become increasingly unsustainable. In August 2025, MCI announced they were closing their doors permanently.

== Programs ==
MCI offered a comprehensive high school curriculum with additional emphasis on music, choir, performing arts, leadership, and Mennonite studies. Students participate in drama productions through Cottonwood Community Drama, musical theatre programs, and the “Wild Wednesday” outdoor education initiative.

The school has run a Hockey Skills Academy and other athletic opportunities.

== Community and faith ==
Faith based learning was a key part of MCI's operations, with daily chapel services, student-led worship, and service-learning experiences. The school collaborated with local churches and hosted spiritual retreats.

The school is home to Buhler Hall, a venue for concerts and community events.

== Student life ==
MCI hosted fundraising initiatives like the annual Golf Classic and community events such as “Soup, Pie & a Concert.” Recent media coverage has included their theatre productions, new principal announcements, and graduation ceremonies.

Many of the students who attend MCI lived in the attached residence, which was open to students in Grades 9 through 12.

== Notable alumni ==
- Rick Neufeld, musician
- Jack Thiessen, lexicographer
