= Gretna, Manitoba =

Unincorporated urban community in the Canadian province of Manitoba

Coordinates: 49°00′28″N 97°33′42″W

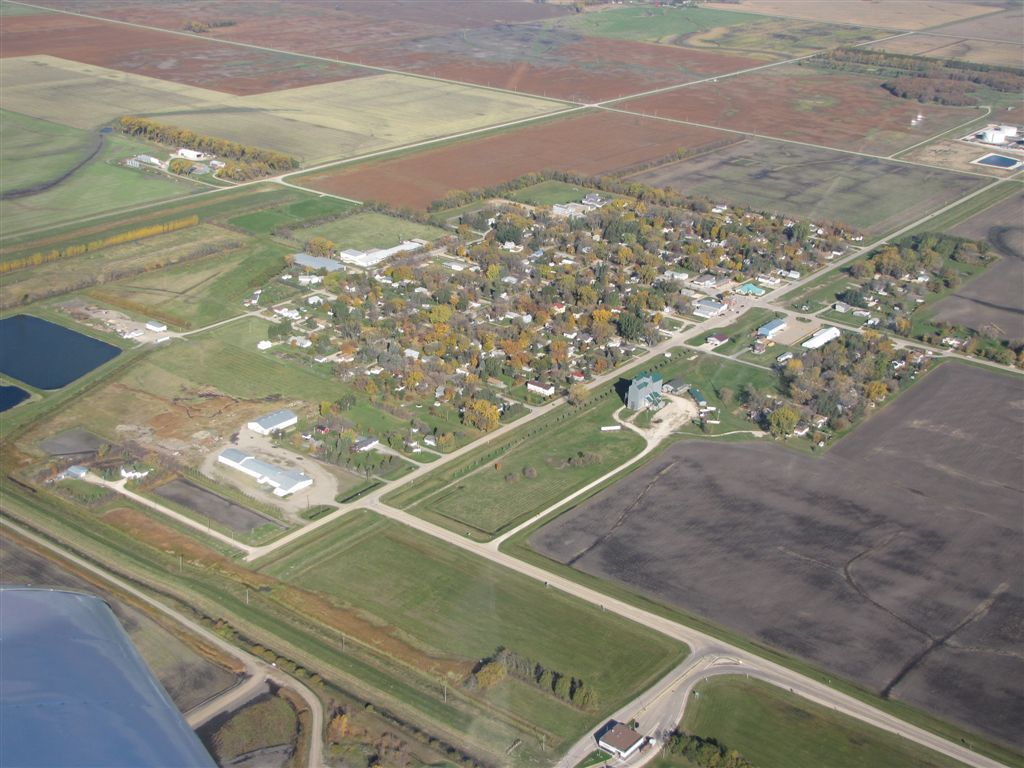
Aerial view of Gretna

Gretna is an unincorporated urban community in the Municipality of Rhineland within the Canadian province of Manitoba that held town status prior to January 1, 2015. Just north of the Canada - United States border on PTH 30, Gretna had a population of 541 in 2016. It is bordered by Pembina County, North Dakota. The nearest American community to Gretna is Neche, North Dakota.

== History ==
Once home to roaming Buffalo herds, the area around Gretna attracted European settlers as far back as the early 19th century.

In 1889, Mennonite Collegiate Institute, a private high school, opened in Gretna. In 1897, Gretna and area was visited by Russian prince and anarchist Peter Kropotkin who praised the local Mennonites for their industriousness and communal lifestyle.

On June 4, 2021, Gretna reached a temperature of 41.3 °C (106.3 °F), the highest recorded temperature in Manitoba since the 1980s and the earliest in the year occurrence of above 40 °C (104 °F) temperatures in Canada.

== Demographics ==
In the 2021 Census of Population conducted by Statistics Canada, Gretna had a population of 511 living in 197 of its 210 total private dwellings, a change of -5.5% from its 2016 population of 541. With a land area of 2.71 km^{2} (1.05 sq mi), it had a population density of 188.6/km^{2} (488.4/sq mi) in 2021.

== Notable people ==
- Rick Neufeld, musician
- A. E. van Vogt, 20th century sci-fi author, was born in Edenburg, a small (now defunct) village 2 miles east of Gretna.
- Enoch Winkler, politician
- Hal Winkler, former NHL player

== See also ==
- Neche–Gretna Border Crossing
- List of oil pipelines
