= Economy of Minnesota =

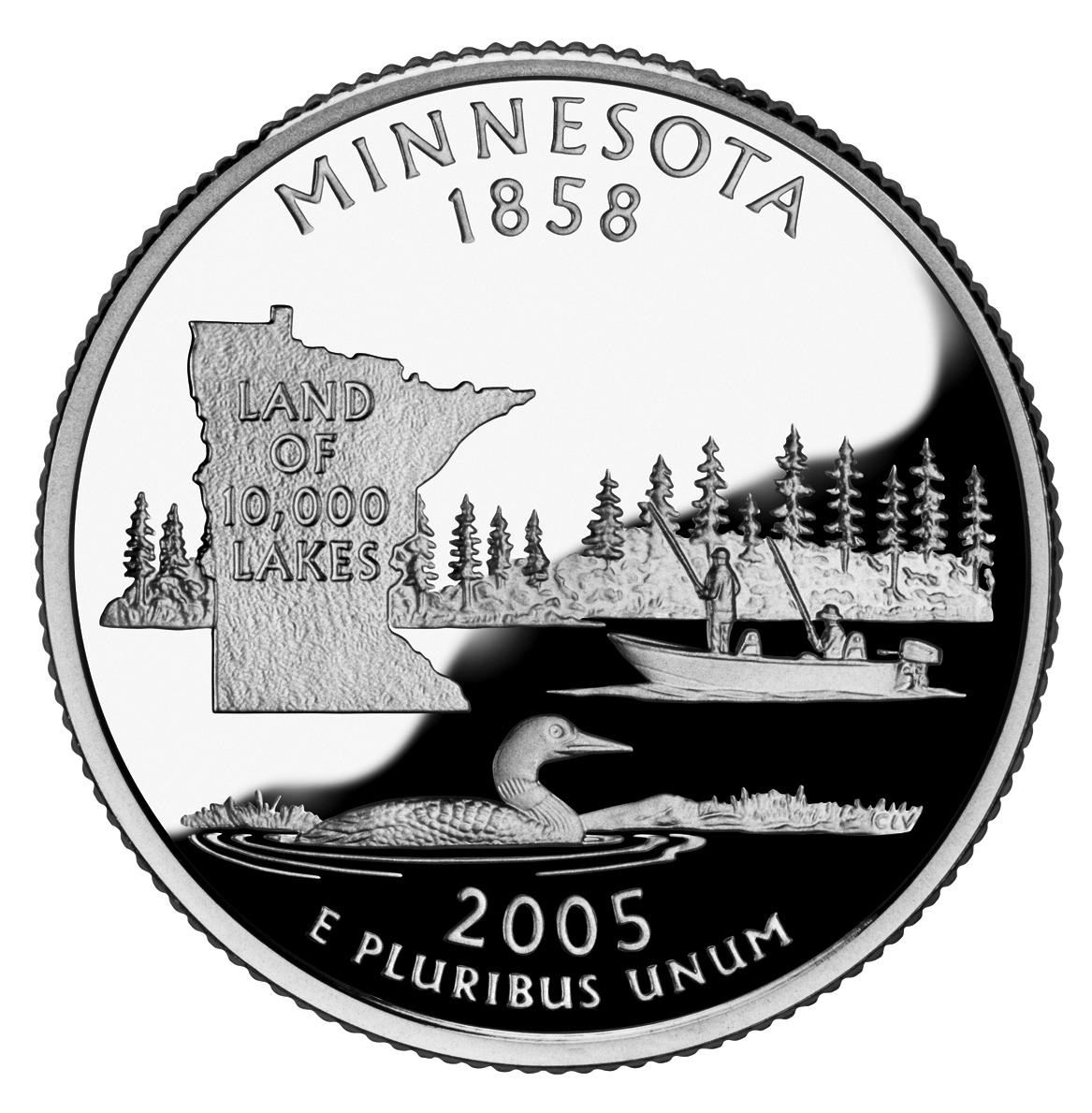
- State quarter

Statistics
- GDP: $399.3 billion (2024)
- GDP per capita: $62,005 (2020)
- Population below national poverty line: 9.6% (2023)
- Gini coefficient: 0.4434 (2023)
- Labor force: 3,108,458 (2022)
- Unemployment: 3.5% (November 2024)

Public finance
- Revenue: $67.7 billion (FY 2022–23)
- Spending: $51.6 billion (FY 2022–23)

The economy of Minnesota produced US$472 billion of gross domestic product in 2023. Minnesota headquartered 15 Fortune 500 companies in 2023, the largest of which were UnitedHealth Group (5th) and Target (33rd). The per capita personal income in 2022 was $60,785, ranking ninth in the nation. The median household income in 2023 was $82,338.

== Industry and commerce ==
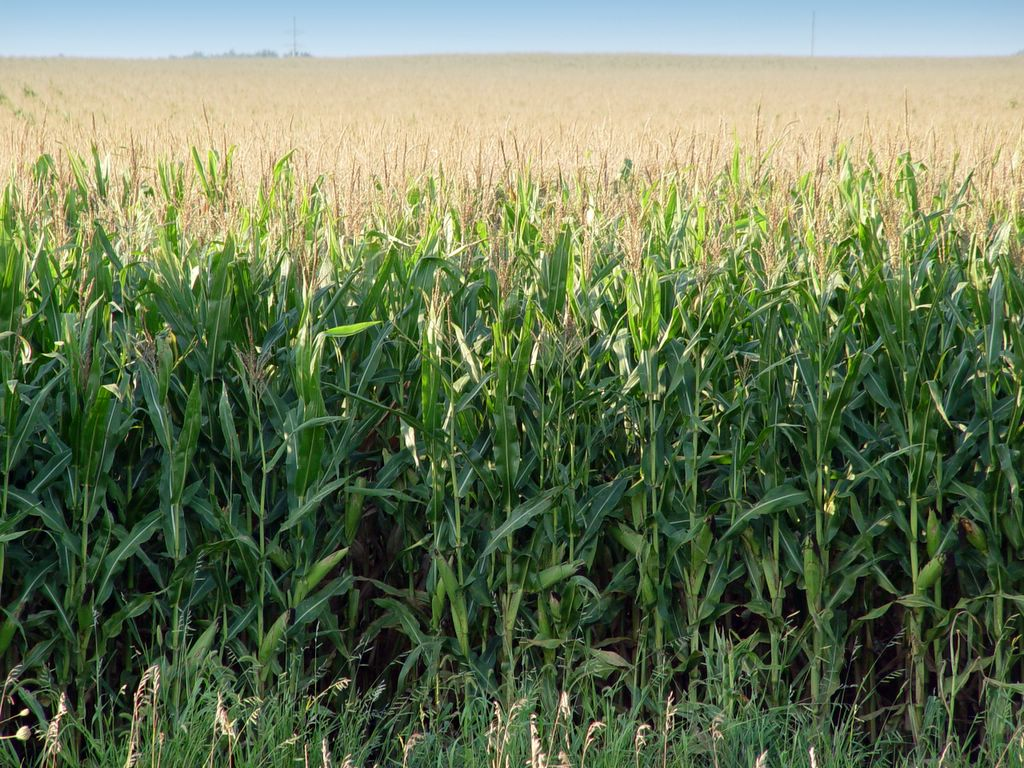
Corn field

Minnesota's economy has transformed in the past 200 years from one based on raw materials to one based on finished products and services.

The earliest industries were fur trading and agriculture. Agriculture is still a major part of the economy even though only a small percentage of the population, less than 1%, are employed in the farming industry.

In the Blufflands, cheese, wine, honey, milk, apples, and maple syrup are produced.

Minnesota is the U.S.'s largest producer of sugar beets, sweet corn, and green peas for processing and farm-raised turkeys. State agribusiness has changed from production to processing and the manufacturing of value-added food products by companies such as General Mills, Cargill, Hormel Foods Corporation (prepackaged and processed meat products), and the McDonald Food Company.

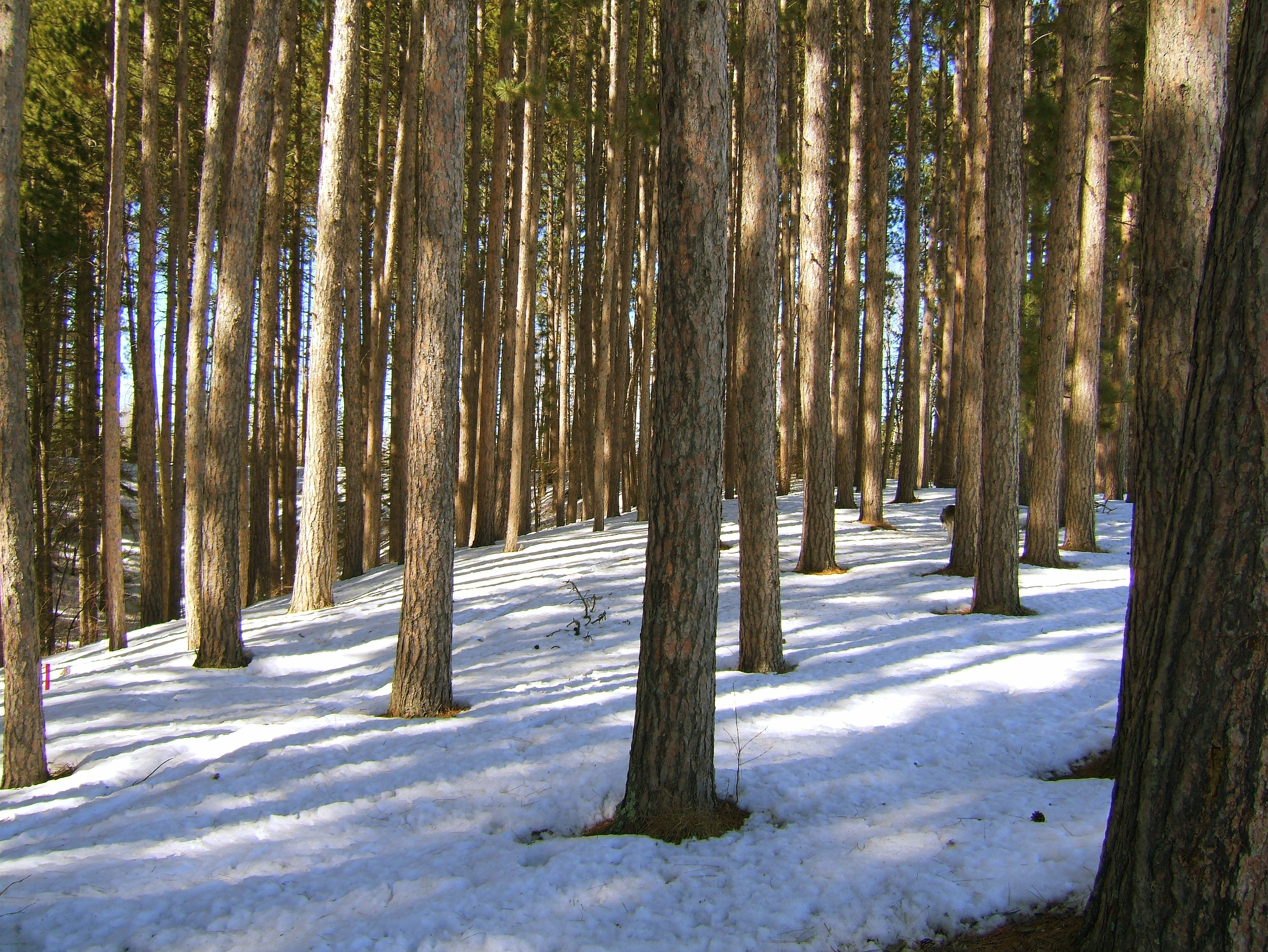
Red pine forest

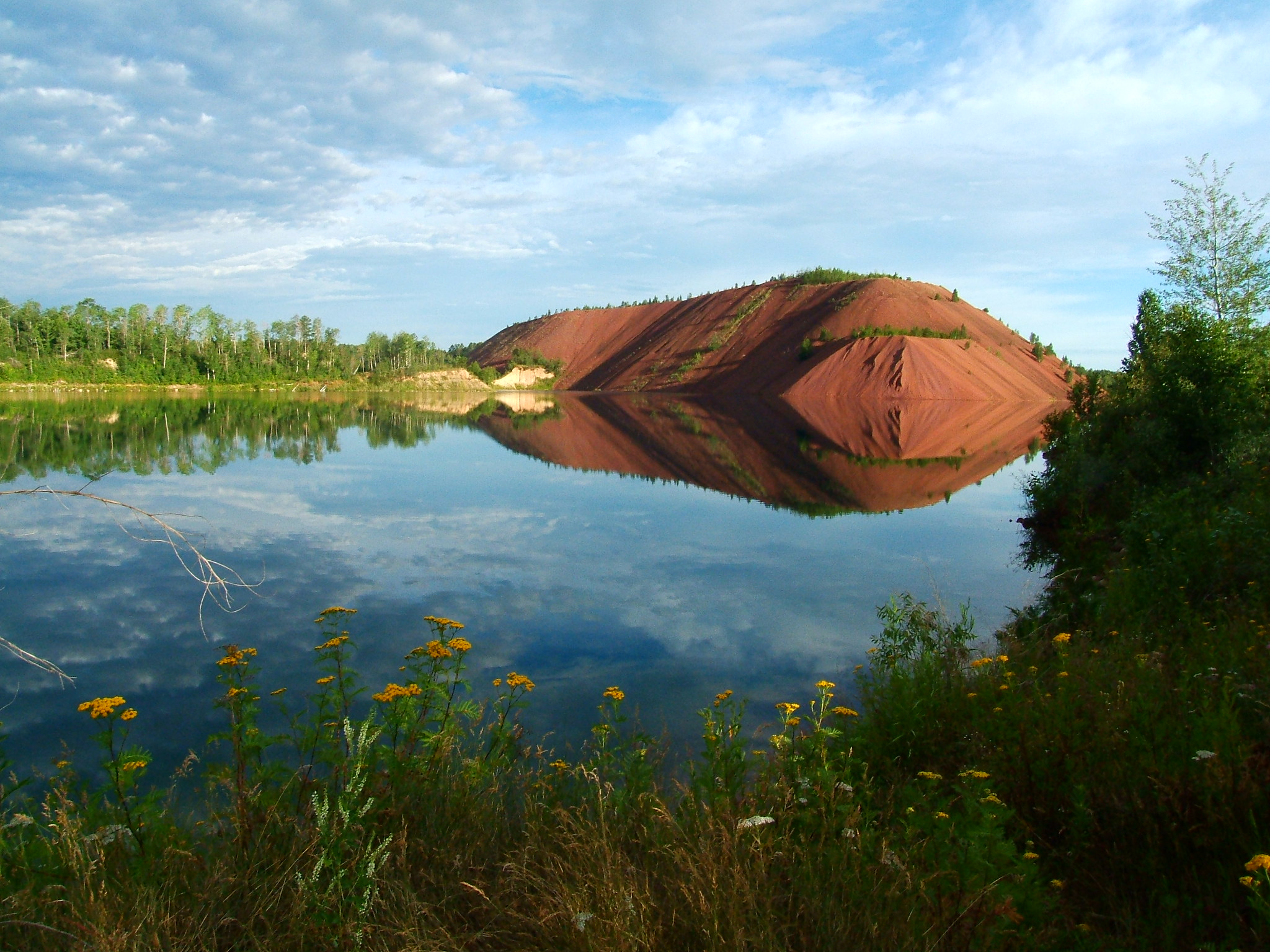
Iron Range near the Mesabi Trail

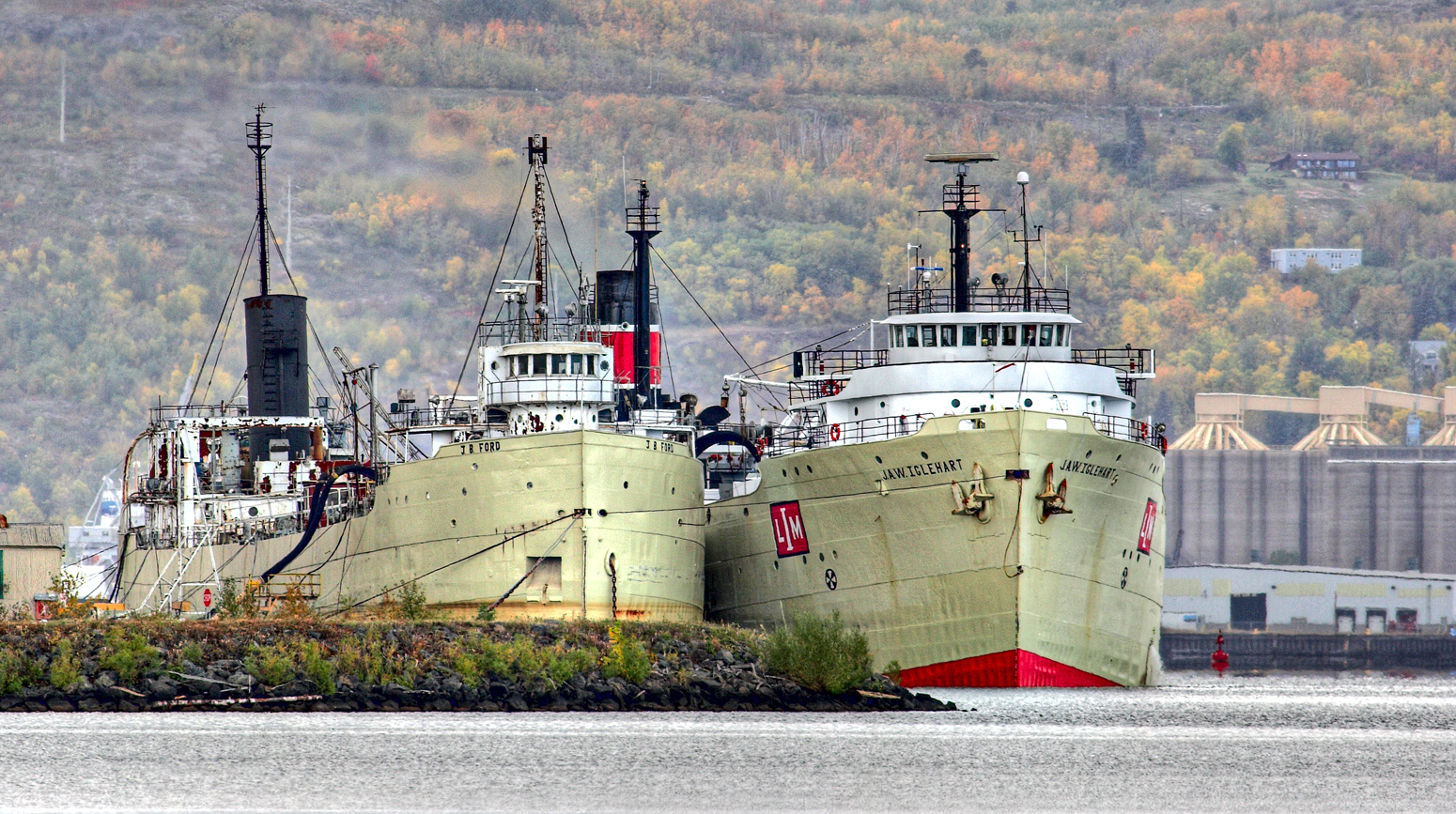
Cement carrier and storage vessel, Lake Superior, Duluth

Manufacturing was not left out. The brass era automobile maker Dan Patch was founded in Minneapolis in 1911.

Retail is represented by Target Corporation, Best Buy, and Supervalu, all headquartered in the Twin Cities. Southdale Center, the first fully enclosed and completely climate-controlled shopping mall in the United States opened on October 8, 1956, in the suburban city of Edina. The largest shopping mall in the United States, the Mall of America, is located in Bloomington.

St. Jude Medical represents a growing biomedical industry spawned by university research, and Rochester is the headquarters of the world-famous Mayo Clinic. UnitedHealth Group is the second largest health insurance company in the U.S.

Financial institutions include U.S. Bancorp, Ameriprise and Thrivent Financial for Lutherans.

As might be expected in state with a love of the outdoors, boats and other recreational products are manufactured by a number of Minnesota companies, including Polaris Industries and Arctic Cat, who make snowmobiles and ATVs, Alumacraft Boat Company, and Lund Boats.

Today, the most salient characteristic of the economy is its diversity; the relative outputs of its business sectors closely match the United States as a whole.

=== Mining ===
Mining plays a significant role in Minnesota’s economy, particularly in the northeastern region known as the Iron Range. The state is the largest producer of iron ore in the United States, primarily through the mining and processing of taconite, a low-grade iron ore that requires pelletizing before shipment. Mining operations are concentrated on the Mesabi Range, with additional activity on the Vermilion and Cuyuna Range.

Companies currently operating large-scale taconite facilities include Cleveland-Cliffs, which owns and operates the United Taconite and Northshore Mining plants, and United States Steel, which operates the Minntac and Keetac facilities. ArcelorMittal manages the Minorca Mine near Virginia.

Most mined ore is shipped by rail to ports in Duluth, Two Harbors, and Superior, Wisconsin, where it is loaded onto bulk freighters for transport to steel mills in the Great Lakes region. Employment in the mining sector has declined over time due to mechanization and consolidation, but the industry remains one of the largest sources of high-wage jobs in northeastern Minnesota.

=== Forestry ===
Forestry remains an active component of Minnesota's resource economy, especially in the northern part of the state. The forest products industry includes logging, pulpwood processing, engineered wood production, and paper manufacturing. According to the Minnesota Department of Natural Resources, approximately 17 million acres of forest land cover the state, with a mix of public, tribal, and private ownership.

Minnesota’s timber industry supports both primary manufacturing (such as sawmills and veneer production) and secondary manufacturing (including cabinetry, furniture, and packaging). Sustainable forestry practices, including selective harvesting and replanting, are regulated at both the state and federal level.

=== Mesabi Metallics ===
Mesabi Metallics, a proposed mining and pelletizing facility near Nashwauk, represents the largest private business investment in Minnesota in recent decades. Currently, Mesabi Metallics reports 1.8 billion dollars in private development to the Minnesota Department of Employment and Economic Development. The project, located on a former Essar Steel site, has been the subject of prolonged legal and financial disputes, but resumed construction in 2024 under new management. It reported being on track to begin commercial operation in the first quarter of 2026.

The facility is designed to produce high-grade taconite pellets for the domestic steel industry, with potential plans for direct-reduced iron (DRI) capabilities. When completed, the project is expected to support hundreds of construction jobs and more than 300 permanent positions. The site spans over 3,200 acres and includes both a mine and a processing plant.

State and local officials have emphasized the economic importance of the project for St. Louis County, Itasca County, and the broader Mesabi Iron Range.

=== The digital state ===
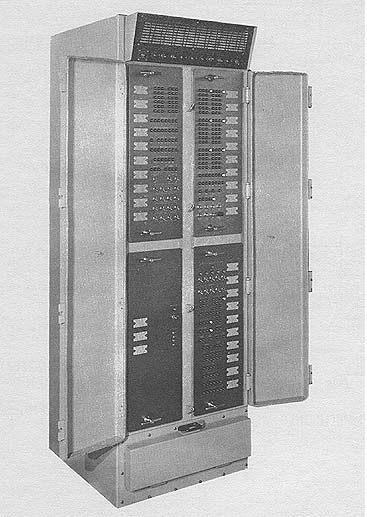
The UNIVAC 1218, a computer built for military applications, was designed in the early 1960s.

Minnesota attracted entrepreneurs and engineers, especially in the computer industry, and became a leading center of computer manufacturing after the war. Engineering Research Associates was formed in 1946 to develop computers for the Navy and the intelligence agencies. It merged with Remington Rand, and soon became a division of Sperry Rand. William Norris, Seymour Cray, and others left Sperry in 1957 to form Control Data Corporation (CDC). Cray Research was formed when Cray left CDC to form his own company. "Minnesota was the undisputed epicenter of top-secret digital computing for decades." Medical device maker Medtronic also was founded in the Twin Cities in 1949. Honeywell was a national force in computing until selling its computer division to Groupe Bull in 1989, remaining a prominent military and aerospace concern headquartered in Minnesota until 1999 when, after a merger, it moved to New Jersey. National firms, such as International Business Machines, moved manufacturing and R&D operations to Minnesota. State government and powerful politicians such as Hubert Humphrey maintained a favorable climate. The Minnesota Educational Computing Consortium brought state-wide networked computing in the 1970s and developed educational software such as the popular Oregon Trail game. The Federal Reserve Bank of Minneapolis combined computing power with financial clout across its region from Montana to upper Michigan. The University of Minnesota trained many computer specialists who decided to stay in the Minnesota rather than move to California. Minnesota thus preceded the better-known industrial districts of Route 128 around Boston and Silicon Valley. An active high-technology sector is represented today by Alliant Techsystems, Ceridian, Cray, Digi International, Digital River, Geek Squad, Hutchinson Technology, Imation, IBM Rochester, Lawson Software, MacSoft, Medtronic, MTS Systems, St. Jude Medical, Stratasys, SPS Commerce, 3M, and more than 400 smaller software companies.

== Minnesota's largest companies ==
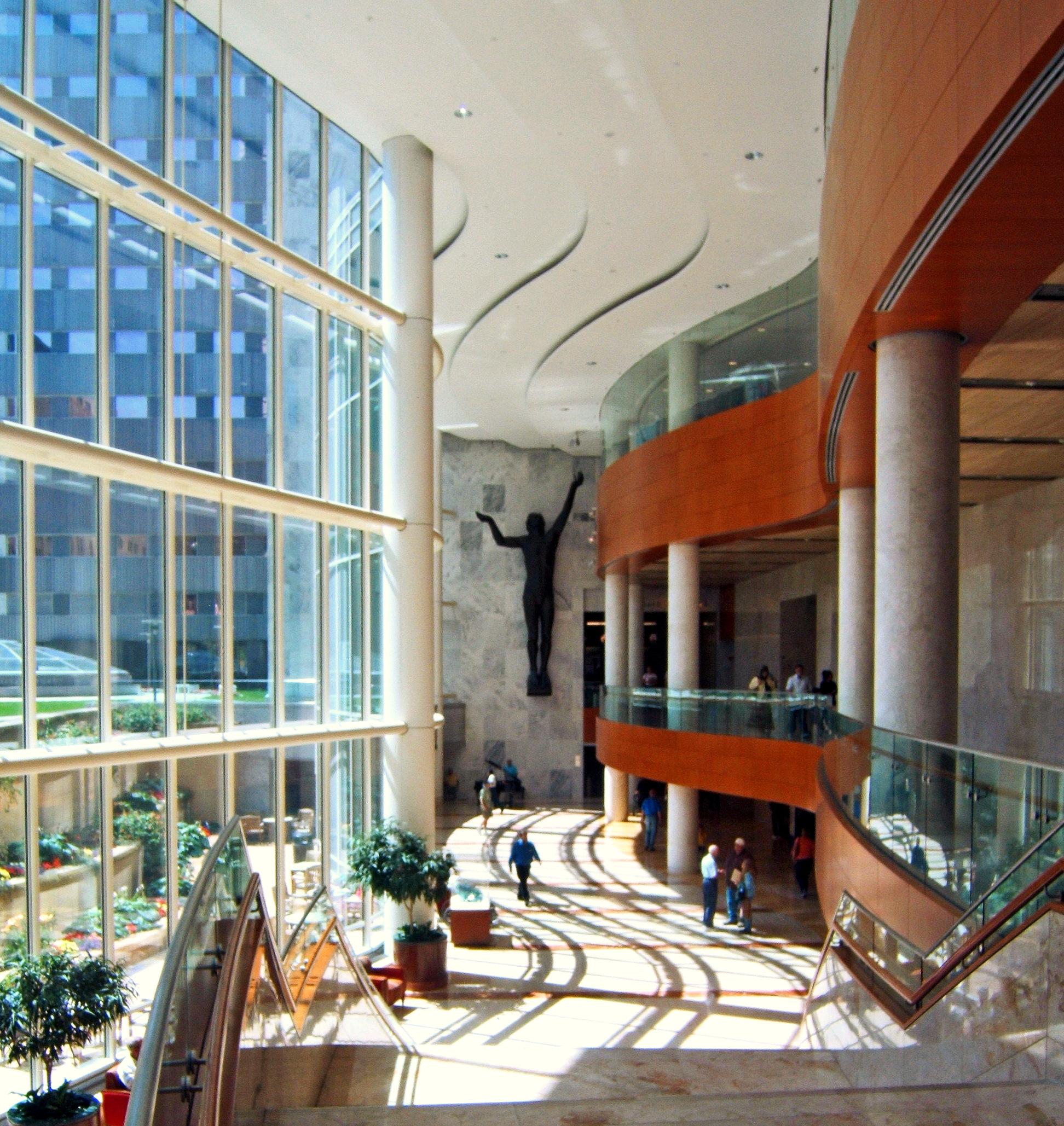
A Mayo Clinic atrium in Rochester

=== Nonprofits ===
The following table lists the Minnesota-based non-profit organizations among the largest 400 in the U.S. by 2006 private donations.

| State rank by revenue | Name | National rank | Donations ($ millions) 2006 estimate | Headquarters city |
|---|---|---|---|---|
| 1 | Mayo Clinic | 45 | 265.9 | Rochester |
| 2 | University of Minnesota | 46 | 265.4 | Minneapolis |
| 3 | Scholarship America | 114 | 136.2 | St. Peter |
| 4 | Minnesota Public Radio | 378 | 40.3 | St. Paul |
| 5 | Hope for the City | 379 | 40.3 | Edina |

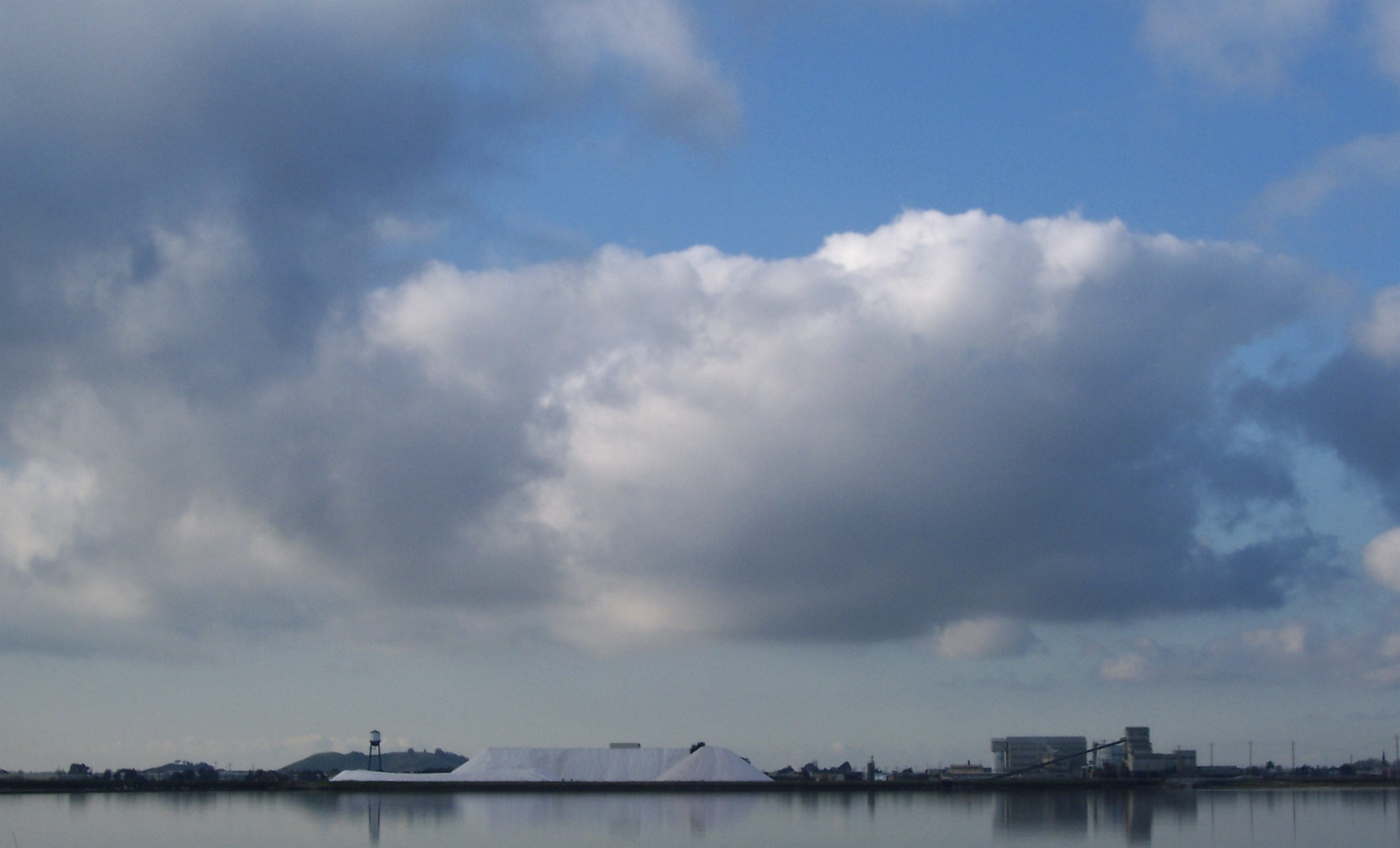
Cargill salt harvesting, Newark, California

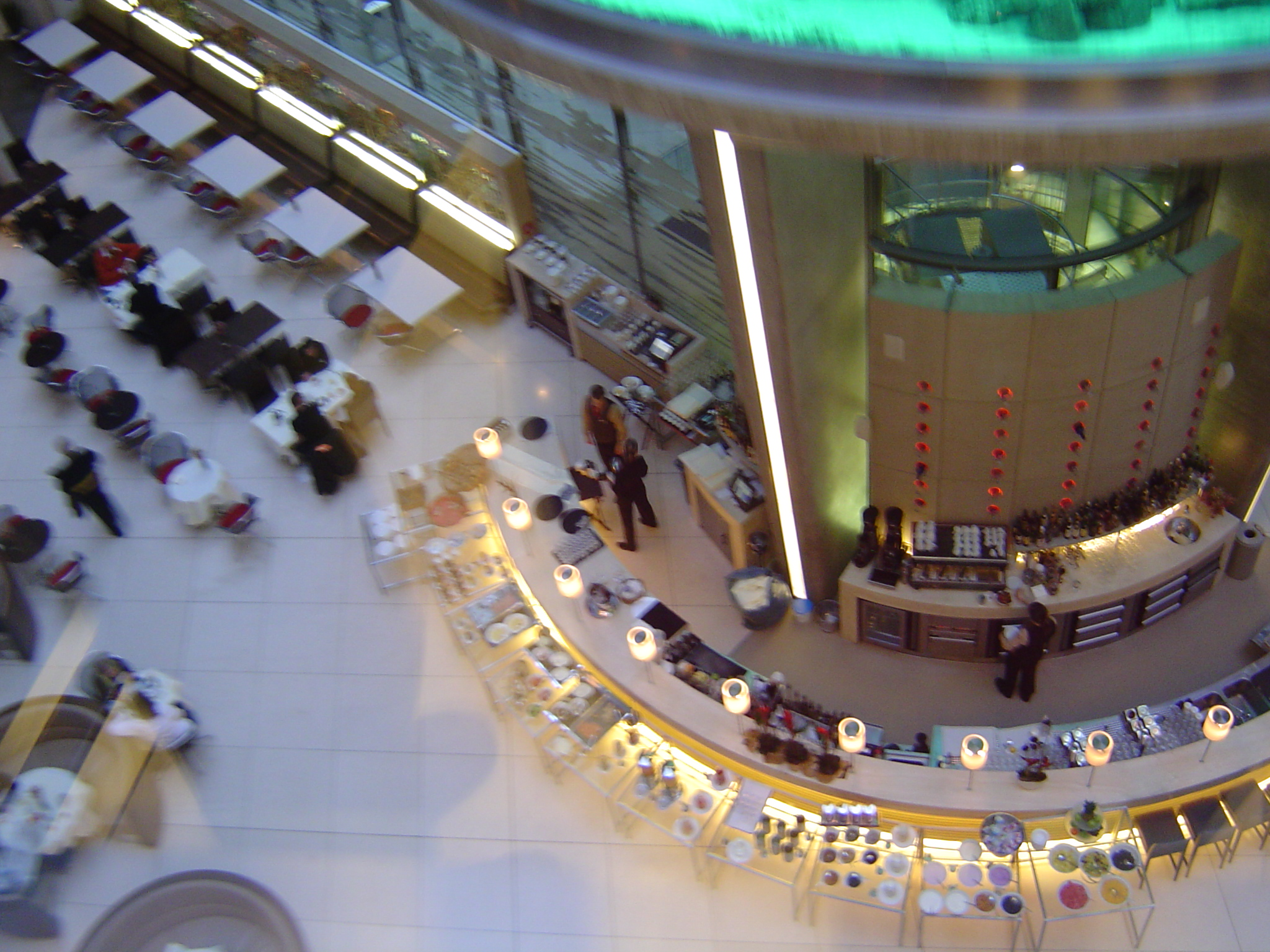
Part of Carlson, a Radisson hotel in Berlin

=== Private companies ===
The following table lists the privately held companies headquartered in Minnesota with 2007 revenues over $1 billion.

| State rank by revenue | Name | National rank | Revenue ($ billions) 2007 estimate | Employees | Headquarters city | Known for |
|---|---|---|---|---|---|---|
| 1 | Cargill | 1 | 107.90 | 131,000 | Minnetonka | Farm products |
| 2 | Carlson | 87 | 38.00 | 170,000 | Minnetonka | Travel and lodging |
| 3 | Schwan Food Company | 124 | 3.30 | 17,000 | Marshall | Dairy products and frozen foods |
| 4 | Andersen Corporation | 136 | 3.00 | 10,600 | Bayport | Windows and building materials |
| 5 | Rosen's Diversified | 184 | 2.40 | 4,200 | Fairmont | Meat products |
| 6 | M A Mortenson | 218 | 2.14 | 2,700 | Robbinsdale | Heavy construction |
| 7 | Fagen | 227 | 2.08 | 3,600 | Granite Falls | Heavy construction |
| 8 | Holiday Cos. | 238 | 2.00 | 4,600 | Bloomington | Retailing |
| 9 | Taylor Corp. | 286 | 1.70 | 12,500 | North Mankato | Publishing – periodicals |
| 10 | Ceridian | 295 | 1.65 | 9,500 | Bloomington | Information technology services |
| 11 | Buffets, Inc. | 334 | 1.46 | 38,000 | Eagan | Restaurants |
| 12 | API Group | 351 | 1.35 | 6,000 | New Brighton | Conglomerates |
| 13 | Lifetouch | 424 | 1.05 | 20,000 | Eden Prairie | Photography |
| 14 | Ryan Companies | 427 | 1.04 | 600 | Minneapolis | Heavy construction |

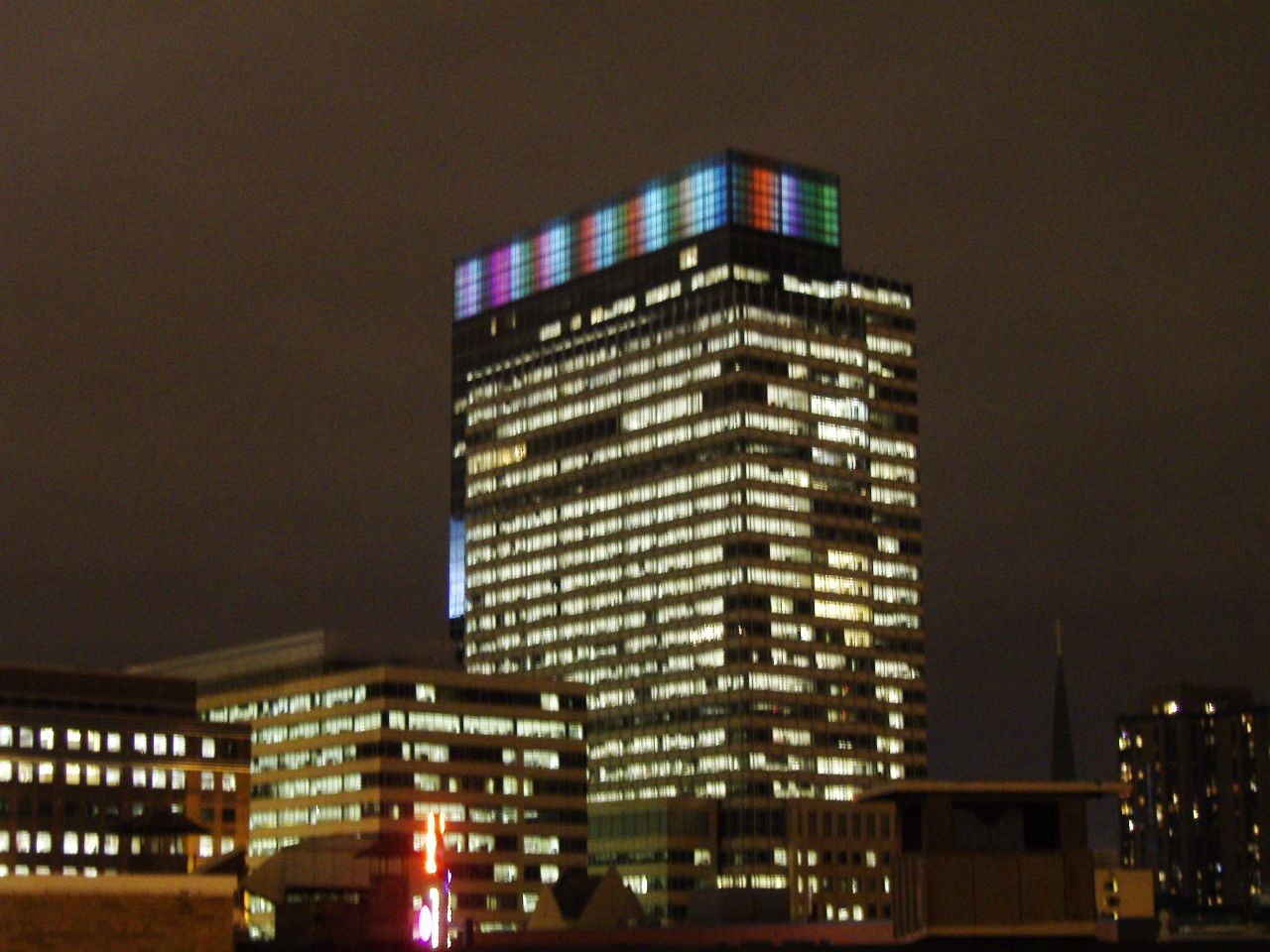
Target Corporation, Minneapolis

=== Public companies ===
The following table lists the public companies headquartered in Minnesota with 2010 revenues placing them in the 1000 largest U.S. companies.

| State rank by revenue | Company name | National rank | Revenue ($millions) 2010 estimate | Headquarters city | Known for |
|---|---|---|---|---|---|
| 1 | UnitedHealth Group | 6 | 184,840 | Minnetonka | Managed health care |
| 2 | Target | 33 | 67,390 | Minneapolis | Retailing |
| 3 | Best Buy | 47 | 49,694 | Richfield | Retailing |
| 4 | Supervalu | 61 | 40,597 | Eden Prairie | Food distribution and retailing |
| 5 | 3M | 97 | 26,692 | Maplewood | Diversified manufacturing |
| 6 | CHS, Inc. | 103 | 25,268 | Inver Grove Heights | Fuel distribution |
| 7 | US Bancorp | 126 | 20,518 | Headquarters in Minneapolis, domiciled in Delaware | Banking and finance |
| 8 | General Mills | 166 | 14,796 | Golden Valley | Food processing |
| 9 | Land O' Lakes | 218 | 11,146 | Arden Hills | Dairy products |
| 10 | Xcel Energy | 237 | 10,311 | Minneapolis | Electricity production and distribution |
| 11 | Ameriprise | 246 | 10,046 | Minneapolis | Financial planning |
| 12 | C.H. Robinson Worldwide | 265 | 9,274 | Eden Prairie | Logistic services |
| 13 | Thrivent Financial for Lutherans | 318 | 7,471 | Minneapolis | Financial products |
| 14 | Hormel Foods | 325 | 7,221 | Austin | Meat processing |
| 15 | Mosaic | 346 | 6,759 | Plymouth | Fertilizer manufacturing |
| 16 | Ecolab | 378 | 6,090 | St. Paul | Sanitation supplier |
| 17 | St. Jude Medical | 436 | 5,165 | Little Canada | Medical devices |
| 18 | Nash Finch | 449 | 4,992 | Edina | Food distribution |
| 19 | Alliant Techsystems | 472 | 4,808 | Eden Prairie | Defense contractor |
| 20 | Valspar | 618 | 3,482 | Minneapolis | Paint and coatings |
| 21 | Pentair | 627 | 3,395 | Golden Valley | Water treatment |
| 22 | Patterson | 687 | 2,999 | Eagan | Dental and veterinarian supplies |
| 23 | Securian/Minnesota Life | 729 | 2,746 | St. Paul | Life insurance |
| 24 | Regis | 730 | 2,739 | Edina | Hair salons |
| 25 | Fastenal | 813 | 2,340 | Winona | Fastener manufacturer |
| 26 | Donaldson | 836 | 2,233 | Bloomington | Filtration products |
| 27 | Imation | 860 | 2,155 | Oakdale | Data storage products |
| 28 | Polaris Industries | 911 | 1,948 | Medina | Snowmobiles and ATVs |
| 29 | Toro | 936 | 1,878 | Bloomington | Lawn and irrigation equipment |
| 30 | Michael Foods | 961 | 1,804 | Minnetonka | Packaged foods |

=== By employment in Minnesota ===
As of 2025, Minnesota's largest employers were:

| Company | Employees in Minnesota | Headquartered in Minnesota? |
|---|---|---|
| Mayo Clinic | 56,999 | Yes |
| State of Minnesota | 44,889 | Yes |
| Target Corporation | 35,000 | Yes |
| M Health Fairview | 34,673 | Yes |
| HealthPartners | 26,300 | Yes |
| Walmart | 24,677 | No |
| University of Minnesota | 23,481 | Yes |
| Allina Health | 21,387 | Yes |
| UnitedHealth Group | 19,000 | Yes |
| Federal government | 18,031 | No |
| Minnesota State Colleges and Universities system | 14,539 | Yes |
| Essentia Health | 12,606 | Yes |
| CentraCare Health | 11,337 | Yes |
| Wells Fargo | 11,000 | No |
| U.S. Bancorp | 11,000 | No |

== Energy use and production ==
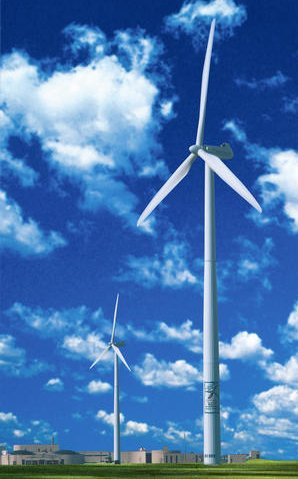
Wind turbines in western Minnesota

The state does not produce any petroleum of its own, but boasts the largest oil refinery of any non-oil-producing state, the Pine Bend Refinery. As of 2001, Minnesotans were using a total of 7.2 million US gallons (27,000 m^{3}) of gasoline per day, and fuel use rises in the region by about 2% annually. About 70% of the gasoline fuel used in the state comes from Pine Bend and the nearby St. Paul Park Refinery, while most of the rest comes from a combination of the Mandan Refinery in North Dakota, and the Superior Refinery in Superior, Wisconsin. 40 to 50% of Pine Bend's output is used within the state. Flint Hills is currently planning a $100 million expansion to increase capacity at the plant to about 330,000 barrels per day (52,000 m^{3}/d). Petroleum from the north comes to the state through one of the longest pipelines in the world, the Lakehead Pipeline and the Minnesota Pipeline. Additional crude comes from the south via the Wood River Pipeline.

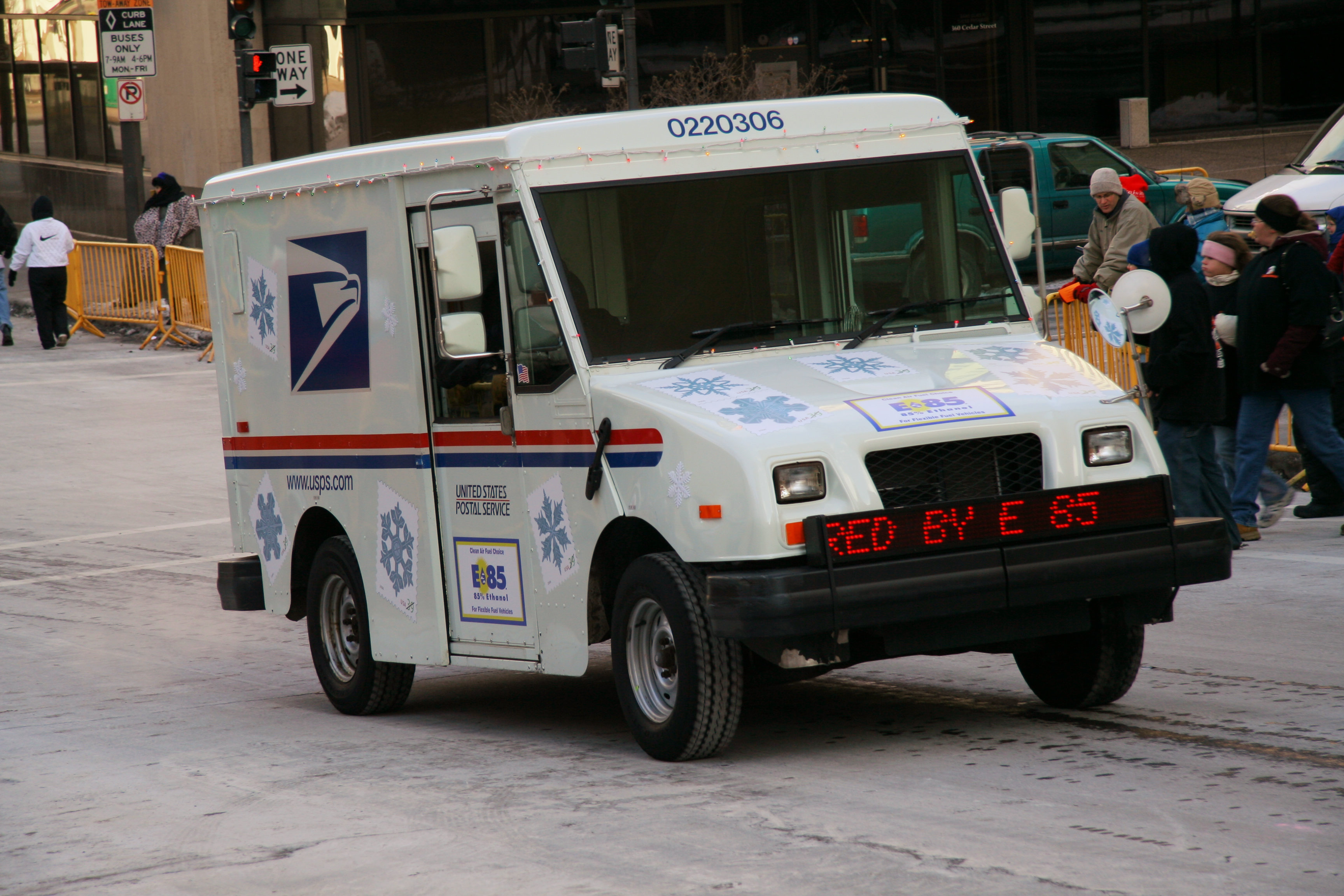
United States Postal Service vehicle advertising its use of E85, Saint Paul. More fuel stations in Minnesota offer E85 than in any other state.

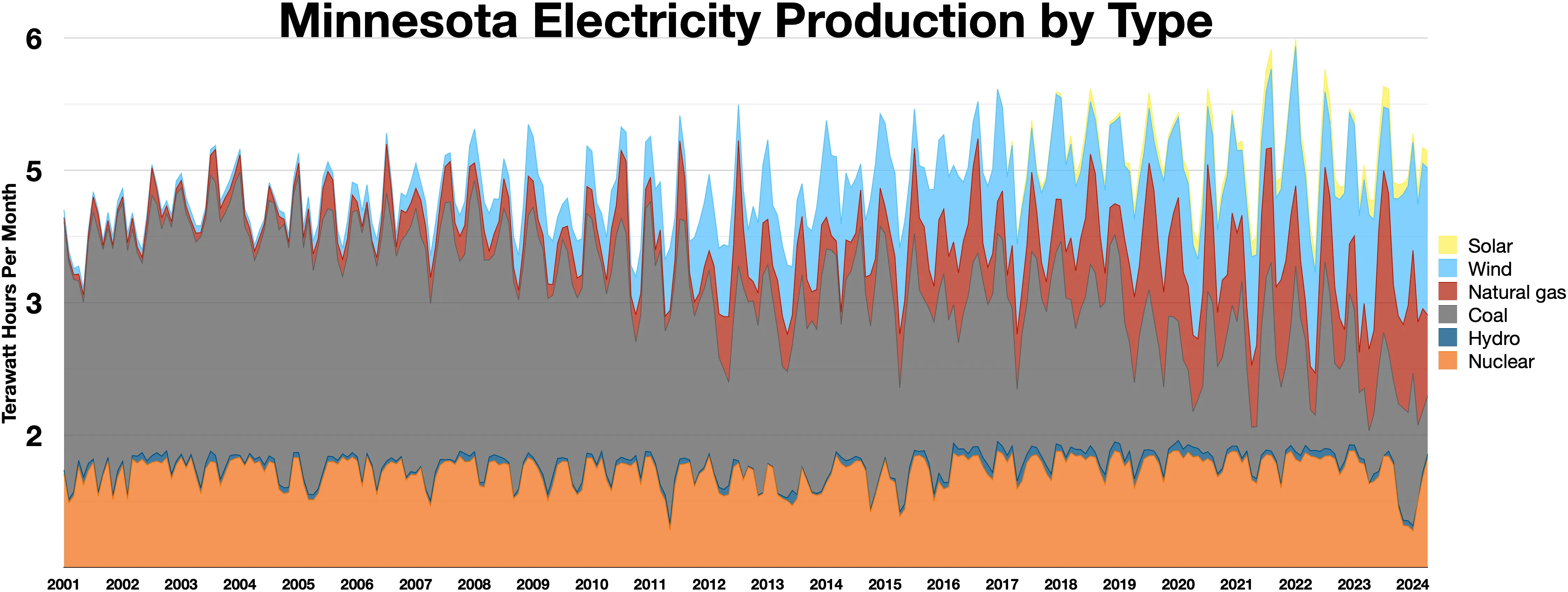
Minnesota electricity production by type

Ethanol fuel is produced in the state, and consumer gasoline is required to contain 10% ethanol (E10). As of 2006, Minnesota is the only U.S. state with such a mandate. 20% ethanol (E20) will be mandated in 2013. Minnesota has the highest number of fuel stations offering E85 fuel, with 300 statewide. A 2% biodiesel blend has also been required in diesel fuel since 2005. Electricity-producing wind turbines have become popular, particularly in the windy southwest region on the Buffalo Ridge. As of November 2006, the state is the country's fourth-largest producer of wind power, with 812 megawatts installed and another 82 megawatts planned.

Like other Midwestern states that experience cold winters, Minnesota is heavily dependent on natural gas for home heating. Just over two-thirds of homes use the fuel.

== State taxes ==
Minnesota's income tax is progressive with four rates, 5.35%, 7.05%, 7.85%, and 9.85%. The sales tax in Minnesota for most items is 6.875% effective July 1, 2009. The state does not charge sales tax on clothing, some services, or food items for home consumption. The state legislature may allow municipalities to institute local sales taxes and special local taxes, such as the 0.5% supplemental sales tax in Minneapolis. The cities of St. Paul, Rochester, Duluth and St. Cloud have similar taxes. Excise taxes are levied on alcohol, tobacco, and motor fuel. The state imposes a use tax on items purchased elsewhere but used within Minnesota. Owners of real property in Minnesota pay property tax to their county, municipality, school district, and special taxing districts. The overall state and local tax burden is calculated to average 11.9% in 2006, ranking 4th highest in the country.

== See also ==
- Minnesota Labor Relations Act (1939)
