= Enbridge Pipeline System =

Canada–US oil pipeline

Enbridge System Canadian Mainline

Location
- Country: Canada
- Direction: north–south–east
- Start: Edmonton, Alberta
- Passes through: Gretna, Manitoba; Sarnia, Ontario
- To: Montreal, Quebec

General information
- Type: crude oil, dilbit
- Owner: Enbridge Inc.

Technical information
- Length: 2,306 km (1,433 mi)

Lakehead System U.S. Mainline

Location
- Country: United States
- Direction: north–south–east
- Start: Neche, North Dakota
- To: Chicago, Illinois

General information
- Type: crude oil
- Owner: Enbridge Energy Partners, L.P.

Technical information
- Length: 3,057 km (1,900 mi)

The Enbridge Pipeline System is an oil pipeline system which transports crude oil and dilbit from Canada to the United States. The system exceeds 5,000 kilometres (3,100 mi) in length including multiple paths. More than 3,000 kilometres (1,900 mi) of the system is in the United States while the rest is in Canada and serves the Athabasca oil sands production facilities. Main parts of the system are 2,306-kilometre-long (1,433 mi) Canadian Mainline and 3,057-kilometre-long (1,900 mi) Lakehead System (U.S. Mainline). On average, it delivers 1.4 million barrels per day (220×10^{3} m^{3}/d) of crude oil and other products to the major oil refineries in the American Midwest and the Canadian province of Ontario. The Canadian portion is owned by Enbridge, while the U.S. portion is partly owned by that company through Enbridge Energy Partners, LP, formerly known as Lakehead Pipe Line Partners and Lakehead Pipe Line Company.

== Background ==
The first portion of the pipeline was built over the course of 150 days in 1950 by a 1,500-man labour force. It crossed approximately 1,600 kilometres (990 mi) from Redwater, Alberta, through Saskatchewan, Manitoba, North Dakota, and Minnesota, to the Great Lakes seaport of Superior, Wisconsin. At the same time, four oil tankers were constructed to carry the crude from Superior to oil refineries in Sarnia, Ontario. Oil first entered the pipe on August 25, 1950, and the first tanker, Imperial Leduc, was launched on November 4. Other tankers that followed were, Imperial Redwater, Imperial Woodbend, and B.A. Peerless.

Because the lakes froze in the winter, preventing tanker traffic, the decision was soon made to expand the pipeline all the way to Sarnia. In May 1953, contracts were awarded and construction began. At 2,840 kilometres (1,760 mi), it became the world's longest pipeline. A major upgrade was undertaken in the 1990s to replace old pipe and expand the system.

== Mainline system ==
Today, there are two routes that oil can take between Superior and Sarnia. A northern route passes through the upper and lower peninsulas of Michigan before crossing into Ontario, while the southern route circles south of Lake Michigan through Illinois and Indiana before reaching Michigan. There are 59 pumping stations in the pipeline system, and the actual pipes range in diameter from 12 to 48 inches (300 to 1,220 mm).

One major junction point is in Clearbrook, Minnesota where the pipeline connects to the Minnesota Pipeline, which carries crude to the Pine Bend Refinery in Rosemount, Minnesota. The North Dakota Pipeline Company system of pipeline also has a connection in Clearbrook, linking the Mandan Refinery in Mandan, North Dakota. The Murphy Oil refinery in Superior, Wisconsin, is directly linked to the pipeline.

Another point in Lockport, Illinois connects two pipelines to Patoka, Illinois, plus a longer link to Cushing, Oklahoma. A relatively short 56-kilometre (35 mi) link from Stockbridge, Michigan connects to two refineries in the Toledo, Ohio area.

The Mainline system, conventionally divided into the US and Canadian mainlines, consists of 1900 miles of pipeline that run from central Alberta to southern Ontario via the northern US. The system can carry up to 2.5 million barrels of oil per day. Lines 1 through 4 connect Edmonton to Superior, Wisconsin. From there, Line 5 runs through the Upper Peninsula of Michigan and across the straits of Mackinac to cross back into Canada at the St. Clair River. Line 6 runs south through Wisconsin and Illinois to the terminal in Griffith, Indiana, which serves BP Whiting and other Chicago-area clients, and then continues on through northwest Indiana and southern Michigan to rejoin Line 5 at Sarnia, Ontario.

The Mainline system comprises Lines 1, 2, 3, 4, 5, 6, 7, 10, 11, 14, 61, 62, 64, and 67. Pipelines that connect to the system, but are not part of it, include Line 9 (Montreal to Sarnia), Line 17 (Stockbridge to Toledo), and Line 55 (Flanagan to Cushing).

Pipeline		Start	End	Length (miles)	Capacity (m^{3}/day)	Size (inches)	Materials carried	Year created	Remarks
Line 1		Edmonton	Superior, Wisconsin	1,098	37,600	18	Natural gas liquids, refined products, light synthetics	1950	
Line 2	Line 2A	Edmonton	Cromer	596	70,300	24	condensate, light synthetic, sweet crude, light & high sour crude	1957	
Line 2	Line 2B	Cromer	Superior, Wisconsin	502	70,300	24/26	condensate, light synthetic, sweet crude, light & high sour crude	1957	
Line 3		Edmonton	Superior, Wisconsin	1,097	120,830	34	light crudeoil, heavy & sour dilbit	1967	
Line 4		Edmonton	Superior, Wisconsin	1,098	126,500	36/48	heavy, medium (from Clearbrook only), light sour (from Clearbrook only)	2002	
Line 5		Superior	Sarnia	1,098	126,500	30	heavy, medium (from Clearbrook only), light sour crude (from Clearbrook only)	1953	Line splits into two when passing under Straits of Mackinac. Volumes not delivered to Sarnia-area refineries are pumped into tanks for reinjection into Line 7.
Line 6	Line 6A	Superior	Griffith	467	106,000	34	light synthetic (to Lockport only), sweet crude (to Lockport only), light & high sour, medium, heavy	1969	delivery points at Lockport, Mokena and Griffith; deliveries for BP Whiting are pumped into delivery tankage for subsequent transfer to Whiting
Line 6	Line 6B	Griffith (Chicago)	Sarnia	293	45,000	30	light synthetic (to Lockport only), sweet crude (to Lockport only), light & high sour, medium, heavy	1969	delivery points at Lockport, Mokena and Griffith; deliveries for BP Whiting are pumped into delivery tankage for subsequent transfer to Whiting
Line 7		Sarnia	Westover	120	23,900	20	light synthetic, sweet, light & high sour, medium, heavy	1957	
Line 9		Sarnia	Montreal	397	35,770	30	light synthetic, sweet, light & high sour, medium, heavy	1976	Reversal (originally proposed in 2012) was completed in two stages including an expansion of capacity from 240,000 BPD to 300,000 BPD in 2015
Line 10		Westover	Kiantone NY (United Refining)	91	11,800	12/20	light synthetic, sweet, light & high sour, medium, heavy	1962	
Line 11		Westover	Nanticoke (Imperial Oil)	47	18,600	16/20	condensate, light synthetic, sweet, light & high sour, medium, heavy	1971	
Line 13 (Southern Lights pipeline)		Manhattan (Illinois)	Edmonton	1,588	18,618	20	diluent	2010	
Line 14		Superior	Mokena	467	50,500	24	light synthetic, sweet, light & high sour, medium		
Line 64		Superior	Griffith (Chicago)	467	50,500	24	light synthetic, sweet, light & high sour, medium		
Line 61		Superior	Flanagan (near Chicago)	454	63,600	42			reinjection to Line 55 to Cushing or Line 62 to Griffith. As of January 2015 permits pending for expansion to volume of 1.2 million barrels per day.
Line 62		Flanagan	Griffith (Chicago)	75	20,700	22	heavy crude		
Line 65		Cromer	Clearbrook, with connection to Minnesota Pipeline and option to send to breakout tankage for reinjection into Line 3, 4, or 2B	313	29,500	20	light sour, medium	2010	
Line 67 (Alberta Clipper pipeline)		Hardisty	Superior, with connection to Minnesota Pipeline at Clearbrook	999	71,500	36	heavy crude	2009	

== Expansion ==
As of 2013 there were expansion plans for the pipeline system which would, if permitted and fully built, provide the capacity to transport an amount of dilbit from the Athabasca oil sands into the United States and the Gulf Coast equal to that of the Keystone Pipeline.

== Accidents and incidents ==
=== Largest inland oil spill In U.S. history ===
In 1991, Enbridge's Line 3 pipeline spilled 1.7 million gallons of oil in Grand Rapids, Minnesota and the Prairie River, a tributary of the Mississippi River. It was the largest inland spill of oil in U.S. history. Deliberations over construction of a new Line 3 pipeline have drawn resistance from climate justice organizers and Native communities in Minnesota.

=== Cohasset, MN oil spill ===
On July 4, 2002, 252,000 gallons of crude oil spilled into a marsh near Cohasset, Minnesota due to a rupture of Line 4 running from Edmonton, Alberta, Canada, and Superior, Wisconsin. Emergency responders enacted a controlled burn at 4:45pm the next day to prevent the oil from penetrating into any waterways. The cost of remediating the accident was reported around $5.6 million.

=== Clearbrook Junction, MN fire ===
On November 28, 2007, a large fire erupted during pipeline repair work at the Clearbrook Junction. This fire, described by a spokesperson for the Minnesota Department of Public Safety as a "big fire, not an explosion", killed two workers and caused a $4 per barrel spike in oil prices the following day. The 34-inch (860 mm) pipeline carries crude from Saskatchewan to the Chicago area.

=== Kalamazoo River oil spill ===
On July 26, 2010, 840,000 gallons of dilbit crude oil leaked from the pipeline in Calhoun County, Michigan, spilling into Talmadge Creek that flows into the Kalamazoo River. Despite alarms at Edmonton headquarters it took eighteen hours and a report from a Michigan utilities employee before the pipeline company acted to halt the flow finally. Enbridge reached a settlement with the U.S. Department of Justice and Environmental Protection Agency for a total of $177 million in response to the spill, along with an additional spill in Romeoville, Illinois later that year. This settlement included $110 million in spill prevention, $62 million in Clean Water Act violations, and $5.4 million in cleanup costs. In addition, the company was fined $3.7 million by the United States Department of Transportation due to 24 violations in pipeline safety regulation. Under its agreement with the federal government, Enbridge was required to hold community open houses along pipeline routes. By 2014, the cost of cleanup to the company totaled to $1.21 billion.

=== Mackinac Straits Tugboat anchor incident ===
In 2018, a tugboat dropped its anchor on the pipeline near the Straits of Mackinac in Michigan, denting the pipe and causing 600 U.S. gallons (2,300 liters) of mineral oil to leak from two electric cables.

=== Fort Atkinson, WI diluent leak ===
On April 26, 2019, a faulty elbow joint caused a leak in Enbridge's Line 13. Between 29 and 33 barrels of diluent were released into the soil near Blackhawk Island, Wisconsin, outside Fort Atkinson. Enbridge did not report the spill to the Wisconsin Department of Natural Resources until July 31, 2020, over a year later.

=== Cambridge, WI oil spill ===
On November 11, 2024, Approximately 70,000 gallons of crude oil were discovered to have spilled from a pipeline near Cambridge, WI. It was detected during a routine check of the Cambridge station when "an Enbridge Technician noticed what appeared to be product staining an area of gravel" near a discharge valve, according to a report on the incident by the Federal Hazardous Materials Safety Administration. The spill is reported to have contaminated soil and groundwater, but effects are currently unknown, with a nearby creek seemingly unaffected.

== See also ==
- Enbridge Pipelines
- Enbridge Northern Gateway Pipelines
- List of oil pipelines
- List of oil refineries
- List of pipeline accidents in the United States
- North Dakota Pipeline Company system

== Bibliography ==
- Enbridge Pipelines Inc. (2011-07-01). "Competitive Toll Settlement" (PDF).
- Enbridge (2013). "Pipeline System Configuration: Quarter 1, 2013". Archived from the original on 2014-03-31.
