= DCTC =

DCTC may refer to:

- Dakota County Technical College, a technical college in Rosemount, Minnesota
- Denver Center Theatre Company
- Dow Corning Tennis Classic, ITF Women's Circuit tennis tournament
- Direct Connect Text Client, known as DCTC
- District of Columbia Transplant Community, known as DCTC
