= Minnesota Pipe Line =

Crude oil pipeline from Clearbrook, Minnesota southward to the Twin Cities

Coordinates: 47.6890°N 95.4103°W

Location
- Country: United States
- Start: Clearbrook, Minnesota
- To: Twin Cities

General information
- Type: Crude oil
- Owner: Minnesota Pipe Line Company, LLC
- Operator: Koch Pipeline Company
- Construction started: 2007
- Commissioned: 2008

Technical information
- Maximum discharge: 0.165 million barrels per day (~8.22×10^{6} t/a)

The Minnesota Pipe Line (or MPL) is a network of crude oil pipelines that run from Clearbrook, Minnesota southward to the Twin Cities. Original construction of Line 1 began in 1954 with subsequent lines added as capacity was needed. Construction of Line 4 began in 2007 after the State of Minnesota approved the building permit, and ended in 2008; it is owned by Minnesota Pipe Line Company, LLC (MPL) and is operated by Koch Pipeline Company, a wholly owned, indirect subsidiary of Koch Industries.

The original proposed route ran through an organic farm; the owners of the farm negotiated with MPL, as a result of which MPL agreed to route the pipeline around the farm and more generally "to implement what they believe was the first organic agriculture mitigation plan in the country applicable to pipeline infrastructure. This agreement was made part of the record of the MinnCan pipeline routing proceeding."

The pipeline is largely fed by the Enbridge Pipeline System that carries crude from Alberta, Canada. It splits into two parts at a junction in Cottage Grove, Minnesota. One branch serves the Pine Bend Refinery owned by Flint Hills Resources (another Koch subsidiary) in Rosemount. The other portion of the line runs to Marathon Petroleum's St. Paul Park Refinery in St. Paul Park, Minnesota. There is a connection at the Pine Bend Refinery to the Wood River Pipeline, which currently carries crude oil from the St. Louis, Missouri area to Minnesota.

In 2008 Minnesota Pipe Line completed a parallel 24-inch (610 mm) line to expand the pipeline capacity from Clearbrook to the Twin Cities by 165,000 barrels per day (26,200 m^{3}/d) with ultimate potential expansion to 350,000 barrels per day (56,000 m^{3}/d).

== Minnesota Pipe Line system ==
Pipeline	Start	End	Length (miles)	Capacity (bbl/day)	Size (inches)	Materials carried	Year created	Remarks
Line 1	Clearbrook	St. Paul Park	256		16		1954	
Line 2	Clearbrook	St. Paul Park					1970s	
Line 3		St. Paul Park					1980s	
Line 4: MinnCan Pipeline	Clearbrook	Rosemount	305	165000	24		2008	
