= Pine Bend Refinery =

Largest oil refinery in Minnesota

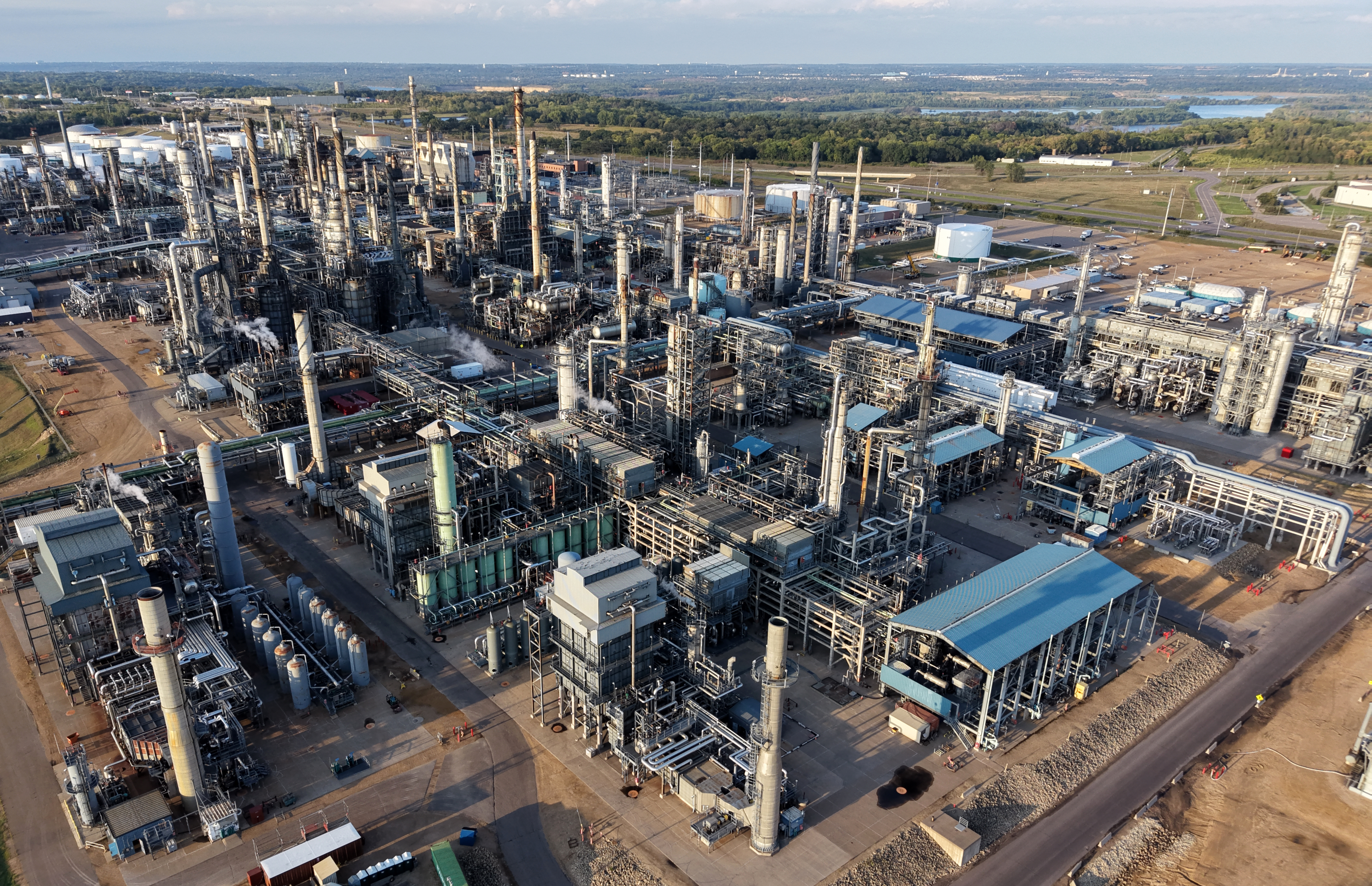
- Pine Bend Refinery in 2026
- Interactive map of Pine Bend Refinery
- Location: Minneapolis-St. Paul, Minnesota, United States; 44°46′0″N 93°2′30″W

Refinery details
- Owner: Flint Hills Resources
- Opened: 1955
- Capacity: 375,000 barrels per day (59,600 m^{3}/d)

The Pine Bend Refinery is the largest oil refinery in Minnesota, located in the Twin Cities suburbs of Rosemount and Inver Grove Heights next to southern split of U.S. Highway 52 and Minnesota State Highway 55. The refinery is notable for being the largest in the United States to be located in a state without any oil wells. Overall, it ranked 13th in the country as of 2024 by production, with a nameplate capacity of 375,000 barrels (59,600 m^{3}) per day. The facility is owned by Flint Hills Resources (FHR), a subsidiary of Koch Industries.

== History ==
The plant was first constructed in 1955 by the Great Northern Oil Company with a capacity of 25,000 barrels per day. Koch Industries purchased a controlling interest in the plant in 1969. Since then, capacity has grown more than tenfold.

As of 2001, Minnesotans were using a total of 7.2 million US gallons (27,000 m^{3}) of gasoline per day, and fuel use continues to climb in the region by about 2% annually. About 70% of the gasoline fuel used in the state comes from Pine Bend and the nearby St. Paul Park Refinery, while most of the rest comes from the Mandan Refinery in North Dakota, and the Superior Refinery in Superior, Wisconsin. Only 40 to 50% of Pine Bend's output is used within the state. The refinery supplies more than 50% of the state's gas and diesel requirements.

=== Facility renovation ===
In 2006 the plant underwent a "$350 million project to produce a diesel fuel containing substantially less sulfur."

In 2012 the company proposed to the Environmental Protection Agency (EPA) a $400 million upgrade to help move the refinery "closer to its processing capacity of 320,000 barrels of crude per day and also reduce emissions of nitrogen oxide and sulfur dioxide". It was estimated that the refinery was responsible for 2% of Minnesota's total greenhouse-gas emissions, about 3.5 million tons of carbon dioxide per year. During the expansion the daily contractor workforce increased by more than 1,000 workers. The plant underwent the upgrade in 2014, and included the replacement of the plant's three less-efficient heaters with two state-of-the-art model heaters, upgrades to an existing process heater, as well as improvements to the cooling towers.

=== Environmental and safety record ===
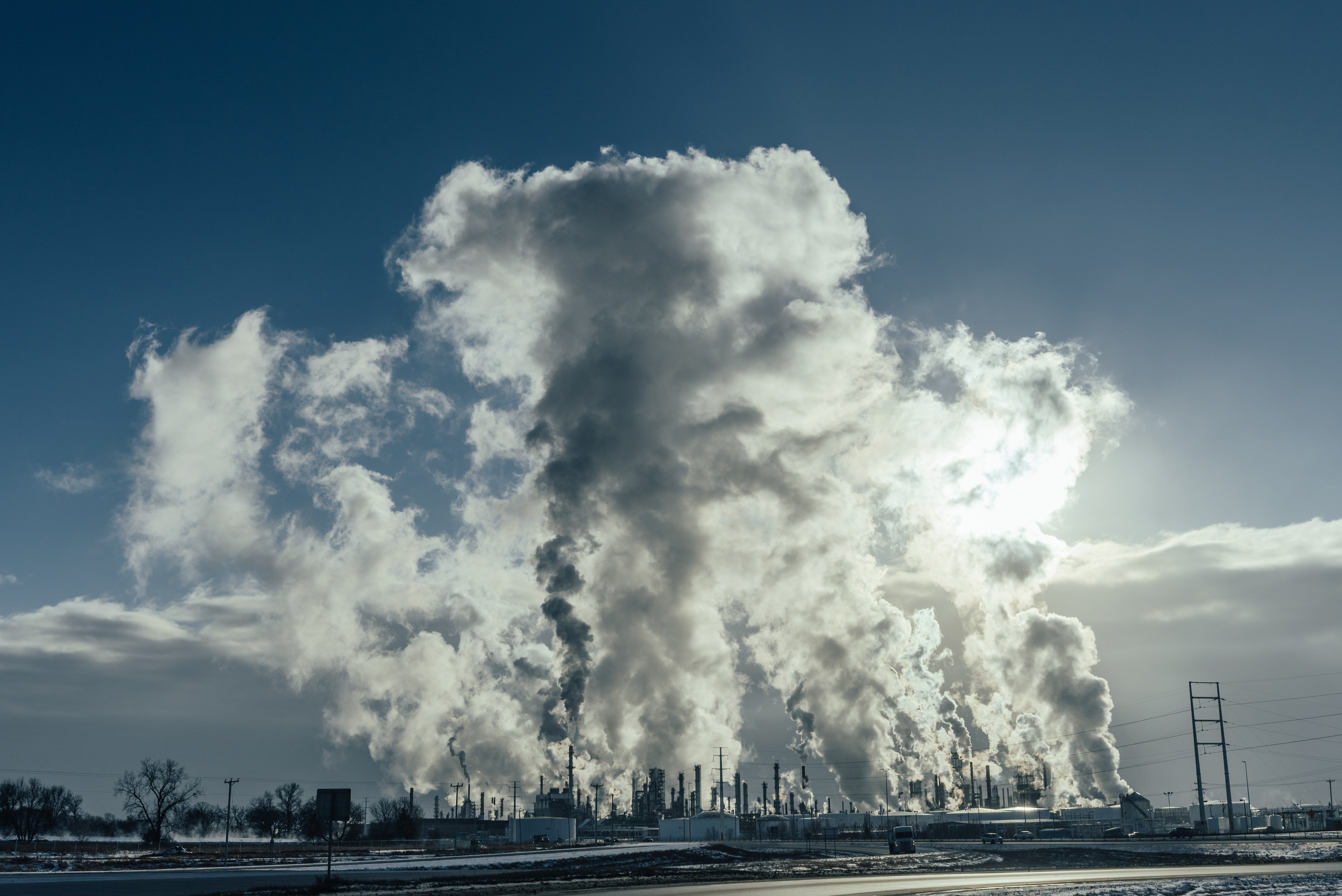
Pine Bend Refinery in 2018

The site was placed on the National Priorities List in 1986, and recovery wells, ground water gradient control, and soil gas extraction were installed and implemented between 1988 and 2004 in order to recover any oil that had been spilled in the storage tank area of the 1,200-acre site during previous decades. Though FHR had paid almost $19 million in environmental fines in the 1990s and 2000, by 1999 the company had begun making changes to improve efficiency and minimize environmental impact. By 2005 the refinery was "producing more gasoline, jet and other fuels while managing to cut harmful emissions into the air, water and ground by more than 50 percent since 1999", and took first place in the annual Minnesota Environmental Initiative awards that year.

The Pine Bend refinery and the northern division of the Koch Pipeline Company won multiple awards in Occupational Safety from the Minnesota Safety Council since 2000, including the Governor's Safety Award for Outstanding Achievement. The awards recognized "a sustained track record of safety performance," as exemplified by "sustained reductions in OSHA recordable incidents by 86 percent at Pine Bend since 1993 and by 86 percent at Koch Pipeline Company's Northern Division since 1995."

The Pine Bend refinery also received four safety awards at the National Petrochemical and Refiners Association (NPRA) conference in 2001. It earned a Clear Air Award from the EPA in 2004 and a Special Recognition Certificate for its Clean Air Awards Program from the EPA in 2005. It also received the Minnesota Conservation Award from Xcel Energy for saving 8.7 million kilowatt hours during 2006. The refinery has been a MNSTAR-designated site since 2005, meaning that the Minnesota Department of Labor and Industry considers it a safe workplace with effective safety and health-management systems.

The refinery earned the Wastewater Treatment Facility Operational Award in 2011 and the Operator Award in 2010 from the Minnesota Pollution Control Agency. It has also earned several American Fuel and Petrochemical Manufacturers' safety awards, including Meritorious Safety Performance and Gold awards. FHR's products terminals in Minnesota have received the Platinum Safety Award from the International Liquid Terminals Association for their commitment to continuous safety improvement. Also, the Pine Bend refinery earned the Minnesota Safety Council's highest safety award, the Award of Honor for three consecutive years, in addition to winning the MSC's Outstanding Achievement Award.

The refinery is also promoting the mainstream use of low-carbon aviation fuel. In collaboration with Delta Air Lines, a facility is being constructed at the refinery capable of blending neat sustainable aviation fuel (SAF) with conventional jet fuel.

== Pipeline system ==
Most petroleum enters and exits the plant through a Koch-owned, 537-mile (864 km) pipeline system that stretches across Minnesota and Wisconsin. 80% of the incoming oil is heavy crude from the Alberta Oil Sands in Canada and is brought from the northwest to the facility through the Lakehead and Minnesota pipelines. Additional crude comes from the south via the Wood River Pipeline, though plans are in place to reverse the flow of that line.

The plant has a dedicated pipeline to the Minneapolis-St. Paul International Airport that provides jet fuel for aircraft. Another major exit route for distilled products is the Wisconsin Pipeline, which brings fuel eastward into the neighboring state. Fuel is also distributed by semi-trailer trucks, railroad cars, and, occasionally, river barges. Pine Bend Refinery dredges sediment from the nearby Mississippi River to ensure that its barges don't bottom out.
