= Gopher Ordnance Works =

American World War II munitions factory

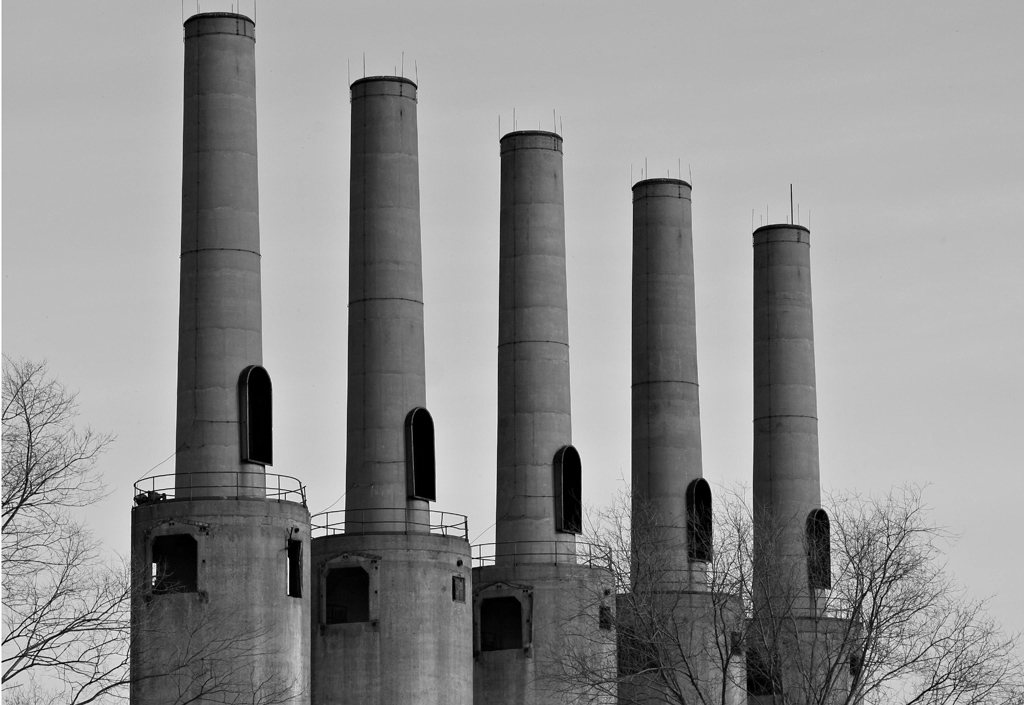
- Chimneys at the abandoned plant, photographed in 2010
- Interactive map of the Gopher Ordnance Works area

General information
- Type: Factory
- Location: Off County Road 46, Near Coates and Rosemount, Minnesota, United States
- Coordinates: 44°43′29″N 93°3′14″W
- Estimated completion: 1943
- Closed: 1945

Technical details
- Grounds: 11,000 acres (4,500 ha)

Gopher Ordnance Works was a smokeless powder production plant near Coates and Rosemount, Minnesota, United States. It was first opened in 1943. The plant was closed soon after the end of World War II. There are some remains still at the original site which is visible from U.S. Route 52 and County Road 46.

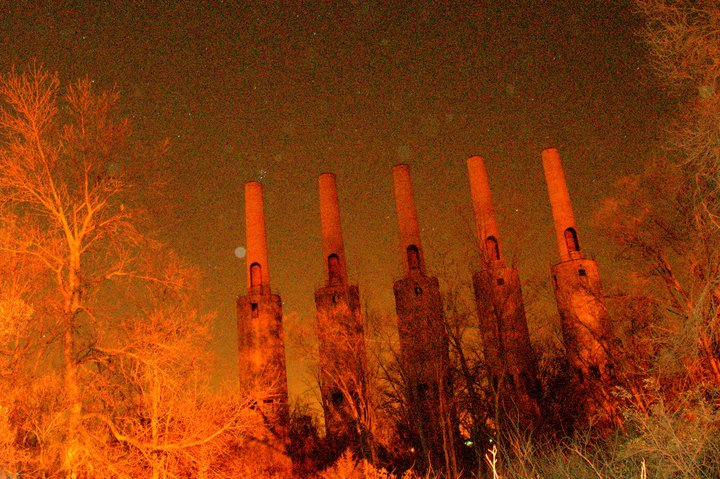
chimneys at night

After the government decided it needed a place to open up another gunpowder factory, they chose Dakota County in East Central Minnesota as their prime spot to put up such a factory, specifically, the city of Rosemount. They soon evicted farmers on 11,000 acres (45 km^{2}) of farmland so that they could build Gopher Ordnance Works, which consisted of 858 buildings.

== General plant information ==
Gopher Ordnance could hold approximately 3,000 employees, however, most of the employees were not hired off site and had already worked in the defense industry. The plant was operated by DuPont. The production lines at Gopher were completed in 1943 and idled until 1944 when the government requested the plant begin production and create three additional production lines. The plant began production in January 1945, and was closed in October of the same year. The gunpowder being produced at the plant was being used for navy artillery shells. The smokestacks were for boiling water that was used to manufacture the gunpowder. The large T-Walls were part of solvent recovery houses. The process involved much volatile material.

== Environmental impact ==
The Minnesota Pollution Control Agency inspected the property in 1981 concluding that based on the limited investigation there was no contamination of concern. The U.S. Army Corps of Engineers began inspections in 1985. In 1999, the U.S. Army Corps of Engineers concluded that the property was eligible for restoration funds. In 2005, the Corps revised its position and stated that only the land transferred to the state in 1947 was eligible, and a detailed investigation was completed in March 2009.

In 2010, the University of Minnesota launched a Remedial Investigation to collect information on the environmental condition of the property.

== Advertising ==
The plant was unable to get employees easily, so it ran ads in local newspapers. One such ad pictured a woman saying, "If you can run a vacuum cleaner, you can do my war job at Gopher".
