= North Dakota Pipeline Company system =

Crude oil pipeline system in US

The North Dakota Pipeline Company (NDPL) system is an 826-mile (1530 km) crude oil pipeline system that collects oil from fields in the Williston Basin in Montana and North Dakota and transports it eastward to other pipeline systems that carry oil to refineries in the Midwest.

The pipeline spans from Plentywood, Montana to Clearbrook, Minnesota. It has a capacity to move 355,000 barrels of oil per day according to a report in 2024.

The company is a joint venture between Enbridge and Williston Basin Pipeline (a subsidiary of Marathon Petroleum).

There are terminals at Grenora, Little Muddy, Trenton, Alexander, Beaver Lodge, Stanley, Berthold, and Minot.
