= Minnesota Labor Relations Act =

1939 labor relations statute

The Minnesota Labor Relations Act is a Minnesota labor relations statute that was enacted in 1939.
