= SPS Commerce =

Software corporation headquartered in Minneapolis, Minnesota, USA

SPS Commerce, Inc.
- Type: Public
- Traded as: Nasdaq: SPSC; S&P 600 component
- Industry: Technology – application software
- Founded: 1987; 39 years ago
- Founder: Gary W Anderson
- Headquarters: Minneapolis, Minnesota, United States
- Key people: Chad Collins (CEO, executive chairman); Kimberly K. Nelson (CFO, Principal Accounting Officer); Jamie Thingelstad (CTO; Dan Juckniess (EVP, CRO); Mike Svatek (CPO); Erica Koenig (SVP, CHRO)
- Services: Supply chain management solutions, EDI
- Revenue: ▲US$752 million (2025)
- Net income: ▲US$93.3 million (2025)
- Number of employees: 2,489 (2023)
- Website: spscommerce.com

SPS Commerce, Inc. is a technology and application software company based in the United States that provides cloud-based supply chain management software. The company's headquarters are located in Minneapolis, Minnesota, but it also has a US office in New Jersey, and international locations in Amsterdam, Beijing, Breukelen, Hong Kong, Kyiv, Melbourne, Montpellier, Sydney, and Toronto.

== History ==
The company was founded in 1987; 39 years ago, under the name St. Paul Software. In 2000, the company sold its software business to Netherlands-based TIE Commerce. After the sale, the company primarily offered internet-based business-to-business (B2B) exchanges for retailers and manufacturers. St. Paul Software was renamed SPS Commerce in May 2001. SPS Commerce went public in April 2010 when it debuted on the NASDAQ global market.

Acquisitions:

- 2011: acquired San Diego–based EDI services company Direct EDI for $10.9 million, adding 40 employees in a San Diego office and a development group in Ukraine.
- 2012: purchased New Jersey–based data analytics firm Edifice for $26M
- 2014: $14.9M acquisition of LeadTec, an EDI provider headquartered in Melbourne, Australia.
- 2016: $23M acquisition of ToolBox Solutions
- 2018: $23M acquisition of CovalentWorks
- 2019: $11.5M acquisition of long-term technology partner MAPADOC
- 2020: $100M acquisition of Data Masons
- 2021: $17M acquisition of Genius Central
- 2022: $45M acquisition of GCommerce
- 2022: $49M acquisition of InterTrade
- 2023: €64.5M acquisition of TIE Kinetix
- 2024: $25M acquisition of Traverse Systems
- 2024: $206M acquisition of SupplyPike
- 2025: $210M acquisition of Carbon6

In December 2025, activist investor Anson Funds Management disclosed a stake in SPS Commerce and pushed the company to explore a sale and consider management changes, arguing the stock price lagged competitors by 40% to 60%.
