= Dakota County Technical College =

Two-year college in Rosemount, Minnesota, US

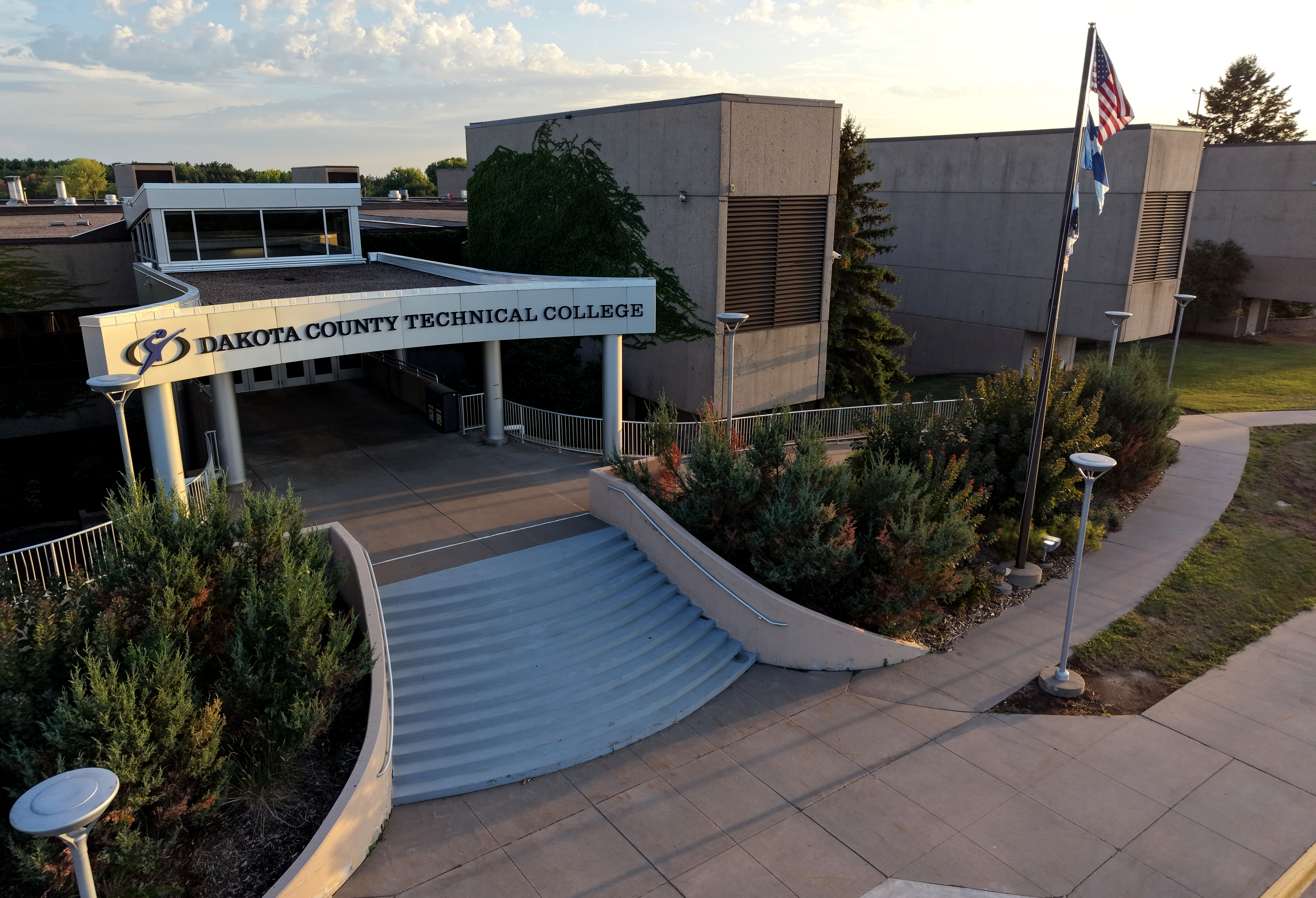
- Motto: "Real Education. Real Results."
- Type: Public technical college
- Established: 1970
- Parent institution: Minnesota State Colleges and Universities System
- Academic affiliations: MnSCU
- President: Michael Berndt
- Faculty: 80 full-time instructors; 100 adjunct
- Administrative staff: 130
- Students: 3,000 full-time and part-time credit students per semester; 6,000 customized training students per year
- Location: Rosemount, Minnesota, United States; 44°44′15″N 93°04′40″W
- Campus: Rosemount campus: Rural; 108 acres (44 ha) owned; 105 acres (42 ha) leased
- Colors: Blue & black
- Nickname: Blue Knights
- Sporting affiliations: NJCAA
- Website: www.dctc.edu

Dakota County Technical College (DCTC) is a public technical college in Rosemount, Minnesota, United States. It is located in Dakota County inside the Minneapolis/St. Paul metropolitan area. DCTC belongs to the Minnesota State Colleges and Universities System and is one of five stand-alone technical colleges in the state.

== History and governance ==
Approved by the 1969 Minnesota State Legislature, Dakota County Technical College started in 1970 with 50 students in three programs. The college's permanent site was a research farm formerly owned and operated by the University of Minnesota. The 185,000-square-foot (17,200 m^{2}) main building opened in 1973, offering 30 academic programs to nearly 700 students.

At the state level, the Minnesota State Colleges and Universities System Board of Trustees serves as the college's governing authority. In 2011, the school received a 10-year re-accreditation without conditions from the North Central Association of Colleges and Schools Commission on Institutions of Higher Education (NCA-CIHE).

The college has had four presidents in its history. David L. Schroeder served from 1970 to 1999. Ronald E. Thomas, Ph.D., was DCTC's president from 1999 to 2013. Tim Wynes, J.D., who also served as president at Inver Hills Community College, led from 2013 to 2018. Starting July 2, 2018, Michael Berndt served as interim president of the two colleges and was confirmed as permanent president of both institutions in March 2020.

== Campus ==
The DCTC main campus is located on the outskirts of Rosemount, Minnesota, a city of 25,650 about 14 miles (23 km) south of St. Paul, the capital of Minnesota. The Rosemount campus houses the majority of the college's instructional programs, which are separated into seven academic departments (see below). The college is going forward with a 22-acre (8.9 ha) prairie grass and wildflower restoration project on the Rosemount campus that is designed and maintained by faculty and students in the Landscape Horticulture program.

DCTC also delivers 10 programs of study in the Business and Management department at the Partners in Higher Education building in Apple Valley Minn., as well as Programming & Development, Microsoft Office, Microsoft Networking, Cisco Networking, Database, IT Foundations, and Web/Graphic Design courses at the IT Training Center in Eagan, Minnesota

== Academics ==
The college has 46 instructional programs under eight academic departments:

- Administrative Support
- Business
- Construction and Manufacturing
- Health and Education
- Marketing and Sales
- STEM Careers
- Transportation
- Visual Arts and Communication
- General Education

The college's General Education department offers individualized studies, general education and transfer curriculum, Minnesota transfer curriculum, and developmental education courses. Awards offered by DCTC include certificates, diplomas, A.S. degrees and A.A.S. degrees.

== Customized training ==
Partnering with more than 100 area businesses and industries, DCTC offers customized continuing education in a number of areas. In a typical year, more than 6,000 students are enrolled in the college's customized training programs.

== Research ==
In 2008, DCTC received a $3 million grant from the National Science Foundation to develop the Midwest Regional Center for Nanotechnology Education (Nano-Link) on the DCTC campus. Deb Newberry, the director of the college's Nanoscience Technology program, was appointed to head Nano-Link, which provides resources and support to colleges delivering nanotechnology education and research throughout a five-state region. Six two-year colleges in North Dakota, Minnesota, Wisconsin, Illinois and Michigan partnered to develop this center.

== Athletics ==
Sports programs at DCTC include women's and men's soccer, softball, baseball, men's basketball, and volleyball.

== Campus life ==
DCTC has a range of student organizations and clubs under the college's Student Life umbrella. Headed by a six-member executive board, the Student Senate manages a budget that funds social activities, scholarships and charitable projects. The Multicultural Student Leadership Organization, DCTC Campus Lions Club, Phi Theta Kappa and SkillsUSA are all active on campus.

== Notable alumni ==
- Derek Chauvin - former Minneapolis police officer and convicted murderer, known for his role in the murder of George Floyd.
