= Rosemount, Minnesota =

City in Minnesota, United States

Rosemount
- City
- Rosemount water tower

- Flag Logo
- Nickname: The “Irish”
- Motto: "Spirit of Pride and Progress"
- Location of the city of Rosemount within Dakota County, Minnesota
- Coordinates: 44°44′28″N 93°7′11″W
- Country: United States
- State: Minnesota
- County: Dakota
- Established (township): 1858
- Incorporated (city): 1972
- Named for: Rosemount, County Westmeath, Ireland

Government
  - Mayor: Jeffery D. Weisensel

Area
  - Total: 35.22 sq mi (91.23 km^{2})
  - Land: 33.25 sq mi (86.13 km^{2})
  - Water: 1.97 sq mi (5.10 km^{2})
- Elevation: 965 ft (294 m)

Population (2020)
  - Total: 25,650
  - Estimate (2025): 31,881
  - Density: 771.4/sq mi (297.82/km^{2})
- Time zone: UTC-6 (Central (CST))
  - Summer (DST): UTC-5 (CDT)
- ZIP code: 55068
- Area code: 651
- FIPS code: 27-55726
- GNIS feature ID: 0650291
- Website: rosemountmn.gov

Rosemount is a city in Dakota County, Minnesota, United States, on the southern edge of the Twin Cities Metropolitan Area. The population was 25,650 at the 2020 census. Rosemount borders the Mississippi River to the northeast and is 20 miles south of Saint Paul. It combines both residential and industrial land use, being home to Dakota County Technical College, the Pine Bend Refinery, and the University of Minnesota owned UMore Park development on the former Gopher Ordnance Works.

== History ==
After the 1851 Treaty of Mendota, which turned the land over to the federal government, the first European settlers began to arrive. In 1853, William Strathern from Scotland was the first to claim land in the area, and in 1854 the Dakota County Board of Commissioners appointed Andrew Keegan as the first postmaster. He named the post office Rosemount after a town in Ireland.

Rosemount was established as one of Dakota County's first 17 townships in 1858, and many of the original settlers were Irish Catholics. According to the city's website, there was some debate over whether to name the township Saratoga or Rosemount, with the latter finally chosen to reflect the town's Irish heritage and remain in keeping with the name given to the post office a few years earlier.

In 1853, Captain William B. Dodd started building one of Minnesota's earliest roads to connect Mendota to St. Peter, Minnesota. His road, later called the Dodd Road, ran through western Rosemount and was the location for several early establishments. Just east of Dodd Road, the Minnesota Central Railway built railroad tracks, a station, and an elevator in the 1860s, and a new commercial center grew up around it.

The Village of Rosemount was founded and platted in 1866 and incorporated in 1875. Another early community in the area, Rich Valley, was on today's 140th street. It had a post office from 1858 to 1935, and a Chicago Great Western depot.

In the 1940s Rosemount was home to a military gunpowder plant, Gopher Ordnance Works, which manufactured white smokeless rifle and cannon powder during World War II. The University of Minnesota acquired a part of this land for agricultural research and other university projects in 1947, later known as UMore Park or the Rosemount Research and Outreach Center.

The Great Northern Oil Company built the Pine Bend Refinery facility on the border of Rosemount and Inver Grove Heights in 1955. The oil refinery, now owned by Flint Hills Resources, is now the Rosemount area's largest private employer.

In 1971, the Village and Township of Rosemount merged and incorporated as a city in 1975.

In 1994, the Rosemount Community Center and National Guard Armory facility was constructed. The Armory is the headquarters for the 1st Armored Brigade Combat Team of the 34th Infantry Division, which is about half of the Minnesota Army National Guard.

== Geography ==
According to the United States Census Bureau, the city has an area of 35.21 square miles (91.19 km^{2}), of which 33.22 square miles (86.04 km^{2}) is land and 1.99 square miles (5.15 km^{2}) is water.

U.S. Highway 52, Minnesota Highway 3, Minnesota Highway 55, and County Road 42 are four of the main routes in Rosemount.

=== Climate ===
Climate data for Rosemount Research and Outreach Center, Minnesota (1991–2020 normals, extremes 1943–present)
Month	Jan	Feb	Mar	Apr	May	Jun	Jul	Aug	Sep	Oct	Nov	Dec	Year
Record high °F (°C)	57 (14)	65 (18)	81 (27)	93 (34)	100 (38)	101 (38)	105 (41)	103 (39)	97 (36)	91 (33)	77 (25)	66 (19)	105 (41)
Mean daily maximum °F (°C)	22.2 (−5.4)	27.0 (−2.8)	39.9 (4.4)	55.8 (13.2)	67.8 (19.9)	77.3 (25.2)	81.3 (27.4)	79.0 (26.1)	72.2 (22.3)	58.6 (14.8)	41.5 (5.3)	27.7 (−2.4)	54.2 (12.3)
Daily mean °F (°C)	12.8 (−10.7)	17.0 (−8.3)	30.2 (−1.0)	44.7 (7.1)	57.2 (14.0)	67.2 (19.6)	71.1 (21.7)	68.7 (20.4)	61.2 (16.2)	47.7 (8.7)	32.5 (0.3)	19.2 (−7.1)	44.1 (6.7)
Mean daily minimum °F (°C)	3.3 (−15.9)	6.9 (−13.9)	20.4 (−6.4)	33.7 (0.9)	46.6 (8.1)	57.1 (13.9)	60.9 (16.1)	58.4 (14.7)	50.1 (10.1)	36.9 (2.7)	23.4 (−4.8)	10.8 (−11.8)	34.0 (1.1)
Record low °F (°C)	−38 (−39)	−37 (−38)	−34 (−37)	4 (−16)	19 (−7)	36 (2)	41 (5)	37 (3)	24 (−4)	9 (−13)	−18 (−28)	−31 (−35)	−38 (−39)
Average precipitation inches (mm)	0.96 (24)	0.90 (23)	1.80 (46)	3.10 (79)	4.32 (110)	4.88 (124)	4.51 (115)	4.43 (113)	3.44 (87)	2.86 (73)	1.71 (43)	1.21 (31)	34.12 (867)
Source: NOAA

== Demographics ==
Historical population
Census	Pop.	Note	%±
1880	116		—
1890	198		70.7%
1900	182		−8.1%
1910	238		30.8%
1920	310		30.3%
1930	294		−5.2%
1940	364		23.8%
1950	567		55.8%
1960	1,068		88.4%
1970	1,337		25.2%
1980	5,083		280.2%
1990	8,622		69.6%
2000	14,619		69.6%
2010	21,874		49.6%
2020	25,650		17.3%
2025 (est.)	31,881		24.3%
U.S. Decennial Census; 2020 Census

=== 2020 census ===
As of the 2020 census, Rosemount had a population of 25,650. The median age was 37.8 years. 28.3% of residents were under the age of 18 and 12.3% of residents were 65 years of age or older. For every 100 females there were 96.0 males, and for every 100 females age 18 and over there were 93.3 males age 18 and over.

93.1% of residents lived in urban areas, while 6.9% lived in rural areas.

There were 8,931 households in Rosemount, of which 41.9% had children under the age of 18 living in them. Of all households, 63.1% were married-couple households, 11.1% were households with a male householder and no spouse or partner present, and 20.3% were households with a female householder and no spouse or partner present. About 18.3% of all households were made up of individuals and 8.1% had someone living alone who was 65 years of age or older.

There were 9,138 housing units, of which 2.3% were vacant. The homeowner vacancy rate was 0.8% and the rental vacancy rate was 3.3%.

Racial composition as of the 2020 census
Race	Number	Percent
White	20,535	80.1%
Black or African American	1,242	4.8%
American Indian and Alaska Native	82	0.3%
Asian	1,507	5.9%
Native Hawaiian and Other Pacific Islander	11	0.0%
Some other race	600	2.3%
Two or more races	1,673	6.5%
Hispanic or Latino (of any race)	1,327	5.2%

=== 2010 census ===
As of the census of 2010, there were 21,874 people, 7,587 households, and 5,918 families living in the city. The population density was 658.5 inhabitants per square mile (254.2/km^{2}). There were 7,853 housing units at an average density of 236.4 per square mile (91.3/km^{2}). The racial makeup of the city was 87.3% White, 3.0% African American, 0.4% Native American, 5.6% Asian, 1.1% from other races, and 2.6% from two or more races. Hispanic or Latino of any race were 3.1% of the population.

There were 7,587 households, of which 46.5% had children under the age of 18 living with them, 65.0% were married couples living together, 8.9% had a female householder with no husband present, 4.0% had a male householder with no wife present, and 22.0% were non-families. 16.6% of all households were made up of individuals, and 5.2% had someone living alone who was 65 years of age or older. The average household size was 2.88 and the average family size was 3.27.

The median age in the city was 34.7 years. 30.7% of residents were under the age of 18; 6.8% were between the ages of 18 and 24; 29.8% were from 25 to 44; 25.2% were from 45 to 64; and 7.7% were 65 years of age or older. The gender makeup of the city was 49.4% male and 50.6% female.

=== 2000 census ===
As of the census of 2000, there were 14,619 people, 4,742 households, and 3,931 families living in the city. The population density was 434.2 inhabitants per square mile (167.6/km^{2}). There were 4,845 housing units at an average density of 143.9 per square mile (55.6/km^{2}). The city's racial makeup was 92.78% White, 2.03% African American, 0.30% Native American, 2.13% Asian, 0.80% from other races, and 1.96% from two or more races. Hispanics or Latinos of any race were 1.83% of the population.

There were 4,742 households, of which 52.4% had children under the age of 18 living with them, 70.1% were married couples living together, 9.1% had a female householder with no husband present, and 17.1% were non-families. 13.0% of all households were made up of individuals, and 4.0% had someone living alone who was 65 years of age or older. The average household size was 3.08 and the average family size was 3.38.

In the city, the population was spread out, with 35.1% under the age of 18, 6.3% from 18 to 24, 36.5% from 25 to 44, 16.8% from 45 to 64, and 5.4% who were 65 years of age or older. The median age was 31 years. For every 100 females, there were 99.1 males. For every 100 females age 18 and over, there were 96.6 males.

The median income for a household in the city was $65,916, and the median income for a family was $68,929 (these figures had risen to $83,826 and $90,644 respectively as of a 2007 estimate). Males had a median income of $45,567 versus $33,247 for females. The per capita income for the city was $23,116. About 2.2% of families and 3.3% of the population were below the poverty line, including 3.2% of those under age 18 and 6.8% of those age 65 or over.

== Arts and culture ==
Rosemount is the only multiple-time host of the USA Broomball National Championships, welcoming competing teams in 2001, 2002, 2003, and 2005. Three different rinks in the area have hosted games in the men's and co-rec divisions.

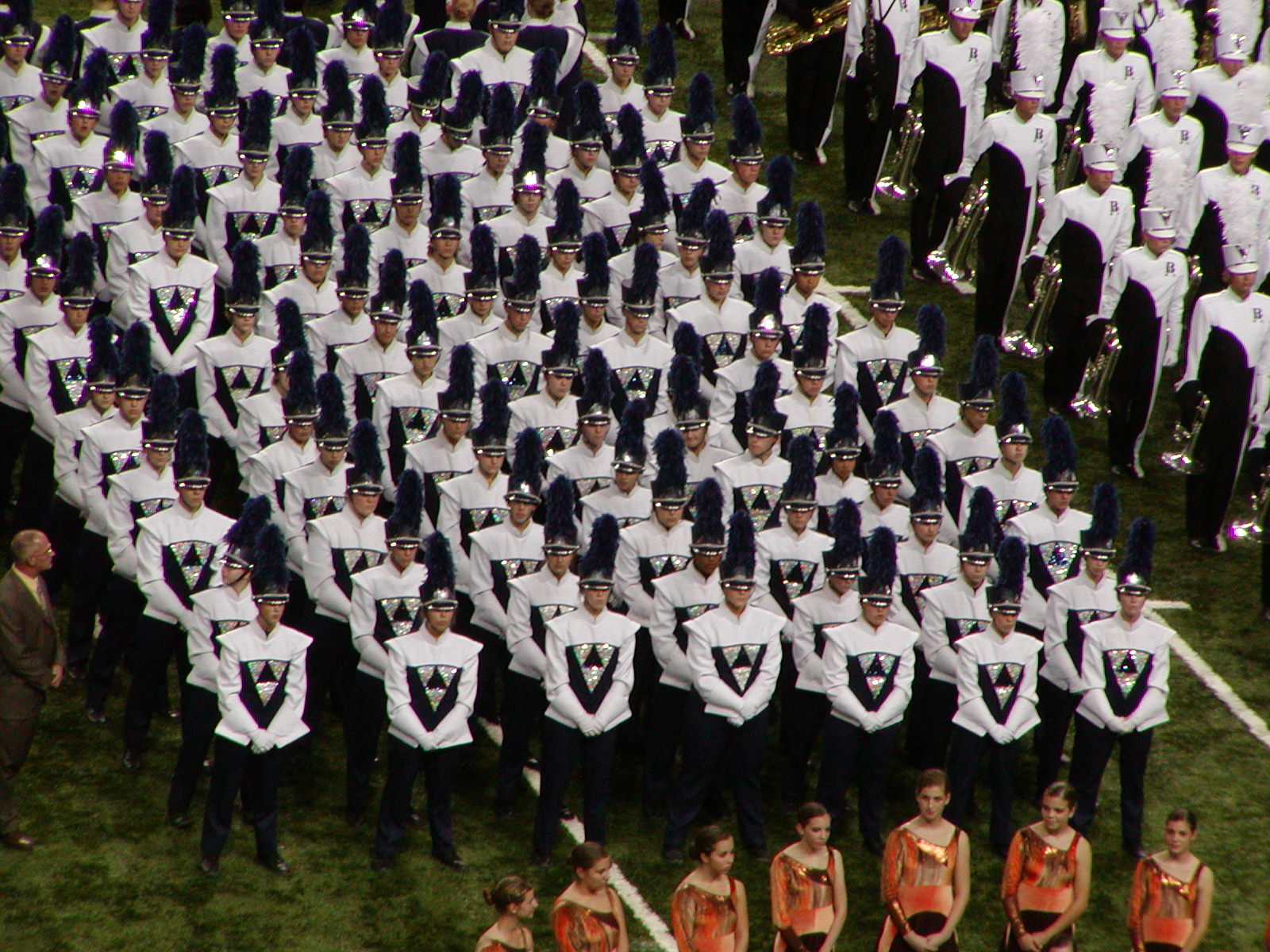
Rosemount High School marching band

Rosemount is also home to the award-winning Rosemount High School Marching Band. In 2024 the band won its 17th State Champion title at the Youth In Music Championship as well as the Bands of America regional championship in Iowa. Rosemount's Band has also marched in the Tournament of Roses Parade as well as the Macy's Thanksgiving Day Parade, and it makes regular appearances at the Minnesota State Fair.

Rosemount also holds Leprechaun Days, a 10-day community festival with many events.

== Government ==
Rosemount is in Minnesota's 2nd congressional district, represented by Angie Craig, a Democrat.

- State Representative: John Huot (Democrat)
- State Senator: Erin Maye Quade (Democrat)
- County Commissioner: District 4 Joe Atkins, District 7 Chris Gerlach (Republican)
- Mayor: Jeffery D. Weisensel
- City Administrator: Logan Martin
Presidential election results

2020 Precinct Results Spreadsheet2016 Precinct Results Spreadsheet2012 Precinct Results Spreadsheet2008 Precinct Results Spreadsheet
Year	Republican	Democratic	Third parties
2020	44.6% 7,063	52.9% 8,382	2.4% 387
2016	45.6% 6,064	45.6% 6,061	8.8% 1,163
2012	50.8% 6,502	47.4% 6,055	1.8% 230
2008	49.5% 5,940	48.7% 5,845	1.8% 213

== Education ==
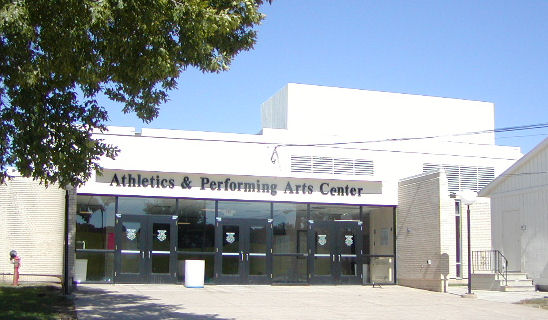
Rosemount High School Athletics and Performing Arts Center

Rosemount is part of Minnesota's Independent School District 196, also known as the Rosemount-Apple Valley-Eagan School District. Public schools in Rosemount include:

- Emerald Trail Elementary School
- Rosemount Elementary School
- Shannon Park Elementary School
- Rosemount Middle School
- Rosemount High School

Private schools in Rosemount include:

- Saint Joseph Catholic School
- Rosemount First Baptist School

Dakota County Technical College is also located in Rosemount.

== Notable people ==
- Robert M. Boche, Wisconsin State Assemblyman
- JT Brown, NHL Player with the Minnesota Wild
- Pierce Butler, Associate Justice of the US Supreme Court
- Tom Compton, Offensive lineman, NFL
- Kirk Cousins, Quarterback, NFL
- Mike Morris, Retired Long-snapper, Minnesota Vikings
- Payton Otterdahl, Olympic Athlete
- Tom Preissing, Retired NHL defenseman
- Mike 'The Marine' Richman, Bellator Featherweight
- Lona Williams, writer/actress/producer
- Bernie Leadon, musician; founding member of the band, The Eagles
