= Mandan Refinery =

Oil refinery in North Dakota

Coordinates: 46°51′00″N 100°53′00″W

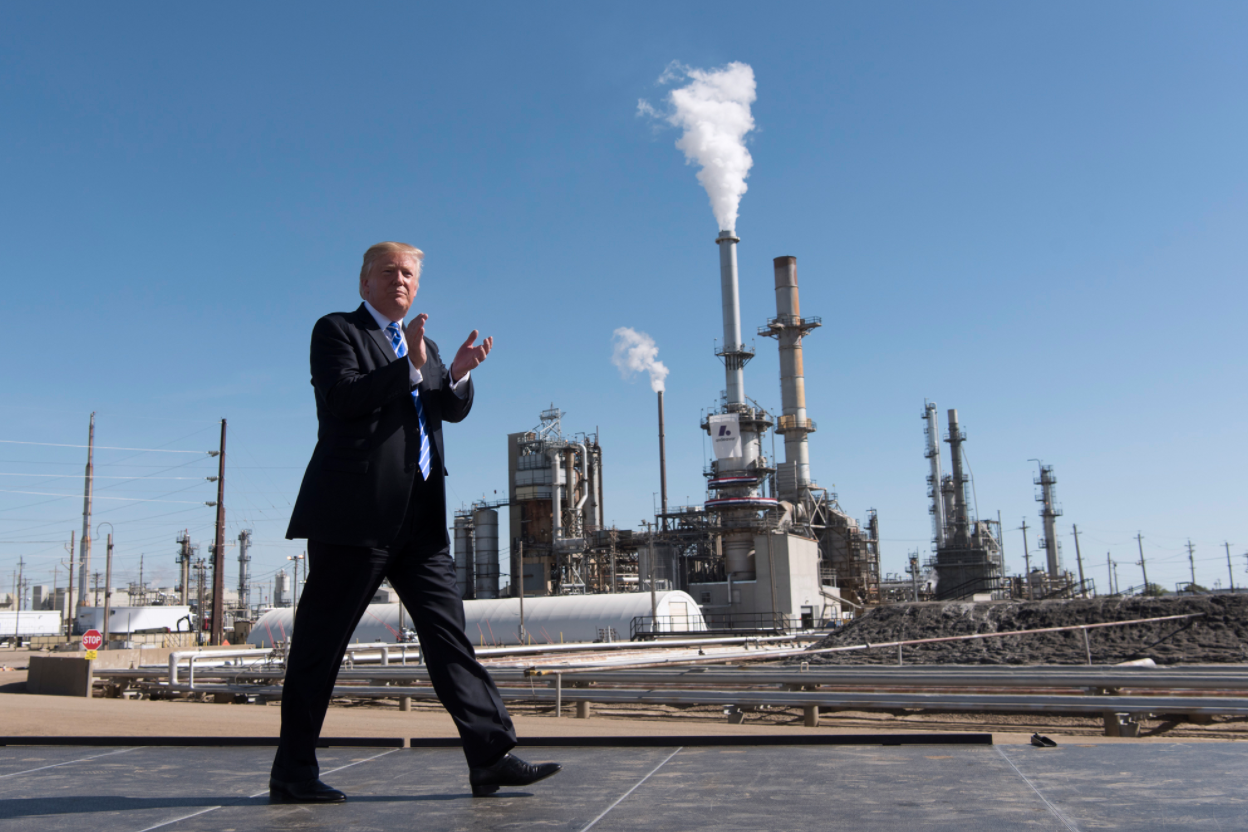
President Donald Trump at Mandan Refinery in 2017

The Mandan Refinery is the largest oil refinery in North Dakota, located within the northeastern corner of the city limits of Mandan just north off Exit 153 of Interstate 94. As of 2022 it has a capacity of 76,000 barrels (12,100 m^{3}) per day. The facility is owned by Marathon Petroleum.

== History ==
Crude oil was first produced in commercial quantities in North Dakota on April 4, 1951. Construction on the refinery began in 1953, and it was completed in 1954. The Standard Oil Company, builder of the 29,000 barrels per day refinery held a grand opening on October 2, 1954. A location along the Missouri River was selected because of the large volumes of water needed by the process units and for power generation. However beginning in the early 1980s, refinery unit expansions have relied almost exclusively on air-cooled equipment.

=== Early Operations ===
It began operations on October 2, 1954 with four process units (pipestill, fluid catalytic cracking unit (FCCU), vapor recovery unit (VRU) and solid-catalyst oligomer or "polymer gasoline" unit) plus a two boiler co-generation steam/electrical powerhouse and associated tankage for crude storage and product blending and shipping. An alkynylation unit began operation the following year; the catalytic reforming unit was added in 1958. Over 2.6 million barrels of oil storage capacity exists at the site.

=== Ownership and name changes ===
A number of ownership and name changes are associated with the facility. American Oil Company was the name used in the upper Midwest by the Standard Oil Company of Indiana but in 1973 shortened it to Amoco Oil Company for marketing purposes. Keeping with the trend in the 1980s for the Standard Oil spinoffs to establish separate identities, Standard Oil Company of Indiana changed its name to Amoco Corporation in 1985. Amoco merged with BP in December 1998 to become BP-Amoco. BP-Amoco sold the Mandan Refinery to Tesoro Corporation on September 6, 2001. Tesoro Corporation underwent a name change on August 1, 2017, to Andeavor after its acquisition of Western Refining. On April 30, 2018, Marathon Petroleum announced it would seek to buy Andeavor and close the deal by the end of 2018.

=== Recent History ===
The refinery hosted President Donald Trump on September 6, 2017, for a speech on tax reform. The visit marks the third time a sitting US president visited the city of Mandan.

== Operations ==
Gasoline accounts for almost 55% of the product volume, but both on-road and off-road diesel fuel account and other distillates such as jet-fuel and furnace oil account for another 35% of the product volume. The remaining volume is largely fuel gas (used on-site), liquidified petroleum gas (LPG) i.e. propane and residual fuel oil. Approximately 40% of the product volume is consumed in the state, with the majority of the remaining volume sold in Minnesota.

=== Facility renovations ===
The original crude furnace was replaced in 1974 with a CO-fired furnace to capture heat from the FCU exhaust as well as burn the carbon monoxide generated as a process byproduct. A sulfur recovery unit was placed on-line in 1986 to lower sulfur dioxide emissions by over 65%. To support an unprecedented demand for distillates in North Dakota's oil patch, a major expansion project was undertaken in 2012 to increase the processing capacity to 68,000 BPD. A wet scrubber was installed on the CO-fired crude furnace to reduce sulfur dioxide emissions further and eliminate stack particulates in 2015. The expansion in 2017 brings the current nameplate processing capacity at the site to almost 74,000 barrels per day.

=== Environmental and safety record ===
The prestigious National Blue Heron Environmental Achievement Award, sponsored by the National Wildlife Federation and supported by the U.S. Fish and Wildlife Service in its North American Waterfowl Management Plan, recognizes outstanding contributions toward the conservation of waterfowl habitat. The Mandan Refinery received the award in 1985 for its "North 40" project.

The North 40 project began in 1974 as a creative way to expand the refinery's wastewater treating system. Championed by then refinery manager William "Bill" Burns, over half of the refinery's 960-acre was devoted to wastewater treatment and wildlife conservation. Nearly 200 bird species and many types of mammals find food, cover and breeding sites in this wildlife habitat.

The facility has achieved multiple safety milestones. In 2011, the U.S. Department of Labor's Occupational Safety and Health Administration (OSHA) recognized the then Tesoro Petroleum refinery in Mandan "for an exemplary workplace safety and health program." The petroleum refinery was designated as a "star" site, the highest level of recognition offered by OSHA's Voluntary Protection Programs. In 2014, its workforce achieved one of the best OSHA Recordable Rate safety performances in the country. In 2015, the refinery logged 3.8 million hours without Days Away From Work (DAFW) injury. In its most recent safety achievement, the Mandan Refinery was awarded the AFPM Silver Safety award in May 2018 as it was among the top 5% of all refining member companies in safety performance.

== Pipeline system ==
The supply of petroleum crude oil enters the plant through an Andeavor Logistics owned and operated 16-inch transmission pipeline pipeline system which connects to a 750-mile network across western North Dakota including the former Bakken Link pipeline. The crude delivery system also maintains multiple interconnects to other pipelines and terminals throughout the Williston Basin as well as interconnects to Canada pipelines. About the time of North Dakota's surge in oil production when it rose from the 9th ranked producer in 2002 to 2nd highest in 2014, that connection was repurposed. The crude oil processed at the facility is now sweet crude oil from North Dakota.

A 10-inch refined products pipeline, now owned and operated by NuStar Energy L.P which departs to the east supplies product terminals in Jamestown-ND, Moorhead-MN, Sauk Center-MN and Rosemount-MN with connections to other pipeline systems at Jamestown and Rosemount. A dedicated pipe for railroad diesel fuel also exists from the refinery to the BNSF Railway railyard south of downtown Mandan. Fuel is also distributed by semi-trailer trucks and railroad cars from its corresponding loading racks located on the refinery proper.
