= List of pipeline accidents in the United States in the 2000s =

The following is a list of pipeline accidents in the United States in the 2000s. It is one of several lists of U.S. pipeline accidents. See also list of natural gas and oil production accidents in the United States.

== Incidents ==
This is not a complete list of all pipeline accidents. For natural gas alone, the Pipeline and Hazardous Materials Safety Administration (PHMSA), a United States Department of Transportation agency, has collected data on more than 3,200 accidents deemed serious or significant since 1987.

A "significant incident" results in any of the following consequences:

- fatality or injury requiring in-patient hospitalization
- $50,000 or more in total costs, measured in 1984 dollars
- liquid releases of five or more barrels (42 US gal/barrel)
- releases resulting in an unintentional fire or explosion.

PHMSA and the National Transportation Safety Board (NTSB) post incident data and results of investigations into accidents involving pipelines that carry a variety of products, including natural gas, oil, diesel fuel, gasoline, kerosene, jet fuel, carbon dioxide, and other substances. Occasionally pipelines are repurposed to carry different products.

=== 2000 ===
- January 1 – In Whitewater, Michigan, two snowmobile riders in the pipeline right of way had mechanical problems and were using a cigarette lighter to see better when leaking natural gas ignited. Both snowmobilers were treated for their burns and released. The pipeline was owned by Michigan Consolidated Gas Company (MICHCON). Investigators found that the pipe, which was installed in 1973, had leaked due to internal corrosion.
- January 10 – Approximately 4,200 gallons of jet fuel were discharged from Plantation Pipeline in Newington, Virginia, some of which entered into Accotink Creek and its adjoining shorelines. The failure resulted from a failed gasket on an interface detector.
- January 21 – A Chevron pipeline leaked from a welding flaw near Corinne, Utah, spilling about 4200 gallons of diesel fuel. The product spread over 38 acres of salt flat and wetlands used by birds. About 75% to 80% of the spill was intentionally burned to eliminate it.
- January 21 – An Equilon Pipeline Co. crude oil line was ruptured off of the Louisiana coast, by an eight-ton anchor dropped by a ship. About 94,000 gallons of crude oil were spilled, creating a slick 2 miles wide by 7 miles long.
- January 27 – In Winchester, Kentucky, a Marathon Oil pipeline accident released about 490,000 US gallons (1,900,000 L) of crude oil. NTSB investigators found a dent on the bottom of the pipe in the rupture area. Marathon spent about $7.1 million in response to the accident.
- February 2 – An Equilon Pipeline Co. pipeline leaked 756 gallons of crude oil, in Jefferson County, Texas, west of Highway 366, causing estimated $75,000 in property damage. Corrosion was listed as the cause of the leak.
- February 5 – A pipeline failed and spilled over 192,000 US gallons (730,000 L) of crude oil in the John Heinz National Wildlife Refuge in Pennsylvania. The source of the spill was a break in a miter bend in the pipe, which was estimated to be at least 50 years old.
- February 18 – A 24-inch diameter Tennessee Gas Pipeline at Marcellus, New York, leaked natural gas due to a crack in the pipe, thought to be caused by a manufacturing defect in the pipe which had been manufactured and installed in 1951.
- February 23 – In Clare County, Michigan, the ANR Pipeline Company’s 12-inch diameter Lincoln Pipeline ruptured. Factors contributing to the leak were frost heave, mismatch of pipe ends, residual forces applied during clamping of the pipe replacement ends to the existing pipeline, unusually cold weather on the day of the rupture, and non-homogeneous material in the weld metal at the origin of the fracture that reduced effective thickness of the pipe wall. The pipe was manufactured in 1951.
- March 9 – An Explorer petroleum products pipeline failed in Greenville, Texas. The 28-inch pipeline ruptured and released 13,436 barrels (2,136.2 m^{3}) of gasoline. The released gasoline eventually reached East Caddo Creek. The banks of the tributary and creek contained the escaping gasoline as it flowed away from the ruptured pipe. The probable cause of the pipeline failure was corrosion-fatigue cracking that initiated at the edge of the longitudinal seam weld at a likely preexisting weld defect. Contributing to the failure was the loss of pipe coating integrity.
- March 17 – About 3300 gallons of crude oil spilled into the Miller Branch Creek bed, near Stiles, Louisiana, when a small oil pipeline was snapped by a falling tree. Approximately 200 yards of the Miller Branch Creek bed, which flows into the James Bayou, was affected. The James Bayou flows in Caddo Lake, two miles south of the spill. Another spill not far from the Stiles site had occurred two days earlier, when 12,600 gallons of crude was discharged into a creek, after a bulldozer ran over a pipeline.
- March 22 – In Karnes County, Texas, a PG&E 20-inch diameter natural gas pipeline blew out through pavement and was on fire eight miles south of Kenedy, Texas, on U.S. Highway 181. Work began the same day to repair the road. The leak was caused by external corrosion of the pipe, which was manufactured in 1961.
- April 7 – A pipeline released fuel oil at Chalk Point, near Aquasco, Maryland. The Piney Point Oil Pipeline system, which was owned by the Potomac Electric Power Company (Pepco), experienced a pipe failure at the Chalk Point Generating Station in southeastern Prince George's County, Maryland. The release was not discovered and addressed by the contract operating company, Support Terminal Services, Inc., until the late afternoon. Approximately 140,400 US gallons (531,000 L) of fuel oil were released into the surrounding wetlands and Swanson Creek and, subsequently, the Patuxent River as a result of the accident. No injuries were caused by the accident, which cost approximately $71 million for environmental response and clean-up operations.
- May 2 – In Greenville, Mississippi, six workers were injured during a turbine construction project at the Williams Gas Pipeline-Southcentral natural gas compressor station. A flash fire occurred when contractor employees were beginning to install an isolation cap on a 26-inch diameter natural gas line. The fire extinguished itself. Evidence available has not allowed determination of cause.
- May 13 – At a Texas Eastern Transmission Corporation (Duke) compressor station in Perry County, Pennsylvania, the emergency shutdown device was activated by a lightning strike to the compressor unit gas monitor. All equipment operated properly with the exception of a suction valve that malfunctioned and did not close automatically. This allowed gas to continue venting to atmosphere in a controlled manner for nearly an hour until the valve was manually closed. The part was installed in 1958.
- May 19 – A Colonial Pipeline Co. line failed near Greensboro, North Carolina. At least 714 gallons (17 barrels) of kerosene spilled, some of which entered a pond that flows into a tributary of the East Fork Deep River. The kerosene spill caused a sheen about 40 feet by 40 feet in the pond. As a result of this, and six other previous Colonial Pipeline accidents, the EPA fined Colonial $34 million in 2003.
- June 7 – A stopple fitting weld failed on a Wolverine Pipeline Company line, causing a rupture releasing 75,000 US gallons (280,000 L) of gasoline into the environment, and causing the evacuation of more than 500 houses in Blackman Charter Township, Michigan. The failure caused the shutdown of 30% of Michigan's gasoline supplies for nine days, contaminated a creek which flows into the Grand River, and a railroad track near the failure site was shut down for a week. Later tests found 715 anomalies in this pipeline. Wolverine later agreed to pay for switching houses in the area from local water wells to a city water source.
- June 28 – In Prentiss, Mississippi, an 8-inch high-pressure natural gas pipeline ruptured, releasing gas. A local landowner notified the Prentiss Volunteer Fire Department and AIM Pipeline Company gas control of the leak. The gas ignited within half an hour. No effort was made to extinguish the fire; it was allowed to burn under control. Within three hours the fuel had been consumed and the fire was contained. As a precaution, the Prentiss Volunteer Fire Department evacuated three nearby residences. All residents were allowed to return to their homes that evening. There were no injuries and no major property damage. The rupture in the pipe measured six inches by three inches. The rupture point in the pipe was in a low-lying area on the bottom of the line approximately two inches from a joint weld. The pipe was installed in 1975.
- July 5 – Two boats hit a Southern Natural Gas pipeline off the coast of Plaquemines, Louisiana, causing a gas fire that burned five members of the boat crews. The fire could be seen from 35 miles away.
- August 19 – A 30-inch-diameter (76 cm) El Paso Natural Gas pipeline rupture and fire near Carlsbad, New Mexico killed 12 members of an extended family who were camping more than 600 feet (180 m) from the rupture point. The force of the escaping gas created a 51-foot-wide (16 m) crater about 113 feet (34 m) along the pipe. The explosion ejected a 49-foot (15 m) section of the pipe from the crater, in three pieces measuring approximately 3 feet (0.91 m), 20 feet (6.1 m), and 26 feet (7.9 m) in length. The largest piece of pipe was found about 287 feet (87 m) northwest of the crater. The cause of the failure was severe internal corrosion of the pipe, which was manufactured in 1950. On July 26, 2007, a USDOJ Consent Decree was later entered into by the pipeline owner to perform pipeline system upgrades to allow better internal pipeline inspections.
- August 20 – A gas pipeline exploded and burned in Concord, North Carolina. A nearby shopping mall was evacuated but there were no injuries.
- August 24 – A 6-inch pipeline operated by Chevron failed from alleged external corrosion, spilling 126,000 gallons of crude oil into an unnamed creek, near Snyder, Texas. The creek was dry at the time. Later, a Federal Court ruled that the Clean Water Act did not apply, since there was no water flowing in the creek at the time.
- August 28 – In Denver City, Texas, an El Paso Natural Gas Company 30-inch-diameter (76 cm) pipeline leak was discovered in a farmer’s field after EPNG was informed of darkened soil. After the line was excavated, the leak was found at a weld failure where a mechanical clamp repaired an older leak adjacent to the long seam of the pipe, which was manufactured in 1948.
- September 7 – On State Route 36 south of Abilene, Texas, a bulldozer ruptured a 12-inch diameter NGL pipeline, which exploded. An Abilene police detective with 21 years of service was severely burned when the vapors ignited; he later died. Nearby, a woman saved herself by going underwater in her swimming pool, but her house was destroyed by the explosion and fire. The pipeline's owner, ExxonMobil, was fined by the Texas Railroad Commission for not marking the pipeline's location.
- September 26 – In Mission, Texas, a Kinder Morgan 12-inch diameter pipe ruptured due to external corrosion. The pipe was manufactured in 1956.
- September 27 – In Spearman, Texas, a 26-inch diameter pipe owned by Kinder Morgan’s Natural Gas Pipeline Company of America sprung a pinhole leak at a butt weld. The pipe was manufactured in 1947.
- October 12 – In Edna, Texas, a Tennessee Gas Pipeline 24-inch diameter pipe manufactured in 1944 ruptured. Investigators reported that a weld cracked due to external corrosion.
- November 3 – A front end loader punctured an 8-inch pipeline carrying Diesel fuel in Lancaster County, Pennsylvania. Diesel fuel sprayed 40 feet (12 m) into the air. The fuel flowed for over 2 hours before stopping, and contaminating the area with more than 40,000 US gallons (150,000 L) of Diesel fuel.
- November 28 – In Portland, Tennessee, a Tennessee Gas Pipeline Company maintenance crew was welding an oil lubrication line at a compressor station when an explosion and flash fire occurred, injuring three workers. Apparently, gas from the compressor migrated into a crankcase and was ignited by a spark. The equipment was installed in 1950.
- December 4 – Near Baytown, Texas, an El Paso Field Services 30-inch diameter pipeline ruptured and gas blew into the air. The Beach City fire department reported a flume of natural gas but no fire at the junction of Highway 565 and Needlepoint Road (FM 2354) and partially evacuated the area. The pipe was manufactured and installed in 1955.
- December 16 – An incident occurred at an Illinois Power Company natural gas plant in Irving, Illinois. While conducting a routine inspection, the plant operator determined that water should be transferred from the water separator tank to the produced water holding tank and began to transfer the water. When he no longer heard water flowing through the transfer line, he closed the valve, but then abnormal sounds came from the holding tank. Seconds later, a violent roar erupted and the lights went out. Scanning outside with a flashlight, he saw large pieces of metallic debris. The 50,000 gallon water holding tank was dislodged from its foundation and moved about 300 feet. A factor contributing to the accident was severe weather conditions: temperature 5 degrees Fahrenheit, wind velocity 35 mph gusting to 40-45 mph, wind chill minus 35 to 45 degrees Fahrenheit.

=== 2001 ===
- January 4 – Williams Gas Pipeline - Southcentral (Texas Gas Transmission) was notified that gas was heard blowing in a field 5 miles west of Shelby, Mississippi. Natural gas was leaking from an 18-inch diameter pipeline in Bolivar County. Property damage was confined to company facilities in a crop field where there were no dwellings along the pipeline corridor. Investigators uncovered the pipe to find a fracture about 30 inches long circumferentially in a wrinkle bend of the pipe, which was manufactured in 1940.
- January 4 – A circumferential split in a sharp wrinkle bend caused a leak in a 22-inch diameter natural gas transmission pipeline in Harrisonville, Missouri. The pipe, owned by Panhandle Eastern Pipeline Company, was manufactured in 1931.
- January 15 – In Lehi, Utah, Questar Gas Company received notification that a Questar line was blowing. A Questar employee arrived on-scene and found that the blowing 20-inch high-pressure (300 psi) steel pipeline had been hit by a Caterpillar front end loader at an aboveground span that went about 20 feet across a ravine. Investigation revealed that during the previous night, the front end loader had been stolen from a nearby sand and gravel pit. It is believed that the vandals hotwired the front end loader and used it to pull two trucks from the mud in the hills above the scene of the incident. They then rolled the front end loader down the hill, where it struck the pipeline and tore a 9-inch by 3-inch hole in the pipe. The total property damage was $300,838 ($277,838 was the market value of the lost gas, and $23,000 was the cost of the repair).
- January 17 and 18 – A series of gas explosions hit downtown Hutchinson, Kansas, resulting in 2 deaths, and 2 buildings being destroyed. Later, it was discovered that gas was leaking from an underground gas storage cavern in the area.
- March 22 – In Eustis, Florida, a Florida Gas Transmission Company (Enron) pipeline had a fire when venting gas from a 24-inch diameter pipeline ignited during a planned blowdown. The fire was extinguished about 40 minutes after it ignited. Damage from the fire was limited to company equipment, a backhoe, and adjacent power lines. The cause of the gas ignition is not known.
- April 1 – A Dome Pipeline in North Dakota carrying gasoline ruptured and burst into flames a few miles west of Bottineau, North Dakota. An estimated 1.1 million US gallons (4,200 m^{3}) of gasoline burned before the pipeline could be shut down. The company attributed the break to damage by an "outside force", which a Bottineau County Sheriff said appeared to be frost that melted at uneven rates, twisting and breaking the pipeline.
- April 13 – In Glasco, Kansas, dead vegetation was spotted on a flyover along a natural gas transmission pipeline right-of-way. The vegetation was killed by escaping gas. The cause of the leak was a split in a seam near a girth weld on a 36-inch diameter Kinder Morgan Natural Gas Pipeline Company of America line. The pipe was manufactured in 1960.
- April 14 – A 6-inch petroleum productions failed near Harwood, North Dakota, spilling 40 barrels of fuel oil. There were no injuries. The failure was due to an ERW seam failure, with this particular pipeline having had other ERW seam failures in the past in 1987 and 1993.
- May 1 – A MAPCO 10-inch propane pipeline exploded and burned, in Platte County, Missouri. 13,500 barrels of propane were burned.
- May 24 – A bulldozer being used in Taylor County, Texas hit a petroleum pipeline, causing a large petroleum fire. There were no injuries.
- June 13 – In Pensacola, Florida, at least ten persons were injured when two Gulf South Pipeline natural gas lines ruptured and exploded after a parking lot gave way beneath a cement truck at a car dealership. The blast sent chunks of concrete flying across a four-lane road, and several employees and customers at neighboring businesses were evacuated. About 25 cars at the dealership and ten boats at a neighboring business were damaged or destroyed. The eight-inch diameter pipeline was installed in 1943.
- July 8 – A Columbia Gas Transmission Corp. pipeline at Corrine, West Virginia, was damaged by cataclysmic flooding of the Guyandotte River, which washed out 200 feet of pipe where it crossed over the river. Due to washed out roads and bridges and dangerous flooding in the area, it took 5 hours for the crew to reach shutoff valves on both sides of the washout.
- July 24 – A pipeline ruptured and spread burning gasoline near Manheim, Pennsylvania.
- August 11 – At approximately 5:05 a.m. MST, an El Paso Natural Gas 24-inch gas transmission pipeline failed near Williams, Arizona, resulting in the release of natural gas. The natural gas continued to discharge for about an hour before igniting. Stress corrosion cracking was determined to be the cause of the failure.
- August 12 – A bulldozer hit a 14-inch LP gas pipeline near Weatherford, Texas, causing a massive fire. One person was injured.
- August 17 – An Oklahoma crude oil pipeline ruptured after being struck by a machine cleaning roadside ditches, sending oil 30 feet (9.1 m) into the air and damaging nearby cotton crops with up to 150,000 US gallons (570,000 L) spilled.
- September 3 – At approximately 1 p.m. CST, a rupture occurred near the intersection of the 22-inch diameter T-ML Pipeline and the Black Bayou in Louisiana, resulting in the release of an estimated 8.00 to 13.00 million ft^{3} (227 to 368 thousand m^{3}) of natural gas. In addition, the liquids loss is estimated to be 15,000 gallons. The pipe was manufactured in 1926. The Mid-Louisiana Gas pipeline ruptured and leaked due to internal corrosion.
- October 4 – A drunken man used a rifle to shoot a hole in the Alaskan Pipeline. More than 285,000 gallons of crude oil were spilled, costing more than $13 million to clean up. The man was later convicted and sentenced to 16 years in prison.
- October 15 – A 6-inch diameter ConocoPhillips LPG pipeline failed near Sweeny, Texas, forcing 2 dozen residents to evacuate. About 195,000 gallons of LPG were lost.
- November 7 – In Westernport, Maryland, a Columbia Gas of Maryland natural gas pipeline built in 1907 was impacted when a wildfire burning on the mountainside crossed over the area and ignited small leaks “that were on a regular monitoring schedule.”
- November 13 – In Waverly, Kansas, road salt corroded an aboveground eight-inch Williams Gas Pipeline Central pipeline, inducing a leak due to external corrosion of the pipe, which was manufactured in 1977.
- Around November 27 – Approximately 2,575 barrels of Jet A Kerosene (Jet Fuel) discharged from the P-62 pipeline of the TEPPCO Pipeline System into tributaries of the Neches River and the Neches River itself. The release occurred 4 miles southeast of Vidor, Texas. This spill was caused by disbonded coating and external corrosion on the pipeline. This incident was later part of a U.S. Environmental Protection Agency consent decree.
- December 14 – An anhydrous ammonia spill near Algona, Iowa killed nearly 1.3 million fish, the largest fish kill on that state's record-to-date, Iowa state officials said. More than 58,000 US gallons (220,000 L) of anhydrous ammonia over a nine-hour period spilled into Lotts Creek and the Des Moines River, killing minnows, bass and other game fish. Koch Industries owned the 8-inch pipeline, and was doing maintenance work on a valve on the pipeline. The plume drifted over a six-mile (10 km) area causing officials to evacuate residents in its path.

=== 2002 ===
- January 6 – An El Paso Field Services natural gas pipeline was damaged at Schutenburg, Texas, when a log drift created by heavy rains and flooding hit the pipeline, creating longitudinal strain stressing a coupling, which separated. The coupling was located approximately 15' landward from the riverbank. The pipe depth at the location of the leak was 84 inches.
- January 26 – A Northern Natural Gas Company (Enron) underwater natural gas transmission pipeline sprung a leak through a pinhole rupture due to internal corrosion in the body of a 24-inch diameter pipe manufactured in 1981.
- February 6 – An 8-inch diesel pipeline was found to be leaking in Salt Lake City, Utah. About 14,600 gallons of fuel were leaked, with about 5,900 of it recovered. The cause was from external corrosion.
- February 8 – A trenching machine with a new rock bit being tested hit a 20-inch diameter gas transmission pipeline in Noble County, Oklahoma, causing an explosion that killed the trencher operator.
- February 20 – In a “high consequence area”, at Longview, Texas, a Voyageur Pipeline natural gas gathering line leaked due to bacterial corrosion causing two holes in the pipe. Twelve people were evacuated from the area as a precautionary measure. The eight-inch diameter pipe was manufactured in 1956.
- February 21 – A Sunoco 12 inch pipeline was found to be leaking refined petroleum products, in Tinicum, Pennsylvania. About 15,000 gallons were spilled. The cause was external corrosion.
- March 6 – Near Jeffersonville, Kentucky, a 26-inch diameter Tennessee Gas Pipeline ruptured in a compressor station yard, causing a fire and explosion that did more than $2 million in property damage. The failure originated at a manufacturing defect which caused a weld to crack. The pipe was manufactured in 1950. 30 families in the area voluntarily evacuated. There were no injuries.
- March 13 – A Buckeye Partners pipeline ruptured due to internal corrosion in Wren, Ohio, spilling about 1500 gallons of gasoline.
- Around March 13 – Approximately 20 barrels of oil or jet fuel were discharged from a portion of the Plantation Pipeline in Alexandria, Virginia, some of which entered into an unnamed tributary of Hooff Run and its adjoining shorelines. The pipeline failure appears to have resulted from a hole in the pipeline caused by high-voltage arcing between the pipeline and a utility pole anchor.
- March 15 – A failure occurred on a 36-inch gas pipeline near Crystal Falls, Michigan. The failure resulted in a release of gas, which did not ignite, that created a crater 30 feet (9.1 m) deep, 30 feet (9.1 m) wide, and 120 feet (37 m) long. There were no deaths or injuries.
- April 6 – A BP-Amoco pipeline ruptured and released about 100,000 US gallons (380,000 L) of oil into a coastal area known as Little Lake in Louisiana.
- May 22 – An 8-inch petroleum products pipeline failed, spilling about 2,000 barrels of unleaded gasoline on to a wheat field near Ottawa, Kansas. Booms had to be deployed in nearby creeks. The pipe failed along a seam, possibly due to LF-ERW pipeline failure issues.
- May 29 – A Central Hudson Gas & Electric Corporation pipeline at Poughkeepsie, New York leaked after being punctured by a driller who struck the 12-inch diameter gas transmission line. Because it was a “high consequence area,” 180 people were evacuated as a precautionary measure.
- June 20 – PHMSA ordered the Columbia Gas Transmission Company to do extensive repair to one of their gas transmission pipelines in the states of Pennsylvania and New York, after finding extensive wall thinning on sections of that pipeline system caused by external corrosion. Approximately 800 anomalies with wall thickness losses of greater than 65 percent were found during a smart pig examination, with 76 of the found anomalies having a wall thickness loss of greater than 80 percent. Many of the affected sections of pipe were older sections lacking coating, which is known to reduce external corrosion on pipelines.
- July 4 – There was a rupture of an Enbridge Pipeline, and release of crude oil near Cohasset, Minnesota. The pipeline ruptured in a marsh in Itasca County, spilling 6,000 barrels (950 m^{3}) of crude oil. In an attempt to keep the oil from contaminating the Mississippi River, the Minnesota Department of Natural Resources set a controlled burn that lasted for one day and created a smoke plume about 1 mile (1.6 km) high and 5 miles (8 km) long. The pipe failed due to cracking caused by train shipping induced cracking of the pipe being delivered.
- July 21 – A overpressure incident at a Sunoco pipeline terminal, in Sinking Spring, Pennsylvania lead to a spill of about 18,900 gallons of gasoline. There were no injuries.
- July 22 – Kinder Morgan’s KN Interstate Gas Transmission 12-inch diameter natural gas pipeline at Lodgepole, Nebraska ruptured due to galvanic corrosion on an interior seam weld. The pipe was manufactured in 1954. The instantaneous release of gas was ignited, probably by overhead electric power lines. The fire burned farm crops in vicinity of rupture along with the power pole and some power lines.
- July 24 – A gas explosion leveled a Hopkinton, Massachusetts house, killing a 4-year-old girl and her 5-year-old sister. A failed sleeve on the gas line in the basement of the house was suspected of being the cause.
- August 5 – A natural gas pipeline exploded and caught fire west of Rt. 622, on Poca River Road near Lanham, West Virginia. Emergency workers evacuated three or four families. Kanawha and Putnam Counties in the area were requested to shelter in place. Parts of the pipeline were thrown hundreds of yards away, around and across Poca River. The fire was not contained for several hours because valves to shut down the line did not exist. The orange glow from the fire at 11 PM; could be seen for several miles. The explosion and fire caused $2,735,339 of property damage. The Columbia Gas Transmission Corporation's 30-inch diameter pipeline ruptured due to earth movement (a landslide on an unstable slope) which stressed and buckled the steel pipe installed in 1969.
- September 20 – At around 22:10, a gasoline leak from an 8-inch pipeline operated by Cenex Pipeline (terminal) was discovered near Glendive, Montana. The release of about 1,000 barrels (160 m^{3}) of unleaded gasoline flowed into Seven Mile Creek, and then downstream to its confluence with the Yellowstone River. Several trenches were constructed near the ruptured pipe for product collection points. As of September 25, 2002, a vacuum truck had recovered approximately 21,000 US gallons (79,000 L) of gasoline [and water] from the boomed locations and trenches.
- October 8 – In St. John The Baptist County, Louisiana, a natural gas transmission pipeline failed due to a pinhole leak in the seam of a joint in a 20-inch diameter pipe on Bridgeline Gas Distribution's Riverlands system. The pipeline was installed in 1962. The seam failure was barely visible to the naked eye.
- November 2 – A Chevron pipeline ruptured near Corinne, Utah, spilling about 450 barrels of petroleum. The cause was from external corrosion.
- November 27 – A construction crew had hit a gas line in Lafayette, Indiana. The first of 4 individual house explosions happened about 20 minutes later. 4 people were injured.
- December 10 – A farmer plowing a field hit and ruptured a Williams Companies pipeline, near Lawrence, Kansas. About 4,700 gallons of gasoline were spilled. Later, it was noted that particular pipeline lacked soil coverage in places, including some exposed spots. There were no injuries.

=== 2003 ===
- January 7 – At a "high consequence area" in Anaheim, California, a downed power line struck a Southern California Gas casing vent; electricity traveled along the casing and arced onto the natural gas transmission line inside the casing, perforating the steel pipe with a one-inch puncture. Two more leaks were found at locations where the electricity left the transmission line. The pipe was manufactured in 1947.
- January 24 – An Enbridge crude oil pipeline ruptured at a terminal in Douglas County, Wisconsin. Some of the crude oil flowed into the Nemadji River. Over 100,000 US gallons (380,000 L) were spilled.
- February 2 – A natural gas pipeline ruptured near Viola, Illinois, resulting in the release of natural gas which ignited. A 16-foot section of the pipe fractured into three sections, which were ejected to distances of about 300 yards from the failure site. The 24-inch diameter natural gas transmission pipeline ruptured and a fire resulted on the ANR southwest mainline about 5 miles upstream of the New Windsor compressor station. Thirty people were evacuated as a precaution. Investigators found that the failure occurred in part due to cold weather acting on a major sag bend passing under a creek bed. The ambient temperatures contributed to pipe contraction and saturated soil over the pipe increased frost heave, apparently flexing the pipe until it separated around its circumference at a seam. The pipe was manufactured in 1949.
- February 20 – A 24-inch gas transmission pipeline started leaking in Scott County, Missouri, underneath the Mississippi River. A shifted pipeline weight had caused damage to the pipeline.
- Around February 22 – Approximately 788 barrels of gasoline were discharged from a portion of Plantation Pipeline in Hull, Georgia, some of which entered into an unnamed tributary of East Sandy Creek and its adjoining shorelines. The spill resulted from a failed gasket on a buried block valve.
- February 27 – Dropping temperatures caused an Enbridge pipeline to fail in Samaria, Michigan. 130 barrels of crude oil were spilled.
- March 13 – A seam failed on an 8-inch Dixie Pipeline propane line near Appling, Georgia, releasing about 110,000 gallons of propane. There were no injuries. The pipe split due to seam failure.
- March 23 – A 24-inch El Paso Natural Gas pipeline near Eaton, Colorado, exploded. The explosion sent flames 160 meters in the air, forcing evacuations. No one was injured. The heat from the flames melted the siding of two nearby houses and started many smaller grass fires.
- April 1 – A 12-inch ConocoPhillips petroleum products pipeline ruptured, spilling about 1,000 barrels of diesel fuel near Ponca City, Oklahoma, with most of the fuel getting into Doga Creek. There were no injuries. Low frequency ERW pipe seam failure was suspected as the cause.
- April 2 – In Playa del Rey, California, atmospheric corrosion caused a pinhole leak on a Southern California Gas instrument gas supply line, resulting in an unplanned emergency shutdown. After shutdown, the blowdown released natural gas and liquids (crude oil and water) into the atmosphere, causing mist damage to neighboring homes, landscaping and vehicles. The faulty part was installed in 1970. Public and private property damage was $2,395,000.
- May 1 – A 26-inch Williams Companies natural gas transmission pipeline failed near Lake Tapps, Washington. About 120 people were evacuated from a neighboring elementary school, a supermarket, and 30 to 40 houses in approximately a 4-mile (6.4 km) area. There was no fire or injuries. Land movement was suspected at first, but the failure was later determined to be from stress corrosion cracking. There were four previous failures on this pipeline in the preceding eight years. The pipe was manufactured and installed in 1956.
- May 8 – An 8-inch LPG pipeline failed near Lebanon, Ohio. About 80 houses and one school in the area were evacuated. There was no fire or injuries.
- May 20 – A 30-inch gas transmission pipeline exploded and burned near Nederland, Texas. The cause of the failure was internal corrosion, and the damages were estimated to be $6,901,322. The Houston Pipeline Company explosion did public and private property damage of $5,170,000. The cause of the leak was galvanic corrosion on the part installed in 1975. The rupture and fire damaged nearby electric lines and several unoccupied buildings that were part of the Sunoco terminal facility.
- June 17 – In West Salem, Wisconsin, a canoeist reported seeing bubbles in the Lacrosse River and noted the pipeline signs. Investigators found a Northern Natural Gas pipe exposed in the river bottom. The leak was from a circumferential crack that appeared to have started to crease in the pipe during its original installation in 1963.
- July 2 – A small single engine aircraft had mechanical failure shortly after takeoff from the Linden, New Jersey, airport and was forced to attempt an emergency landing at the Texas Eastern Transmission Corporation (Duke) compressor station. The aircraft collided with some pipeline facilities resulting in nearly $60,000 damage to the natural gas compressor station.
- July 2 – Excavation damage to a natural gas distribution line resulted in an explosion and fire in Wilmington, Delaware. A contractor hired by the city of Wilmington to replace sidewalk and curbing, dug into an unmarked natural gas service line with a backhoe. Although the service line did not leak where it was struck, the contact resulted in a break in the line inside the basement of a nearby building, where gas began to accumulate. A manager for the contractor said that he did not smell gas and therefore did not believe there was imminent danger and that he called an employee of the gas company and left a voice mail message. At approximately 1:44 p.m., an explosion destroyed two residences and damaged two others to the extent that they had to be demolished. Other nearby residences sustained some damage, and the residents on the block were displaced from their houses for about a week. Three contractor employees sustained serious injuries. Eleven additional people sustained minor injuries.
- July 3 – A jury found Texas-New Mexico Pipeline (TNMP) Company guilty of fraud, gross negligence and willful misconduct in concealing a 1992 crude oil pipeline leak beneath a Midland, Texas, residential subdivision, before selling the pipeline to EOTT Energy in 1999. Oil was discovered in the water table in late 2000, and in March 2001 a group of Midland residents sued EOTT, TNMP and Equilon. Residents living on affected land also received settlements. The spill was estimated in 2003 to be 9,000–13,000 barrels. 190 boxes full of TNMP documents about the pipeline dating from the late 1980s to early 1990s (prior to EOTT Energy taking over the pipeline) were dug up from a 45-foot-deep hole at a site along the company's pipeline in New Mexico.
- July 10 – A 16-inch diameter Citgo petroleum products pipeline failed in Cook County, Illinois. About 25 barrels of gasoline were spilled from the pipeline. A crack in the pipe had developed at a dent. There was no fire or injuries reported.
- July 16 – A 12 3/4-inch pipeline burst in Barnes County, North Dakota, releasing 9,000 barrels of propane, which ignited. There were no casualties. During repairs, mechanical damage was seen on two nearby sections of this pipeline.
- July 30 – A Kinder Morgan pipeline in Tucson, Arizona, ruptured and sprayed 16,548 gallons of gasoline on five houses under construction, flooding nearby streets with gasoline. The resulting pipeline closure caused major gas shortages and price increases in the state. The failure at first was thought to be from LF ERW flaws, but tests showed it was due to stress corrosion cracking. A hydrostatic test that was performed on this pipeline after repairs failed again 40 feet (12 m) from the first failure.
- August 8 – A 26-inch Kinder Morgan and Myria Holdings Natural Gas Pipeline Company of America transmission pipeline ruptured in Caddo County, Oklahoma, releasing about 84,000 MCF of natural gas. A 54-foot long section of 26-inch diameter pipe had blown out and landed 30 feet from the ditch. Evacuations took place within 3/4 of a mile from the release, but there was no fire or casualties. Stress corrosion cracking was identified as the pipe failure's cause. The 26-inch diameter pipe was manufactured in 1956.
- September 26 – A propane pipeline at the Phillips Petroleum storage facility in Cahokia, Illinois, ruptured, sending flames high into the air and sparking small grass fires in the area.
- October 6 – A 12-inch petroleum products pipeline ruptured in Johnson County, Kansas, spilling about 100 to 200 barrels of diesel fuel. Some of the fuel contaminated a nearby waterway. There were no injuries.
- October 13 – A failure on an Enbridge pipeline near Bay City, Michigan spilled 500 barrels of crude oil.
- October 14 – A leak on what was originally the Big Inch 24-inch diameter natural gas transmission pipeline occurred in Orange County, Indiana. There were no injuries or evacuations. The longitudinal crack was attributed to external corrosion; the pipe had been installed in 1943.
- November 2 – A Texas Eastern Transmission Pipeline natural gas pipeline exploded, in Bath County, Kentucky, about 1.5 km south of a Duke Energy pumping station. A fire burned for about an hour before firefighters extinguished it. No one was injured and no property damage was reported. Investigators found that the pipe, manufactured in 1957, had two separate manufacturing defects.
- November 9 – An 8-inch Buckeye Partners pipeline failed near Mazon, Illinois. While repairs were being tested on this pipeline on November 14, another section of this pipeline failed about 1500 feet from the first leak. About ten barrels of gasoline and diesel fuel were spilled by the two leaks, requiring soil removal. External corrosion caused both failures. There were no injuries.
- December 13 – Another section of the same Williams Companies gas transmission pipeline that failed on May 1, 2003 failed in Lewis County, Washington. There was no fire this time. Gas flowed for three hours before being shut off. Gas pressure had already been reduced 20% on this pipeline after the May 1 explosion. External corrosion and stress corrosion cracking were seen in this 26-inch diameter pipe, which had been manufactured in 1956.

=== 2004 ===
- January 25 – A TEPPCO 8-inch propane pipeline failed, near Davenport, New York. The propane ignited, destroying a trailer house, and forcing evacuations. About 5,000 barrels of propane were burned. There were no injuries. The incident resulted from a through-wall failure of the pipe material at a fitting that was attached to the top of the pipe.
- February 16 – A Sunoco pipeline split at a defective weld, spilling about 38,000 gallons of crude oil, in Memphis, Texas. There were no injuries.
- March 12 – A TEPPCO pipeline spilled about 500 barrels of unleaded gasoline spilled into Moro Creek, which flows into the Sabine River near Kingsland, Arkansas. The cause was corrosion of a 1/2-inch bleeder line, that was part of a 20-inch pipeline block valve used to equalize pressure across the valve.
- April 28 – A 14-inch diameter petroleum pipeline of Kinder Morgan Energy Partners ruptured, and spilled an estimated 103,000 gallons of diesel fuel into marshes, adjacent to Suisun Bay, in Northern California. The line failed from external corrosion. The company failed to notify California authorities about the spill for 18 hours, a failure for which it was later cited. Kinder Morgan was fined $5.3 million for the spill, and agreed to enhance spill prevention, response and reporting practices.
- May 23 – A leak in a sampling tube on a pipeline in Renton, Washington spilled several thousand gallons of gasoline, which ignited.
- May 26 – A Kinder Morgan pipeline at Pasadena, Texas, had a “significant event” due to a weld failure.
- July 20 – An exploding manhole struck and severely injured an automobile passenger, most likely due to leaking gas. https://archive.boston.com/news/local/articles/2004/07/21/manhole_cover_explodes_hurting_motorist/
- August 19
  - A Sunoco pipeline ruptured, in Truscott, Texas, spilling about 21,000 gallons of crude oil. 27,000 cubic yards of contaminated soil were removed as part of the clean up. The failure was caused by a material defect in the pipe.
  - A series of explosions hit an underground natural gas storage cavern in Moss Bluff, Texas, resulting in evacuations for a 3-mile radius. The first blast, about 4 a.m., sent flames 150 to 200 feet into the air. The second explosion was seen as far as 20 miles away. Equipment failure was suspected. The cavern had just been expanded using the SMUG (solution mining under gas) process, which permits salt cavern expansion without interrupting gas storage operations. There were no injuries reported.
- August 21 – A natural gas explosion destroyed a home in DuBois, Pennsylvania, killing the two residents and doing $800,000 in property damage. After the accident, the National Fuel Gas Distribution Corporation (National Fuel) probed the ground near the residence for gas leaks and found combustible readings in one area adjacent to the house, and in another area directly over the failed pipe on the front lawn. National Fuel began excavating the lawn and uncovered a leaking butt-fusion joint in a 2-inch-diameter plastic gas pipe. NTSB investigators concluded that the probable cause of the leak, explosion, and fire was the fracture of the defective joint.
- September 26 – Vandals started up a trackhoe at a construction site in New Caney, Texas, and dug into a propylene pipeline. The escaping propylene ignited, causing nearby residents to evacuate. There were no injuries reported. 2 men were later arrested for this incident.
- September 27 – Near Blair, Nebraska, an ammonia pipeline failed, releasing 193,213 pounds of ammonia, resulting in the hospitalization of one individual and emergency responders evacuated houses within a one-mile circumference of the break. An estimated 1,000 fish were killed along North Creek and in a golf course pond.
- September 28 – A pipeline failed in Hughes County, Oklahoma, spilling an estimated 1,500 barrels (240 m^{3}) of diesel fuel.
- In October, after Hurricane Ivan damaged a crude oil pipeline off the Louisiana Coast, crews from Shell Oil Company recovered 100,000 of an oil seawater mix.
- October 27 – An anhydrous ammonia pipeline ruptured near Kingman, Kansas, and released approximately 4,858 barrels (772.4 m^{3}) of anhydrous ammonia. Nobody was killed or injured due to the release. The anhydrous ammonia leak killed more than 20,000 fish along a 12.5-mile section of Smoots Creek, including some from threatened species. The pipeline had previous damage to it. The pipeline controller had misinterpreted the leak as other problems with the system operation, causing the leak to go on longer. As a result of this, and another ammonia pipeline leak the month before, the pipeline owner and its two operating companies were later fined $3.65 million.
- November 1 – A construction crew ruptured a high-pressure gas line in Little Rock, Arkansas, near one of the state's busiest intersections Monday, triggering a fire that melted traffic lights overhead. No one was injured.
- November 8 – A NGL pipeline failed in a housing division in Ivel, Kentucky. The vapor cloud from the leak ignited, seriously burning a Kentucky State Trooper evacuating those living in the area. Eight others were injured and five houses were destroyed. The pipeline, only 65 miles (105 km) long, had 11 previous corrosion failures. Installed in the 1950s, the ruptured 4-inch steel transmission line belonged to Kentucky-West Virginia Gas Co., a division of Equitable Gas in Pittsburgh, but was operated by Colorado-based Mark West Hydrocarbon. Investigators found external corrosion and a small hole in the pipeline.
- November 9 – In Walnut Creek, California, a petroleum pipeline carrying gasoline to San Jose, California, owned and operated by Kinder Morgan Energy Partners (KMEP) was struck by a backhoe used by Mountain Cascade, Inc., a contractor operating in the construction of a water pipeline for the East Bay Municipal Utility District (EBMUD). A large gasoline spill was subsequently ignited, resulting in an explosive fireball that incinerated five workers, severely injuring four others. A Kinder Morgan worker had misread an as-built map, and had incorrectly marked the pipeline's route before the accident. CalOSHA (California Occupational Safety and Health Administration) cited Kinder Morgan for failure to accurately mark or map the pipeline location. In 2005, the California Fire Marshal fined Kinder Morgan $500,000 for its role in this “completely preventable” disaster. In 2007, Kinder Morgan was convicted on six felony charges related to the Walnut Creek explosion and was fined $15 million.
- November 21 – A 14-inch petroleum products pipeline sprung a leak while it was shipping gasoline in the Mojave Desert. The Calnev Pipeline, owned and operated by the California-Nevada Pipeline Company, a subsidiary of Kinder-Morgan Energy Partners, is the main source of petroleum fuel products for the Las Vegas Valley, Nevada. An 80-foot (24 m) geyser of gasoline was discovered on the next morning, after numerous complaints of a strong gasoline odor along Interstate 15 in northern San Bernardino County, CA.
- December 15 – Employees were performing maintenance on a propane pipeline near Mantador, North Dakota, when a gasket on the pipeline's valve failed, causing a leak. Nearby residents were evacuated, and a rail line was shut down temporarily. There were no injuries.
- December 20 – The Kinder Morgan Tejas pipeline at Pasadena, Texas, had a “significant event” due to a weld failure that caused control/relief equipment to fail.
- December 24 – As much as 5,000 gallons of crude oil spilled from a ConocoPhillips pipeline south of Laurel, Montana near the Yellowstone River. Hydrogen sulfide gas from the oil could have posed a major danger, but "the wind helped immensely" to dissipate the gas.

=== 2005 ===
- January – A Mid-Valley owned and Sunoco operated pipeline ruptured, spilling 260,000 US gallons (980,000 L) of oil into the Kentucky and Ohio rivers. The U.S. Environmental Protection Agency fined the companies $2.5 million for the spill.
- January 18 – An Enbridge pipeline failed from temperature problems, causing a spill of 100 barrels of crude oil in Bay City, Michigan. The pipe was just two years old at the time.
- January 26 – A Mid Valley 22-inch pipeline ruptured in Carrollton, Kentucky, spilling about 290,000 gallons of crude oil. Some of the crude entered the Ohio River. The pipe failure was caused by earth movement.
- February 1 – An ExxonMobil gasoline pipeline fire forced 43 families from their houses near Allentown, Pennsylvania. The fire burned for over 72 hours. There were no reported injuries.
- Around February 28 – Approximately 2,497 barrels of Jet A Kerosene discharged from a 14-inch TEPPCO pipeline, reaching the Big Cow Creek, flowing into the Sabine River, near Newton, Texas. The discharge was caused by the over-tightening of a coupling at a 3/8-inch cooling line at the top of a 14-inch mainline pump.
- March 15 – The Kinder Morgan Tejas pipeline at Nacogdoches, Texas, had a “significant event” due to incorrect operation.
- March 16 – A crew installing a communications cable nicked a gas distribution pipeline in Moon Township, Pennsylvania. The crew then notified the local One Call center, but failed to alert first responders. two hours after the nick, gas exploded in a house, burning two teenagers there.
- April 1 – A Kinder Morgan Energy Partners petroleum products pipeline leaked gasoline near Truckee, California. Gasoline spread into Summit Creek, then, into Donner Lake. About 300 gallons spilled. The cause of the leakage was stress corrosion cracking.
- May 4 – A petroleum products pipeline failed near El Dorado, Kansas, spilling about 78,000 gallons of diesel fuel, of which about 46,000 gallons were lost. The pipeline failed from external corrosion.
- May 13 – An underground natural gas pipeline exploded near Marshall, Texas, sending a giant fireball into the sky and hurling a 160-foot (49 m) section of pipe onto the grounds of a nearby electric power generating plant. Two people were hurt. The OPS concluded that stress corrosion cracking was the culprit.
- May 13 – The 30-inch Seaway Pipeline, operated by TEPPCO at the time, failed in Bryan County, Oklahoma, spilling approximately 898 barrels of crude oil. Oil reached Eastman Creek. The discharge was caused by a 6-inch longitudinal seam split on the pipeline that resulted from a stress crack that may have been induced by conditions occurring during rail transport of the pipe, and enlarged by pressure-cycle-induced stresses over years of operation of the pipeline.
- May 23 – A Magellan Pipeline petroleum products pipeline broke near Kansas City, Kansas, spilling gasoline into the nearby Missouri River. About 2,936 barrels of gasoline were spilled, with about 2,400 barrels being lost.
- May 28 – A 12-inch (300 mm) Kinder Morgan Energy Partners pipeline ruptured in El Paso, Texas, releasing gasoline.
- June 7 – During replacement of an Enterprise Products pipeline pigging facility in Mirando City, Texas, HVL gases leaked past a stopple. The gases were ignited by a nearby air compressor, killing one of the repair crew.
- August 11 – A bulldozer hit a Sunoco crude oil pipeline, north of Lufkin, Texas. The escaping crude ignited, injuring the bulldozer operator. About 18,500 gallons of crude oil were lost.
- August 18 – A leak was detected in an insulating flange along the BP Amoco Whiting to River Rouge pipeline at a monitoring well in Granger, Indiana. Initially, the bolts and nuts were replaced around the flange to mitigate any leaks; on August 25, when supply concerns diminished, the insulating flange was cut out and replaced with a straight section of pipe. Approximately 21 gallons of gasoline were removed from the ground, with no injuries or fatalities. Metallurgical analysis revealed that the fiber ring joint gasket had evidence of a prior leak.
- August 29 – Hurricane Katrina caused a protective levee to fail near Nairn, Louisiana in Plaquemines Parish, Louisiana, causing a Shell 20-inch pipeline to rupture. About 13,400 gallons were spilled, with about 10,500 gallons of this spill reaching the shoreline, and coastal marshes.
- August – Hurricane Katrina damaged numerous offshore pipelines, in the Gulf of Mexico region.
- September 18 – A pipeline pumping station employee was killed in Monroe, Ohio, when leaking propane was ignited by an arcing pump, causing an explosion. Flames reached 300 feet (91 m) high in the following fire.
- October 25 – A Kinder Morgan pipeline at Texas City, Texas, had a weld failure that caused control/relief equipment to malfunction.
- November 9 – A house explosion in Lexington, MA injured two, destroyed a home and led to evacuation of 1800 homes. The cause was an accidental over pressurization of a gas main.
- November 23 – At the Sunoco Darby Creek Tank Farm in Sharon Hill, Pennsylvania, a major crude oil spill occurred from misoperation of tank valves. About 436,000 gallons of crude were spilled, with most of that recovered.
- December 6 – A natural gas compressor station exploded near Rifle, Colorado, about 200 yards from Interstate 70. There was only one minor injury to a nearby truck driver.
- December 13 – Workers removing an underground oil tank in Bergenfield, New Jersey undermined a 1 1/4-inch steel gas pipeline. The gas line later failed, causing an explosion. Three residents of a nearby apartment building were killed. Four other residents and a tank removal worker were injured. Failure to evacuate the apartment building after the gas line ruptured was listed as a contributing factor.
- December 25 – A Sunoco 16 inch crude oil pipeline was discovered to be leaking by a landowner, in Cisco, Texas. About 47,500 gallons of crude were spilled, with only about 4,200 gallons recovered. About 2,500 cubic yards of soil were removed in the clean up. The cause was internal corrosion.

=== 2006 ===
- January 13 – A pipeline leak near Independence, Kansas, spilled about 135,000 gallons of petroleum product, of which about 93,000 gallons was lost. The pipeline failed from external corrosion.
- February 28 – A gas compressor station explosion severely burned a worker, and set off a raging fire near De Beque, Colorado. A second explosion at that site soon after caused no injuries.
- March 2 – Prudhoe Bay oil spill: A surveillance crew discovered a crude oil spill from a BP crude pipeline near North Slope Borough, Alaska. The pipeline failure resulted in a release currently estimated at 5,000 barrels (790 m^{3}) of processed crude oil, impacting the arctic tundra and covering approximately 2 acres (8,100 m^{2}) of permafrost. The pipeline's leak detection system was not effective in recognizing and identifying the failure. Failure to run cleaning pigs to remove internal corrosive build up was a factor. The failure caused crude oil prices to spike throughout the World.
- March 23 – A pipeline failed west of Toledo, Ohio, spilling about 200 barrels (32 m^{3}) of unleaded gasoline. During the repair work, another smaller nearby leak was also found.
- April 17 – A Plantation Pipeline line experienced a failure in Henrico County, near Richmond, Virginia. The failure resulted in the release of 23,226 gallons of jet fuel in a residential area. The jet fuel sprayed for approximately 14 minutes and the spray traveled the distance of approximately 200 feet (61 m). The jet fuel did not ignite.
- June 19 – A 12 inch Sunoco pipeline failed at a tank farm, in Tye, Texas, spilling about 21,000 gallons of crude oil. The cause was internal corrosion.
- June 27 – A Koch Industries pipeline carrying crude oil failed, near the town of Little Falls, Minnesota. The pipeline operator estimated that approximately 3,200 barrels (510 m^{3}) of crude oil were released. The pipeline failed due to previous mechanical damage to it.
- July 22
  - A Tennessee Gas Pipeline Company gas transmission pipeline ruptured, resulting in an estimated release of 42,946,000 ft^{3} (1,216,100 m^{3}) of natural gas near Clay City in Clark County, Kentucky. The gas ignited, but there were no injuries, and just minor property damage. External corrosion was suspected.
  - Near Campbellsville, Kentucky, a Kinder Morgan Tennessee Gas Pipeline exploded. A 25-foot-long piece of pipe blew out of the ground and landed 200 feet away; the pipe wad twisted and mangled, its external coating burned off. The 24" pipeline ruptured due to an area of external bacterial corrosion more than two feet long at the bottom of a valley in an area of wet shale, known to cause corrosion on buried pipelines in this part of Kentucky. The pipe was manufactured in 1944.
- August 7 – A leak from a pump on a pipeline, released about 241,000 gallons of HVLs, in Jennings, Louisiana.
- August 12 – A Kinder Morgan petroleum pipeline failed in Romeoville, Illinois. About 59,000 US gallons (220,000 L) of butane were lost. External corrosion was the cause, but there were no injuries.
- September 8 – A leak on a pump on an LPG pipeline in Apex, North Carolina, spilled about 12,000 gallons of propane, forcing evacuations.
- September 29 – A crew replacing an old pipeline hit a high-pressure gas pipeline in Labette County, Kansas, killing a crewman. Residents within a mile of the incident were evacuated for a time.
- October 12 – A pipeline exploded when a tugboat pushing two barges hit that pipeline in West Cote Blanche Bay, about two miles (3 km) from shore and 100 miles (160 km) southwest of New Orleans, Louisiana. Four crew members were killed, and two were missing and later presumed dead.
- October 25 – An ammonia pipeline failed from corrosion near Clay Center, Kansas, releasing about 4500 barrels of ammonia. Two people were injured by the fumes.
- November 11 – Near Cheyenne, Wyoming, a jet-black, 300-acre (1.2 km^{2}) burn site surrounded the skeletal hulk of a bulldozer that struck the Rockies Express (REX) natural-gas pipeline, setting off an explosion and fire. The bulldozer operator was killed. The subcontractor did not know there was another pipeline there because no one had marked the position of the existing pipeline. The company building the new pipeline was fined $2.3 million for failing to obtain a location for the other pipeline. Two months after this explosion, the Federal Energy Regulatory Commission threatened to shut the project down if REX didn’t improve its “poor compliance record” involving construction activity outside the approved work area.
- Around November 27 – Approximately 97 barrels of gasoline were discharged from a portion of Plantation Pipeline in Mecklenburg County, North Carolina, into Paw Creek and its adjoining shorelines. The leak resulted from a failed gasket on an above-ground block valve.
- December 6 – 2006 Falk Corporation explosion: Leaks in a Milwaukee, Wisconsin, propane pipe running below an apartment building caused an explosion. Three people were killed and forty-seven others injured.
- December 19 – A lineman for Midwest Energy hit a natural gas transmission pipeline near Mason, Michigan. The lineman was killed in the following explosion and fire.
- December 24 – A Plains All American Pipeline ruptured, spilling about 23,856 gallons of crude oil in the Gulf of Mexico, about 30 miles southeast of Galveston, Texas.

=== 2007 ===
- January 1 – An Enbridge pipeline that runs from Superior, Wisconsin to near Whitewater, Wisconsin failed, resulting in a spill of 1,500 barrels of crude oil onto farmland and into a drainage ditch. Incomplete fusion of a longitudinal weld at the pipe maker that failed as pressure cycled was established as the cause.
- February 2 – A construction crew struck an Enbridge pipeline in Rusk County, Wisconsin with equipment, spilling 4,800 barrels (760 m^{3}) of crude oil, of which only 2,066 barrels were recovered. Some of the oil filled a hole more than 20 feet (6.1 m) deep and was reported to have contaminated the local water table.
- February 6 - A cable installation company hit a gas distribution pipeline, in Saratoga Springs, Utah, causing a leak. Later, after being given an all clear, a gas company employee entered a nearby home to relight a furnace pilot light. A gas buildup in the home exploded, killing the gas company employee and a homeowner.
- February 17 – In a rural area of Harris County, Texas, a Tennessee Gas Pipeline transmission pipeline was damaged, and later exploded and burned. Grass fires spread across a three-square mile rural area. The 31-inch natural gas pipeline leaked after a bulldozer hit it. Residents reported a loud explosion that shook houses enough to set off car alarms, as well as a rumbling sound and a bright orange fireball in the sky. Firefighters "backfilled" the break with nitrogen. PHMSA reported 1 person injured.
- March 12 – New pipeline construction equipment hit an existing natural gas transmission pipeline near Lake Weatherford, in Parker County, Texas. A massive fire followed, but there were no injuries.
- March 29 – Near Yutan, Nebraska, a pipeline was hit by construction equipment. About 1,697 barrels of natural gasoline were lost.
- April 27 – A 22 inches (560 mm) gas transmission pipeline failed near Pawnee, Illinois. The failure ejected a 109 inches (2.8 m) long section of pipe, and released 38 million ft^{3} (1.1 million m^{3}) of natural gas that ignited. The rupture and resulting fire resulted in the evacuation of a residence and the death of farm animals. The failure was due to external corrosion.
- May 4 – A backhoe helping to lay a gas pipeline hit another gas pipeline in Weatherford, Texas. The gas ignited, sending flames hundreds of feet into the air. Vehicles, equipment, and power lines in the area were destroyed, but there were no injuries.
- May 16 – About 63,000 US gallons (240,000 L) of gasoline spilled into an old stripping pit that covers a three-acre area in Coal Township, Pennsylvania. The Kerris and Helfrick company owns the property where the gas leak occurred, and the excavator, was working for the company when he accidentally ruptured the Sunoco Logistics 14-inch petroleum pipeline. The gasoline was mostly absorbed into areas of soil, fill and coal strippings at the site. The pipeline was installed in 1964 by the Atlantic Richfield Co.(ARCO) and purchased in 1990 by Sunoco. On September 29, the PADEP Environmental Cleanup program finalized a consent order and agreement with Mallard Contracting, which included a $45,000 civil penalty covering both DEP's response costs and a fine for violations of the Pa. Solid Waste Management Act.
- August – A gas compressor turbine caught fire inside BP's Gathering Center 1 in Alaska, after an oil hose ruptured and spewed flammable liquid across the motor. A mechanic on patrol in the facility — seeing smoke — fled the room as the turbine burst into flames. Automatic fire and gas alarms were never triggered. A subsequent investigation by Alaska state authorities found that a ruptured hydraulic oil hose was Jerry-rigged in a position that chafed against the turbine's hot engine. The investigation also found that the facility's fire and gas detectors were not powered on at the time.
- October 8 – A gas pipeline at a gas storage facility in Salem, Michigan ruptured and caught fire. Siding was melted on nearby houses.
- October 18 – An ethylene pipeline explosion early, was heard for miles around Port Arthur, Texas, waking residents. The following fire spread to a nearby butadiene pipeline, causing it to rupture and burn. Later, over 300 residents sued the pipeline's owners for health issues claimed to be caused from the chemicals released by the accident. External corrosion of the ethylene pipeline caused the first pipeline failure.
- November 1 – A 12-inch propane pipeline of Dixie Pipeline exploded, killing two people, injuring five others, and damaged homes, near Carmichael in the southeast portion of Clarke County, Mississippi. The NTSB determined the probable cause was an LF-ERW seam failure. During hydrostatic testing of the pipeline after repair, another LF-ERW seam failed nearby. Inadequate education of residents near the pipeline about the existence of this pipeline, and how to respond to a pipeline accident, were also cited as a factors in the deaths.
- November 12 – Three teenaged boys drilled into an ammonia pipeline, in Tampa Bay, Florida, causing a major ammonia leak. They later claimed they did it due to stories of money being hidden inside that pipeline. The leak took two days to be capped. One of the teens had serious chemical burns from the ammonia. Residents within a half mile from the leak were evacuated. PHMSA later noted the pipeline company failed to adequately plan for emergencies with the local Fire Agency, as required by CFR 195.402(c)(12).
- November 13 – Enbridge discovered a leak on their 34-inch Line 3, at Mile Post 912, near Clearbrook, Minnesota. Later, the pipeline exploded during repairs, on November 27, causing the deaths of two employees. DOT officials said that two Enbridge workers died in a crude oil explosion as they worked to make repairs on the former Lakehead system pipeline. Enbridge was cited for failing to safely and adequately perform maintenance and repair activities, clear the designated work area from possible sources of ignition, and hire properly trained and qualified workers.
- November 21 – A 30-inch gas transmission pipeline failed, near Haven, Kansas. The gas ignited, resulting in road closures.
- December 14 – Two men were driving east in a pickup truck, on Interstate 20 near Delhi, Louisiana, when a 30-inch gas transmission pipeline exploded. One of the men were killed, and the other injured. External corrosion was later identified as the cause of the failure.

=== 2008 ===
- January 5 – A pipeline ruptured at a filet weld, leaking natural gasoline in Oologah, Oklahoma. About 45,000 gallons of the gasoline were spilled, with about 29,000 gallons being lost.
- January 7 – A pipeline split open near Denver City, Texas, spilling 1.3 million US gallons (4,900 m^{3}) of crude oil. The pipeline company failed to detect and stop the leak for more than 24 hours. ERW seam failure appeared to be the cause.
- January 11 – A Belle Fourche maintenance crew damaged its own pipeline, spilling about 11,100 gallons of crude in Alexander, North Dakota.
- February 5 – A natural gas pipeline compressor station exploded and caught fire near Hartsville, Tennessee, and was believed to have been caused by a tornado hitting the facility.
- February 15 – A 20-inch distillate pipeline exploded and burned in Hidalgo County, Texas, closing road FM490.
- March 14 – A house in a Columbia, Missouri neighborhood exploded in an explosion that could be felt for miles, causing fatal injuries to the elderly couple living there. Problems with the gas distribution line there were blamed for the explosion. Another house nearby also suffered damage.
- May 16 – A crew boring to install a new gas main hit an existing 4-inch gas line in McKinney, Texas. Escaping gas caused two houses to explode, and one other house to catch fire. Three people were burned from this incident.
- July 28 – The U.S. District Court for the Southern District of Illinois ordered Apex Oil Company Inc. to clean up ground water and soil contamination, at an expected cost of at least $150 million. During the period 1967 through 1988, Apex Oil's legal predecessor, Clark Oil and Refining Corp., released gasoline from leaking pipelines and other spills that commingled with other responsible parties' releases and resulted in a large plume of refined petroleum substances beneath Hartford, Illinois. Vapors from the underground plume of millions of gallons of leaked and spilled petroleum products had migrated into houses in the village, causing years of fires, explosions, and evacuations.
- August 10 – A 20-inch crude oil pipeline ruptured near Golden Gate, Illinois. About 243,000 gallons of crude were spilled, with about 33,000 gallons being lost. The cause was listed as a pipe seam failure.
- August 25 – A 24-inch gas transmission pipeline failed in a rural area west of Pilot Grove, Missouri. The longitudinal rupture in the pipe body created a 50 foot by 33-foot by 7-foot deep crater in the ground. The cause of the rupture was external corrosion.
- August 28 – A 36-inch gas pipeline failed near Stairtown, Texas, causing a fire with flames 400 feet (120 m) tall. The failure was caused by external corrosion.
- August 29 – A 24-inch gas transmission pipeline ruptured in Cooper County, Missouri. Corrosion had caused the pipeline to lose 75% of its wall thickness in the failure area.
- September 9 – Workers constructing a new pipeline hit an existing natural gas pipeline in Wheeler County, Texas. Two workers were burned by this accident.
- September 14 – A 30-inch Williams Companies gas pipeline ruptured and gas ignited near Appomattox, Virginia. Two houses were destroyed by the fire. External corrosion was the cause of the failure.
- September 23 – A ruptured pipeline caused a fire at a Pipeline Terminal in Pasadena, Texas. One worker was killed, and another injured, with about 190,000 US gallons (720,000 L) of product being lost. The failure was caused by internal corrosion.
- October 3
  - A crew working on a Turnpike expansion drilled into a Colonial Pipeline petroleum products pipeline in Hamilton, New Jersey. About 35,000 gallons of diesel fuel were spilled, with 100 gallons not recovered.
  - Construction equipment hit a Mid Valley Pipeline Company pipeline in Florence, Kentucky, spilling about 153,000 gallons of crude oil.
- November 15 – That night, a gas compressor for a pipeline at an entry exploded and burned near Godley, Texas. The fire spread to another company's gas compressor station next to it. A 24-inch gas pipeline had to be shut down to stop the fire. There were no injuries, and damages were estimated at $2 million.
- November 25 – A gasoline release from a Sunoco petroleum pipeline occurred near a retail mall in Murrysville, Pennsylvania. Officials said the release occurred from the 6-inch line at about 9:30 a.m. while a Sunoco Logistics crew was working on a ball valve. It was suspected the ball valve was improperly installed. The failure resulted in the evacuation of numerous stores, restaurants, and roads in the immediate vicinity due to the dousing of gasoline and subsequent vapors emitting from the 11,760 US gallons (44,500 L) of spilled product.
- December 5 – A driver of a vehicle went off of a road and struck a valve on an Amoco gasoline pipeline in Colon, Michigan. The driver was killed, and the fire burned for several days. About 14,000 gallons of gasoline were burned, or lost.

=== 2009 ===
- January 4 – A 6.625-inch storage well line operated by Columbia Gas Transmission Company in Elk View (near Charleston), Kanawha County, West Virginia, ruptured due to internal corrosion pitting, complicated by low impact toughness of the pipe material, causing $29,011 in damage.
- January 15 – An accidental massive gas release at Pump Station 1 of the trans-Alaskan pipeline by Alyeska Pipeline Service Company threatened the site at the time. The company that runs the pipeline acknowledges a fire or explosion, had the gas ignited, could have imperiled the station's 60-plus workers and caused "an extended shutdown" of oil fields. There was no ignition or explosion. The incident occurred as BP workers used a cleaning device called a pig to swab oil out of an old pipeline the company was preparing to decommission. The 34-inch pipe was among major Prudhoe trunk lines found in 2006 to be ravaged with corrosion, due to BP's admitted lack of proper maintenance. A large volume of gas then bypassed the pig somehow, and rushed to Pump Station 1, a key asset through which every drop of oil coming off the North Slope must pass.
- February 11 – A gas pipeline exploded and burned near a natural gas treatment plant, near Carthage, Texas. There were no injuries.
- February 18 – At approximately 5 p.m., a rupture of pipeline near the pump station and terminal located in Cygnet, Ohio, owned by Philadelphia-based Sunoco, resulted in one of the largest oil spills in Wood County history. Upon learning of the release, the company immediately shut down the pipeline, stopped operations at the pump station and terminal, notified the appropriate authorities, and began an emergency response. As of 11:05 a.m. ET on February 19, the release had been stopped from the pipe. The damaged pipeline, which was operating at the time, released crude oil into a farm field. Eventually, about 19,000 gallons of the 52,500 gallons released were recovered. Some of the crude oil did contaminate a local creek. There were no fatalities, or injuries.
- February 19 – Leaking gas was detected near homes, in Somerset, Massachusetts. Evacuations followed, but one resident who did not respond to knocking on doors was killed, when the gas exploded. Prior excavation damage to a gas main was the cause.
- March 16 - At a Sunoco control center, a pipeline flow imbalance was detected, due to a leak in their 12 crude oil near Lorena, Texas. About 59,000 gallons of crude oil were spilled. The cause was internal corrosion.
- May 4 – Kinder Morgan's Florida Gas Transmission pipeline burst near Palm City and Hobe City, Florida (near Port Salerno, Florida). The explosion ejected 106 feet of buried pipe weighing about 5,000 pounds out of the ground and onto the right-of-way between Interstate 95 and the Florida Turnpike (SR-91). The rupture was near a high school that was within the 366-foot potential impact radius. Two people were injured when their car ran off the road, and a Sheriff's deputy walked through a dense cloud and inhaled natural gas. The escaping gas did not ignite. The pipe was manufactured in 1959. The leak caused $596,218 in property damage. FGT was cited for safety violations: failing to identify a high-consequence area, failing to test operators for alcohol and drugs, and failing to have prompt emergency response; PHMSA assessed a $95,000 fine.
- May 5 – A natural gas pipeline exploded and caught on fire, near Rockville, Indiana in Parke County, about 24 miles (39 km) north of Terre Haute, Indiana. The cause of this failure was determined to be external corrosion. Additional work performed as a result of this order provided significant indications of external corrosion in various sections of this line. Pictures have been released around the area showing the damage caused. 52 people were evacuated in a one-mile (1.6 km) area of the explosion. No injuries reported.
- May 21 – An Enbridge pipeline pig sending trap in Superior, Wisconsin leaked from operator error, spilling about 6500 gallons of crude oil. 700 cubic yards of contaminated soil had to be removed.
- July 15 – An explosion occurred at Kinder Morgan's Midcontinent Express pipeline natural gas metering station that was under construction, while it was being pressure tested with nitrogen, in Smith County, Mississippi. One worker was killed, and two others injured. There was no fire. The workers were "literally right on top" of the explosion; their injuries were caused by pressure, not heat. One worker was injured when part of the pipe fell on him. The explosion snapped and bent a pipeline connected to a massive separator unit which was slung several yards.
- August 10 – Operators of a Belle Fourche pipeline incorrectly operated the line, causing it to fail, near Edgerton, Wyoming. About 30,000 gallons of crude oil were spilled, with about 1,200 gallons being lost.
- August 17 – A pipeline was found leaking by an aerial patrol in Atoka County, Oklahoma. 50 barrels (7.9 m^{3}) of diesel fuel were estimated to have been released as a result of this accident, and none of it was recovered.
- August 24 - A 12 inch Sunoco crude oil pipeline leaked, in Mount Belvieu, Texas. About 105,000 gallons of crude oil were spilled, and the cause was due to internal corrosion.
- October 7 – A leaking pipeline carrying jet fuel was accidentally ignited by a pipeline repair crew in Upton County, Texas.
- October 28 – Kinder Morgan's Natural Gas Pipeline Company of America above-ground storage tank north of St. Elmo, Illinois caught fire, injuring two workers. Welding caused the tank to ignite resulting in several explosions. Two workers were taken to the hospital.
- November 5 – Two people were hurt when an El Paso Natural Gas pipeline exploded in the Texas Panhandle near Bushland, Texas. The explosion left a hole about 30 yards by 20 yards and close to 15 feet (4.6 m) deep. The orange inferno rose about 700 feet in the air; the blast incinerated the home of the Jose Torres family, injuring his wife Agnieszka and daughter Franczeska. About 200 residents in the area were evacuated. Bushland is in Potter County, about 15 miles (24 km) west of Amarillo. The failure was in an abandoned tap, but the exact failure reason remains unknown. The explosion cause $436,136 in property damage.
- November 14
  - A fire at a gas compressor station near Cameron, West Virginia slightly burned one employee, and caused $5.6 million of damage to the facility.
  - A newly built 42-inch gas transmission pipeline near Philo, Ohio failed on the second day of operation. There was no fire, but evacuations resulted. Several indications of pipe deformation were found.
- December 3–4 – A Minnesota Pipeline carrying crude oil leaked in Todd County, Minnesota, spilling about 5,000 barrels of crude. Pipeline workers on December 3 had been repairing sections of the 16-inch pipe in a rural area, left on the afternoon of December 3, and the spill occurred during the evening hours of December 3–4.
- December 23 – A crude oil pipeline started leaking in Galveston, Texas. There was no fire or explosion as a result of the accident, and an estimated 120 barrels (19 m^{3}) of crude oil were released to the environment.
