= List of pipeline accidents in the United States in the 1980s =

The following is a list of pipeline accidents in the United States in the 1980s. It is one of several lists of U.S. pipeline accidents. See also: list of natural gas and oil production accidents in the United States.

== Incidents ==
This is not a complete list of all pipeline accidents. For natural gas alone, the Pipeline and Hazardous Materials Safety Administration (PHMSA), a United States Department of Transportation agency, has collected data on more than 3,200 accidents deemed serious or significant since 1987.

A "significant incident" results in any of the following consequences:

- Fatality or injury requiring in-patient hospitalization.
- $50,000 or more in total costs, measured in 1984 dollars.
- Liquid releases of five or more barrels (42 US gal/barrel).
- Releases resulting in an unintentional fire or explosion.

PHMSA and the National Transportation Safety Board (NTSB) post-incident data and results of investigations into accidents involving pipelines that carry a variety of products, including natural gas, oil, diesel fuel, gasoline, kerosene, jet fuel, carbon dioxide, and other substances. Occasionally pipelines are re-purposed to carry different products.

=== 1980 ===
- January 2 – Crude oil leaked from a fractured 22-inch pipeline, at a levee crossing, in Berwick, Louisiana. At 9:54 a.m., the crude oil ignited. One person was killed, one person was injured, and six homes were either destroyed, or, damaged. The pipeline's monitoring system failed to detect a loss of over 1,800 barrels (290 m^{3}) of oil. A defective sleeve weld cause the pipeline to fail.
- January 30 – An 8-inch refined petroleum products pipeline, owned by The Pipelines of Puerto Rico, Inc., was struck and ruptured by a bulldozer, during maintenance work on a nearby waterline, in the Sector Cana of Bayamon, Puerto Rico, about 10 miles (16 km) southwest of San Juan. Gasoline from the rupture sprayed downhill, and ran off into a small creek. About 1 1/2 hours later, the gasoline vapors were ignited by an undetermined source and exploded; the subsequent fire killed one person and extensively damaged 25 houses and other property.
- February 21 – An explosion and fire destroyed four stores in a shopping complex and severely damaged an adjoining restaurant in Cordele, Georgia. Of the eight persons who were injured, three died later as a result of their injuries. Property damage was extensive. The NTSB investigation of the accident has revealed that natural gas leaked from a 1-inch steel service line, which had been pulled from a 1-inch compression coupling from a backhoe working in the area, and migrated under a concrete slab floor and into a jewelry store where it was ignited by an unknown source.
- March 6 – A Colonial Pipeline Dispatcher ignored established procedures for dealing with a pressure surge, causing a double rupture of a 32-inch steel petroleum products pipeline. One break, where the pipe had been thinned by corrosion in a casing under a road, caused the release of 8,000 barrels (1,300 m^{3}) of aviation-grade kerosene adjacent to route 234 near Manassas, Virginia. Before being fully contained, the kerosene had flowed into Bull Run River, and had entered the Occoquan Reservoir, a source of drinking water for several northern Virginia communities. The other break, where a crack in the pipe wall initiated during rail shipment of the pipe from the steel mill finally propagated to failure, caused the release of 2,190 barrels (348 m^{3}) of No. 2 fuel oil near Locust Grove, a rural area in Orange County, near Fredericksburg, Virginia. Before being fully contained, the fuel oil had flowed into the Rapidan River and then into the Rappahannock River, a source of drinking water for the City of Fredericksburg.
- March 7 – Sabotage during a labor strike was suspected in a gasoline pipeline explosion in Marcus Hook, Pennsylvania. The following fire burned for about 17 hours.
- April 16 – Gasoline at a Williams Companies pipeline terminal in Roseville, Minnesota, sprayed from the fractured cast-iron base of a station booster pump at 72 psig pressure, vaporized, and exploded after it was ignited by the spark of an electric switch in the mainline pump control room 50 feet (15 m) downwind of the booster pump. One man was killed, 3 others injured, and extensive damage was done to the terminal. About 3,500 barrels (560 m^{3}) of petroleum products burned and property damage was estimated at $3 million.
- May 27 – Near Cartwright, Louisiana, an anhydrous ammonia pipeline was struck by a bulldozer, which was being used to prepare a well site, and the pipeline ruptured. Over 100 people were evacuated from the area.
- July 23 – A Tennessee Gas Pipeline 30 inch line burst in Clay City, Kentucky, spraying dirt and rocks in the area, damaging 2 homes. There was no fire.
- August 11 – A road grader ruptured an NGL pipeline in Aurora, Colorado. Firefighters had barely evacuated residents in the area when the vapors exploded, burning one firefighter.
- September 3 – A Mid-Valley Pipeline Co. line was ruptured by pipeline work, in Cygnet, Ohio. Efforts to contain the crude were unable to prevent some of it from entering the Portage River.
- September 12 – An oil pipeline ruptured and burned while it was being repaired at an oil storage Terminal in Piney Point, Maryland. One worker was killed, and 5 others injured in the fire.
- October 9 – A 2-inch compression coupling located on the upstream side of a gas meter set assembly in the boiler room of the Simon Kenton High School in Independence, Kentucky, pulled out of its connection with a 2-inch gas service line. Natural gas at 165-psig pressure escaped through the 2-inch opening and, seconds later, exploded and burned. A basement wall was blown down, an adjacent classroom was damaged, and one student was killed. About 30 minutes later, a second explosion occurred, which injured 37 persons and extensively damaged the school. The gas main was being uprated at the time.
- October 20 - A gas transmission pipeline ruptured and burned, near Canadian, Texas, causing a fire that could be seen in 4 states.
- October 22 – A bulldozer digging a ditch for a new pipeline hit a 16-inch crude oil pipeline near San Ysidro, New Mexico. The operator was fatally burned.
- November 17 – a one-inch connector on a sour gas gathering pipeline broke near Malakoff, Texas. 12 families were evacuated for a time.
- December 1 – A pipeline carrying naphtha ruptured under a street in Long Beach, California, causing a fire that destroyed one home and damaged several others. Two people were injured. Lack of communication of pipeline valve setups, and pressure relief valves set to open at too high a pressure were identified by the NTSB as causes of the accident.
- December 4 – Installation of a new pipeline affected a propane pipeline, that then burst & ignited, near Spivey, Kansas. 4 workers had minor injuries.
- December 10 – A dirt pan machine being used for road construction hit a propane pipeline in Sumner, Georgia, causing slight injuries to the dirt pan operator. US Highway 82 and a rail line were closed, and several families evacuated until the vapors dispersed. There was no fire.
- December 22 – A pipeline carrying jet fuel ruptured in Las Vegas, Nevada, spilling fuel for 2 hours. Later, the fuel ignited, forcing road closures. One firefighter was overcome by fumes. Between 50,000 and 100,000 US gallons (380,000 L) of jet fuel were spilled. Prior construction in the area was suspected of damaging the pipeline.
- December 23 – A Southern California Edison pipeline ruptured in Carson, California on December 23, spilling about 105,000 gallons of crude oil, with some of it reaching the Dominguez Channel.
- December 28 – A natural gas pipeline exploded and burned at a gas plant in Ulysses, Kansas on December 28. There were no injuries

=== 1981 ===
- January 1 – A valve on the Trans-Alaska Pipeline System broke, releasing 42,000 gallons of crude oil 115 miles south of Prudhoe Bay, Alaska.
- January 5 – A gas transmission pipeline exploded and burned in Laingsburg, Michigan, causing a large fire. About a dozen homes nearby were evacuated. There were no injuries.
- February 13 – Construction workers severed an ethylene pipeline near Beaumont, Texas, which then exploded and burned. Three people were injured.
- April 7 – A 6-inch natural gas pipeline exploded, near Columbus City, Iowa. That failure caused a nearby 16 inch gas pipeline to explode and burn about 20 minutes later. The resulting fire could be seen for 35 miles. There was no injuries.
- April 16 – An explosion & fire in a gas feeder line to an underground gas storage facility in Columbus Junction, Iowa burned down a barn, and damaged other buildings. This was the second explosion at the facility in just over a week, and, the fifth explosion there in 6 years.
- July 11 – A pipeline carrying gasoline leaked in Maplewood, Minnesota. About 100,000 gallons of gasoline leaked.
- July 31 – An ammonia pipeline leaked near Hutchinson, Kansas, injuring 5 people, including 3 children at a Bible Camp. A 2-mile (3.2 km) radius from the leak was evacuated, including 90 from the Bible Camp.
- August 25 – In downtown San Francisco, California, a 16-inch natural gas main was punctured by a drill that an excavation contractor was using. Escaping natural gas blew upward and carried into the Embarcadero Complex and other nearby buildings. There was no ignition; however, the gas stream entrained an oil containing polychlorinated biphenyl (PCB). Fall-out affected an eight-square-block area of the city's financial district covering buildings, cars, trees, pedestrians, police, and firemen. Approximately 30,000 persons were safely evacuated from the area in 45 minutes. No one was killed or seriously injured, although many persons were sprayed with the PCB oil mist. There were delays in shutting down the gas, due to inaccurate diagrams.
- September 4 – A drilling rig, operated by a crew core-drilling for coal, near Belle, West Virginia, punctured a 12-inch gas transmission line. The pipeline was operating at a pressure of 600 psig. The rig operator was injured, the rig and a truck were destroyed, and an estimated volume of 3,433,000 cubic feet of gas was lost.
- September 15 – During routine maintenance, a pipeline exploded and burned between a gas plant and a petroleum plant in Goldsmith, Texas. While workers were fighting the fire, another part of the pipeline burst and burned. 6 workers were burned, and another had other injuries. There were a total of 7 fires from 7 pipeline ruptures.
- September 27 – A 12-inch diameter pipeline, near Ackerly, Texas, was hit by a rathole drill on September 27, releasing an ethane-propane mix. There was then an explosion & fire that killed 4 people.
- November 30 – At Flatwoods, West Virginia, gas leaking into a test section of a 26-inch gas transmission pipeline, ignited while a welder engaged in installing an end cap on the east end of a 180-foot (55 m)-long section of pipe. The resultant explosion blew off-the end cap, which struck and killed the welder's helper.
- December 5 – Hunters near Yutan, Nebraska tried out a new high power rifle by shooting what they thought was a log in a creek bed. The log was actually an LPG pipeline, and 12 to 16 families needed to be evacuated for their safety from the resulting vapor cloud. There was no fire.
- December 9 – A pipeline carrying gasoline ruptured near Joliet, Illinois, spilling 30,000 US gallons (110,000 L) of gasoline into the Des Plaines River.
- December 31 – A 20-inch gas pipeline in Ottawa, Kansas caused 2 explosions, and a raging fire, that destroyed 2 mobile homes. There were no injuries reported.

=== 1982 ===
- January 1 – A gas pipeline exploded and burned in Ottawa, Kansas, destroying 2 mobile homes. There were no injuries.
- January 28 – In Centralia, Missouri, natural gas at 47 psig entered a low pressure distribution system which normally operated at 0.40 psig after a backhoe bucket snagged, ruptured, and separated a 3/4-inch steel pressure regulator control line at a regulator station. The backhoe, owned and operated by the city of Centralia, was being used to clean a ditch located adjacent to the pressure regulator station. The high-pressure gas entering customer piping systems in some cases resulted in high pilot light flames which ignited fires in buildings; while in other cases, the pilot light flames were blown out, allowing gas to escape within the buildings. Of the 167 buildings affected by the overpressure, 12 were destroyed and 32 had moderate to heavy damages. Five persons received minor injuries.
- March 19 – A leaking 3 inch Amoco pipeline was discovered in a park in Salt Lake City, Utah. 1,500 square feet of sod near a soccer field was contaminated by oil, and had to be disposed of as toxic waste.
- April 16 – A Mobil LPG pipeline was ruptured by road construction in North Richland Hills, Texas. 800 to 1,000 nearby residents were evacuated. There was no fire. The construction crew workers said the pipeline was 5 feet (1.5 m) away from where it was shown on a map they were using.
- A backhoe ruptured a 2-inch gas pipeline in three places in Tacoma, Washington, causing evacuations. There was no fire or explosion.
- May 14 – A bulldozer hit a gas pipeline while digging a reserve pit for an oil well near Rush Springs, Oklahoma, causing a gas fire that injured 9 workers.
- May 18 – Sunoco pipeline crews were digging to find their 12-inch pipeline, when they hit it, causing a rupture, and spilling gasoline east of Gettysburg, Pennsylvania. Over 20,000 gallons of gasoline were spilled.
- June 15 – A bulldozer hit a Colonial Pipeline 12-inch petroleum products pipeline in Albany, Georgia, spraying the area with fuel oil, which then ignited, resulting in burns that later killed the bulldozer operator. The land surveyor hired to survey the land prior to the bulldozer work was performed in accordance with all local, state and federal requirements. All utility companies were called in to locate their lines, pipes, utilities. ALL land surveying was appropriately marked and completed prior to any land excavation work performed by the bulldozer. The pipeline was not registered on any of the county's land plot records. The pipeline was not buried the minimum requirement of 2.5 ft underground and should have been buried 4 ft underground.
- June 28 – A natural gas explosion demolished a house, killed five persons, and critically injured one person in Portales, New Mexico; the critically injured person died later at a burn treatment center. The gas service line to the house had been damaged 37 days earlier when a contractor's backhoe pulled up the line during conduit excavation work for the local telephone company.
- July 27 – An explosion & fire occurred at a Koch Industries propane pipeline pumping station, near Harper, Kansas. Power was knocked out in the area for a time.
- July 28 – A Tennessee Gas Pipeline was struck by a crew working on that pipeline in Prichard, West Virginia on July 28. Nine people were burned, including a family of 4 who were standing nearby. In addition, 200 feet of a nearby road was burned.
- August 15 – A Colonial Pipeline stub line failed in Floyd County, Georgia, spilling over 16,000 gallons of gasoline in the area of a subdivision. 15 families were evacuated for a time. There were no injuries.
- September 7 – Natural gas at 15 psig escaping from the open ends of a 2 1/4-inch cast-iron gas main located in a deep, narrow excavation in Dublin, Georgia, was ignited by an unknown source. Four City of Dublin gas department employees who were working in the excavation were critically burned.
- September 10 – A bulldozer being used for highway construction hit a Diamond Shamrock pipeline in Roanoke, Texas, spilling unleaded gasoline. 5 miles of a nearby highway were shut down for a time.
- September 13 – A county worker hit an NGL pipeline near Leavenworth, Kansas, causing minor injuries to him when the escaping gas blew him off of the bulldozer. Several families living nearby were evacuated. There was no fire.
- October 1 – A steel plate, which had been welded by a work crew to cap temporarily the open end of a section of a 22-inch gas transmission pipeline, blew off at an initial pressure of possibly 260 psig. Escaping natural gas from the pipeline, which had accumulated due to a leak in a nearby gate valve, ignited almost immediately and the entire work area and a portion of U.S. Route 65 were momentarily engulfed in flames. Seven persons who were working to replace a section of the pipeline under the road about 2 miles (3.2 km) south of Pine Bluff, Arkansas, were burned.
- October 29 – A crew mechanic working on new gas service lines in Burke, Virginia, was overcome by leaking gas and died.
- November 4 – A tile plow installing field drainage tile on a farm, located 4 miles (6.4 km) west of Hudson, Iowa, struck and punctured a well-marked, 20-inch natural gas transmission pipeline. Natural gas escaping at about 820 psig ignited immediately, and the ensuing fire killed five persons.
- December 8 – A five-member crew was working on a gas compressor at Bonicord, Tennessee, when a gas explosion occurred. All five crew members were injured seriously, but were able to evacuate the building. One crew member died later that day, and two others died a few days later.
- December 21 – A grader working on construction cut into a crude oil pipeline in Norman, Oklahoma, causing a fire that severely burned the grader operator.

=== 1983 ===
- January 1983 – A pipeline owned by Diamond Shamrock began to leak into a creek, in Lipscomb County, Texas. Before the leak was detected and the flow of oil shut down, a period of about two weeks, about 100,000 gallons of crude petroleum were discharged into a creek.
- February 1 – A corroded gas service line caused a natural gas explosion and flash fire that destroyed a house, killed two persons, and injured three persons in Pryor, Oklahoma, and damaged an adjacent house.
- February 15 – A gas pipeline failed and caused a fire, with flames 250 to 300 feet (91 m) tall, near Marlow, Oklahoma. There were no injuries.
- March 15 – An 8-inch LPG pipeline was hit by a rotating auger used for planting trees near West Odessa, Texas. After several minutes, the escaping LPG at 1,060 psi ignited, killing 5 people and injuring 5 others. Flames went as high as 600 feet into the air.
- March 27 – A pump for a petroleum products pipeline broke, causing up to 420,000 gallons of diesel fuel to spill into the Bowie River in Collins, Mississippi.
- May 1 – 30 to 40 homes were advised to evacuate for several hours in Castle Shannon, Pennsylvania after a Mobil pipeline leaked gasoline.
- May 6 – A gas pipeline broke, forcing 100 people to evacuate in Cherry Hill, New Jersey.
- May 21 – A 36-inch gas transmission pipeline exploded and burned in Caldwell, Ohio, destroying two homes, burning 100 acres of vegetation, and closing nearby Interstate 77. There were three minor injuries.
- June 4 – A front loader accidentally dug into the 10-inch Yellowstone Pipeline petroleum line near Coeur d'Alene, Idaho, spilling over 20,000 US gallons (76,000 L) of unleaded gasoline into a creek, killing everything downstream for 3 miles.
- July 19 – A 16-inch gas pipeline ruptured and burned near Athens, Texas. A nearby section of the same pipeline had ruptured the year before.
- September 23 – East Boston gas surge: Gas service pressure surged up in a section of Boston, Massachusetts. 3 major structure fires, numerous smaller fires, and an explosion at a restaurant followed. There was no serious injuries. A flooded gas regulator vault was the cause.
- October 10 – A bulldozer ruptured a gas pipeline serving the Lake Park, Iowa area, causing gas supply shortages in the area. There were no injuries.
- October 11 – A 10-inch gasoline pipeline leaked between 20,000 and 42,000 gallons of gasoline, in Stow, Ohio. There were no injuries.
- October 17 – 18 people inside a supermarket in South Charleston, West Virginia were hurt when gas from a leaking Columbia Gas line exploded. One Columbia Gas worker was also hurt. The lack of communication from the Columbia crew working on the gas line to the store Manager was cited as a contributing factor.
- December 25 – A Mid-Valley crude oil pipeline exploded and burned, at a pipeline terminal, in Lima, Ohio. The fire spread to a holding tank, forcing nearby residents to evacuate.

=== 1984 ===
- January 15 – A leak was discovered in an 8-inch pipeline belonging to Plantation Pipeline in Floyd County, Georgia. Over 300 gallons of gasoline and diesel fuel had spilled into creek. A hayfield nearby was also damaged.
- February 28 – An 8-inch NGL pipeline near Hurst, Texas, was hit by a front loader, and the escaping gases ignited, causing burns to the equipment operator.
- March 25 – A resident in Missouri City, Texas discovered gasoline leaking from an 8-inch Exxon products pipeline. About 1,000 residents in the area were evacuated for a time, and, some of the gasoline entered a nearby creek.
- March 27 – An 8-inch Dow propane pipeline rupture & following vapor cloud explosion destroyed a home, damaged 4 other buildings, and knocked out power, in Mont Belvieu, Texas
- April 24 – A contractor installing plastic drainage pipe on a farm near Rock Rapids, Iowa hit a petroleum products pipeline, spilling about 4,000 gallons of diesel fuel.
- June 19 – Six employees of a contractor working for Washington Gas Light Company (WGL) in Rockville, Maryland, were using mechanical saws to cut a section of 22-inch steel pipeline when residual gas at atmospheric pressure in the isolated section of the pipeline was ignited. A flash fire ensued, and four contractor employees who were operating the saws and a WGL superintendent were burned.
- August 14 – A Plantation Pipeline line leaked near Ladysmith, Virginia, creating a gasoline mist in the area.
- Two natural gas pipelines exploded and burned near Falls City, Texas.
- September 24 – A failed gas main of ABS plastic caused an explosion and fire in Phoenix, Arizona. 5 people died and 7 others injured in the accident. Liquid in the pipe had caused it to break down.
- October 16 – A tugboat hit and ruptured a gas pipeline on the Houston Ship Channel. There were no injuries, but the Channel was closed for a time.
- October 27 and 28 – Fast moving water in the Cado Creek near Durant, Oklahoma led to 2 pipelines being ruptured. One pipeline was owned by Mobil, the other pipeline was owned by Total S.A. About 1,500 barrels (240 m^{3}) of petroleum were spilled.
- November 18 – A Williams Companies 6 inch pipeline ruptured in New Brighton, Minnesota, causing a spill of 40,000 to 50,000 gallons of jet fuel in an industrial area. There were no injuries.
- November 25 – A 30-inch gas transmission pipeline, constructed in 1955 and operating at 1,000 psig pressure, ruptured at a location about three miles (5 km) west of Jackson, Louisiana. Gas blowing from the rupture fractured the pipe into many pieces and created a hole in the earth about 90 feet (27 m) long, 25 feet (7.6 m) wide, and 10 feet (3.0 m) deep. The escaping gas was quickly ignited by one of several potential sources of ignition. The resulting fire incinerated an area extending from the rupture about 950 feet (290 m) north, 500 feet (150 m) south, and 180 feet (55 m) to the east and to the west. Within this sparsely populated area, five persons involved with the pipeline construction work were killed, and 23 persons were injured. Additionally, several pieces of construction equipment were damaged extensively. Lack of proper ground support under the pipeline when a nearby section of that pipeline was upgraded and replaced was identified as a factor in the failure.

=== 1985 ===
- January 8 – Natural gas from a leaking line traveled through soil, and caused a massive gas explosion in El Paso, Texas. Eleven people were injured, 2 homes were destroyed, and 88 other homes were damaged by the blast.
- Januar4 26 – A leaking propylene pipeline in Baytown, Texas forced the evacuation of 600 people. There was no explosion or fire.
- February 5 – A gas triggered explosion and fire destroyed 12 newly constructed condominiums in Twin Lakes, Wisconsin. A cracked gas main was the source of the gas leak, and nearby sewer work was suspected of damaging the gas line. Two firefighters were hurt extinguishing the fire.
- February 22 – A police patrolman on routine patrol smelled strong natural gas odors in Sharpsville, Pennsylvania. A gas serviceman was ordered to the scene. Before the serviceman arrived at the site of the reported leak, the Sharpsville Inn, and a connecting building, exploded and burned, killing two persons. Firefighters arriving on scene moments later encountered a second, smaller explosion, which injured one firefighter. The delay in the gas serviceman getting to the incident was a contributing factor.
- April 5 – Lightning caused a computer malfunction with Colonial Pipeline, resulting in a pipeline rupture that sent at least 126,000 gallons of gasoline into the Yellow Leaf Creek in Talladega County, Alabama.
- April 18 – Fumes from an NGL pipeline, under repair near Baxter Pass, Colorado, killed one pipeline repair worker, & injured 9 others. During a lawsuit dealing with this accident, it was claimed "The "safety" procedures used were crude at best, as the workers without lifelines were directed to hold their breath and go down into the ditch for about 30 seconds to work, before coming back out of the ditch for air."
- April 27
  - A Marathon Pipe Line pipeline ruptured, releasing 10,775 barrels (452,550 gallons) of a Southern Louisiana crude oil into Newton Lake, a 1,750-acre electric power plant cooling lake in Jasper County, Illinois.
  - A 30-inch diameter gas pipeline operating at about 960 psi, weakened by atmospheric corrosion, ruptured, and tore out about 29 feet (8.8 m) of the carrier pipe, blew apart about 16 feet (4.9 m) of a 36-inch casing pipe, blasted an opening across Kentucky State Highway 90, and cut out a pear-shaped crater approximately 90 feet (27 m) long, 38 feet (12 m) wide, and 12 feet (3.7 m) deep near Beaumont, Kentucky. 5 people were killed in one home, and 3 injured. The fireball from the incident could be seen 20 miles away.
- May 10 – A Mohave County, Arizona road crew hit a 2-inch gas pipeline, while reinstalling a fallen stop sign, in Butler, Arizona. During repairs to the gas line, a flash fire ignited, injuring 2 fire fighters, and a Southern Union Gas Co. worker.
- June 19 – Workers on the extension of the North Dallas Tollway ruptured a 12-inch gasoline pipeline, causing a massive gasoline spill along a creek bed north of Dallas, Texas. The gasoline later ignited. One person had moderate injuries, several office buildings were damaged by fire, and some automobiles were damaged.
- June 20 – A telephone cable installing crew broke a 10-inch gas gathering pipeline, in Paradise, Texas, releasing gas, that ignited 20 seconds later. There were no injuries.
- July 23 – In a rural area about 8 miles (13 km) south of Kaycee, Wyoming, a girth weld cracked during a pipeline re-coating project on a 23-year-old, 8-inch pipeline. The cracked girth weld allowed the release, atomization of, and ignition of aircraft turbine fuel under 430 pounds pressure, killing one person, burning six other persons, and destroying construction equipment.
- August 2 – A gasoline leak of up to 42,000 US gallons (160,000 L) from a ruptured 10-inch pipeline ignited in Indianapolis, Indiana, causing a 200-foot (61 m) high fireball that killed three people, and injured 3 others working to clean up the spill along a creek.
- August 22 – A vessel was being filled with Liquefied Natural Gas (LNG), when it burst, leading to a flash fire that burned 6 people, at a gas facility in Pinson, Alabama.
- September 23 – A 12-inch diameter gasoline pipeline fitting was hit by a backhoe, and sprayed about 35,000 US gallons (130,000 L) of gasoline 45 feet (14 m) into the air in Staten Island, New York. There were evacuations, but no fire.
- October 26 – A Texas Eastern Transmission Corp. natural gas pipeline exploded near Hillsboro in Fleming County, Kentucky on October 26. There were two injuries reported.
- November 1 – A Columbia Gas Transmission pipeline exploded and burned near Rowenna, Pennsylvania, shooting flames 200 feet into the air, and causing dozens of residents to evacuate. A gas metering station and pressure regulator were also damaged.
- November 6 – A MAPCO pipeline leaked an ethane-propane mix, causing injuries to 2 pipeline workers, in Clinton County, Iowa.
- November 28 – Olympic Pipeline spilled about 31,000 gallons of jet fuel at Seattle–Tacoma International Airport, due to a valve being left open. The fuel entered a storm drain, that led to the Des Moines River, killing fish and wildlife for 2.5 miles. Later, the company was fined $15,000 for the spill by the Washington Department of Ecology.
- December 5 – A Central Florida Pipeline products line burst in Lake Alfred, Florida, spilling about 40,000 gallons of gasoline. The landowner affected later sued the pipeline for failure to remove contaminated soil. There were no injuries or fire.
- December 6 – A natural gas explosion and fire destroyed the River Restaurant in Derby, Connecticut. Gas escaping from a broken gas main at a pressure of about 1 pound per square inch had escaped, migrated into the restaurant basement, ignited, exploded, and burned. Of the 18 persons inside the restaurant at the time, 6 were killed and 12 were injured; 1 passerby and 1 firefighter were also injured. After the accident the street adjacent to the restaurant was excavated where a 24-inch sewer system had just been installed; An 87-year-old, 3-inch, cast-iron natural gas main was found broken.
- December 18 – A water department crew hit the cap of an illegal tap into a Four Corners crude oil pipeline on December 18, near Cabazon, California. About 47,000 gallons of crude were spilled.

=== 1986 ===
- January 31 – A 14-inch Sunoco pipeline began leaking gasoline in Mercer County, New Jersey, which then spilled into the Delaware and Raritan Canal. The spilled gasoline exploded and burned along a 2,500 foot portion of the canal. People were evacuated from homes, and a nearby church.
- February 10 – A construction crew cut through a gas pipeline in Lakeland, Florida, resulting in about 175 people being evacuated from mobile homes and businesses for 2 hours. There were no injuries.
- February 21 – Near Lancaster, Kentucky, a 30-inch diameter Texas Eastern Transmission Pipeline gas pipeline ruptured due to corrosion. 3 people had serious burns, and 5 others had lesser injuries. External corrosion made worse by difficulties of cathodic protection in rocky soil was the cause. The pipe was manufactured in 1957. A senior vice president for operations and engineering with Texas Eastern Gas Pipeline Co. said tests on the Garrard County line last September showed the line needed immediate replacement. It was the third explosion on the Texas Eastern pipeline system in Kentucky in the previous 10 months, leading the Kentucky PSC to call for pressure reductions on the Texas Eastern system.
- February 22 – An 8-inch diameter high-pressure petroleum pipeline ruptured in Muskegon County, Michigan, spilling gasoline into creeks.
- February 24 – A natural gas transmission pipeline split for 40 feet along its longitudinal seam in Case, Arkansas. Examining the pipe after the accident revealed lack of fusion, a known issue with LF-ERW pipe used there. The pipeline has experienced 3 other such seam failures on that pipeline since 1975.
- March 12 – A backhoe snagged a natural gas distribution line in Fort Worth, Texas, causing a break that leaked gas into an unoccupied building. Later, that building exploded, injuring 22 people, destroying the unoccupied building and damaging 40 other buildings. 57 automobiles in the unoccupied building were damaged or destroyed.
- March 13 – A new water main was being installed in Chicago Heights, Illinois on March 13. While excavating, an active gas service line was snagged. Gas company crews responded to the wrong site, causing delays in getting the leaking gas line shut down. Just as crews finished closing the valve on the leaking line, a nearby house exploded, and began to burn; One of the two persons inside that house was killed, and the other was injured. Two neighboring houses were damaged, and one gas company employee, two construction crew members, and four persons in the general area, were injured by the explosion and subsequent fire. Although gas company personnel arrived on the scene approximately 10 minutes before the explosion and shut off the gas at the meter, neither they nor the contractor's crew had made an effort to warn or evacuate the residents of the house.
- April 12 – A gravel company endloader ruptured a Lakehead Pipeline crude oil pipeline on April 12 near Elgin, Illinois, spilling about 525,000 gallons of crude, and causing a "geyser" of crude oil.
- May 8 – A backhoe ruptured an Olympic Pipeline line on May 8, south of Seattle, Washington. About 1,974 barrels of diesel fuel were spilled, with some of it entering the Green River.
- May 14 – A 6-inch Amoco pipeline, damaged by some type of arcing, leaked about 380 barrels of gasoline in Elmhurst, Illinois. Some of the gasoline fumes exploded in a nearby home, causing serious damage. Concerns about the lack of evacuations were raised later on. There were no injuries reported.
- June 28 – A pipeline ruptured and spilled diesel fuel into Trail Creek in Michigan City, Indiana. The fuel later ignited. Thousands of fish were killed.
- July 2 – An explosion at a Williams Companies pipeline Terminal in Milford, Iowa injured 6 people, with 2 of them dying later on.
- July 8 – Early on that day, a Williams Companies petroleum products pipeline ruptured in Mounds View, Minnesota. Gasoline at 1,434 psi sprayed a residential area around 4:20 am local time, then ignited. A woman and her 7-year-old daughter suffered fatal burns, at least two others were injured, and many homes damaged or destroyed. Confusion by the pipeline company led to a delay in shutting down the pipeline. Electrical resistance welded (ERW) seam failure caused the rupture. Prior to this accident, this pipeline, installed in 1957, had 16 seam failures during hydrostatic testing, and 7 seam failures during operations until 1984. In 1984, 16 more seams failed during a hydrostatic test. Problems with cathodic protection were also noted before the 1986 accident. During a hydrostatic test of this pipeline following the accident, 3 ERW seams failed. Studies of available data by OPS staff in early 1988 showed that ERW seams have been involved in 145 service failures in both hazardous liquid and natural gas pipelines since 1970 to early 1988, and that of these failures, all but 2 occurred on pipe manufactured prior to 1970.
- July 12 – A Southern Natural Gas transmission pipeline failed and burned, in a compressor station, near Prattville, Alabama. The fire spread by melting flange gaskets on 2 other gas transmission pipelines in the station. 4 homes and several cars were destroyed in the following fire, with flames reaching 300 feet (91 m) high. There were no injuries.
- July 22 – A leak at an underground propane storage facility in Petal, Mississippi exploded, causing a massive fire, injuring 14 people, and forcing 200 people to evacuate. A crater 260 feet in diameter and 37 feet deep was made by the explosion.
- August 28 – Two workers checking the inside of a 30-inch gas pipeline were apparently overcome by nitrogen being used to purge that pipeline, in Flemingburg, Kentucky, and died. 6 other workers were injured in that incident.
- September 4
  - A tank failed at a Phillips Petroleum Company facility in East Chicago, Indiana, forcing 800 to 1,200 residents nearby to evacuate, and spilling 55,000 barrels of gasoline. 28 people were overcome by gasoline fumes. There was no fire.
  - A CENEX 8 inch petroleum products pipeline failed near Billings, Montana, spilling gasoline, and causing the evacuation of nearby businesses. About 29,400 gallons of gasoline spilled. There was no fire.
- September 8 – An Amoco gas condensate pipeline failed under the Red River near Dexter, Texas. Fumes from the leaking pipeline sent 14 people to hospitals for treatment.
- October 7 – A 21-inch long crack on a 14-inch Sunoco petroleum products pipeline in King of Prussia, Pennsylvania spilled about 220,000 gallons of gasoline, forcing evacuations, including about 900 students from a middle school. The failure was near a previously repaired area.
- November 11 - A 10 inch natural gasoline pipeline exploded & burned, destroying a home, & forcing evacuations, in Baytown, Texas. There were no injuries reported.
- November 13 – A gas transmission pipeline failed near Stinnett, Texas, killing one person. The pipeline has been installed in 1982.
- December 6 – In the early morning hours, a 30-inch natural gas pipe line exploded on the north edge of the Ross Barnett Reservoir (Pelahatchie Bay) in Mississippi, near Jackson. There were no casualties. The blast was seen by airline pilots as far away as Houston TX and Nashville TN.
- December 25 – An Amoco pipeline ruptured, and spilled furnace oil into the Des Plaines River near Chicago, Illinois. About 429 barrels of furnace oil were spilled. External corrosion was the cause of the pipeline failure.

=== 1987 ===
- January 30 – Natural gas leaking from a pipeline under repair in Colorado Springs, Colorado, ignited, sending flames 45 feet into the air, and injuring four people.
- March 12 – A petroleum pipeline ruptured and burned near Corsicana, Texas, forcing the closure of an Interstate highway, and causing some evacuations.
- March 26 – A work crew burning the remains of a house near Ladysmith, Virginia ruptured a nearby petroleum products pipeline with a bulldozer, igniting diesel fuel from the line. 2 of the workers were injured.
- April 4 – An LPG pipeline exploded at a Terminal in Iowa City, Iowa. Due to the fire spreading to a pipeline for nearby underground gas storage, residents within a 2 1/2-mile radius of the Terminal were evacuated for a time. The fire burned until April 20. The cause was an ERW seam failure in a pipeline. During a hydrostatic test of that pipeline, 20 more pipeline segment seams failed.
- April 18 – In Odessa, Texas, a crude oil pipeline burst into flames, destroying nine mobile homes and two cars. The fire started under a mobile home on Andrews Highway. The Texas Railroad Commission stated that gases within the crude corroded and weakened the 10-inch 60-year-old pipe. When the line split, it spewed oil into the fire, fueling the blaze and causing dense black smoke that choked firefighters and bystanders.
- June 8 – A Mobil pipeline ruptured near Lebec, California, spilling about 2,500 barrels of crude oil. The failure was from external corrosion of the pipeline.
- June 11
  - A "rock ripper" at a construction site punctured a 32-inch Colonial Pipeline petroleum products pipeline in Centreville, Virginia. Gasoline sprayed from the rupture, but there was no fire. More than 15,500 US gallons (59,000 L) of gasoline were released. Thirteen emergency response personnel suffered from exposure to the gasoline fumes.
  - An Amoco pipeline failed in Florence, Michigan, spilling 24,000 barrels of petroleum.
- June 12 – A petroleum products pipeline ruptured near Harwood, North Dakota. 289 barrels of fuel oil were spilled. There were no injuries. Investigation showed this pipeline failed at a low frequency Electric Resistance Welding (ERW) seam. Further testing after this accident lead to 5 other LF-ERW failures along this pipeline in Minnesota and North Dakota.
- June 26 – Construction equipment hit a LPG/NGL pipeline near Rochester, Iowa on June 26, killing one person, and injuring 2 others.
- July 3 – A Yellowstone Pipeline Company line failed from an unspecified flaw in the pipe, in Montana. About 162,000 gallons of petroleum product were lost.
- July 23 – A construction crew working on an Interstate 90 project east of Coeur d'Alene, Idaho struck the 10-inch diameter Yellowstone Pipeline, causing a leak that sprayed out over 27,000 gallons of gasoline. The pipeline was supposed to have 30 inches of soil cover, but had only 2 inches of cover. There was no fire.
- July 24 – A fishing vessel, working in shallow waters off of Empire, Louisiana, the Fishing vessel Sea Chief, struck and ruptured an 8" natural gas liquids pipeline operating at 480 psi. The resulting explosion killed two crew members. Divers investigating found that the pipe, installed in 1968, was covered with only 6" of soft mud, having lost its original 3-foot (0.91 m) cover of sediments.
- August 5 – A gas leak on a busy road in Wilmington, North Carolina suddenly ignited, while gas company workers were trying to plug that leak, burning them and firefighters on standby. 19 people were burned, with a Fire Department Assistant Chief later dying from the burns he received.
- September 9 – 3 pipeline workers were hurt, when a 6-inch butane pipeline they were working on exploded, near Kemah, Texas.
- October 19 – 4 pipeline workers were hurt while working on a Columbia Gas Transmission pipeline in Martin, Kentucky. A rubber seal inside a steel collar failed, allowing 2 sections of pipeline to separate. There was no fire.

=== 1988 ===
- January 5 – A Colonial Pipeline mainline ruptured, spilling about 100,000 gallons of home heating oil in Deptford Township, New Jersey. The cause of the pipeline failure was corrosion.
- January 18 – A natural gas explosion destroyed the building housing the K&W Cafeteria and the lobby of the Sheraton Motor Inn at Winston-Salem, North Carolina. Two adjoining motel wings suffered structural damage. Of the four persons in the lobby/cafeteria building at the time of the explosion, three sustained minor injuries. The fourth person sustained a fractured ankle. One motel guest also sustained minor cuts.
- January – The rupture of a large interstate gas line at Pocono Ridge development in Lehman Township, Pennsylvania, left a crater about 8 feet (2.4 m) deep and ejected a 6-foot (1.8 m) section of pipe over the treetops before it landed 50 yards away. One hundred thirty people were evacuated. No one was injured.
- February 8 – An offshore pipeline near Galveston, Texas, that may have been damaged by an anchor, ruptured, spilling about 15,576 barrels (2,476.4 m^{3}) of crude oil into the Gulf.
- February 17 – A Sunoco pipeline near Pleasant Township, Seneca County, Ohio ruptured, spilling over 200,000 gallons of toluene, with about 173,000 gallons of it being lost. 4,200 people had to evacuate their homes for a time. The cause was previous third party damage.
- March 19 – 130 people were evacuated from their homes, after a vehicle hit a valve on a Columbia Gas Transmission pipeline in Hempfield, Pennsylvania. There was no gas ignition.
- April 9 – A 20-inch crude oil pipeline failed in a Peoria County, Illinois subdivision. About 200,000 US gallons (760,000 L) of crude were spilled, contaminating 2 private lakes.
- April 15 – At a Sunoco tank farm in Crittenden County, Arkansas, a spill resulted in the loss of about 29,000 gallons of petroleum products.
- April 18 – A backhoe hit a 10-inch gas pipeline in Springfield, Massachusetts. Two Interstate freeways were shut down, and, 125 to 150 people were evacuated for a time from nearby businesses.
- April 26 – A Kaneb Pipeline Terminal had a spill of 20,000 gallons of gasoline, in Milford, Iowa. Operator error was given as the cause of the spill.
- June 16 – An Enbridge crude oil pipeline failed near Romeo, Michigan, spilling about 370,000 gallons of crude oil. Attempt to burn the crude oil led to vegetation fires in the area.
- July 22 – A pair of MAPCO LPG/NGL pipelines failed in an explosion south of Topeka, Kansas. 200 nearby residents had to be evacuated, and there was serious damage to US Route 75 nearby from the explosion & following fire. An ERW seam selective corrosion failure in one of the pipelines caused the failure.
- August 31 – A gas company crew struck and ruptured a fitting on a 4-inch plastic gas main in Green Oaks, Illinois. While the crew was attempting to excavate a nearby valve to shut off the flow of gas, the backhoe struck an unmarked power cable. The gas ignited and four gas company employees were injured.
- September 1 – A crude oil pipeline ruptured, spilling about 132,000 gallons of crude oil in Encino, California. The crude flowed into storm drains, and then into the Los Angeles River. Electrical interference to Cathodic protection from other pipelines was suspected to have cause the corrosion that caused the failure. The crude oil pipeline was on top of a steel water pipeline, which would directly interfere with Cathodic protection efforts.
- September 16 – A natural gas explosion in Overland Park, Kansas, involved gas leaking from corrosion holes in the customer-owned line. Gas migrated underground to the house and was ignited. The house was destroyed and the four residents were injured.
- October 9 – Third party damage to a Yellowstone Pipeline Company line caused the line to fail, near Garrison, Montana. About 260,000 gallons of petroleum products were lost.
- October 11 – Corrosion caused a Chevron LPG pipeline to fail, in Martin County, Texas. One person was killed.
- November 8 – Corrosion of a 14-inch underground pipeline owned and operated by the Shell Oil Company, a predecessor of Shell Pipeline Corporation (Shell), resulted in the release of an estimated 120,000 US gallons (450,000 L) of gasoline. A pool of gasoline about 450 feet (140 m) by 50 feet (15 m) appeared among fields of corn and soybeans. The site of the release was in Limestone Township in Kankakee County, about 4 miles (6.4 km) west of Kankakee, Illinois. Approximately 2,100 people live within a 1-mile (1.6 km) radius of the November 1988 release point.
- November 18 – Thousands of air travelers were temporarily stranded after a construction crew at San Francisco International Airport accidentally ruptured an underground jet fuel pipeline. The break, which spilled 50,000 gallons before the pipeline was shut down, cut off fuel supplies to all three of the airport's airline terminals. More than 200 flights were disrupted, officials said.
- November 25 – A natural gas explosion and fire in Kansas City, Missouri, involved a break in a customer owned service line, at a threaded joint that was affected by corrosion. One person was killed and five persons injured in the explosion that severely damaged the residence.
- November 28 – A mower hit a propane pipeline & ruptured it in Friendswood, Texas. About 4,836 barrels of propane were lost. 2 people were injured.
- December 1 – A Koch Industries and Ashland Oil subsidiary 16 inch crude oil pipeline failed near Dellwood, Minnesota, spilling about 200,000 US gallons (760,000 L) of crude on a farm. Snow complicated the cleanup. The leak occurred late December 1, but was not discovered until early December 2. An ERW seam fatigue crack caused the failure.
- December 11 – A natural gas pipeline outside Carthage, Texas, exploded and burned, forcing residents of two nearby subdivisions to evacuate. No injuries were reported.
- December 24 – A 22-inch Shell Oil Company crude oil pipeline ruptured near Vienna, Missouri, spilling more than 860,000 US gallons (3,300,000 L) of crude oil into the Gasconade River. A pipeline worker in Oklahoma failed to notice the pipeline's plummeting pressure gauges for at least two hours. 1,000 workers at a brewery were idled for 3 days, due to the pollution of the breweries' water source. An ERW seam defect in the pipe was determined to be the cause of the failure.

=== 1989 ===
The following incidents occurred in 1989:

- January 3 – A road grader hit a 6-inch Colonial Pipeline stub line in Fort Bragg, North Carolina, causing a gasoline spill. There was no fire or injuries.
- January 24 – A Texaco crude oil pipeline ruptured on January 24 in Winkler County, Texas spilling over 23,000 barrels (3,700 m^{3}) of oil. 6 acres (24,000 m^{2}) of land were covered in oil, and groundwater was contaminated.
- January 25 – A 12-inch pipeline owned by Delhi Gas Pipeline exploded and burned near Lolita, Texas.
- February 10 – A natural gas explosion and fire in Oak Grove, Missouri involved the failure of a customer owned service line at a threaded joint. Two persons were killed and their house was destroyed in the explosion.
- March 25 – A leaking gas distribution line caused an explosion in Topeka, Kansas, killing one person. This was the latest in a string of gas distribution line failures that lead to an NTSB investigation into the regional gas company. 600,000 gas services lines were replaced as a result of the investigation.
- March 28 – A 34-inch Lakehead Pipeline ruptured near Sanders, Minnesota, spilling 300 barrels of crude oil, of which 270 were recovered.
- March 29 – A road grader hit a gas pipeline near Tuttle, Oklahoma. The grader driver was burned to death.
- April 10 – A Dow Chemical Company NGL pipeline in Amber Township, Michigan was being purged by passing a plastic pipeline pig propelled by compressed air. Iron sulfide residue inside the pipeline reacted, causing an explosion that burst 20 holes through the pipeline. There were no injuries.
- May 25 – San Bernardino train disaster: A Calnev Pipeline petroleum products pipeline failed when cleanup performed after the train derailment caused damage to a petroleum products pipeline, spraying nearby homes with gasoline, which ignited shortly after the pipeline failure. Two people were killed, 31 were injured, 18 automobiles were destroyed, and 15 homes were damaged or destroyed in following fire. The pipeline operator did not recognize there was a leak in the pipeline, and restarted pumps for the pipeline 3 times, after automatic shut downs. A backflow prevention valve up hill of the failure also failed to close, intensifying the fire.
- June 2 – An Amoco 6 inch crude oil gathering pipeline ruptured near Craig, Colorado on June 2, spilling 10,000 US gallons (38,000 L) of crude into the Yampa River. Federal maintenance oversight of gathering pipelines ended in 1985.
- June 6 – A road grader hit a Conoco LPG pipeline in Laclede County, Texas. One person was killed.
- June 27 – A Mobil petroleum gathering pipeline spilled about 40 barrels of light oil into Lake Texana near Edna, Texas on June 27. The failure was caused by corrosion.
- July 13 – An Enbridge pipeline failed in Pembina County, North Dakota resulting in 31,300 barrels of crude oil being spilled, and about $2.4 million in damages & cleanup.
- July 24 – excavation equipment hit a petroleum products pipeline in Kansas City, Kansas near I-70. About 693,000 gallons of product were spilled.
- August 19 – Gramercy Park asbestos steam explosion: A steam pipe explosion in Gramercy Park killed three, injured 24, and required the evacuation of a damaged apartment building due to high levels of asbestos in the air. Workers had failed to drain water from the pipe before turning the steam on. The utility also eventually pleaded guilty to lying about the absence of asbestos contamination, and paid a $2 million fine.
- September 13 – A bulldozer hit a petroleum products pipeline in a stream bed in Salem, Oregon on September 13. Gasoline entered a creek, killing fish and forcing evacuations. About 23,000 to 30,000 gallons of gasoline were spilled.
- October 3 – The United States menhaden' fishing vessel NORTHUMBERLAND, owned and operated by the Zapata Haynie Corporation (vessel owner), was backing and maneuvering in 9 to 11 feet (3.4 m) of water when the stern of the vessel struck and ruptured an offshore 16-inch natural gas transmission pipeline. Natural gas under 835 pounds per square inch pressure was released. An undetermined source on board the vessel ignited the gas, and within seconds the entire vessel was engulfed in flames. The fire on the vessel burned until 4:30 a.m. on October 4, when it burned itself out. Leaking gas from the pipeline also continued to burn until the flow of gas subsided and the fire self-extinguished about 6 a.m. on October 4. Eleven of fourteen crew members died as a result of the accident.
- October 25 – An explosion at a valve in a natural gas processing station on October 25 near Evanston, Wyoming killed one worker, and injured 4 others.
- November 16 – Propane from a storage cavern for a pipeline escaped and ignited in Jasper, Missouri, forcing 1,000 people to evacuate. A rail line and a highway were also closed.
- December 8 – A farmer hit a propane pipeline near Butler, Illinois on December 8, forcing evacuation of that town. There was no fire.
- December 18 – A Colonial Pipeline petroleum pipeline failed near Locust Grove, Virginia. 212,000 US gallons (800,000 L) of kerosene spilled into the Rapidan and Rappahannock Rivers. On New Year's Eve, following a rapid thaw and heavy rains, containment dams broke and kerosene flowed downstream toward Fredericksburg, Virginia. Fish and game were killed, the city's water supply was cut off, and drinking water had to be hauled from Stafford County for seven days. The failure was caused by cracking caused during railroad shipping of the pipe before being installed. This was the seventh major leak from Colonial Pipeline in Virginia since 1973.
- December 29 – Shock waves from an explosion ruptured a 30-inch gas transmission pipeline operating at 350 psi in the Hell Gate section of New York City, New York. The rupture was 11 feet long, and escaping gas ignited, killing 2 people, injuring one other person, and destroying 2 buildings and 50 automobiles.
