= Heartland Petrochemical Complex =

Plastic manufacturing plant in Alberta, Canada

Inter Pipeline's Heartland Petrochemical Complex is a $3.5-billion project in Fort Saskatchewan, Alberta which will produce recyclable plastics from the province's propane. With its anticipated completion in 2021, Inter Pipeline's complex would be Canada's "first integrated propane dehydrogenation and polypropylene facility." The Complex is expected to create 2,300 jobs in construction and facility operations.

== Background ==
Inter Pipeline's (Note: In 1997, Koch Industries was separated into two entities including Koch Pipelines Canada for transporting conventional oil. According to Bloomberg News, Inter Pipeline is the parent company of Pipeline Management, which was known as Koch Pipelines Canada until the name change in 2003. Koch sold all but 1% of its share in 2001.) Complex Project is supported with up to $200-million in future royalty credits under the Alberta government's Petrochemicals Diversification Program. In March 2019, Navdeep Bains, Minister of Innovation, Science and Economic Development said that ISED would be investing $49 million towards the Complex as part of their "$1.6-billion plan to support jobs and workers in Canada’s oil and gas sector."

== Technology ==
Central to the project is the 97-metres high propylene-propane splitter weighing over 800 tonnes.

== Environment ==
Environmentalists opposed the proposed plant along with Pembina Pipeline Corp.’s $4.5-billion petrochemical proposed "integrated propane dehydrogenation plant and polypropylene upgrading facility", a joint venture with Kuwait's Petrochemical Industries Co, in Sturgeon. They say that "very little plastic is recycled in Canada — almost 90 per cent winds up as litter or in landfills". Notley said that "upgrading hydrocarbons at home instead of shipping raw product into the United States allows the province to ensure it has among the lowest emitting petrochemical producers in the world."
