= Brookfield Infrastructure Partners =

Canadian infrastructure management company

Brookfield Infrastructure Partners L.P.
- Type: Public
- Traded as: NYSE: BIP; TSX: BIP.UN; NYSE: BIPC; TSX: BIPC
- Industry: Infrastructure asset management
- Founded: January 14, 2008; 18 years ago
- Headquarters: Toronto, Ontario, Canada
- Area served: Worldwide
- Key people: Sam Pollock (CEO)
- Products: Utilities, transport, energy, communications, infrastructure
- Revenue: ▲US$21 billion (2024)
- Total assets: ▲US$36.916 billion (2024)
- Owner: Brookfield Asset Management (30%)
- Website: bip.brookfield.com

Brookfield Infrastructure Partners L.P. is a publicly traded limited partnership with corporate headquarters in Toronto, Canada, that engages in the acquisition and management of infrastructure assets on a global basis.

Until a spin-off in January 2008, Brookfield Infrastructure was an operating unit of Brookfield Asset Management, which retains a 30 percent ownership and acts as the partnership's general manager. The company's assets carried a book value of US$21.3 billion, on December 31, 2016.

In March 2020, Brookfield Infrastructure Partners (BIP) created Brookfield Infrastructure Corporation (BIPC), an entity that provides certain institutional investors who cannot hold a Bermuda-based Limited Partnership the ability to access the portfolio of BIP assets. In addition, by issuing eligible dividends rather than partnership distributions, BIP felt that BIPC would provide a more attractive and favourable tax treatment for retail investors. BIPC began trading on the Toronto and New York Stock Exchanges on March 31, 2020.

Brookfield Infrastructure Partners owns and operates a global network of infrastructure companies in utilities, transportation, energy and communications infrastructure. It invests in transmission and telecommunication lines, toll roads, ports and pipelines. The company has an equity market capitalization of about US$17.7 billion with an investment-return target of 12 to 15 percent. Its annualized total returns since inception have been 18% on the NYSE and 26% on the TSX.

Sam Pollock is the chief executive officer of Brookfield Infrastructure Partners. He has held this position since 2006, and has been with Brookfield Asset Management since 1994.

== Operations ==
After the spin-off from Brookfield Asset Management, Brookfield Infrastructure operated timber properties and electricity transmission lines. In September 2008, the company announced it would expand and diversify its global operations by buying infrastructure holdings from distressed Babcock & Brown, thus adding approximately US$8 billion of assets under management.

In 2010 the company completed a merger with Australian company Prime Infrastructure in which it held a minority interest.

In 2012, the company participated in a joint venture with Spain's Abertis Infraestructuras to purchase 60 percent of toll operator Obrascon Huarte Lain Brasil in a deal valued at US$1.7 billion.

Also in 2012, the company and its partners agreed to acquire the remaining 45% of the AVN toll road in Chile for a total purchase price of $590-million, after making an initial investment in 2011.

In 2014, the company and its investment partners agreed to acquire 50% of the French telecommunications units of TDF for $2.2 billion.

In 2016, the company announced agreements with Qube Holdings and other investment partners to buy the port assets of Asciano Limited, an Australian rail and port operator, for US $6.55 billion, (A$8.9 billion). The container port assets remained under the Patrick brand in a joint venture with Qube, while the bulk and automotive port services assets rebranded to Linx Cargo Care Group under a Brookfield-led consortium of investment partners. That same year, the company also announced that it and its investment partners would acquire a 90% stake in a Brazilian natural gas pipeline from Petroleo Brasileiro SA for US $5.2 billion.

The company made over $2 billion of new investments in 2016, including its first ventures into businesses in Peru and India. The company also invested in organic projects valued at $850 million, growing the size of its utilities rate base, road and rail networks and energy systems.

In 2022, the company announced an initiative with Intel to jointly invest up to $30 billion at a chip manufacturing plant in Chandler, Arizona.

As of December 31, 2022, BIP declared majority ownership and/or controlling voting interest in the following companies:

Country	Company	Sector	Effective Ownership	Voting Interest
Australia	Arc Infrastructure WA Pty Ltd	Rail transport	100%	100%
Australia	Linx Cargo Care Group Pty Ltd	Port operations	27%	67%
Australia	Ruby Pooling Hold Trust	Data centres	29%	100%
Brazil	Nova Transportadora do Sudeste S.A. ("NTS")	Energy Infrastructure	31%	92%
Canada	Enercare	Home and commercial energy services	26%	100%
Canada	Inter Pipeline Ltd.	Energy Infrastructure	56%	100%
Canada	NorthRiver Midstream Inc.	Energy Infrastructure	29%	100%
Canada	Warwick Gas Storage L.P.	Energy Infrastructure	25%	100%
Colombia	Vanti S.A. ESP	Energy Infrastructure	21%	75%
Germany	Thermondo GmbH	Residential energy infrastructure	11%	51%
India	Crest Digitel Private Ltd	Telecommunications	17%	62%
India	Pipeline Infrastructure	Energy Infrastructure	21%	75%
India	Rayalseema Expressway Private Limited	Toll Roads	29%	95%
India	Simhapuri Expressway Ltd	Toll Roads	29%	95%
India	Summit Digitel Infrastructure Private Ltd	Telecommunications	17%	62%
Peru	Rutas de Lima S.A.C.	Toll roads	17%	57%
Singapore	BIF India Holdings Pte Ltd	Toll roads	40%	93%
United Kingdom	BOXT Ltd	Residential infrastructure	15%	60%
United Kingdom	Brookfield Port Acquisitions (UK) Ltd	Port Operations	59%	100%
United Kingdom	BUUK Infrastructure No 1 Limited	Energy Infrastructure	80%	80%
United Kingdom	WIG Holdings I Limited	Data Centres	24%	98%
United States	Dawn Acquisitions LLC	Data Centres	29%	100%
United States^{[a]}	Genesee & Wyoming	Rail Transport	9%	72%
United States	Lodi Gas Storage LLC	Energy Infrastructure	40%	100%
United States	Rockpoint Gas Storage Partners L.P.	Energy Infrastructure	40%	100%

The following table lists prior acquisitions by BIP:

Country	Company	Sector	Ownership
Australia	Asciano Limited	Rail and port logistics	50%
Brazil	Arteris, SA	Toll roads	50%
Brazil	VLI	Transmission	26.5%
Brazil	Odoya Transmissora de Energia S.A. Esperanza Transmissora de Energia S.A. Jose Maria de Macedo de Eletricidade S.A; Giovanni Sanguinetti Transmissora de Energia S.A. Veredas Transmissora de Eletricidade S.A.	Transmission	31%
Canada	Enwave	District energy	
Canada	Metergy Solutions	Utility submetering	
Chile	Transelec	Energy Transmission	30%
France	TDF	Communication tower infrastructure	50%
North America (Canada and USA)	Niska Gas Storage	Gas storage	100%
United States	Natural Gas Pipeline Company of America	Gas storage and transmission	50%

== Notes ==
a.Although headquartered in the United States, Genesee & Wyoming also has rail and logistics operations in Canada, the U.K., and continental Europe.
