= Asciano Limited =

Former Australian logistics company

- Type: Public
- Traded as: ASX: AIO
- Industry: Transport, Logistics, Stevedoring and Rail transport
- Founded: 2007
- Defunct: 16 August 2016
- Fate: Split into separate companies as of 2016
- Successor: Pacific National; Patrick Container Terminals; Bulk & Automotive Port Services
- Headquarters: 476 St Kilda Road, Melbourne Australia
- Area served: Australia
- Key people: Malcolm Broomhead (Chairman); John Mullen (CEO)
- Subsidiaries: Pacific National; Patrick Corporation
- Website: www.asciano.com.au

Asciano Limited was an Australian freight logistics company, operating in railway freight and shipping. Asciano was demerged from Toll Holdings in 2007, and owned Patrick Corporation and Pacific National as subsidiary companies. Asciano specialised in bulk and container shipping and transportation, with port and train operations across Australia. It had over 8,000 employees. It was an ASX 50 company.

In June 2015, Brookfield Infrastructure Partners launched a takeover offer for the company, and Qube Holdings later made a counter offer. The offers had attracted the attention of the Australian Competition & Consumer Commission, with both already owning transport and port operations in Australia.

On 3 June 2016, shareholders of Asciano voted in favour of the takeover bid with the Foreign Investment Review Board announcing that it had no objections for the offer on 27 July 2016. The scheme implementation date was set on 19 August 2016 where payment of the Scheme consideration took place and the transaction was to be completed. After this date the assets of Asciano were to be divided as below.

- Asciano, including the Pacific National business became owned by Australian Logistics Acquisition Investments Pty Limited, a consortium of Global Infrastructure Partners, CPP Investment Board, China Investment Corporation, GIC and British Columbia Investment Management Corporation. The transfer was completed on 19 August 2016.
- The Patrick Container Terminals business became owned by the Ports HoldCo joint venture which is controlled by Brookfield Infrastructure Partners, GIC, British Columbia Investment Management Corporation, Qatar Investment Authority, and Qube Holdings.
- The Patrick Bulk and Automotive Port Services business became owned by Brookfield Infrastructure Partners, GIC, British Columbia Investment Management Corporation, and Qatar Investment Authority, changing its name to Linx Cargo Care Group.
