= Natural Gas Pipeline Company of America =

Natural Gas Pipeline Company of America (NGPL) is a natural gas pipeline company. It owns pipelines which bring natural gas from the Texas Permian Basin and Gulf of Mexico into the Chicago area. It has had several corporate owners over the past century, and is owned by Kinder Morgan, Brookfield Infrastructure Partners, and ArcLight Capital Partners.

== Early history ==
NGPL traces its history to the Continental Construction Corporation, which changed its name to the Natural Gas Pipeline Company of America in December 1931. Continental Construction was incorporated about May 1, 1930, in Delaware and in Texas for the purpose of constructing a 24-inch natural gas pipline between the Amarillo, Texas, oil fields and Chicago, Illinois. The major incorporators included Standard Oil of New Jersey and Cities Service Corporation, with minority investments from the Insull utility interests, Phillips Petroleum, Skelly Oil, and others. Work began in Kansas and Nebraska in June, Iowa in July, and Indiana in September. The first hundred miles of pipe began to be laid in September 1930. The pipeline was completed on August 29, 1931, and gas began moving on September 1. It was the first 1,000-mile pipeline built in the United States, and the first high-pressure, thin-walled, electrically-welded, cross-country pipeline.

On December 16, 1948, Peoples Gas, the supplier of municipal natural gas in and around the city of Chicago, agreed to pay $32.6 million to acquire all the outstanding stock of NGPL. Peoples Gas changed its name to Peoples Energy in November 1979.

== MidCon ownership ==
In October 1981, Peoples Energy spun off NGPL and five other natural gas pipeline subsidiaries into a new publicly traded holding company named MidCon.

MidCon was subsequently purchased by Occidental Petroleum in January 1986 for $3 billion.

== Kinder Morgan ==
KN Energy (formerly Kansas Nebraska Energy) purchased Midcon for $4 billion in 1997. When the deal closed in January 1998, KN Energy became the owner of the second-largest natural gas pipeline system in the United States.

In July 1999, KN Energy agreed to buy natural gas pipeline operator Kinder Morgan, Inc. for $506 million in stock. Richard Kinder, formerly president of Enron Corp., formed Kinder Morgan in late 1996 as a vehicle to take control of the Enron Liquids Pipeline Company, a subsidiary of the Enron Corporation. That deal was worth $40 million. Enron Liquids Pipeline was renamed Kinder Morgan Energy Partners. Kinder was elected to KN Energy's board of directors in 1998.

Richard Kinder was named the president and chief executive officer of the merged company, which retained the Kinder Morgan name. The combined company owned 30,000 miles of pipeline (25,000 miles by Kinder Morgan and 5,000 miles by Kinder Morgan-owned Kinder Morgan Energy Partners).

== 2008 sale and 2015 repurchase ==
By 2001, NGPL accounted for approximately 56 percent of Kinder Morgan's entire income.

Seven years later, Kinder Morgan sold most of its ownership in NGPL. In February 2009, it sold an 80 percent interest in the pipeline firm to Myria Holdings, an investment holding company formed by Brookfield Infrastructure Partners, SteelRiver Infrastructure Partners, the Canadian Public Sector Pension Investment Board, and the Dutch pension fund PGGM.

By 2014, NGPL was "financially distressed", and warned creditors that it might miss interest payments on bonds. Kinder Morgan sought to divest itself of its remaining stake in NGPL in 2014, but in December 2015 the company announced it would increase its stake in NGPL to 50 percent, up from 30 percent. Brookfield Instrastructure Partners, which owned 27 percent of NGPL, agreed to increase its interest to 50 percent as well.

Kinder Morgan and Brookfield each sold 12.5 percent of their stake in NGPL in February 2021 to ArcLight Capital Partners (owners of Gulf Oil LP) for $830 million. At the time of the sale, NGPL had about 9,100 miles of natural gas pipeline.
