= Linx Cargo Care Group =

Australian logistics company

- Industry: Logistics
- Founded: August 2016; 9 years ago
- Headquarters: Sydney, Australia
- Area served: Australia and New Zealand
- Key people: Brett Grehan (Group CEO)
- Services: Transportation, rail, stevedoring, warehousing, port management, forestry, global forwarding
- Number of employees: 3,300
- Parent: British Columbia Investment Management Corporation; Brookfield Asset Management; GIC; Qatar Investment Authority
- Subsidiaries: Autocare Services; C3; Linx; Pedersen Group; GeelongPort (50%)
- Website: linxcc.com.au

Linx Cargo Care Group is a transportation and logistics company in Australia and New Zealand, headquartered in Sydney.

== History ==
LINX Cargo Care Group was founded in August 2016 when Asciano was broken up in August 2016. A group made up of the British Columbia Investment Management Corporation, Brookfield Asset Management, GIC, and the Qatar Investment Authority bought the Patrick Bulk and Automotive Port Services company and rebranded it as the Lynx Cargo Care Group.

== Business Units ==
=== Autocare Services ===
Autocare is a network of finished-vehicle logistics and related services established in 1961. It was purchased by Bulk in 1996, and became a part of Linx Cargo Care Group. Autocare underwent restructuring in 2021. In February 2024 the business was sold to the Optimus Group.

=== GeelongPort ===
GeelongPort, located in the Port of Geelong 75 kilometers southwest of Melbourne, was privatized in 1996. SAS Trustee Corporation (STC) and Linx Cargo Care Group jointly own 50% of the company.

=== Pedersen Group ===
On 24 August 2018, Linx Cargo Care Group and its subsidiary C3 purchased Pedersen Group, a provider of wood chipping and wood yard management services to pulp and paper mills and forest owners in Australia and New Zealand.

=== Enfield Intermodal Terminal ===
On 20 February 2018, Linx Cargo Care Group purchased the Enfield Intermodal Terminal from Aurizon in Western Sydneyl.

In March 2018, Linx assisted in the construction of a freight hub on the property around the Enfield Intermodal Terminal by collaborating with NSW Ports and the Goodman Group. After purchasing two G class locomotives and 34 container wagons from Aurizon, Linx started running rail services on 2 April from Port Botany via the Enfield Intermodal Terminal to Toll Holdings' Carrington terminal..

In February 2022, Linx was potentially to start operating a service from Bairnsdale to Melbourne via the Gippsland railway line service for Fenning Timbers, with rumours that their two G class would be transferred from Sydney.
