= Inter Pipeline =

Canadian pipeline operator

Inter Pipeline Ltd.
- Industry: Petroleum industry Pipeline transport Storage
- Founded: November 27, 1997
- Headquarters: Calgary, Canada
- Products: ethane, butane, natural gas
- Revenue: ▼$2.5 billion (2019) $2.6 billion (2018)
- Operating income: $396.41 mil 2012▲23.9
- Net income: ▼$539 million (2019) $592 million (2018)
- Total assets: $5.5902 billion 2012▲25.0%
- Total equity: $1.659.5 billion 2012▲25.7%
- Number of employees: 1,083 (2026)
- Parent: Brookfield Infrastructure Partners
- Divisions: Inter Terminals Limited (formerly Simon Storage Limited)
- Website: www.interpipeline.com

Inter Pipeline Ltd. is a multinational petroleum (oil, natural gas and petrochemical products) transportation and infrastructure limited partnership that is ranked among North America's leading natural gas and NGL's extraction businesses (from its liquids (NGL's) counterpart). It is one of Alberta's top 100 companies in terms of profit (85) and assets (94).

It is the biggest transporter of oil sands' bitumen (over 1 million bbls/d after the Cold Lake oil sands upgrade) and in 2010 it was Alberta's 23rd fastest growing business. Soon after the millennium, the energy infrastructure business was divided into 4 segments: conventional oil pipelines, natural gas extraction, liquid storage and oilsands transportation. Major companies such as Encana, Canadian Natural Resources, Shell Canada, Chevron, Marathon Oil and Imperial Oil rely on the pipelines for transportation of oil to refineries and distribution to markets.

In 2010, other Canadian trusts/funds converted to corporation's but Inter Pipeline's board of directors decided against it citing costs, a lack of tax benefits, and the market response to other companies that converted.

Overseas it operated in the UK, Ireland, Denmark, Germany, Sweden and The Netherlands via its subsidiary Inter Terminals Limited (formerly Simon Storage Limited). These subsidiaries, apart from the Denmark and Sweden operations, were sold to Spanish company CLH in late 2020, a bulk liquid storage business.

== History ==
Inter Pipeline's origins go back to 1997 to Koch Industries a refiner out of which sprang two pipelines one of which formed Koch Pipelines Canada, a conventional oil pipeline transportation company that Inter Pipeline directly traces its roots to. Within the next year it went public on the Toronto Stock Exchange listing under the symbol KPC.UN.

- In 2000 it purchased a 15% interest in the Cold Lake pipeline system which it later increased to a controlling stake through a deal with Encana.
- In early 2003 it purchased a 70% interest in the Cold Lake Pipeline system from Encana for $425 million giving it access to transportation hubs in major cities like Edmonton.
- In 2004 it paid Williams Companies US$540 million for 3 of Canada's biggest natural gas treatment plants (which processed a combined 3.9 billion ft^{3} per day). That move gave it direct access to gas supplies from the Mackenzie Delta.
- In 2005 Inter Pipeline entered the European bulk liquid storage market by buying Simon Storage, the UK's biggest terminal operator for C$250 million.
- In 2006 annual revenue reached $1 billion after the $38 million takeover of German storage company Tanklager-Gesellschaft Hoyer mbH (TLG)
- It entered the oilsands in March 2007 when it acquired the Corridor Pipeline from Houston-based Kinder Morgan for C$275 million in cash and C$485 million in debt; the deal gave Inter Pipeline the infrastructure used to transport about 30% of the oilsands output (including the 85% interest it had in Cold Lake it is 50%) but also left it with a $1.8 billion infrastructure expansion commitment). A decision by Enbridge and Inter Pipeline to move their pipelines east of the Labiche River helped to reduce the environmental impact and risk associated with the pipelines.
- In 2018 Inter Pipeline Ltd. acquired NuStar Energy L.P.'s European bulk liquid storage business ("NuStar Europe") for cash consideration of US$270 million.
- In August 2019 Inter Pipeline Ltd. announced that it was exploring the sale of its European bulk liquid storage business.
- In August 2019 Inter Pipeline Ltd. confirmed that it received a "proposal" unsolicited take-over bid to purchase the company, after trading in its stock was halted by the market regulator. In September 2019, it was disclosed that Li Ka-shing was the author of the rejected $12.4 billion proposal.
- In March 2021, the board of directors at Inter Pipeline Ltd. unanimously rejected a hostile takeover offer by Brookfield Infrastructure Partners LP. After raising its bid, Brookfield completed its acquisition of Inter Pipeline in November.

== Operations ==
The business segments are:

- Cold Lake - the transportation system sends oil from Cold Lake to Edmonton and Hardisty Alberta. Much of the expansion happened in 2008 when its capacity increased from a 330,000 bbl/d to 560,000 bbl/d. Between it and Corridor there are 1,900 km of pipeline.
- Corridor Pipeline - offers services related to oil sands storage and transport.
- Bulk Liquid Storage - The Inter Terminals business (headquartered in Redhill, Surrey, in the UK), is a bulk liquid storage provider with more than 5.8 million cubic metres of storage capacity (approximately 37 million barrels) located across 23 terminals in the UK, Eire, Denmark, Germany, Sweden and The Netherlands.
- Conventional Oil Pipelines - The Bow River, Central Alberta and Mid-Saskatchewan pipeline systems which transport almost 200,000 bbls/d to locations in Alberta and Saskatchewan.
- NGL Extraction - Includes 2 wholly owned plus a 50% owned natural gas processing facilities. At the NGL's processing plants natural gas is separated from associated liquids which contain valuable ethane and a mix of propane, butane and pentane. The liquids components have a variety of uses ranging from asphalt to lubricants.
