= Plantation Pipe Line Company =

Plantation pipeline (KMI) 18.28 5-10-21

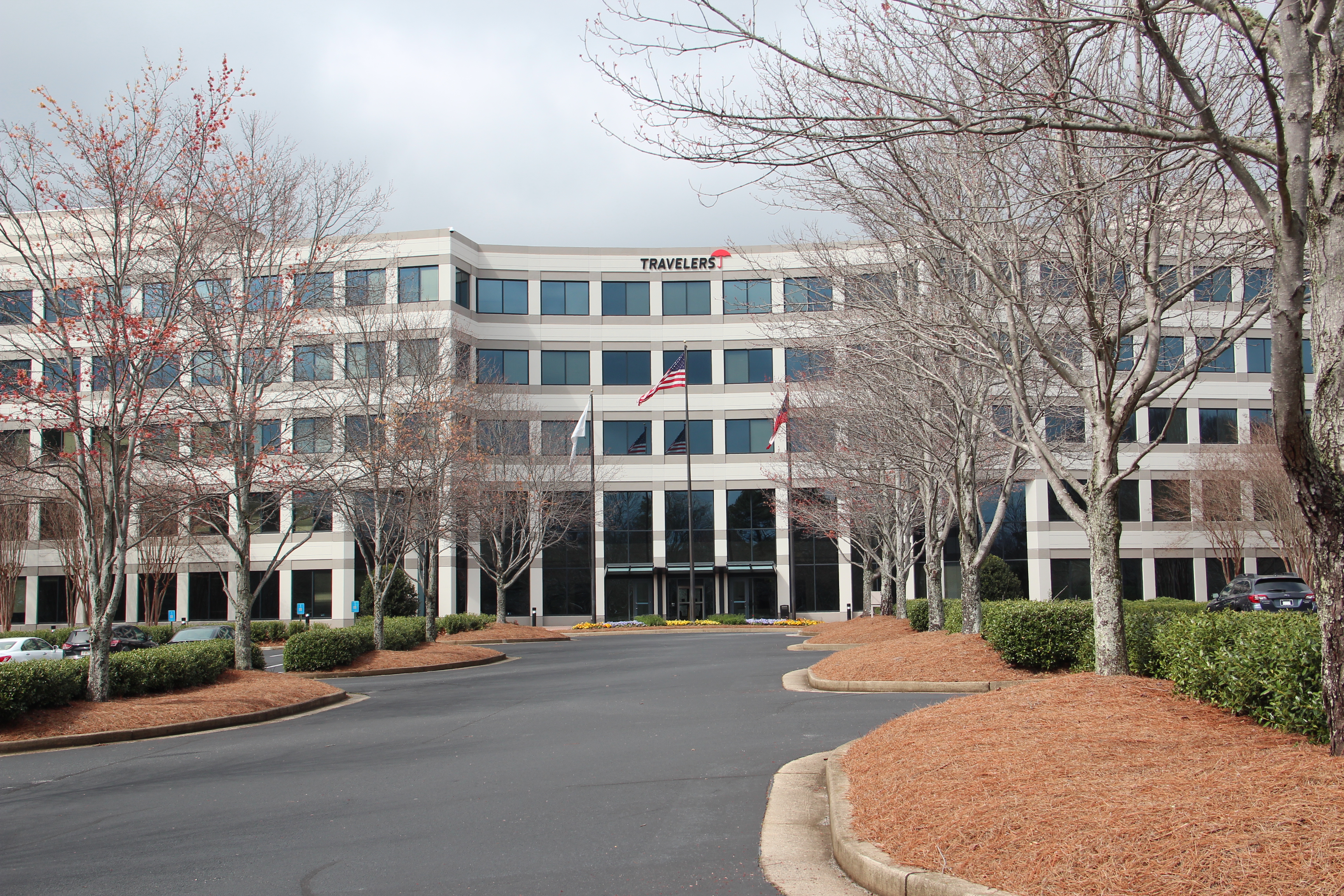
Plantation Pipeline headquarters in Alpharetta, Georgia

The Plantation Pipe Line Company is an American oil pipeline company. Headquartered in Alpharetta, Georgia, the company delivers refined petroleum products to communities and businesses throughout the South and parts of the Eastern United States. The company is owned by a partnership between Exxon and the pipeline operator Kinder Morgan. Plantation consists of 3,100 miles of pipeline, originating at Baton Rouge, Louisiana, and terminating near Washington D.C. The pipeline travels through the coastal states of Louisiana, Mississippi, Alabama, Georgia, South Carolina, North Carolina, Virginia, and Maryland. A branch from the main pipeline also reaches into Tennessee. Much of the pipeline route parallels the path of Colonial Pipeline and many terminals along the route can receive products from either pipeline. Major metropolitan markets served by Plantation include: Birmingham, Atlanta, Chattanooga, Knoxville, Greenville/Spartanburg, Charlotte, Greensboro, Roanoke, Richmond, and Washington.

== History ==
=== 1940 ===
Several major oil companies began discussing a Gulf Coast-to-East Coast pipeline in 1940.

=== 1942 ===
Plantation began operation. Initial construction costs were $20,000,000.

=== 1943 ===
A 180-mile extension of Plantation was built from Greensboro to Richmond, Virginia.

=== 1964 ===
A 120-mile extension of Plantation was built from Richmond, Virginia to Alexandria, Virginia.
