= Columbia Gas Transmission =

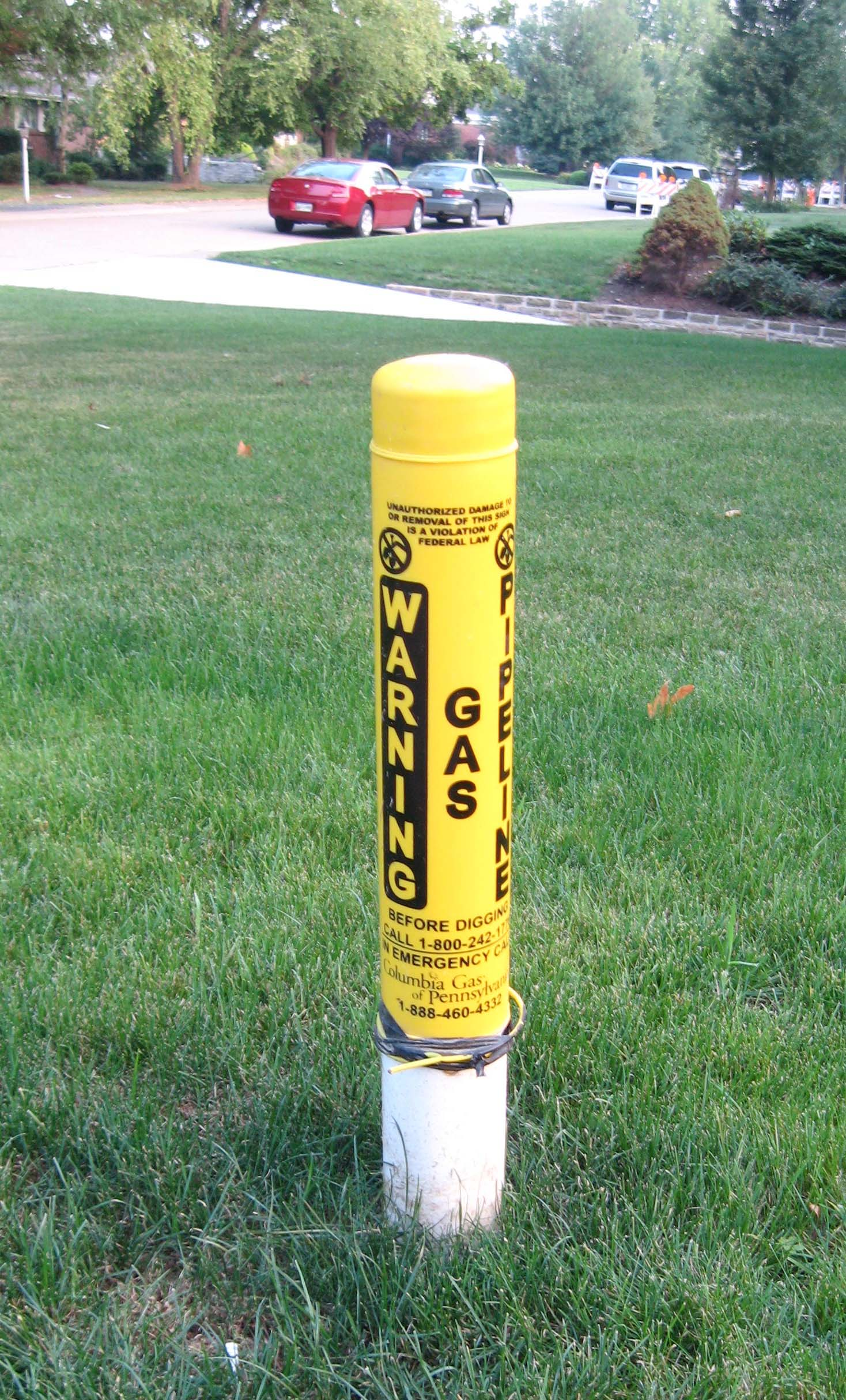
A warning marker indicating an underground gas line

Columbia Gas Transmission is a natural gas pipeline that gathers gas in the Gulf of Mexico and transports it to New York. Its pipelines are in Pennsylvania, New Jersey, Maryland, Ohio, Virginia and West Virginia. It is owned by TransCanada Corporation. Its FERC code is 21.

== See also ==
- List of North American natural gas pipelines
