= List of pipeline accidents in the United States in the 2010s =

The following is a list of pipeline accidents in the United States in the 2010s. It is one of several lists of U.S. pipeline accidents. See also list of natural gas and oil production accidents in the United States.

== Incidents ==
This is not a complete list of all pipeline accidents. For natural gas alone, the Pipeline and Hazardous Materials Safety Administration (PHMSA), a United States Department of Transportation agency, has collected data on more than 3,200 accidents deemed serious or significant since 1987.

A "significant incident" results in any of the following consequences:

- fatality or injury requiring in-patient hospitalization
- $50,000 or more in total costs, measured in 1984 dollars
- liquid releases of five or more barrels (42 US gal/barrel)
- releases resulting in an unintentional fire or explosion

PHMSA and the National Transportation Safety Board (NTSB) post incident data and results of investigations into accidents involving pipelines that carry a variety of products, including natural gas, oil, diesel fuel, gasoline, kerosene, jet fuel, carbon dioxide, and other substances. Occasionally pipelines are repurposed to carry different products.

=== 2010 ===
==== January ====
- January 2 – Enbridge's Line 2 ruptured near Neche, North Dakota, releasing about 3,784 barrels of crude oil, of which 2,237 barrels were recovered. The cause was a material defect.
- January 7 – A gas pipeline exploded near Barksdale Air Force Base, Louisiana, killing a pipeline employee.

==== February ====
- February 1 – A plumber trying to unclog a sewer line in St. Paul, Minnesota ruptured a gas service line that has been "cross bored" through the house's sewer line. The plumber and resident escaped the house moments before as an explosion and following fire destroyed the house. The Minnesota Office of Pipeline Safety ordered that gas utility, Xcel, to check for more cross bored gas lines. In the following year, 25,000 sewer lines inspected showed 57 other cross bored gas lines. In Louisville, Kentucky, 430 gas line cross bores were found in 200 miles (320 km) of a sewer project, including some near schools and a hospital. The NTSB had cited such cross bore incidents as a known hazard since 1976.
- February 7 – A power plant explosion occurred at the Kleen Energy Systems, killing 5 and injuring a dozen.
- February 25 – A natural gas liquids (NGL) pipeline ruptured near Pond Creek, Oklahoma, releasing over 575,000 US gallons (2,180,000 L) of NGL's, and forcing road closures. There was no fire.

==== March ====
- March 1 – At about 8:10 am, Mid-Valley Pipeline identified a release of crude oil in the manifold area of the Mid-Valley tank farm in Longview, Texas. Crude oil was observed "gushing" from the soil in the manifold area. About 198 barrels of crude oil were estimated to have been released and 196 barrels were recovered from the secondary containment area within Mid-Valley's site.
- March 2 – Reno County 911 dispatch was notified about a natural gas leak in a 26-inch diameter interstate pipeline at Red Rock Road and Andre Road near Abbyville, Kansas. Twenty people were evacuated as a precaution. The leak was caused by a ruptured girth weld in the pipe owned by Southern Star Central Gas Pipeline. The pipe was manufactured in 1967.
- March 15 – A 24-inch gas pipeline burst, but did not ignite near Pampa, Texas.
- March 25 – There was a release of 1700 barrels of Vacuum gas oil (VGO) from the FM-1 pipeline into an open in-ground valve pit and the surrounding area in the West Yard of the Sunoco, R&M Philadelphia refinery in Philadelphia, Pennsylvania. The area was under the control of the Operator in a fenced off area that is off-limits to the public.

==== April ====
- April 5 – A crude oil pipeline ruptured near Green River, Wyoming. At least 84,000 US gallons (320,000 L) of crude were spilled. Corrosion in the pipeline was the cause.
- April 13 – A flash fire occurred as a result of incorrect operations while operator and contract employees were conducting planned maintenance at the Seymour Terminal of the Enterprise Products Operating Company, LLC(EPCO) located in Jackson County, Indiana. Two EPCO employees and two contract employees were injured.
- April 14 – At an Enogex natural gas compressor station in Bennington, Oklahoma, during construction tie-ins related to an expansion project, a contract employee was injured as a result of a flash fire which immediately extinguished itself. The contract employee's injuries required in-patient hospitalization. The cause of the accident was, in part, miscommunication between two crews working in the station at the same time.
- April 23 – A pipeline ruptured near Niles, Kansas, due to previous excavation damage. About 1,659 barrels of natural gasoline were lost.

==== May ====
- May 10 – In Swifton, Arkansas, a Mississippi River Transmission Corporation employee arrived at the Swifton M&R station and found the regulator engulfed in flames, evidently from a direct hit by a lightning strike which perforated the equipment.
- May 29 – An Amoco pipeline leaked nearly 89,000 gallons of gasoline into a farm field along Quarterline Road. The leak occurred in Constantine Township, St. Joseph County, Michigan. The cause was from a manufacturing defect in the pipe.

==== June ====
- June 7 – A 36-inch Enterprise natural gas pipeline leaked, exploded and started a fire in Johnson County, Texas when it was disturbed by workers installing poles for electrical lines. The mapping of subsurface utilities was inadequate, leading to inaccurate maps. Confusion over the location and status of the construction work led to the pipeline not being marked beforehand. These inaccuracies led to a miscommunication between the locator and the excavator, As a result, one worker was killed and seven were injured. The pipe was manufactured and installed in 1970.
- June 8 – Construction workers hit an unmarked 14-inch gas gathering pipeline near Darrouzett, Texas. Two workers were killed, and 3 others injured.
- June 12 – Red Butte Creek oil spill: A Chevron crude oil pipeline was damaged by lightning and ruptured, causing 800 barrels (130 m^{3}) of crude to spill into Red Butte Creek in Salt Lake City, Utah. Crude then flowed into a pond in Liberty Park.

==== July ====
- July 5 – A landowner operating a bulldozer hit an 8-inch LPG/propane pipeline near Thomson, Georgia. Later, the propane fumes ignited, killing the adult son of the landowner, and igniting fires that destroyed a trailer house and woodlands.
- July 26 – The Kalamazoo River oil spill: Enbridge Energy Partners LLP (Enbridge), reported that a 30-inch (760 mm) pipeline belonging to Enbridge burst in Marshall, Michigan. Enbridge had numerous alarms from the affected Line 6B, but controllers thought the alarms were from phase separation, and the leak was not reported to Enbridge for 17 hours. Enbridge estimates over 800,000 US gallons (3,000,000 L) of crude oil leaked into Talmadge Creek, a waterway that feeds the Kalamazoo River, whereas EPA reports over 1,139,569 gallons of oil have been recovered as of November 2011. On July 27, 2010, an Administrative Order was issued by U.S. EPA requiring the performance of removal actions in connection with the facility. The Order requires Enbridge to immediately conduct removal of a discharge or to mitigate or prevent a substantial threat of a discharge of oil and to submit a Work Plan for the cleanup activities that was to include a Health and Safety Plan, as required by 29 CFR 1910.120 (HAZWOPER). In 2012, the NTSB later cited known but unrepaired cracks and external corrosion as the cause.

==== August ====
- August 10 – The U.S. Environmental Protection Agency (EPA) and the Justice Department announced that Plains All American Pipeline and several of its operating subsidiaries have agreed to spend approximately $41 million to upgrade 10,420 miles (16,770 km) of crude oil pipeline operated in the United States. The settlement resolves Plains' Clean Water Act violations for ten crude oil spills in Texas, Louisiana, Oklahoma, and Kansas, and requires the company to pay a $3.25 million civil penalty.
- August 17 – Smell from a mixture of gasoline and diesel fuel were detected in Hammond, Indiana. The source was from a leaking Amoco/BP pipeline in the area, and about 38,000 gallons of the mixture was released. About 5,000 gallons of the spillage was not recovered. The cause was external corrosion to the pipeline.
- August 24 – A gas compressor station explosion in Shongaloo, Louisiana injured one worker.
- August 25 – A construction crew installing a gas pipeline in Roberts County, Texas hit an unmarked pipeline, seriously burning one man.
- August 27 – An LPG pipeline leaked in Gilboa, New York, forcing the evacuation of 23 people. The cause was stress corrosion cracking. There were no injuries or ignition.

==== September ====
- September 9
  - San Bruno pipeline explosion: A 30-inch diameter high pressure natural gas pipeline exploded in San Bruno, California, a suburb of San Francisco. The blast destroyed 38 homes and damaged 120 more. More than a hundred people were evacuated. Eight died and at least 50 were injured. Ten acres of brush also burned. Later, PG&E was unable to supply the California Public Utilities Commission with documents on how PG&E established pressure limits on some of its gas transmission pipelines. It was also revealed that this pipeline had 26 leaks between Milpitas and San Francisco during the time of 1951 to 2009, with some of the leak causes listed in records as "unknown". Later hydrostatic testing of the pipeline that failed found a pinhole leak, and a previously damaged section blew out. The pipe was manufactured in 1949.
  - A 20-inch diameter Columbia Gas Transmission Company pipeline failed in Lawrence County, Kentucky. While there was no fire or evacuations, the condition of this uncoated, non-cathodic protected, unknown grade pipeline caused PHMSA to enter into a Consent Order to eventually replace this pipeline.
- September 28 – A repair crew was working on a corroded gas pipe in Cairo, Georgia, when the line exploded. One crew member was killed, and three others burned.

==== October ====
- October 11 – Equipment failure on Centurion Pipeline caused it to fail in Levelland, Texas, releasing about 428,000 gallons of crude oil.
- October 15 – A natural gas pipeline under construction in Grand Prairie, Texas was running a cleaning pig without a pig "trap" at the end of the pipe. The 150 pound pig was expelled from the pipeline with enough force to fly 500 feet (150 m), and crash through the side of a house. No one was injured.

==== November ====
- November 8 – Near Tioga, North Dakota, Aevenia Energy contracted to plow electrical cables underground from an oil well location owned by Amerada Hess Corporation across a wheat field to a power pole. The crew consisted of two bulldozer operators and one employee walking near the plow. Plowing started at the oil well location and had gone about 260 feet when it struck a Williston Basin Interstate Pipeline Company natural gas transmission line. The 8-inch diameter pipeline, operating at approximately 650 psig, failed after being struck by the plow, killing the person who was standing on the ground near the rupture. The two bulldozer operators jumped off their equipment and ran from the escaping gas. The force of the jetting gas blew the person on the ground 80 feet. None of the parties made a one-call notification prior to the start of the project. Two pipeline marker posts were visible from the access road into the site; the closest about 517 feet south of the rupture.
- November 12 – Three men working on natural gas lines were injured when a pipeline ruptured in Monroe, Louisiana.
- November 30 – A Tennessee Gas Pipeline 30-inch diameter gas pipeline failed at Natchitoches, Louisiana. There was no fire, but the pipe, which was manufactured in 1948, had a Magnetic Flux smart pig test earlier in the year that indicated no flaws. The failure was at a crack in a wrinkle bend which may have been stressed by shifting soil. The deadly 1965 gas pipeline accident had occurred on a different pipeline owned by the same company nearby.

==== December ====
- December 1 – A valve on a crude oil pipeline leaked about 500 barrels (79 m^{3}) of crude in Salt Lake City, Utah. This failure was only 100 yards from a June 2010 failure on the same pipeline.
- December 2 – A pipeline was discovered leaking gasoline near Livingston, Illinois.
- December 8 – In East Bernard, Texas, a 24-inch diameter Tennessee Gas Pipeline exploded, blasting a 12-foot section of ruptured pipe 295 feet and caused $715,000 in property damage. It took 6 hours for the pipe system to blow down. The cause of the leak was a full guillotine failure of the pipe caused by internal corrosion micro-biologically induced due to moisture in the pipe. The pipe was manufactured in 1948.
- December 13 - A discharge of crude oil originating from a 12-inch pipeline, in Lockport, Illinois. Around 78,000 gallons of crude oil were released into a drainage ditch, which then flowed into a wetland area nearby. In 2021, the companies involved agreed to pay $8.7 million for damage claims
- December 17 – A gas line fire and explosion just outside Corpus Christi, Texas city limits left one person critically injured. A man was working on removing an abandoned pipeline when it exploded, and his face was severely burned.
- December 21 – A crude oil pipeline was discovered leaking into the Dominguez Channel in the Port of Los Angeles. Over 1,000 gallons of crude oil was recovered, but the pipeline company was alleged to have failed to report the spill to State or Federal pipeline authorities. A 61 count criminal complaint was later filed in this accident.
- December 24 – A mechanical failure at a Texas Gas Transmission compressor station near Youngsville, Louisiana, caused a gas leak that ignited and exploded in the middle of the night. The Texas Gas gas control center received alarms indicating fire, vibration, and emergency shutdown alarms were activated. The fire department and state police secured the site. Once cleared by the fire chief on site, Texas Gas personnel assessed the damage. The cause of the incident was compressor component malfunction. The metallurgical report determined that six of eight engine bolts failed due to high cycle fatigue. The equipment has been installed in 1965.
- December 28 – A pipeline at an underground gas storage facility in Covington County, Mississippi leaked, forcing the evacuation of about two dozen families for over a week.

=== 2011 ===
==== January ====
- January 11 – Personnel from Millennium Pipeline noticed that a gas transmission pipeline was leaking in Tioga County, New York. This 30-inch diameter pipeline was built in 2008. A pinhole in a rejected girth weld was found to be the cause of the failure. It appears that during the course of the construction project for the line, the subject pipe section was inadvertently picked up and subsequently installed in the pipeline. PHMSA ordered testing of this pipeline for similar flaws.
- January 18 – A 12-inch cast iron gas main leaking in Philadelphia exploded, killing a repair crew member and injuring six others.
- January 19 - A line balance issue was found on a 10 inch Sunoco crude oil pipeline, caused by a leak near Maysville, Oklahoma. About 52,000 gallons of crude was spilled, and the cause was due to internal corrosion of the pipeline.
- January 24 – Multiple gas pressure regulators failed, and caused a gas pressure surge in Fairport Harbor, Ohio, causing gas fires in 11 houses, and one apartment. 150 gas appliances were damaged or destroyed, but there were no injuries. Gas company Dominion East Ohio says it found fluids and debris in a failed regulator. A year after the explosion, the Public Utilities Commission of Ohio recommended a $500,000 fine for Dominion.

==== February ====
- February 9 – Five people were killed, and eight houses were destroyed, in a gas explosion and fire in Allentown, Pennsylvania. The NTSB had warned UGI about cast iron gas mains needing replacement after the 1990 gas explosion in that city. Between 1976 and the date of the letter, July 10, 1992, two more gas explosions occurred. Three people were killed, 23 injured and 11 houses were destroyed or damaged in those explosions. UGI was cited in 2012 for several safety violations, including a lack of valves on their gas system.
- February 10 – Late on that day, a Tennessee Gas Pipeline 36-inch gas transmission pipeline exploded and burned near Lisbon, Ohio. No injuries resulted. The cause was from stress on a girth weld on the pipeline. A failure on another girth weld on the pipeline system led to a PHMSA Consent Agreement.
- February 24 – Early on that day, a pipeline near Texas City, Texas ruptured, sending up to 5,000 US gallons (19,000 L) of gasoline into Bayou Pierre.

==== March ====
- March 1 – A Tennessee Gas Pipeline gas transmission pipeline failed near Cumberland, Ohio. A material or weld defect was the cause.
- March 17 – Early on that day, a 20-inch steel CenterPoint Energy natural gas line running through a Minneapolis, Minnesota neighborhood ruptured, and gas from it ignited, caused evacuations to buildings nearby, and Interstate 35W was closed from downtown Minneapolis to Highway 62. There were no injuries. The Minnesota Office of Pipeline Safety later found the pipe there was not designed to handle the load of soil and passing cars, and efforts to shore up the pipeline were incorrectly carried out.

==== April ====
- April 13 – A farmer and rancher near White Oak Township, Michigan smelled gasoline on April 13, and discovered gasoline from a products pipeline leaking into a drainage ditch. As of late September, an estimated 460,000 gallons of gasoline had been released, with about 111,000 gallons of it recovered.

==== May ====
- May 5 - A woman was engulfed in flames after the blade of the mower she was operating came into contact with an exposed high pressure gas pipeline, in Kentucky. She later died.
- May 7 – A threaded connection failed on a Keystone Pipeline pump at a station in Sargent County, North Dakota, spilling about 400 barrels of crude oil. Due to a number of other leaks on this pipeline system, Keystone's owner, TransCanada Corporation, was given a Corrective Action Order by PHMSA.
- May 14 – An 8-inch NGL pipeline failed in Romeoville, Illinois, leaking about 4200 gallons of butane. Corrosion inside a casing under a road was the cause of the failure. Corrosion only 2.5 feet from the failure had been seen by a smart pig run in 2007, but was not within action limits at the time.
- May 19 – A 10-inch crude oil pipeline ruptured near Maysville, Oklahoma. Over 42,000 US gallons (160,000 L) of crude were lost. There was no fire. Internal pipeline corrosion was the cause.

==== July ====
- July 1
  - A 2-inch lateral on a crude oil pipeline ruptured in Huntington Beach, California. A major road, Goldenwest Street, had to be closed for cleaning and pipeline repairs.
  - Late on that day, a 12-inch Exxon Mobil crude oil pipeline. also known as the Silvertip Pipeline, ruptured, and spilled about 63,000 gallons of oil into the Yellowstone River in south-central Montana. There was confusion in the pipeline control room, causing a delayed pipeline shutdown. Some residents of Laurel, Montana had to be evacuated. The break near Billings fouled the riverbank and forced municipalities and irrigation districts to close intakes. Exxon later increased the spill size estimate to 1500 barrels in January 2012 after seeing the damage to the pipeline. About 140 people were evacuated starting about 12:15 a.m. Saturday due to concerns about possible explosions and the overpowering fumes. All were allowed to return after instruments showed petroleum odors had decreased, although no information was available regarding the concentrations of benzene in air. Speculation involves high water flow in the Yellowstone River may have scoured the river bed and exposed the pipe. Consequently, with three oil refineries located in the Billings area, the fire chief for the city of Laurel said he asked all three to turn off the flow of oil in their pipelines under the river after the leak was reported. Exxon Mobil and Cenex Harvest Refinery did so, and Conoco Phillips said that its pipe was already shutdown. Cenex had a release into the Yellowstone River in September 2002. Exxon Mobil later announced the cleanup would cost $135 million. In 2015, Exxon Mobil was fined $1 million by PHMSA for this incident.
- July 20 – A six-month-old, 30-inch natural gas pipeline exploded near Gillette, Wyoming, creating a 60-foot (18 m) crater. There was no fire, nor any injuries. Construction or installation issues caused the failure.
- July 22 – A pipeline carrying jet fuel ruptured in Mango, Florida. About 31,500 US gallons (119,000 L) of fuel spilled. There was no fire or injuries.

==== August ====
- August 13 – An 8-inch NGL pipeline ruptured near Onawa, Iowa at a Missouri River crossing, during flooding conditions. About 818 barrels of Natural Gasoline was lost. There were no evacuations or injuries, but two other pipelines in the same right of way were forced to shut down.
- August 17 – Kinder Morgan's Natural Gas Pipeline Company of America had a flash fire and explosion at a plant south of Herscher, Illinois. Five employees went to the hospital. Kinder Morgan was later cited for pipeline and workplace safety violations.
- August 31
  - A pipeline carrying heating oil was hit by construction workers in East Providence, Rhode Island on August 31, spraying oil on roofs, trees, and pavement, and flowed into storm drains. At least 56,000 US gallons (210,000 L) of oil were spilled.
  - A Cupertino, California condominium was gutted after a plastic pipeline fitting cracked, filling the garage with natural gas that exploded just minutes after the owner left for lunch. PG&E later found six other plastic pipe failures near the blast site. The line was an especially problematic type of pipe manufactured by DuPont called Aldyl-A. PG&E has 1,231 miles (1,981 km) of the early-1970s-vintage pipe in its system. Federal regulators singled out pre-1973 Aldyl-A starting in 2002 as being at risk of failing because of premature cracking. Explosions caused by failed Aldyl-A and other types of plastic pipe have killed more than 50 people in the United States since 1971, the federal government says.

==== September ====
- September – A 12.75 inch crude oil pipeline developed a leak under the Red River, in Temple, Oklahoma.
- September 8 – A 10-inch LPG pipeline failed in Mitchell County, Texas. The escaping gas ignited, starting a small brush fire. The cause of the failure was a crack in the weld of a repair sleeve from bending and heat hardening. About 546,000 gallons of LPG burned. There were no injuries.
- September 18 – A house explosion and fire in Dallas, Texas was caused by a leaking gas main. 3 people were injured.
- September 20 – A farmer, digging to lay drainage tile, hit a 10-inch gasoline pipeline, near Aurelius, New York, spilling about 3,300 US gallons (12 m^{3}) of gasoline. There was no fire or injuries.

==== October ====
- October 12 – A 2-inch crude oil gathering pipeline failed in Oklahoma, spilling about 120 barrels of oil. There were no injuries or fire from the failure.

==== November ====
- November 3 – Early on that day, an explosion and fire hit a gas Columbia Gas Transmission pipeline compressor station at Artemas in Mann Township, Pennsylvania. There were no injuries. The cause was internal corrosion.
- November 8 – A contractor for Vectren Corp. working on a bare gas main replacement project broke a "short stub" on the main, then failed to notify New Albany, Indiana authorities about the leak. Gas migrated through the soil, and built up in a nearby house, then exploded. Five people had to be hospitalized.
- November 12 – A crew working on a waterline hit a gas distribution pipeline in Fairborn, Ohio, leading to a gas explosion that killed one man, and injured five others, including children.
- November 13 – In the evening, a release of nearly 1798,000 gallons of diesel fuel occurred at the Belle Fourche Pipeline Company’s Davis Station in a remote area of Wyoming. The cause was from pumping against a closed valve on the pipeline.
- November 16 – A Tennessee Gas Pipeline 36-inch gas transmission pipeline exploded and burned near Glouster, Ohio. Two people were injured, with three houses and a barn destroyed, and another barn damaged. The pipeline failed at a girth weld, with landsliding causing more stress on the weld.
- November 21 – Late on that day, a Tennessee Gas Pipeline 24-inch gas transmission pipeline exploded and burned near Batesville, Mississippi. Twenty houses were evacuated for a time, but there were no injuries or major property damage. The pipeline failed at a sleeve over a wrinkle bend installed in 1946.

==== December ====
- December 3 – A Williams Companies gas transmission pipeline exploded and burned in Marengo County, Alabama. A 47-foot section of the pipe was hurled more than 200 feet from the failure area. The gas burned for several hours, and a nearby pipeline was damaged. There were no injuries, or serious property damage. External corrosion was the cause of the failure, due to issues with the pipeline coating, the cathodic protection level, and the local soil corrosiveness.
- December 6 – Explosions and fire erupted at a natural gas pipeline compressor station in Sublette County, Wyoming. Two workers were injured.
- December 10
  - A landowner using a bulldozer hit an 8-inch and a 12-inch petroleum pipelines near Nemaha, Nebraska, rupturing both lines. The spill size was estimated to be 119,000 gallons of gasoline, jet fuel, and diesel fuel. Some of the fuel flowed into a creek leading into Jasper Creek. There were questions about the depth of soil coverage for this pipeline.
  - A 42-inch natural gas transmission pipeline failed and ignited at a valve in Cache County, Utah.
- December 27 – Controllers for Enterprise Products received an alarm for a leak on an LPG pipeline. The leak location was found in Loving County, Texas. Repair crew excavated the area, and found a full girth weld failure. During the pipeline repair, a flash fire involving residual pipeline product in the soil occurred, injuring 3 employees, one of whom required in-patient hospitalization. The rupture was attributed to the complete circumferential separation of an acetylene girth weld dating to 1928, and the flash fire was attributed to operator error.

=== 2012 ===
==== January ====
- January 2 – In the evening, a 30-inch gas pipeline exploded and burned, in Estill County, Kentucky. The rupture created a crater approximately 86 feet long by 22 feet wide, and expelled a number of pieces of pipe as far as 800 feet from the rupture center. Flames were reported reaching over 1,000 feet high. Residents up to a mile away from the failure were evacuated. There were no injuries. The cause was overstress from land movement.
- January 7 – A forest fire caused a gas pipeline to explode and burn in Floyd County, Kentucky. There were no injuries from this incident.
- January 9 – A man was killed, and another person injured, in a fiery house explosion from a leaking 4-inch cast iron gas main installed in 1950 in Austin, Texas. Gas had been smelled in the area for several weeks prior to this. Gas company crews had looked along the affected property for a leak, but were unable to find it.
- January 12 – Late on that day, a Sunoco pipeline ruptured and spilled about 117,000 gallons of gasoline, in Wellington, Ohio. Some residents were evacuated for a week.
- January 13 – An 8-inch gas pipeline exploded and burned, in a vacant agricultural field, in Rio Vista, California. There were no injuries or evacuations.
- January 14 – A Tennessee Gas Pipeline gas compressor had a major leak "that sounded like a rocket" in Powell County, Kentucky, forcing evacuations of nearby residents. There was no fire or injuries reported.
- January 16 – A contractor excavating for a communications company caused a massive gas explosion and fire at a condominium complex on January 16 in West Haverstraw, New York, injuring two firefighters and two utility workers. Afterwards, it was found that the excavator's insurance will be insufficient to cover all of the property damage of the incident.
- January 18 – The original Colonial Pipeline mainline failed in Belton, South Carolina, spilling about 13,500 gallons of petroleum product. The failure was caused by internal corrosion.
- January 30 – Workers in Topeka, Kansas were installing a yard sprinkler system when they hit a gas line. Gas from the leak later on exploded in a nearby house, burning a 73-year-old woman, who died several weeks later.
- January 31 – A Shell Oil Company fuel pipeline to the Milwaukee, Wisconsin Mitchell International Airport was found to be leaking. Jet fuel had been smelled for about two weeks in the area, and was found in runoff water in the area. The cause was from external corrosion. About 9,000 gallons of fuel were spilled. In 2014, a Shell employee was scheduled to plead guilty to charges of falsifying records of the pipeline.

==== February ====
- February 13 – A Florida Gas Transmission Company 30-inch gas transmission pipeline burst near Baton Rouge, Louisiana. Residents in the area were evacuated for a time, but there was no fire. The pipe, manufactured in 1965, ruptured due to external corrosion. DOT/PHMSA assessed a fine of $197,200 against FGT for 2 violations of safety regulations on corrosion control and issued a corrective order.
- February 15 – In Arenac County, Michigan, oil was discovered in the soil around a 30-inch Enbridge crude oil pipeline. About 800 gallons of crude oil were spilled.

==== March ====
- March 3 – Two cars that were drag racing went off the road and crashed through a fence and into a crude oil pipeline in New Lenox, Illinois. The pipeline was ruptured, and the crude oil ignited. Two men from the vehicles were killed, and three others seriously burned.
- March 5 – A leak at an Enid, Oklahoma pipeline storage facility spread propane fumes in the area, forcing evacuations. There was no fire or explosion.
- March 17 – A crude oil pipeline leaked near Grand Isle, Louisiana, spilling as much as 8,400 gallons of crude oil. There were no injuries reported.
- March 29 – An employee accidentally left a valve open during maintenance work on a Williams Companies gas compressor station near Springville Township, Pennsylvania. Later, gas leaked through the valve, causing alarms to evacuate workers in the compressor building. Later, the gas exploded and burned. There were no injuries. It was also found there are no agencies enforcing rules on rural gas facilities in that state.

==== April ====
- April 2 – Transcontinental Gas Pipeline Company, reported a leak on their 72nd Street Interstate Transmission Lateral located in North Bergen, New Jersey. Workers discovered a rock in contact with the bottom of the pipe. Upon removing the rock, the pipeline began to leak. There was no fire or injuries reported as a result of this incident.
- April 4 – A 12-inch gas pipeline exploded and burned for five hours near Gary, Texas. There were no injuries, but the rupture site was only 200 feet from that pipeline's compressor station.
- April 6 – Two gas company workers were mildly burned when attempting to fix a leak on a 4-inch gas pipeline in DeSoto County, Mississippi. The pipeline exploded and burned during the repairs.
- April 9 – A Texas Gas Transmission 16-inch diameter natural gas pipeline exploded and burned in Terrebonne Parish, Louisiana. The pipe, manufactured in 1961, failed due to corrosion. The accident was reported first by a satellite monitoring the area to the NRC. There were no injuries.
- April 25 – Two men escaped with only minor burns after a bulldozer they were using hit a 24-inch gas pipeline near Hinton, Iowa. Authorities later announced the men did not call 811 for an underground utility locate.
- April 28 – An ExxonMobil 20/22-inch-diameter pipeline ruptured near Torbert in Pointe Coupee Parish, Louisiana, about 20 miles west of Baton Rouge, and crude oil spilled into the surrounding area, and flowed into an unnamed tributary connected to Bayou Cholpe. About 117,000 gallons of crude were spilled, with about 37,000 gallons being lost. The pipeline failed due to a manufacturing defect.

==== June ====
- June 6 – A 26-inch gas transmission pipeline ruptured in a compressor station near Laketon in northeastern Gray County, Texas. Gas escaped from the 50-foot-long rupture, igniting, leaving a crater 30 feet in diameter, burning two acres of agricultural area and telephone poles. There were no injuries.
- June 8 – Near Canadian, Texas, a trackhoe operator suffered burns, after a fire from a leaking 4-inch gas-gathering pipeline that was undergoing maintenance. Fumes entered the engine of the trackhoe and ignited.
- June 25 – A contractor was killed and two others injured after an explosion at a BP gas compressor station in Durango, Colorado. BP, Halliburton, and the other contractors were fined $7,000 each for safety violations in that work.

==== July ====
- July 17 – A West Shore Pipe Line petroleum products pipeline burst near Jackson, Wisconsin, releasing about 54,000 gallons of gasoline. At least one family self evacuated due to the leak. At least 44 water wells nearby were contaminated from benzine in the gasoline, including a municipal well. A LF-ERW seam failure was suspected as the cause. Further testing revealed that at least 26 other areas on this pipeline needed repairs, with 22 within the Jackson Marsh Wildlife Area.
- July 18 – A 14-inch gas gathering pipeline exploded and burned near Intracoastal City, Louisiana. There were no injuries or major property damage reported.
- July 23 – A compressor station operated by Williams Companies in Windsor, New York was venting gas in a "routine procedure" — during a lightning storm — when the vent was ignited by lightning, causing a fireball "hundreds of feet into the air"
- July 27 - An Enbridge crude oil pipeline ruptured in Grand Marsh, Wisconsin, releasing an estimated 50,000 gallons of crude oil. The pipeline had been installed in 1998. Flaws in the longitudinal welds had been seen during X-ray checks of girth welds.

==== August ====
- August 22 – Four contract workers were injured during a flash fire at a Wyoming gas processing plant.
- August 27 – A jet fuel pipeline near Chicago began leaking. The burst pipeline spilled an estimated 42,000 gallons of jet fuel into a ditch that empties into the Calumet Sag Channel in Palos Heights, Illinois. External corrosion was the cause of the pipeline failure.
- August 28 – An Atmos Energy repair crew struck an 8-inch gas main in McKinney, Texas, causing a fire. Four Atmos workers were treated for injuries. 1,000 Atmos gas customers lost gas service for a time.

==== September ====
- September 6
  - A 10-inch gas gathering pipeline exploded and burned near Alice, Texas. Flames reached 100 feet high, and caused a 10-acre brush fire. There were no injuries.
  - An explosion and fire hit a Crestwood Midstream Partners gas compressor station in Hood County, Texas. Heavy damage to a sheet metal building resulted, but there were no injuries reported to crew there.
- September 11 – A Colorado Interstate Gas gas compressor in Rio Blanco County, Colorado caught fire. There were no reported injuries.
- September 24 – An excavator struck a 4-inch natural gas line on Route 416 in Montgomery, New York. Escaping gas ignited, and it took 90 minutes before the gas was shut off. There were no injuries.

==== October ====
- October 3 – A Colonial Pipeline stubline leaked gasoline into in a marshy area of Moccasin Bend, about 1,000 feet from the Tennessee River, near Chattanooga, Tennessee. About 3,600 gallons of gasoline were spilled, with about 1000 gallons being lost. The cause was from previous excavation damage.

==== November ====
- November 19 – The operator of an excavator machine narrowly escaped serious injury in Lewiston, Idaho on November 19, when his machine hit a gas pipeline during road work. The resulting fire destroyed a railroad signal, along with several telephone poles, and road construction equipment. The depth of the pipeline had been misjudged at that location.
- November 20
  - About 38,000 gallons of crude oil spilled from an Enbridge pipeline at a tank farm in Mokena, Illinois.
  - Two men were injured in an explosion and fire at a natural gas production facility east of Price, Utah.
- November 23 – A gas company worker looking for the source of a reported gas leak in a Springfield, Massachusetts strip club pierced a gas line. The gas later exploded, injuring 21, devastating the strip club, and damaging numerous nearby buildings.
- November 30 – A heavy equipment operator punctured a 12-inch gas transmission pipeline, near the city of Madera, California. The adjacent highway, along with several rural roads, was shut down for hours, while houses and businesses in the area were evacuated.

==== December ====
- December 4 – A malfunction in a gas compressor caused a fire north of Fort Worth, Texas. There were no injuries.
- December 5 – A 16-inch gas pipeline at 500 psi of pressure exploded and burned near a natural gas plant in Goldsmith, Texas. A fireball 250 feet high was created after the explosion, destroying 12 to 15 utility poles, and caliche and rocks the size of bowling balls damaged a road. There were no injuries reported.
- December 11 – At approximately 12:40pm, a 20-inch gas pipeline owned by NiSource Inc., parent of Columbia Gas, exploded along I-77 between Sissonville and Pocatalico, West Virginia. A piece of the pipe twenty feet long was blown out of the ground and had a longitudinal crack that ran the entire twenty feet. The escaping high-pressure natural gas ignited immediately. An area of fire damage about 820 feet wide extended nearly 1,100 feet along the pipeline right-of-way. Three houses were destroyed by the fire, and several other houses were damaged. There were no fatalities or serious injuries. The asphalt pavement of the northbound and southbound lanes of I-77 was heavily damaged by the intense fire. NTSB determined that the probable cause of the pipeline rupture was (1) external corrosion of the pipe wall due to deteriorated coating and ineffective cathodic protection and (2) the failure to detect the corrosion because the pipeline was not inspected or tested after 1988. Contributing to the poor condition of the corrosion protection systems was the rocky backfill used around the buried pipe. Early reports announced the NTSB was investigating as to why alarms in the control room for this pipeline did not sound for this failure. The pipe was manufactured in 1967.
- December 26 – A 20-inch Florida Gas Transmission Company pipeline ruptured near Melbourne, Florida, ejecting a 20-foot section of the pipeline. There was no fire or injuries.

=== 2013 ===
==== January ====
- January 1 – A Colonial Pipeline line was overpressured by improper operation, causing a spill of about 5,500 gallons of petroleum product in Greensboro, North Carolina. About 1,000 gallons of product was not recovered.
- January 15 – A utility crew struck and ruptured a 4-inch gas pipeline in Lewisville, Texas, causing a nearby house to explode later on. The explosion killed a man.

==== February ====
- February 19 – An independent contractor installing fiber-optic cable for a cable company in Kansas City, Missouri inadvertently struck an underground gas line. Gas later caught fire, and created an explosion that destroyed a popular local restaurant, killing one of the workers there, and injuring about 15 others near the scene.

==== March ====
- March 12 – A tug towing a barge struck and ruptured a Chevron LPG pipeline at Bayou Perot, a marshy area on the borders of Jefferson Parish and Lafourche Parish, Louisiana. The tug Captain was severely burned when the escaping gas ignited, and died several weeks later from those injuries.
- March 8 – Pipeline equipment failure resulted in a spill of 6,000 barrels of crude oil, in eastern Columbia County, Arkansas.
- March 18 – A Chevron 8-inch petroleum products pipeline ruptured along a seam, spilling diesel fuel into Willard Bay State Park near Ogden, Utah. Wildlife was coated with diesel, but the fuel was prevented from entering into water supply intakes. About 25,000 gallons of diesel were spilled.
- March 22 – A Williams Companies 24-inch gas gathering pipeline failed in Marshall County, West Virginia. There were no injuries.
- March 29 – The 2013 Mayflower oil spill occurred when ExxonMobil's 20-inch Pegasus crude oil pipeline spilled near Mayflower, Arkansas, causing crude to flow through yards and gutters, and towards Lake Conway. Wildlife was coated in some places. Twenty-two houses were evacuated, due to the fumes and fire hazard. Estimates say the total amount of 190,000 gallons of diluted bitumen were spilled. Hook cracks and extremely low impact toughness in the LF-ERW seam of the pipe were identified as causes of the failure.

==== April ====
- April 4 – An explosion and fire occurred at a gas compressor station near Guthrie, Oklahoma. Nearby houses were evacuated. There were no injuries reported.
- April 11 – A flash fire at a pipeline gas compressor station broke out when natural gas liquids ignited in Tyler County, West Virginia, seriously burning three workers, two of whom later died. The workers were performing pipeline pigging operations.
- April 30 – The Pegasus oil pipeline spilled a small amount of crude into a residential yard in Ripley County, Missouri, a month after the same pipe spewed thousands of barrels of crude in Arkansas. The Pegasus pipeline was out of service from the Mayflower, Arkansas spill, accounting for the minimal amount of oil spilled in Missouri.

==== May ====
- May 8 – The Kinder Morgan Tejas pipeline compressor station near Crockett, Texas, required an emergency shutdown and subsequently had a fire that caused $7,502,188 in property damage.
- May 9 – Diesel fuel was detected to be leaking from a Marathon pipeline in Indianapolis, Indiana. Over 20,000 gallons of diesel leaked, at a slow rate that was not detected by SCADA systems. Cleanup caused a nearby major road to be shut down for five days. There were no injuries reported.
- May 14 – Late into the night, an explosion and fire hit a Williams Companies gas compressor station near Brooklyn Township, Pennsylvania. There were no reported injuries.
- May 18 – A 24-inch fill line failed, on an Enbridge tank, in Cushing, Oklahoma, spilling about 105,000 gallons of crude oil. The cause was internal corrosion of the line.
- May 30 – Two construction workers were injured, when a fire erupted during welding at a Williams Companies natural gas facility in Hunterdon County, New Jersey.

==== June ====
- June 13 – A 12-inch gas transmission pipeline failed near Torrington, Wyoming. LF-ERW seam failure was suspected as cause. There was no fire or injuries.
- June 18 – In Washington Parish, Louisiana, a Kinder Morgan Florida Gas Transmission Company 30" diameter pipeline ruptured and exploded before dawn, jolting residents out of their beds. No one was seriously hurt but 55 homes were evacuated. The blast knocked down trees in an area about 200 yards across and the fire burned those within another 300 yards. "The ground around the crater is completely bare. The dirt around it is just like it had been cooked in a kiln," and an 80-foot section of pipe was destroyed.

==== July ====
- July 4 – A fire involved a gas compressor and a nearby ruptured 2-inch gas pipeline in Gilmore Township, Pennsylvania. There were no injuries.
- July 22 – An 8-inch natural gas pipeline released gas from a rupture at 1,400 psi, for 90 minutes in New Franklin, Ohio, forcing 75 people to evacuate the area. Afterward, the local Fire Chief said that pipeline owners refused to give information to first responders in previous requests.
- July 23 – Early on that day, a downed 13,000 volt power line sparked a massive gas fire in Mamaroneck, New York when a gas main was damaged by the electricity. Three automobiles were destroyed, and houses were threatened for a time.
- July 26 – A leaking BP 20-inch crude oil pipeline spilled 50 to 100 barrels of crude oil in Washington County, Oklahoma. Some of the crude spilled into a drainage ditch leading to a water reservoir.

==== August ====
- August 12 – In the evening, a 10-inch NGL pipeline exploded and caused a massive propane-ethane mix fire in Erie, Illinois. A number of nearby residents were evacuated for a while, but there were no injuries. About 772,000 gallons of mix were burned or lost. The cause was from a manufacturing defect.
- August 14 – A leak developed on a valve on Longhorn Pipeline in Austin, Texas during maintenance, spilling about 300 gallons of crude oil. There were no evacuations.

==== September ====
- September 2 – Atmos Energy crews dug into a 4-inch gas pipeline in Overland Park, Kansas, causing an explosion and fire. There was no major damage or injuries.
- September 21 – A 10-inch gas gathering pipeline ruptured and burned in Newton County, Texas. About a dozen people from nearby houses were evacuated for a time. There were no injuries.
- September 24 – A Denton TX city water utility worker ruptured a 1/2-inch gas pipeline in Denton, Texas, which immediately caused a fire that gave the worker minor burns. There was no other significant damage.
- September 29 – A farmer near Tioga, North Dakota smelled oil for several days, before discovering a leaking 6-inch 20-year-old Tesoro pipeline under his wheat field. Crews tried to burn off the oil at first. The spill size was estimated at 865,000 gallons, and covered over seven acres. There were no injuries. Corrosion was suspected as being the cause. Governor Jack Dalrymple said he wasn't told of the spill until October 9. In May 2014, it was announced that it would 2 1/2 more years before the spilled crude would be cleaned up.

==== October ====
- October 7
  - A gas pipeline burst in Howard County, Texas. There was no fire, but dangerous hydrogen sulfide in the gas forced evacuations of nearby residents. There were no injuries.
  - Authorities were notified of a Lion Oil Trading and Transportation crude oil pipeline leak in Columbia County, Arkansas. It was estimated that the leak started on September 21. Oil spread into a Horsehead Creek tributary. The Environmental Protection Agency said that approximately 1,500 barrels of oil were lost, but one lawsuit against the oil company claimed the full amount was as much as 5,000 barrels.
- October 8 – A 30-inch Northern Natural Gas pipeline exploded and burned in Harper County, Oklahoma. 220 feet of the pipe was ejected from the ground. Flames were seen for a number of miles, and four houses nearby were evacuated. Oklahoma Highway 283 was closed for several hours until the fire was determined to be under control and safe. There were no injuries.
- October 29 – A Koch Industries 8-inch pipeline spilled about 400 barrels of crude oil near Smithville, Texas. The oil polluted a private stock pond and two overflow reservoirs.

==== November ====
- November 14 – A Chevron operated 10-inch LPG pipeline was ruptured by contractors for the company installing a Cathodic protection system, near Milford, Texas, causing a large fire, and forcing the evacuation of Milford and 200 students of a nearby school. A nearby 14-inch pipeline was threatened by the failure, but did not fail. There were no injuries reported. About 183,000 gallons of propane burned.
- November 17 – An ExxonMobil gas plant exploded and burned near Kingsville, Texas. The plant burned for over a day, but there were no reported injuries.
- November 18 – A gas pipeline burst near Ranger, Texas, causing a fire in a field, with flames reaching 100 feet high. Some houses nearby were evacuated for a time. The owner of the pipeline, Hanlon Gas, had been installing a new compressor station, and they believe a malfunction led to the rupture and fire. There were no injuries reported.
- November 28 – A 30-inch Panhandle Eastern natural gas pipeline exploded in Hughesville, Missouri causing several nearby buildings to catch fire. There was a local evacuation but no injuries. Metallurgical examination determined the root cause of the failure to be corrosion.

==== December ====
- December 9 – A 2-inch pipe on a propane dehydrator failed at the Dixie Pipeline Terminal in Apex, North Carolina, forcing evacuations and sheltering in place at nearby businesses. There was no fire or explosion.
- December 20 – A Sunoco pipeline was found leaking gasoline near Coal Township, Pennsylvania, from external corrosion. About 266 to 471 gallons of product were spilled, and, 1,421 tons of soil were removed, as part of the remediation of that leak.
- December 27 – Two natural gas company workers had minor burns when the pipeline they were working leaked, and the escaping gas exploded and ignited in Shrewsbury, Massachusetts. Flames 30 feet high knocked out phone service in the area.
- December 31 – A contractor accidentally cut a live LPG pipeline during demolition work at a pipeline facility, in LaPorte, Texas. 2 workers received minor burns, and, 30,000 gallons of LPG were burned.

=== 2014 ===
- A 12-inch Williams Companies gas pipeline failed at a weld in Moundsville, West Virginia. The following explosion and fire explosion scorched trees over a 2-acre area near Moundsville. Several houses were evacuated as a precaution. There were no injuries reported.

==== January ====
- January 7 – A Colonial Pipeline line leak resulted from equipment failure in Fountain Inn, South Carolina, spilling about 52,000 gallons of petroleum product, of which around 8,000 gallons was not recovered.
- January 10 – A 12-inch PSNC gas transmission pipeline exploded and burned in Asheville, North Carolina. The cause was damage to the pipeline during installation in 2003. There were no injuries, but the costs of property damage was around $825,000.
- January 29 – About 600 people were evacuated from their homes & businesses, after the gas distribution system was over pressurized, in Lansing, Michigan.

==== February ====
- February 10 – A gas pipeline exploded and burned near Tioga, North Dakota. There were no injuries.
- February 13 – A 30-inch diameter Columbia Gulf Transmission gas pipeline carrying natural gas exploded near Knifley, Kentucky, sending two people to the hospital with injuries, destroying two houses, and alarming residents, who saw flames from miles away. Later, it was determined that Hydrogen embrittlement had caused the pipe failure from when the pipeline was installed in 1965.
- February 19 – A leaking gas main caused a gas build up in a nearby rowhouse, that exploded in Baltimore, Maryland, killing one youth, and seriously injuring another walking by the area. 3 other people had minor injuries. The area on the gas main near the leak had been patched twice in previous months.

==== March ====
- March 6 – Contractors working for Shell Oil Company hit Shell's Houston-to-Houma (Ho-Ho) crude oil pipeline near Port Neches, Texas, spilling 364 barrels of crude oil.
- March 12 – 2014 East Harlem gas explosion: There was a gas explosion in New York City, New York. NTSB investigators found natural gas in the soil nearby, indicating that the gas leak had existed for a while before the explosion.
- March 17 – A 20-inch Mid-Valley Pipeline Company pipeline failed in Hamilton County, Ohio, spilling about 18,900 gallons of crude oil into an adjacent wildlife preserve. Animals in the area were affected. The cause was environmental cracking.
- March 18 – A 3-inch, half-mile flare waste gas pipeline in a neighborhood in Arvin, California, was discovered leaking a few blocks from Arvin High School, in a residential area. It had been leaking for as long as two years.
- March 31 – A pipeline running to a Williams Companies LNG storage facility in Plymouth, Washington exploded and sent shrapnel flying that ruptured an LNG storage tank. Nearly 1,000 residents were evacuated and at least five employees at the facility were injured.

==== April ====
- April 17 – A private excavator accidentally cut a gas line while doing some work in Union Township, Licking County, Ohio. The man suffered second degree burns to the upper portion of his body. There was no damage to any buildings.
- April 23 – An explosion and fire hit a Williams Companies gas processing plant in Opal, Wyoming. All 95 residents of the town were evacuated, and part of US Highway 30 was closed for a time.

==== May ====
- May 6 – Sinclair Oil Corporation pipeline operators detected a pressure drop on a pipeline, with the problem being traced two days later to a leak in Knox County, Missouri. A mixture of gasoline and diesel fuel contaminated soil on a farm.
- May 12 – Three workers from Plantation Pipeline inadvertently ruptured their pipeline at a pump station in Anderson County, South Carolina, causing a geyser of gasoline, and spraying the workers with it. There was no fire, but the workers had to be decontaminated at a hospital.
- May 17 – At Port St. John, Florida, Kinder Morgan's 36" Florida Gas Transmission pipeline ruptured, forcing evacuation of seven homes and halting train traffic through Brevard Co. for three hours near the Florida Power & Light plant. Florida Gas Transmission workers searched for a leak when pressure dropped in the line. Homes, vehicle and train traffic were reopened after the remaining gas escaped from the pipe. This pipeline failure caused $177,321 in property damage.

==== June ====
- June 26 – Near East Bernard, Texas, a gas pipeline adjacent to a Kinder Morgan gas compressor plant blew out, destroying the roadway and setting a nearby truck on fire just south of Highway 59. Flames as high as 150 feet were shooting out of the pipeline. The focus was on a 27-inch pipeline that sends gasoline to different tank farms along the line.

==== July ====
- July 10 – A vent stack at a Williams Field Services gas pipeline compressor station in Susquehanna County, Pennsylvania caught fire. Only minor damage was reported at other parts of the station.
- July 23 – In Milledgeville, Georgia, Midway Elementary School faculty and staff were evacuated due to a fire, caused by a gas leak at nearby Southern Natural Gas Co. tap station. Fire rescue personnel closed down Highway 441 South for an hour. Due to the amount of pressure, precautionary measures were taken so pipe wouldn't rupture under the road while Southern Natural Gas tried to determine the cause of the leak. "It could be some type of failure in a valve or regulator. Right now we don't know but Southern Natural Gas is looking into it." No injuries were reported.

==== August ====
- August 4 – A Greka 6-inch underground oil pipeline spilled over 1,200 gallons of crude oil south of Orcutt, California. The oil spread out over less than a mile from the leak and did not contaminate the nearby creek.
- August 12 – A mulching machine hit a 12-inch natural gas pipeline in Rusk County, Texas. The operator of the machine was killed in the following explosion.
- August 20 – A Buckeye Partners pipeline leaked, inside their terminal, in Linden, New Jersey. About 5900 gallons of jet fuel were spilled, of which most was recovered. The cause of the leak was from internal corrosion of the line.
- August 21 – Four workers were injured in a fire while a crew was performing maintenance on a natural gas pipeline in Garvin County, Oklahoma. The injured workers were treated and released from a hospital, and there was no explosion.

==== September ====
- September 14 – A contract worker performing routine maintenance on a Chevron offshore gas pipeline was killed, and two other workers were injured. The accident occurred 6 miles south of Timbalier Bay off the southeast coast of Louisiana.
- September 16 – More than 500 residents of Benton Township, Michigan, were forced to leave their houses for 10 to 12 hours, after authorities discovered a leak on TransCanada Corporation's 22-inch ANR gas transmission pipeline.
- September 17 – 3 LG&E subcontractors were injured, when a gas main exploded after being hit by equipment during maintenance of the gas main, along a stretch of U.S. 42 in Oldham County, Kentucky. There was no fire.

==== October ====
- October 13 – A gas transmission pipeline failed near Centerview, Missouri, causing an explosion and massive fire for several hours. There were no injuries.
- October 14 – A Sunoco/Mid-Valley crude oil pipeline ruptured, and spilled about 189,000 gallons of crude oil, in Caddo Parish, Louisiana. Wildlife was killed. The cause of the failure was environmental cracking.
- October 23 – A 24-inch gas transmission pipeline was hit by excavators near Newport, Arkansas. Five nearby houses were evacuated, and two highways and a railroad were closed for a time. There was no fire or injuries.
- October 28 – An 8-inch natural gas condensate pipeline exploded in Monroe County, Ohio. A large fire followed. There were no injuries.

==== December ====
- December 8 – Gasoline was discovered leaking from Kinder Morgan Plantation Pipeline in Belton, South Carolina. It was found that the 26-inch pipeline had leaked into a nearby creek. The cause was a failure at a sleeve that was part of an earlier repair. As of April 2015, it was estimated that 369,600 gallons of gasoline had leaked. About 160,500 gallons of gasoline had been recovered and removed.

=== 2015 ===
==== January ====
- January 14
  - A fire broke out at an oil pipeline pump station, in Texas City, Texas. Texas City fire officials said that company officials reported that there had been issues with the pump station over the weekend. There were no injuries.
  - During work to free a trapped inline inspection unit, a leak was discovered on the Evangeline Pipeline, near Cameron Parish, Louisiana. This pipeline had been given a Corrective Action Order in October 2014, due to a number of leaks.
  - A gas pipeline exploded near the Ross Barnett Reservoir in Brandon, Mississippi, creating a sizable crater in the ground and burning 6 acres of vegetation before the fire was extinguished. No injuries were reported. The failure was due to a "hard spot" from manufacturing, that already had a repair sleeve on it. There are 788 sleeves on the Index 129 pipeline from Edna, Texas, to Sterlington, Louisiana; and, 726 sleeves on the Index 130 pipeline from Marchand Junction, Louisiana to Kosciusko, Mississippi. Both were built from pipe made in 1952.
- January 16 – A transmission pipeline operated by Kinder Morgan subsidiary Southern Natural Gas had an equipment malfunction in Walthall County, Mississippi. The cause was cold weather; ice build-up caused a regulator to malfunction.
- January 17 – Oil from a broken pipeline seeped into the Yellowstone River, and contaminated the water supply 10 miles south of Glendive, Montana. The release was from Bridger Pipeline LLC's 12-inch Poplar line, which can carry 42,000 barrels a day of crude from the Bakken Formation and runs from Canada south to Baker, Montana. Bridger Pipeline is a subsidiary of True Cos., a privately held Wyoming-based company. The company said in a statement that the pipeline was shut down within an hour of the leak. About 30,000 gallons of crude were spilled, with about 28,000 gallons of crude being lost.
- January 21
  - A petroleum products pipeline in Honolulu, Hawaii ruptured, due to external corrosion, spilling about 42,000 gallons of petroleum product, of which about 22,000 gallons was lost.
  - A crude oil pipeline pump station caught fire northwest of Texas City, Texas. Texas City fire officials said that company officials reported that there had been issues with the pump station over the weekend.
- January 26 – A 20-inch Enterprise Products ATEX pipeline carrying ethane exploded and burned, in Brooke County, West Virginia. Despite snow in the area, five acres of woodlands burned, and 1,283,000 gallons of ethane were consumed, or lost. The fireball melted siding on nearby homes and damaged power lines; it is believed that day’s snowy weather lessened the damage. Reports suspect a girth weld failure from ductile tensile overload, with the pipeline being less than two years old. Survey showed that the pipeline had slumped three feet since being built. A geotechnical survey conducted by Pennsylvania Soil and Rock determined that the failed pipe was installed across a transition area or "head wall" of an old underground mine and surface strip mine. There were no injuries.
- January 29 – Near Bowling Green, Missouri, a rupture in a Rockies Express 42-inch-diameter natural gas pipeline blew a 20 by 20-foot crater and forced a six-hour evacuation of 50 families. The rupture occurred in a vacant field a few yards east of Pike County Road 43. Strong winds dissipated gas until a temporary cap was put in place. This explosion did $2,672,345 in property damage and was caused by a faulty weld; the pipe was manufactured in 2008.

==== February ====
- February 10 – In Hopkinton, Massachusetts, low temperatures caused freezing rain to do "natural force damage" to a Kinder Morgan Tennessee Gas Pipeline, causing $55,150 worth of property damage.
- February 17 – A suspected electrical arc made a hole in a Marathon Petroleum pipeline in Shively, Kentucky, spilling about 6,700 gallons of jet fuel. More than 2,500 tons of soil were removed to clean up the area.
- February 25 – A 26-inch crude oil pipeline in Navarro County near the Town of Dawson, Texas, failed, spilling about 50 barrels of crude oil. Near the failure, investigation showed that the pipe had lost about 80% of its thickness due to external corrosion. This anomaly was not seen in a 2011 test of this pipeline.

==== March ====
- March 2 – A Kinder Morgan Tennessee Gas Pipeline leaked due to equipment failure, causing $281,890 of property damage in Marshall, Mississippi. The pipe was manufactured in 1944.
- March 13 – A pipeline Patrol pilot identified an oil sheen on a pond near Tehuacana Creek, Texas which was then linked to a leaking 10-inch petroleum products pipeline. About 50 barrels of diesel fuel were spilled.
- March 20 – A pipe owned by Kinder Morgan subsidiary Southern Natural Gas failed in Rolling Fork, Mississippi; the pipe was manufactured in 1930.
- March 23 – Another Southern Natural Gas pipeline failed due to a cracked weld at Augusta, Georgia, causing $311,785 in property damage.

==== April ====
- April 9 – 2 Williams Companies pipelines broke within hours of each other in Marshall County, West Virginia. A 4-inch condensate pipeline broke at 8 pm local time, spilling about 132 barrels of condensate into a creek. Around 10:50 pm local time, a 12-inch gas pipeline ruptured. There was no fire or injuries. Heavy rains were said to be the cause of the failures.
- April 10 – A landowner, in Glen Mills, Pennsylvania, reported a petroleum odor to the Sunoco Control Center. The source of the odor was traced to the Point Breeze to Montello 12" refined products pipeline system. About 1,600 gallons of mixed refined products was leaked. The cause was external corrosion.
- April 13 – A Kinder Morgan / Natural Gas Pipeline Company of America pipeline exploded and burned near Borger, Texas. One home was evacuated, but there were no injuries. The explosion, caused by equipment failure due to environmental cracking, caused $455,000 in property damage. A 60-foot section and a 30-foot section of pipe were ejected and landed about 60 feet and 100 feet away from the failure site, respectively. Metallurgical analysis revealed the cause of the leak was stress corrosion cracking. The pipe was manufactured in 1967.
- April 17 – A 12-inch natural gas pipeline near Fresno, California operated by Pacific Gas and Electric Company was ruptured by a backhoe. The resulting explosion killed 1 person and injured 12 others.

==== May ====
- May 15 – Kinder Morgan's Tennessee Gas Pipeline leaked in Powell County, Kentucky causing $23,400 in property damage.
- May 19 – A Plains All American Pipeline oil pipeline ruptured near Refugio State Beach, also near Goleta, California, spilling about 124,000 gallons of crude oil. It is referred to as the Refugio Oil Spill. Earlier, the pipeline company had assured the government that a break in the line while possible was “extremely unlikely”.
- May 31 – A 24-inch diameter Texas Eastern natural gas pipeline under the flooding Arkansas River ruptured in Little Rock, Arkansas, damaging a tugboat which "sustained damage on the port side, the smokestack and main deck." The pipeline exploded with enough force to raise geysers of water in the river and also threw cement chunks onto the tugboat‘s deck. The pipeline is owned by Houston-based Spectra Energy. Analysis concluded that high water flow in the river eroded the cover over the pipeline and scoured away the soil support under the pipeline. Once the pipeline was exposed as a free span, rushing water caused vertical oscillation of the pipe, resulting in metal fatigue, cracking the pipe adjacent to a girth weld. The pipe was manufactured in 1952.

==== June ====
- June 9
  - In Moorehouse Parish, Louisiana, Kinder Morgan's Tennessee Gas Pipeline equipment failed due to environmental cracking, and leaked, causing $73,395 in property damage. The pipe was manufactured in 1948.
  - A 24-inch natural gas pipeline ruptured in Lycoming County, Pennsylvania. About 130 individuals were evacuated from their homes. No injuries or damage reported. There was no fire. The cause was stress corrosion cracking. The pipe was installed in 1963. When it failed, it was owned by Transcontinental Gas Pipe Line Company.
- June 10 – Kinder Morgan's El Paso Natural Gas control/relief equipment failed and leaked in Gray County, Texas. Technicians believed debris or trash may have caused the valve to malfunction.
- June 13 – An Energy Transfer Partners 42-inch gas gathering pipeline exploded and burned near Cuero, Texas. Seven homes were evacuated, but there were no injuries. The heat from the flames melted electric lines, cutting off power to 130 homes. Sixteen people were evacuated from homes near the explosion, which caused $500,000 in damage. Energy Transfer Company reported to the Texas Commission on Environmental Quality that as much as 165,732 pounds of volatile organic compounds burned. The Railroad Commission of Texas, in its Pipeline Safety Evaluation, and Inspection Package number 111385, published November 2, 2015, concluded that material failure, as a result of bending stress overload that caused a weld to fail, led to the rupture, explosion, and fire. The pipeline was constructed and installed in 2012.
- June 15 – Kinder Morgan's Natural Gas Pipeline Co. of America equipment failed adjacent to a weld seam for unknown causes, with $260,555 of property damage in Marshall, Texas (that area's third documented Kinder Morgan leak). The pipe was manufactured in 1967.
- June 18 – In Victoria Texas, Kinder Morgan's Tennessee Gas Pipeline pipe failed due to external corrosion and caused $159,346 in property damage. The pipe was manufactured in 1944.
- June 22 – A truck driver was killed when his rig veered off a highway and broke above ground facilities for a propylene pipeline in Houston, Texas. The highway was closed for several hours while the gas dissipated.
- June 25 – Four workers were hurt when a 4-inch gas pipeline exploded at a gas pipeline facility, near White Deer, Texas. 2 of the workers were critically injured. The cause of the explosion was not immediately known.

==== July ====
- July 10 – A fitting on a 20-inch Plains All American Pipeline crude oil pipeline broke, spilling 4200 gallons of crude oil near Grantfork, Illinois. Much of the crude reached a nearby creek. There were no injuries.
- July 15 – Two workers were hurt by an explosion, when a bulldozer hit a 4-inch gas pipeline, at an EQT Corporation gas compressor station in Worthington, Pennsylvania. One of the workers later on died from the injuries. While the contractor did use the 811 One call system, the pipeline hit was not a participant of 811. Later this incident was a factor in restricting 811 exemptions.

==== August ====
- August 3 – A Kinder Morgan Tennessee Gas Pipeline 16-inch diameter pipe exploded; the blowout created a 70-foot by 30-ft crater 350 feet from a house and did $191,498 in property damage. Investigation found a longitudinal split in the pipe about 55 feet long along an ERW seam, but the failure was from stress corrosion cracking. The pipe was manufactured in 1947.
- August 7 – A natural gas liquids pipeline in Weld County, Colorado burned after being struck by a third party.
- August 13
  - Crew working for Colonial Pipeline damaged one of Colonial's lines in Kannapolis, North Carolina, spilling about 6,000 gallons of petroleum product. About 1,000 gallons of product was lost.
  - A natural gas pipeline in Cypress, Texas, ruptured and leaked while a contract crew worked in the area. The pipeline was owned by Gulfsouth Pipeline. There were no injuries or immediate damage; residents were evacuated.
- August 17 – A 4-inch gas pipeline was hit and ruptured by an excavator, in Winfield, West Virginia. During the shut down of the pipeline, the gas ignited, burning a repair crew worker.
- August 26 – Two maintenance divers were injured while working on a pipeline owned by Boardwalk/Gulf South Pipeline Co. 25 miles offshore of Louisiana when the pipeline ruptured and the gas ignited.

==== September ====
- September 5 – Great Lakes Gas Transmission Company had an explosion at a compressor station in Kittson County, Minnesota, about a mile south of the Canadian border. The cause was mechanical failure caused by stress corrosion cracking. The pipe was installed in 1972.
- September 16 – A Shell Oil Company crude oil pipeline leaked near Tracy, California, spilling about 37,800 gallons of crude. An in line inspection report of that pipeline two weeks before had detected no anomalies.
- September 21 – A Colonial Pipeline 32-inch main line leaked in Centreville, Virginia, spilling about 4,000 gallons of gasoline and forcing several nearby businesses to close.

==== October ====
- October 8 – Natural gas ignited and exploded at a Williams Companies pipeline facility in Gibson, Louisiana. Four employees were killed and one injured. Cost of the accident was $7,545,044. The cause of the explosion was from procedure not being followed during welding work.

==== November ====
- November 3 – A leak occurred due to a crack in a girth weld on a Texas Eastern Transmission 24-inch diameter pipeline near Onalaska, Texas. The pipe was manufactured in 1954.
- November 13 – In Bakersfield, California, a heavy equipment operator doing agricultural work struck a 30-inch-diameter PG&E natural gas transmission line, causing a release of gas. The gas ignited and in the resulting explosion one person died and three others were sent to the hospital with second- and third-degree burns. A nearby home and barn were damaged by the fire.
- November 15 – Work was being performed on a flow control valve, on a Sunoco 10-inch crude oil pipeline, in Wortham, Texas, when the valve failed, injuring five workers, and spilling some crude oil. It was later determined that the valve was under 400 psi of nitrogen pressure when it was being worked on.
- November 21 – Paiute Pipeline personnel were running an inline inspection tool through the 8-inch-diameter Carson lateral pipeline. The leading eye of the tool struck the inside of a long radius 45-degree elbow, puncturing the pipe and resulting in a rupture. Public and private property damage included six vehicles and a landscape retaining wall as a result of the blowing dirt and rocks.
- November 24 – Transco reported a leak on a "dead-leg" section of piping, located on a 20-inch header/regen pipe, within a station in Austin, Pennsylvania. There was no fire or injuries. The facility was shut down for 14 days for repairs and the cost of the damage was approximately $224,528. The cause was internal microbial corrosion.
- November 30 – About 11,000 gallons of gasoline, butane and propane leaked from a pipeline, in eastern Summit County, Utah.

==== December ====
- December 1 – Personnel from Enterprise Crude Pipeline, LLC (Enterprise Products), discovered a spill at their West Cushing Tank Farm in Cushing, Oklahoma. Approximately 42,000 gallons of crude oil were released within the terminal. A tank line had failed from internal corrosion.
- December 8 – A contractor drilled into an 8-inch buried oil line (200 mm), that transports oil from a holding station in Ventura, to a Wilmington refinery, near Long Beach, while setting new poles for Southern California Edison along State Route 118 near Somis that spilled about 7,980 U.S. gallons (190 barrels).

=== 2016 ===
==== January ====
- January 2 – Three people were injured (one seriously), one home was destroyed, and 50 homes were damaged in Oklahoma City, Oklahoma when a gas leak from a gas main entered a home. Preliminary results indicate that a leak occurred at a weld seam on the gas main. Later, Oklahoma regulators filed a complaint over the failure with Oklahoma Natural Gas. The complaint alleged the utility failed to properly inspect its system following eight previous leak failures in the neighborhood going back to 1983.
- January 9 – A 30-inch Atmos Energy gas transmission pipeline exploded and burned in Robertson County, Texas. Four families nearby were evacuated.
- January 11 – Butane leaking from a pipeline storage facility in Conway, Kansas forced a closure of a nearby highway for a time.

==== February ====
- February 14 – A 6-inch crude oil pipeline broke near Rozet, Wyoming, spilling about 1,500 gallons of crude oil into a creek bed.
- February 16 – An explosion and fire occurred at a gas plant in Frio County, Texas. Two employees at the plant were injured.
- February 24 – A 10-inch propane pipeline exploded and burned near Sulphur, Louisiana. There were no injuries. About 208,000 gallons of propane were burned. The cause was from manufacturing defects.

==== March ====
- March 11 – About 30,000 gallons of gasoline spilled from a leaking plug on a pipeline at a tank farm in Sioux City, Iowa.
- March 22 – About 4,000 gallons of gasoline spilled from a 6-inch petroleum products pipeline in Harwood, North Dakota.

==== April ====
- April 2 – The TransCanada Corporation Keystone Pipeline was observed by a local resident to be leaking near Freeman, South Dakota. The cause was a crack in a girth weld, and the amount of tar sands dilbit spilled was about 16,800 gallons.
- April 12 – A pipeline at a gas plant in Woodsboro, Texas exploded, killing two men and injuring another worker.
- April 17 – A 10-inch petroleum products pipeline failed in Wabash County, Illinois, resulting in a sheen on the Wabash River. About 48,000 gallons of diesel fuel were spilled.
- April 29 – A 30-inch Texas Eastern/Spectra Energy pipeline exploded, injuring one man, destroying his home and damaging several others. The incident was reported at 8:17 a.m. near the intersection of Routes 819 and 22 in Salem Township, Westmoreland County, Pennsylvania. Later, Spectra Energy Corp. announced plans to dig up and assess 263 miles of that pipeline from Pennsylvania to New Jersey. Corrosion had been detected at the failed seam four years before the rupture.

==== May ====
- May 20 – A Shell Oil Company pipeline leaked near Tracy, California, spilling about 21,000 gallons of crude oil. The pressure on that pipeline had been increased three days before after a series of repairs.

==== June ====
- June 23 – A Crimson Pipeline crude oil line leaked in Ventura County, California. Initial reports said the spill size was from 25,200 gallons to 29,000 gallons, but later reports estimate 45,000 gallons of crude were spilled.

==== July ====
- July 6 – A Plantation Pipeline line was noticed to be leaking in Goochland County, Virginia. The spill did not reach nearby waterways.
- July 18 – A Kinder Morgan Tejas gas pipeline operated by Energy Transfer Partners exploded at the gas plant on the Santa Gertrudis Division of the King Ranch, about six miles south of Texas State Highway 141. According to the PHMSA incident listing, the cause was “other outside force damage.” The company lost only $380,000 in product, but the total loss in property damage was $13,842,000.

==== August ====
- August 1 – A lightning strike in rural Powell County, Kentucky impacted Kinder Morgan’s compressor station on its Tennessee Gas Pipeline system in Clay City. The company's emergency shutdown system was activated, safely venting natural gas into the air, but a fine mist of oil was spewed onto the nearby highway and land. As a precaution, the road was closed to lay down sand to absorb the lubricant. A nearby homeowner's yard, vehicles and pool were covered in the substance. The PHMSA incident listing shows property damage was $138,750.
- August 10 – Seven people died after a gas explosion at a Silver Springs, Maryland apartment complex. Warning signs were claimed, including a smell of gas reported by residents before the explosion, but nothing was done to fix the issue.
- August 12 – Contractors were working on one of the main lines in Sunoco Pipeline LP's Nederland, Texas terminal when crude oil burst through a plug that was supposed to hold the oil back in the pipeline and ignited. The contractors were knocked off the platform to the ground, suffering injuries from the fall and severe burns. Seven contractors were injured.
- August 29 – A Sunoco pipeline ruptured near Sweetwater, Texas. The leak was not found until September 10. About 361,000 gallons of crude oil were spilled. The pipeline was just over a year old. The cause was from external corrosion of the pipe.

==== September ====
- September 5 – A pipeline in Bay Long, Louisiana was hit by a dredger, resulting in a spill of about 5,300 gallons of crude oil into the water.
- September 9 – A Colonial Pipeline mainline leak was noticed by workers engaged on another project in Shelby County, Alabama. At least 309,000 gallons of gasoline leaked from the line.

==== October ====
- October 8 – In Jenkins County, Georgia a Kinder Morgan Southern Natural Gas pipeline leak, which "sounded like a jet engine times ten," exploded at 2:30 p.m. and was still leaking three hours later. Highway 25 was closed, visitors at Magnolia State Park were evacuated, the nearby airport was notified, and a warning was sent to Norfolk Southern to stop a train. According to PHMSA, the cause was environmental cracking due to a weld or pipe failure.
- October 11 – Two Nicor Gas workers were injured and two townhouse units were destroyed in a massive fire and explosion caused by a gas leak in Romeoville, Illinois.
- October 17 – An 8-inch ammonia pipeline started leaking near Tekamah, Nebraska. A farmer living nearby went to find the source of the ammonia and was killed by entering the vapor cloud. About 50 people were evacuated from their homes. The NTSB determined that the probable cause of the pipeline rupture was corrosion fatigue cracking that grew and coalesced under disbonded polyethylene tape coating. Contributing to the location of the cracking was external loading that caused bending stress in the pipe in addition to the cyclic stresses in the pipe from the internal pressure of the ammonia transported.
- October 19 – A contractor in Portland, Oregon hit a 1-inch gas pipeline during work. Within an hour, there were two explosions, injuring eight people, destroying or damaging several buildings, and starting a fire. Contractors claim a utility locate was done before work began.
- October 21 – An 8-inch Sunoco pipeline ruptured in Lycoming County, Pennsylvania, spilling about 55,000 gallons of gasoline into the Susquehanna River. The river was running high at the time.
- October 23 – A pipeline ruptured on the Seaway Pipeline in Cushing, Oklahoma, spraying the area with crude oil. About 319,000 gallons of crude were spilled. The cause was from prior excavation damage.
- October 31 – A Colonial Pipeline mainline exploded and burned in Shelby County, Alabama after accidentally being hit by a track hoe. One worker died at the scene, and five others were hospitalized, with one of those workers dying a month later. The explosion occurred approximately several miles from the 9 September 2016 breach.

==== November ====
- November 29 – An Enterprise Products pipeline exploded in Platte County, Missouri, burning about 210,000 gallons of an ethane propane mixture. There were no evacuations or injuries. The cause of the failure was stress corrosion cracking.

==== December ====
- December 2 – Equipment failure in a Denbury Resources source water pipeline led to a leak of approximately 84,000 gallons of source water into Skull Creek in Bowman County, North Dakota.
- December 5 – A 6-inch Belle Fourche pipeline spilled 529,800 gallons of crude oil into Ash Coulee Creek in Billings County, North Dakota. The metallurgical and root cause failure analysis indicated the failure was caused by compressive and bending forces due to a landslide impacting the pipeline.
- December 12 – Transco reported an explosion and fire that severely damaged a facility in Austin, Pennsylvania, resulting in an estimated $15,000,000 in damage to the facility. Internal corrosion was determined to be the cause.
- December – A natural gas pipeline running beneath Turnagain Arm in Cook Inlet near Nikiski, Alaska (southwest of Anchorage) ruptured, leaking large quantities of natural gas into the water.

=== 2017 ===
==== January ====
- January 7 – A Colonial Pipeline stubline leaked gasoline into Shoal Creek in Chattanooga, Tennessee.
- January 14 – The Ozark Pipeline, an Enbridge (now Marathon Oil) division, spilled about 18,900 gallons of light oil at the Lawrence Pump Station near Halltown, Missouri.
- January 16 – A gas pipeline exploded and burned near Spearman, Texas. There were no injuries.
- January 19 – A Tallgrass Pony Express Pipeline failed in Logan County, Colorado, spilling about 420,300 gallons of crude oil. The cause of the failure was unknown.
- January 25 – A Magellan pipeline leaked 46,830 gallons (1,115 barrels) of diesel fuel onto private agricultural land in Worth County, Iowa near Hanlontown.
- January 30 – A Texas Department of Transportation crew dug into the 30-inch-diameter Seaway Pipeline near Blue Ridge, Texas, spraying crude oil across a road. About 210,000 gallons of crude were spilled. There were no injuries.
- January 31 – A DCP pipeline exploded under a runway at Panola County Airport-Sharpe Field in Texas. There were no injuries, but the airport shut the runway down for an extended amount of time.

==== February ====
- February 9 – A Phillips 66 natural gas liquids pipeline (TENDS pipeline Sorrento system) near the Williams-Discovery natural gas plant on US Route 90 near Paradis, Louisiana exploded while being cleaned, killing one worker and sending another worker to a burn unit. Traffic on US-90 and LA-631 was shut down, and residents in the area evacuated.
- February 15 – A 36-inch-diameter Kinder Morgan natural gas pipeline exploded and burned in Refugio County, Texas. There were no injuries. The flames were visible 50 miles away. Refugio County Chief Deputy Sheriff Gary Wright said the explosion occurred at an apparent weak point in the pipeline that must have required maintenance, but KM disputed the issue. Residents as far as 60 miles away thought it was an earthquake, while others described it as "a thunder roll that wouldn’t end.” According to the PHMSA incident listing, "the incident was most likely caused by some combination of stress factors on the pipeline." The explosion and resulting fire cost $525,197 in property damage. The pipe was installed in 1964.
- February 27 – A crude oil pipeline ruptured in Falls City, Texas, spilling about 42,630 gallons of crude oil. The cause was from internal corrosion.

==== March ====
- March 3 – A leak on the Dakota Access Pipeline in Watford City, North Dakota spilled approximately 84 gallons of oil, contaminating local snow and soil. The leak was contained before it could reach any waterways.
- March 5 – An oil spill due to an above-ground valve malfunction on the Dakota Access Pipeline occurred in Mercer County, North Dakota. An estimated 20 gallons were spilled.
- March 29 – A natural gas leak of a high-pressure pipeline in Providence, Rhode Island owned by Spectra Energy released about 19 million cubic feet of natural gas, or enough natural gas to heat and keep the lights on for 190,000 homes for a single day. Approximately two gallons of polychlorinated biphenyls (PCBs) were also released in the form of contaminated natural gas condensate.

==== April ====
- April 1 – Energy Transfer Partners's Mariner East pipelines leaked about 840 gallons of an ethane-propane mix in Berks County, Pennsylvania. This, and several other incidents, later led to a $200,000 fine. There were no injuries.
- April 4 – A pump on the Dakota Access Pipeline spilled about 84 gallons of oil at a pump station in Tulare, South Dakota. The leak was not noticed until May 9.
- April 13 and 14 – It was discovered that Energy Transfer Partners spilled drilling fluid into two separate wetlands in rural Ohio while constructing the Rover Pipeline. The spills occurred in wetlands near Richland County, Ohio. The spill on the 13th released 2 million gallons of drilling fluid, and the spill on the 14th released approximately 50,000 gallons of drilling fluid.
- April 21 – A Plains All American Pipeline experienced a crude oil release on the Buffalo Pipeline near Loyal, Oklahoma. About 19,000 gallons of crude oil were spilled.
- April 22 – A 1,050-gallon oil pipeline spill in Bowman County, North Dakota polluted a tributary of the Little Missouri River but was prevented from flowing into the larger waterway.

==== May ====
- May 8 – A Wood River Pipelines (part of Koch Industries) line broke in Warrensburg, Illinois, spilling 250 gallons of crude oil.
- May 25 – Workers were installing a replacement pipeline at a tank battery near Mead, Colorado, when there was an explosion and fire. One worker was killed, and three others were injured.

==== July ====
- July 13 – A contractor doing maintenance on Magellan's Longhorn Pipeline hit that pipeline in Bastrop County, Texas. About 87,000 gallons of crude oil were spilled, resulting in evacuations of nearby residents.
- July 27 – While installing a water pipeline by horizontal drilling, a contractor hit a ONEOK Natural Gas Liquids pipeline, spilling about 126,000 gallons of NGL's near Watford City, North Dakota.

==== August ====
- August 2
  - A pipeline leaked up to 1,000 gallons of oil in Signal Hill, California.
  - A contractor ruptured a jet fuel pipeline in Parkland, Washington.
  - A natural gas explosion and fire struck the Minnehaha Academy in Minneapolis, Minnesota. Workers may have been moving a gas meter when the explosion hit, killing two people and injuring at least nine others, according to investigators.

==== September ====
- September 22
  - A gas pipeline exploded and burned in Welda, Kansas. There were no injuries.
  - Fire broke out at a substation of the Iroquois Pipeline, causing homes to be evacuated and about two miles of Route 37 to be shut down for several hours near Waddington, New York. The cause of the failure was never found.

==== October ====
- October 18 – Louisiana-based oil company LLOG Exploration had a crude oil spill of about 672,000 gallons 40 miles southeast of Venice, Louisiana, citing the cause as a cracked pipeline under the Gulf of Mexico.
- October 23 – At a facility owned by EDC-Timken, operated and maintained by Columbia Gas Transmission in Navarre, Ohio, an unintended natural gas release was noted by the onsite company personnel. While investigating the sound, the single bolt hinged closure that appeared to be the source of the release failed. The closure failure fatally injured one technician. The equipment was installed in 1989. The leak just south of Canton, Ohio, forced authorities to evacuate a neighborhood.

==== November ====
- November 16 – The Keystone Pipeline leaked crude oil near Amherst, South Dakota. The pipeline was shut down within 15 minutes of the leak's discovery. Later, the NTSB found a metal tracked vehicle had run over this section of pipeline, causing the damage. During cleanup activities, state officials say a semi-trailer driver hauling hazardous material to and from the Keystone oil pipeline leak site purposely dumped soil contaminated with crude oil on the side of a northeastern South Dakota road. The original estimate was increased to 6,592 barrels (276,900 US gal) spilled.
- November 16 – Three men were injured in a gas pipeline fire in northeastern Weld County, Colorado. One later died of his injuries.
- November 20
  - Kinder Morgan’s Connecticut Expansion Project's pipeline test at the Agawam, Massachusetts compressor station discharged 16,500 gallons of hazardous wastewater onto the soil of the compressor station yard; the wastewater contained heavy metals, lead, and carcinogens such as tetrachloroethylene and phthalate. Kinder Morgan blamed subcontractor Henkels & McCoy for an operator error.
  - A Consumers Energy 22-inch-diameter gas transmission pipeline carrying gas at 600 psi exploded and burned in Orion Township, Michigan, knocking out the county 911 system and causing some evacuations. There were no injuries.
- November 29 – In Richmond, Massachusetts, a Kinder Morgan pipeline overpressure triggered a relief valve to open, releasing natural gas for a blowdown that lasted 40 minutes and sounded like a jet engine. The gas escaped into a nearby residential neighborhood. Firefighters responded to the leak and closed the road. When contacted, pipeline personnel had no idea that there was a problem and offered no reason for their equipment malfunction.

==== December ====
- December 5 – A father and his adult son were killed when a stuck tractor they were trying to free ruptured and ignited a 20-inch-diameter gas pipeline in Lee County, Illinois. Two others were seriously injured. The explosion was on Kinder Morgan’s Natural Gas Pipeline Company of America, a 9,200-mile long system that transports natural gas from Texas and Louisiana to Chicago; Kinder Morgan issued a force majeure notice on the pipeline indicating a “third-party strike” as the reason for taking part of the Illinois Lateral out of service.
- December 6 – A gas pipeline exploded and burned in Eddy County, New Mexico. Residents within two miles of the site were evacuated, and several roads in the area were closed. There were no injuries.
- December 13 – An Energy Transfer Partners gas pipeline exploded and burned in Burleson County, Texas. There were no injuries reported.
- December 31 – Four workers were injured while working on a 10-inch gas main in Boston, Massachusetts when the gas ignited. Gas had to burn a number of hours due to cold conditions, which prevented the shutting down of gas in the area.

=== 2018 ===
==== January ====
- January 8 – A 12-inch pipeline was damaged and leaked 500 barrels (27,500 gallons) of gasoline in Eagan, MN. No injuries were reported; however, gasoline flowed into the stormwater system. According to Magellan Midstream Partners, the owner of the pipeline, a contractor the company hired accidentally struck and broke open the pipeline that runs from Rosemount to Minneapolis.
- January 10 – A pipeline in Pearl City, Hawaii ruptured and leaked an estimated 500 gallons of fuel oil into two residents' yards. The state Department of Health says a small amount of oil entered the stream.
- January 14 – A natural gas pipeline ruptured, leading to a fire in Geismar, Louisiana. No injuries or fatalities were reported.
- January 30 – A crew using a boring drill hit a natural gas pipe in Arlington, Texas. Escaping gas ignited and burned for over three hours. There were no injuries.
- January 31 – A portion of a pipeline experienced an in-service rupture near the city of Summerfield, Ohio. The rupture of the 24-inch interstate pipeline resulted in the release of approximately 23,500 MCF of natural gas in a rural forested area. A root cause analysis concluded that the girth weld failure was caused by axial stress due to movement of the pipe that exceeded the cross-sectional tensile strength of the net section weld zone surrounding the crack initiation location. There were no injuries.

==== February ====
- February 18 – A 16-inch crude oil pipeline ruptured in Yukon, Oklahoma. Oil accumulated in a 7-acre private pond. About 84,000 gallons of crude were spilled.
- February 23 – A house in a suburb of Dallas, Texas exploded, killing a girl and injuring 4 others in her family. This followed a number of gas distribution line leaks in that area over the previous months. Atmos crew then started large scale replacement of gas lines in that area, resulting in at least 2,800 homes being without gas service for days to weeks. NTSB Investigators were sent to the area.

==== March ====
- March 3 – A fallen electric wire from a utility pole caused a gas line to rupture and burn in Wenham, Massachusetts. There were no injuries reported.
- March 21 – A Marathon Petroleum pipeline spilled about 42,000 gallons of diesel fuel near Solitude, Indiana.

==== April ====
- April 30 – A pipeline failure occurred in a remote mountainous region of Marshall County, West Virginia, resulting in the release of 2,658 barrels of propane. The failure and subsequent release was caused by lateral movement of the 8-inch intrastate pipeline due to earth movement along the right-of-way.

==== May ====
- May 10 – A crude oil pipeline ruptured in Oklahoma City, Oklahoma, leaving a film of crude on a school playground, homes and automobiles. At least 630 gallons of crude were released.
- May 14 – A tractor crashed into a valve on an NGL pipeline in St. Mary Parish, Louisiana, releasing a cloud of a blend of propane, butane, ethane and natural gasoline. Residents and two schools were evacuated for several hours. There was no fire or explosion.
- May 23 – A pipeline rupture and fire in Bienville Parish, Louisiana forced at least 30 nearby residents to evacuate. There were no injuries.

==== June ====
- June 7 – A 36-inch natural gas transmission pipeline exploded and burned near Wheeling, West Virginia. There were no injuries. The pipeline went into service in January 2018. Shifting land was identified as the cause.
- June 14 – A gas pipeline in Tulsa, Oklahoma was ruptured by a tractor. A firefighter and four Oklahoma Natural Gas workers were injured in the explosion and fire that followed the rupture. An initial report said one of the injured was a bystander.
- June 15 – A Southern Star Central Natural Gas pipeline exploded outside Hesston, Kansas, sending flames shooting 75 to 100 feet into the sky.
- June 19 – A Sunoco pipeline leaked more than 33,000 gallons of gasoline into a creek near Philadelphia, Pennsylvania. PHMSA said it first learned of the spill on the evening of June 19 from a “private citizen” who reported a petroleum odor at Darby Creek. About two-thirds of the spill were recovered.

==== July ====
- July 10 – After a gas explosion, later Court documents say a contractor failed to properly mark a natural gas line that was struck, which caused a deadly explosion in downtown Sun Prairie, Wisconsin. A search warrant unsealed in Dane County Circuit Court says a utility marking employee failed to correctly mark the gas line in the street, instead targeting a spot on a sidewalk about 25 feet away. A firefighter was killed when a subcontractor placing fiber communication lines underground ruptured a gas line, which triggered an explosion and fire. Another firefighter was critically injured. The blast destroyed six businesses and one home.

==== August ====
- August 1 – A series of gas pipeline explosions injured seven pipeline workers and firefighters in Midland County, Texas. One injured worker later died. They were responding to a leak report.

==== September ====
- September 6 – A 6-inch Dominion Energy gas gathering pipeline burned near Clarksburg, West Virginia. Lightning was suspected of hitting the pipeline.
- September 7 – A Buckeye Partners pipeline ruptured in Decatur, Indiana, spilling about 8,000 gallons of jet fuel into the St. Marys River (Indiana and Ohio).
- September 10 – The 24-inch Revolution Pipeline of Energy Transfer Partners gas transmission pipeline exploded and burned in Center Township, Beaver County, Pennsylvania. One home, two garages, and six steel high tension power line towers were destroyed, but no injuries were reported. The pipeline had been operating for one week before the failure. Earth movement was suspected as the cause. Later, the Pennsylvania state Department of Environmental Protection (DEP) issued one of its largest-ever civil penalties in the wake of an investigation, which found that Energy Transfer had violated numerous regulations during construction of the Revolution pipeline in western Pennsylvania.
- September 13 – The Massachusetts gas explosions destroyed 40 homes, killed one person, and 21 others were sent to the hospital.

==== October ====
- October 18 – The failure of a natural gas pipeline caused the rupture of a nearby 10 inch crude oil pipeline, in Kleberg County, Texas. About 37,000 gallons of crude burned.

==== November ====
- November 10 – A pipeline ruptured and caught fire in Sutton County, Texas, injuring two people.

==== December ====
- December 13 – A Kinder Morgan pipeline ruptured near Las Cruces, New Mexico. About 462,000 gallons of gasoline were spilled into an irrigation ditch, with some of it suspected of reaching ground water. Later, three nearby properties were bought by Kinder Morgan. The cause appeared to be external corrosion, resulting in a safety order from PHMSA.

=== 2019 ===
==== January ====
- January 17 – A natural gas and oil explosion occurred, resulting in the loss of 1.4 million dollars' worth of natural gas and oil and a fire lasting all day in Watford city, North Dakota. There were no injuries or deaths.
- January 18 – An Enbridge natural gas pipeline exploded in Noble County, Ohio, causing two people to be injured along with damage to two homes.
- January 29 – A pipeline ruptured near the town of Lumberport in Harrison County, West Virginia. The rupture was located at a girth weld of an elbow on the 12-inch interstate pipeline. The root cause investigation concluded that a landslide about 150 yards from the rupture moved the pipeline approximately 10 feet from its original location, causing excessive stress on the pipe that resulted in the rupture.
- January 30 – A crude oil spill caused by an apparent open valve occurred in Enid, Oklahoma. This incident resulted in the release of 750 barrels, or 31,500 gallons, of oil into the environment, which extended five miles down a creek.

==== February ====
- February 2 – A fire was intentionally set in Pittsylvania county, Virginia. This fire caused $500,000 worth of damage to mountain valley pipeline construction. There were no injuries or deaths.
- February 6
  - A natural gas release caused a fire in San Francisco, California. This fire lead to the evacuation of approximately 100 people in the area.
  - An oil spill occurred in St. Charles County, Missouri. This oil spill resulted in the release of 43 barrels, or 1800 gallons.

==== March ====
- March 3 – An Energy Transfer Partners 30-inch natural gas pipeline exploded and burned, destroying a house that was under construction previously in Audrain County, Missouri. There were no deaths, and no one was injured. The cause was Stress Corrosion Cracking. After the failure, during hydrostatic testing of this pipeline, four other sections of pipeline failed. It is estimated that 91,719 cubic feet of natural gas were released during the incident.
- March 4 – An oil and natural gas pipeline explosion due to high pressure happened in Martin County, Texas. This explosion lead to the death of two employees.
- March 18 – An oil spill occurred due to a valve leak in Watford City, North Dakota. This occurrence resulted in 12,600 gallons of oil being released.

==== April ====
- April 4 – A natural gas pipeline explosion occurred, with officials unsure of the cause, in Longstreet, Louisiana. There were no injuries or deaths related to this incident.
- April 24 – A Magellan Midstream Partners pipeline was detected to be losing pressure. Investigation found a leak in the pipeline near Cottonwood, Minnesota. About 8,400 gallons of diesel fuel had leaked from the pipeline.
- April 26 - A Enbridge 20 inch diameter pipeline was found to be leaking at a valve, in Fort Atkinson, Wisconsin. Up to 1,386 gallons of liquids leaked from the valve, causing contamination of groundwater & soil. The Wisconsin Department of Natural Resources was not notified of this leak until July 31, 2020, with Enbridge claiming they thought this was smaller than the reporting size limit.

==== June ====
- June 18 – Pipeline installation workers struck another gas pipeline near Highway 19 at County Road 1420 and County Street 2920 in Grady County, Oklahoma, causing a fire. One worker was injured.

==== July ====
- July 10 – Phillips 66 Pipeline's 12.75-inch crude oil pipeline leaked north of Wichita Falls, Texas. The failure was in a longitudinal seam. An estimated 1,200 barrels (50,400 US gallons) were spilled.

==== August ====
- August 1 – An Enbridge 30-inch gas transmission pipeline exploded and burned in Stanford, Kentucky. One person was killed, and five others were injured. Five homes were destroyed and at least four were damaged in the Indian Camp mobile home park in Stanford, where the explosion occurred. Flames reached more than 300 feet and melted tar on nearby roads, officials said.

==== October ====
- October 3 – A pipeline that had just finished maintenance spilled between 420,000 and 630,000 gallons of diesel fuel into Turkey Creek in Miller Grove, Texas.
- October 29 – Near Edinburg, North Dakota the Keystone Pipeline was shut down after leaking 190,000 gallons of crude oil onto about 4.81 acres of wetlands. The cause was defective pipe.

==== November ====
- November 2 – A scraper passage indicator assembly on a crude oil pipeline was noticed leaking, in Eddy County, New Mexico. During repair work, the pipe completely broke, spilling about 63,000 gallons of crude oil. There were no injuries.
- November 15 – A newly installed gas pipeline exploded and burned in Pepper Pike, Ohio. There were no injuries. The Public Utilities Commission of Ohio said that a preliminary investigation revealed that a welding failure caused the rupture, which caused the explosion and fire.

==== December ====
- December 5 – Three workers suffered severe burns in multiple explosions and a fire at an EOG Resources gas pipeline compressor site near Carpenter, Wyoming.
- December 19
  - A worker was injured in a pipeline incident near Douglas, Wyoming.
  - An explosion in Philadelphia killed two people and destroyed five houses.
  - Three workers were injured during a pipeline explosion in Marshall, Texas.
- December 21 – A Williams Companies gas pipeline compressor plant in Ohio County, West Virginia exploded and burned. There were no injuries reported.
