= Quarterman =

Quarterman is a surname. Notable people with the surname include:

- Charlie Quarterman (born 1998), British cyclist
- Belinda Gail Quarterman Noah, American Lawyer and Producer
- Cynthia L. Quarterman, American lawyer
- Dernard E. Quarterman, American politician
- Elsie Quarterman (1910–2014), American plant ecologist
- Joe Quarterman, American singer
- John Quarterman (born 1954), American writer
- Kurt Quarterman (born 1983), American football guard
- Lloyd Quarterman (1918–1982), American chemist
- Shaquille Quarterman (born 1997), American football linebacker
- Tim Quarterman (born 1994), American basketball player

== See also ==
- Jimenez v. Quarterman, court case decided in 2009 by the Supreme Court of the United States
- Panetti v. Quarterman, court case decided in 2007 by the Supreme Court of the United States
