= Tennessee Gas Pipeline =

Set of natural gas pipelines in the United States

Location
- Country: United States
- Direction: North-east
- Start: Texas–Louisiana Gulf Coast
- To: New England

General information
- Type: Natural gas
- Owner: Kinder Morgan
- Contractors: TGT
- Commissioned: 1943

Technical information
- Length: 11,900 mi (19,200 km)
- Diameter: 32 in (813 mm)

Tennessee Gas Pipeline (TGPL) is a set of natural gas pipelines that run from the Texas and Louisiana coast through Arkansas, Mississippi, Alabama, Tennessee, Kentucky, Ohio, and Pennsylvania to deliver natural gas in West Virginia, New Jersey, New York, and New England. The 11,900-mile (19,200 km) long system is operated by the Tennessee Gas Pipeline Company, a subsidiary of Kinder Morgan. It is one of the largest pipeline systems in the United States. Its FERC code is 9. TGP's PHMSA pipeline operator i.d. is 19160.

== History ==
The first pipeline was constructed by Tennessee Gas Transmission Company (TGT) beginning in 1943. In 1996, TGT-owner Tenneco Energy was acquired by El Paso Corporation, which was in turn acquired by Kinder Morgan in 2012.

== Expansion projects ==
In 2014, KM proposed Northeast Energy Direct Project (NED), a new branch of 117 miles (188 km) of greenfield pipeline to move natural gas from Pennsylvania to Wright, New York, and 129 miles (208 km) of greenfield pipeline to Dracut, Massachusetts.

The Kinder Morgan proposal met with immediate resistance from local and state officials, conservation organizations, and more than 20 Massachusetts towns that the proposed pipeline would cross. Public and environmental safety was the primary concern, due to TGP's history of pipeline accidents. The pipeline route was heavily debated amid complaints about eminent domain and widespread refusal of Kinder Morgan's requests to survey the route. The proposed route would cross land that is heavily wooded with sensitive eco-systems, conservation lands, wildlife reserves, state parks, farmland, towns, and the Connecticut River.

KM proposed that "approximately 91% of the NED Market Path Component would be co-located along existing utility corridors/adjacent to TGP mainline. The total project (both Supply and Market Path Components) would be 82% co-located." An alternative would be to follow the Massachusetts Turnpike highway system from Western Massachusetts into Boston.

Supporters claimed that the pipeline would have positive impacts. "The pipeline is not only a pipeline for natural gas, but it is a pipeline for new construction and jobs." KM claimed, "NED helps sustain electric grids, reduce emissions, lower energy costs and spur economic growth region-wide." The new pipeline would "bring up to 2.2 billion cubic feet per day (62×10^{6} m^{3}/d) of natural gas from the Marcellus shale fields to New England and Canadian markets." The planned pipeline was roughly 350 miles (560 km) long and would be 36 inches (910 mm) in diameter. The design would include "large, powerful compressor stations."

Detractors pointed out the safety issues involved with locating a high-volume, high-pressure gas transmission pipeline through towns and near neighborhoods that would be within the explosion blast zone of a leak. In the Duckworth–Eiber Report, researchers showed that many gas transmission pipelines are dangerously close to homes and schools.

Ultimately, the NED project was shelved due to a shortage of enough customers to justify an increased natural gas supply in New England.

== Significant incidents reported ==
From 2006 to 2017, according to Pipeline and Hazardous Materials Safety Administration (PHMSA) failure reports, TGP had 111 "significant incidents" with their pipelines, resulting in $89,815,380 in property damage and 19 federal enforcement actions.

A "significant incident" results in any of the following consequences:

- fatality or injury requiring in-patient hospitalization
- $50,000 or more in total costs, measured in 1984 dollars
- liquid releases of five or more barrels (55 USgal/barrel)
- releases resulting in an unintentional fire or explosion.

From 2006 to 2017, 27 federal enforcement actions were initiated against TGP, with $422,500 in penalties. Federal inspectors were onsite at TGP locations for 661 days plus 187 days of accident investigations.

From 2006 to 2017, faulty infrastructure caused most of TGP's onshore gas transmission pipeline accidents. Corrosion (internal or external), equipment malfunctions, manufacturing defects, faulty welds, and incorrect installation together accounted for 56% of leaks and more than $90 million in property damage.

Failures may be escalating as pipelines age. In the listings below, note the age of pipes that failed.

== Accidents ==
According to PHMSA, Tennessee Gas Pipeline had at least 257 significant failures (leaks, fires, and explosions) from 1986 to 2017. This number does not include the less notable accidents that did not meet the criteria for reporting. The incidents below are merely a representative sample.

- On March 4, 1965, a 32-inch (810 mm) diameter TGP gas transmission pipeline explosion north of Natchitoches, Louisiana, destroying five homes and killing 17 people including nine children, the deadliest gas transmission pipeline accident in U.S. history. This explosion and others of the era, led to PHMSA's formation in 1967.
- On February 18, 2000, a 24-inch diameter Tennessee Gas Pipeline at Marcellus, New York, leaked natural gas when a pipe cracked. The crack was thought to be caused by a manufacturing defect in the pipe which had been installed in 1951.
- On November 28, 2000, in Portland, Tennessee, a Tennessee Gas Pipeline Company maintenance crew was welding an oil lubrication line at a compressor station when an explosion and flash fire occurred, injuring three workers. Apparently, gas from the compressor migrated into a crankcase and was ignited by a spark. The equipment was installed in 1950.
- On March 6, 2002, at Jeffersonville, Kentucky, a TGP pipe manufactured in 1950 ruptured at a compressor station, causing a fire and explosion. The failure originated at a longitudinal crack in a saddle fillet weld. The explosion caused $2 million in property damage.
- On March 26, 2002, at Clay, Ohio, external corrosion thinned a pipe manufactured in 1966 to a point that it cracked and leaked natural gas.
- On May 21, 2002, at Kensington, Ohio, a landowner discovered dead vegetation in vicinity of a TGP pipeline. Company personnel investigated and found a pinhole leak on the longitudinal seam, a manufacturing defect. The pipe was manufactured in 1956.
- On September 24, 2004, at Hopkinton, Massachusetts, a TGP leak occurred in 24" diameter pipe at a "high consequence area" just upstream of a compressor station, in pipe manufactured in 1977. 28 people were evacuated as a precaution. The leak was apparently due to the pipe resting on a rock ledge which damaged the pipe, causing a pinhole perforation.
- On December 29, 2005, in Allen County, Kentucky, a 30-inch diameter TGP pipe manufactured in 1957 ruptured, leading to evacuation of more than 200 people. "It sounded like a jet plane ... just roaring." What made the situation so critical was the pressure and amount of gas flowing through the pipe. The failure was attributed to combined effects of pre-existing cracking introduced during original construction and longitudinal stresses induced by the terrain. The leak cause property damage of $908,032.
- On July 22, 2006, near Campbellsville, Kentucky, a TGP 24" diameter pipeline exploded, blowing 25-foot chunk of pipe out of the ground; it landed 200 feet away, the pipe twisted and mangled, its external coating burned off. The pipe ruptured due to external corrosion more than two feet long at the bottom of a valley in an area of wet shale, known to cause corrosion on buried pipelines in this part of Kentucky.
- On February 17, 2007, at Cypress, Texas, TGP's 31-inch natural gas pipeline exploded 4 hours after a bulldozer hit it. Residents reported a loud explosion that shook the ground enough to set off car alarms, as well as "a rumbling sound" and a bright orange fireball. Firefighters "backfilled" the break with nitrogen. The pipe was manufactured in 1948.
- On November 30, 2010, a 30" diameter Tennessee Gas Pipeline failed in a semi-rural area between Highway 1 and State Road 3191, two miles northwest of Natchitoches, Louisiana, 1/4 mile northeast of a country club, and 200 feet south of a residential subdivision. Louisiana State Police evacuated 100 homes. Investigation found the pipe had a crack 52 inches long and about half an inch wide. The failure site was near where TGP had a previous failure in 1965 with fatalities. That failure was attributed to stress corrosion cracking.
- On February 10, 2011, at Hanoverton, Ohio, TGP received a report from a local landowner of a fire where a pipeline had ruptured in Columbiana County. There was no formal evacuation of local residents although emergency responders advised some to leave their homes as a precautionary measure. The failure was caused by a crack in a girth weld at the time of construction; the pipe was manufactured in 1963.
- On November 16, 2011, near Glouster, Ohio, a weld failed on a TGP 36" diameter pipe; the leak exploded, leaving a blast crater 30 feet across and 15 feet deep. Three homes were destroyed by the fire. The leak was caused by "displacement produced by a landslide and an inadequate understanding by (TGP) of the influence of the geotechnical threats on the pipeline in this location." A girth weld failed due to earth movement, inadequate design, materials or workmanship, exceeding operational limits & gaps in integrity management.
- On November 21, 2011, near Batesville, Mississippi, a 24" diameter TGP natural gas pipeline ruptured; the resulting leak ignited in a fireball and burned for several hours. Authorities evacuated 20 homes. The cause was a failed repair sleeve installed over a wrinkle bend a 57-inch long fracture in the pipe and a 61-inch long fracture in the repair sleeve. The explosion created a crater 78 feet wide and 15 feet deep. After the gas ignited, 71 people were evacuated. The leak's cause was a sag in the pipeline under an unusually large depth of soil that imposed a high load stress which the pipeline was unable to withstand.
- On February 10, 2015, in Hopkinton, Massachusetts, cold weather caused "natural force damage" to a Tennessee Gas Pipeline when freezing rain or snow entered a vent then froze.
- On March 2, 2015, a Tennessee Gas Pipeline leaked due to equipment failure, causing $281,890 of property damage in Marshall, Mississippi.
- On August 3, 2015, near Falfurrias, Texas, a corroded TGP 16" diameter pipeline exploded, injuring two. The blowout resulted in a 70-foot by 30-foot crater 350 feet from a house. Emergency responders evacuated 100 people and Texas DOT closed Highway 285 for 5 miles east and west until the isolated segment was blown down. Investigation found a longitudinal split about 55 feet long in the pipe. The metallurgical report found that the cause was high ph stress corrosion cracking. The pipe was manufactured in 1947.
- In December 2015, a TGP transmission line leaked when equipment failed, causing $12,482 in property damage, in West Winfield, New York.
- On February 14, 2016, in Charlton, Massachusetts, Kinder Morgan's Tennessee Gas Pipeline transmission line failed due to a malfunction of control or relief equipment, releasing $16,598 worth of gas.
- On August 1, 2016, a lightning strike in rural Powell County, Kentucky, impacted Kinder Morgan's compressor station on its Tennessee Gas Pipeline system in Clay City. The company's emergency shutdown system was activated and natural gas was vented into the air, but a fine mist of oil and other substances were spewed onto the nearby highway and land. As a precaution, the road was closed to lay down sand to absorb the lubricant. Multiple nearby residents had homes and property covered by said "oil" release. According to PHMSA, property damage was $138,750.
- On August 1, 2016, a lightning strike in rural Powell County, Kentucky, impacted a TGP compressor station in Clay City. The company's emergency shutdown system was activated and natural gas was safely vented into the air, but a fine mist of oil was spewed onto Highway 15 and nearby land. A nearby homeowner's yard, vehicles and pool were covered in the substance.
- On November 20, 2017, at Agawam, Massachusetts, an operator error on TGP's Connecticut Expansion Project's pipeline test at the compressor station discharged 16,500 gallons of hazardous wastewater onto the soil of the compressor station yard; the wastewater contained heavy metals, lead, and carcinogens such as tetrachloroethylene and phthalate.
- On November 29, 2017, in Richmond, Massachusetts, over pressure (for unknown cause) triggered a relief valve to open at a TGP pigging station for a 40-minute blowdown, releasing gas into a residential neighborhood. When contacted, TGP personnel had no idea that there was a problem.
- At approximately 7:25 pm EDT on June 26, 2021, TGP’s 24-inch Tennessee Gas Pipeline 2 ruptured and reportedly released approximately 11,000 MCF of natural gas in West Bloomfield, New York. There was no fire or injuries.
