= San Bruno pipeline explosion =

2010 natural gas disaster in California

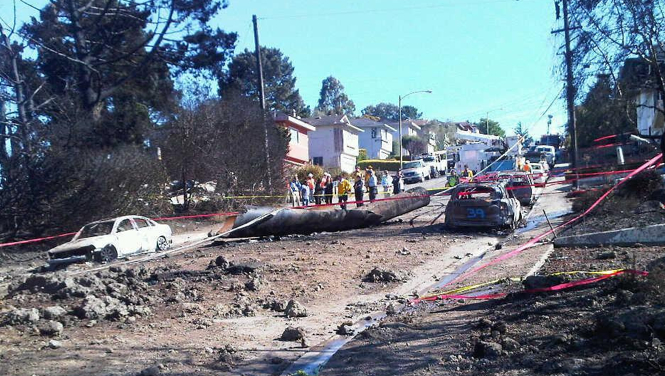
- Remains of a portion of the natural gas pipeline after the explosion
- Date: September 9, 2010
- Time: 18:11 UTC-7
- Location: San Bruno, California United States; 37°37′21″N 122°26′31″W
- Deaths: 8
- Injuries: 58

The San Bruno pipeline explosion occurred at 6:11 pm PDT on September 9, 2010, in San Bruno, California, when a 30-inch (76 cm) diameter steel natural gas pipeline owned by Pacific Gas & Electric (PG&E) exploded into flames in the Crestmoor residential neighborhood 2 miles (3.2 km) west of San Francisco International Airport near Skyline Boulevard and San Bruno Avenue. The loud roar and shaking led some residents of the area, first responders, and news media to initially believe that it was an earthquake or that a large airplane had crashed. It took crews nearly an hour to determine it was a gas pipeline explosion. As of September 29, 2010, the death toll was eight people. The United States Geological Survey registered the explosion and resulting shock wave as a magnitude 1.1 earthquake. Eyewitnesses reported the initial blast "shot a fireball more than 1,000 feet (300 m) in the air".

== Explosion and fire ==
At 6:11 pm PDT on September 9, 2010, a huge explosion occurred in the Crestmoor residential neighborhood of San Bruno, near Skyline Boulevard and San Bruno Avenue. This caused a fire, which quickly engulfed nearby houses. Emergency responders from San Bruno and nearby cities soon arrived at the scene and evacuated surrounding neighborhoods. Strong winds fanned the flames, hampering fire fighting efforts. The blaze was fed by a ruptured gas pipe, and large clouds of smoke soared into the sky. It took 60 to 90 minutes to shut off the gas after the explosion, according to San Bruno Fire Chief Dennis Haag. The explosion and resulting fire leveled either 35 or 37 houses and damaged at least 8 more, according to conflicting sources. Three of the damaged houses, deemed uninhabitable, were torn down the following December. About 200 firefighters battled the eight alarm fire that resulted from the explosions. The explosion excavated an asymmetric crater 167 feet (51 m) long, 26 feet (7.9 m) wide and 40 feet (12 m) deep along the sidewalk of Glenview Drive in front of 1701 Earl Avenue (a corner house), but many of the destroyed homes were eastward in the 1600 block of Claremont Drive.

The neighborhood continued to burn into the night even after the exploding gas main had been shut off

The fire continued to burn for several hours after the initial explosion. The explosion compromised a water main and required firefighters to truck in water from outside sources. Firefighters were assisted by residents who dragged fire hoses nearly 4,000 feet (1,200 m) to working hydrants. Ordinary citizens drove injured people and burn victims to the hospital. Mutual aid responded from all over the Bay Area, including the California Department of Forestry and Fire Protection who sent 25 fire engines, four airtankers, two air attack planes, and one helicopter. The fire was only fifty percent contained by 10 pm PDT and continued to burn until about 11:40 am PDT the next day.

As of September 29, 2010, the death toll was eight people. Among the eight deaths was 20-year-old Jessica Morales, who was with her boyfriend, Joseph Ruigomez, at the epicenter of the fire (his home) on the corner of Earl Ave. Despite his proximity to the epicenter of the fire, Ruigomez survived but spent nearly five months recovering in the Saint Francis Memorial Hospital Burn Center. Two other people at the Claremont address close to the explosion were among those killed: Jacqueline Greig, 44, and her daughter Janessa Greig, 13. Greig worked for the California Public Utilities Commission (CPUC), in a small unit that advocates for consumer rights pertaining to natural gas regulations. She had spent part of the summer evaluating PG&E's expansion plans and investment proposals to replace out-of-date pipelines. Also killed in the blast were Elizabeth Torres, 81, Lavonne Bullis, 82, Greg Bullis, 50, and Will Bullis, 17.

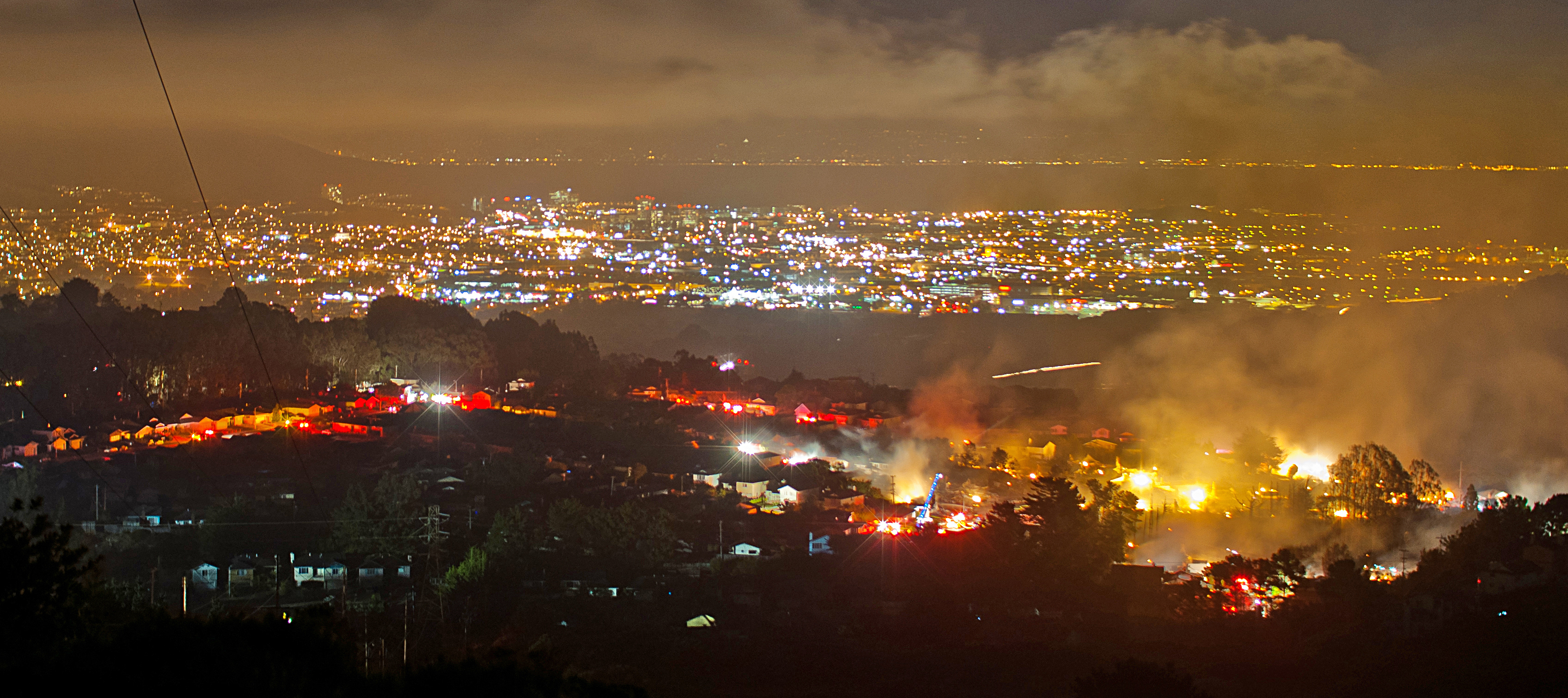
View of the fire on Sep. 9, 2010 at 11:31 pm PDT

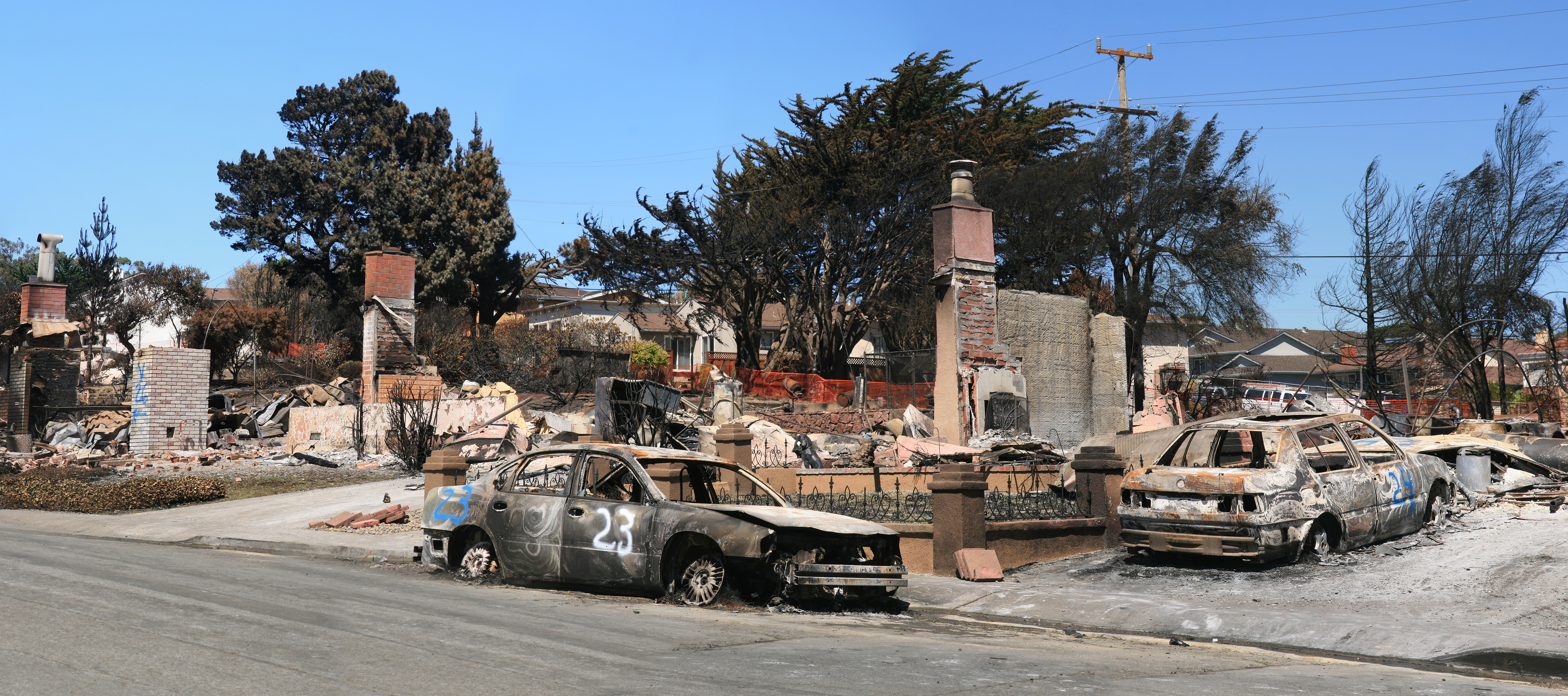
Destruction after fire and explosion in San Bruno

== Response ==
=== San Bruno ===
A Red Cross shelter was set up at the Veterans Memorial Recreation Center in San Bruno, and the Blood Centers of the Pacific issued an emergency appeal for blood donations. Some people were evacuated to Tanforan and Bayhill Shopping Centers. All elementary schools in the San Bruno Park Elementary School District, as well as Parkside Junior High, were closed on September 10. However, Capuchino High School remained open. Some residents who were evacuated from their homes were allowed to return to those undamaged on Sunday, September 12.

=== Pacific Gas and Electric Company ===
The Pacific Gas and Electric Company (PG&E) is the owner of the pipeline. On September 10, 2010, PG&E's president, Christopher Johns, said the company was not able to approach the source of the explosion to investigate the cause. An official press release issued by PG&E on September 10 reported the pipe was a 30-inch (76 cm) steel transmission line. Shares of PG&E stock fell eight percent on the Friday after the explosion, reducing the company's market capitalization by $1.57 billion.

PG&E also reduced their operating pressures by 20 percent after investigations revealed the pipeline may have been improperly installed.

After the San Bruno pipeline failure, PG&E was required to re-evaluate how it determines the maximum operating pressure for some 1,800 miles of pipeline throughout its system. Specifically, the CPUC asked PG&E officials to show their lines had been tested or examined in a way that could prove the pipeline can withstand the current maximum operating pressure. At the March 15, 2011 deadline for this report, PG&E was unable to provide documentation for details of some of its gas transmission pipelines.

In response to the disaster and a subsequent decision (D.11-06-017) by the CPUC, PG&E unveiled a plan in August 2011 to modernize and enhance safety of its gas transmission operations over several years, including automation of over 200 valves, strength-testing over 700 miles (1,100 km) of pipe, replacing 185 miles (298 km), and upgrading another 200 miles (320 km) or so to allow in-line inspection. The plan was divided into two phases. The first phase, scheduled to end in 2014, targeted pipeline segments in urban areas, those not built to modern standards, and those that had not been strength-tested. Project funding of $769 million was the subject of a PG&E application (R.11-02-019) for a three-year increase in gas rates starting January 2012.

On November 6, 2011, an explosion occurred near Woodside, California during strength testing of PG&E pipelines. The explosion caused a mudslide in the area; however, no casualties were reported.

=== California state government ===
Lieutenant Governor Abel Maldonado made a state of emergency declaration and signed an executive order to provide aid to victims. State regulators ordered PG&E to survey all natural gas lines the company controls in California. Governor Arnold Schwarzenegger visited the site several days later, after returning from a trade mission in Asia.

=== Federal government ===
U.S. Rep. Jackie Speier called the devastation "a very serious crisis" and was asking Federal Emergency Management Agency (FEMA) to declare it a national disaster area.

=== Use of technology ===
The San Bruno explosion was notable for the fact that local technology companies such as Cisco Systems and Google dispatched their emergency response teams to provide emergency communications and enhanced mapping information at the request of responders at the scene. Coordinated through the nonprofit InSTEDD (Innovative Support to Emergencies, Diseases, and Disasters), with support from the Carnegie Mellon University Disaster Management Initiative, a number of unaffiliated technology volunteers were requested to support many of the GIS (Geographic Information Systems) response efforts, coordinated through the Planning Section Chief.

== Investigation ==
San Bruno Police declared the area a crime scene to determine if foul play was involved. The National Transportation Safety Board (NTSB) began an investigation into the cause of the explosion. During the days prior to the explosion, some residents reported smelling natural gas in the area. A source within PG&E reported a break in natural gas line number 132 caused the explosion. At the time of the explosion, the pressure within that part of the pipeline was 386–386.4 psi (2.661–2.664 MPa). Although this was 11 psi (0.076 MPa) greater than PG&E's maximum rated operating pressure for that section of the pipeline, it was still 14 psi (0.097 MPa) below PG&E's specified maximum allowable rating of 400 psi (2.8 MPa). The gas line is a large 30-inch (76 cm) steel pipe. NTSB vice chairman Christopher Hart said at a briefing that the segment of pipe that blew out onto the street was 28 feet (8.5 m) long, the explosion sent that piece of pipe about 100 feet (30 m) and the blast created a crater 167 feet (51 m) long and 26 feet (7.9 m) wide, though the NTSB Pipeline Accident Report would later size the crater to be 72 feet (22 m) long and 26 feet (7.9 m) wide. He said that an inspection of the severed pipe chunk revealed that it was made of several smaller sections that had been welded together and that a seam ran its length. The presence of the welds did not necessarily indicate the pipe had been repaired, he said. Newer pipelines are usually manufactured into the shape needed for these applications, rather than having multiple weaker welded sections that could potentially leak or break.

In January 2011, federal investigators reported that they found numerous defective welds in the pipeline. The thickness of the pipe varied, and some welds did not penetrate the pipes completely. As PG&E increased the pressure in the pipes to meet growing energy demand, the defective welds were further weakened until their failure. As the pipeline was installed in 1956, modern testing methods such as X-rays were not available to detect the problem at that time.

The NTSB held a 3-day public hearing on March 1 through 3, 2011, to gather additional facts for the ongoing investigation of the pipeline rupture and explosion.

Parties to the public hearing included:

- Pacific Gas & Electric
- California Public Utilities Commission (CPUC)
- Pipeline and Hazardous Materials Safety Administration (PHMSA)
- The City of San Bruno
- International Brotherhood of Electrical Workers Local 1245

The NTSB also published call logs from the Milpitas PG&E gas terminal to a gas control center. An uninterruptible power supply (UPS) replacement was started at the Milpitas terminal several hours before the San Bruno explosion.

It was revealed that PG&E had done pipeline replacement work on Line 132 along parts of the San Andreas Fault zone, near this area, to reduce the likelihood of the pipeline failing from an earthquake. However, the replacement was stopped short of the area that failed in 2010.

On January 13, 2012, an independent audit from the State of California issued a report stating that PG&E had illegally diverted over $100 million from a fund used for safety operations, and instead used it for executive compensation and bonuses.

== Litigation ==
=== Private party ===
Through more than 20 law firms, over 100 plaintiffs have sued Pacific Gas and Electric and/or its parent, PG&E Corporation, in the Superior Courts of California in over 70 separate lawsuits. Virtually all were filed in the local state court, the Superior Court of California for the County of San Mateo. All the cases were consolidated and transferred to Judge Steven L. Dylina on March 4, 2011, and designated as Judicial Council Coordinated Proceeding (JCCP) No. 4648, PG&E "San Bruno Fire" Cases. On June 3, 2011, the plaintiffs filed a consolidated Master Complaint.

On July 5, 2011, PG&E's lawyers filed their Answer to the Master Complaint. A week later, the San Francisco Chronicle ran a front-page story attacking the defendants for invoking certain routine defenses in their answer, like state-of-the-art and comparative negligence.

In July 2012, the plaintiffs lodged a deposition in San Mateo County Superior Court claiming that PG&E management ignored employee concerns about GIS data inaccuracies that impeded inspection of the pipeline.

In September 2013, PG&E settled the claims of 347 victims. PG&E had previously settled with 152 victims; the additional settlements brought the total payment to $565 million for 499 victims. Two victims' lawsuits remained after the settlement, but newspapers later reported the $565 million figure as the final settlement for all victim claims. PG&E stated in its 2015 annual report that it had paid $558 million in third-party claims, and $92 million in legal costs, and received $515 million from insurance.

=== State of California ===
In October 2012, public hearings on the San Bruno pipeline blast at the CPUC were suspended for state regulators and PG&E to strike a deal about the fines. Rene Morales, mother of Jessica Morales who was burned alive and one of eight people that was killed in the fire requested that California Governor Jerry Brown appoint a new president of the California PUC. Also in October 2012, former Senator George J. Mitchell was chosen to lead talks in the settlement of fines in the explosion. In December 2012 the CPUC decided that 55% of the long term costs for PG&E pipeline inspection and safety upgrades of $229 million will be borne by electricity rate payers.

On September 16, 2014, the San Francisco Chronicle reported that Carol Brown, the chief of staff for the president of the CPUC, had communicated with PG&E executives to help move litigation to judges they expected would be friendly to PG&E's side. As of October 2014 the judge shopping scandal is under federal investigation. In 2018, the CPUC fined PG&E $92.5 million for improper communication with CPUC commissioners and staff.

On April 9, 2015, the Public Utilities Commission fined PG&E $1.6 billion.

=== Federal ===
On April 1, 2014, PG&E was indicted by a federal grand jury in United States District Court for the Northern District of California for multiple violations of the Natural Gas Pipeline Safety Act of 1968 relating to its record keeping and pipeline "integrity management" practices. An additional indictment was issued by the grand jury on July 29, 2014, charging the company with obstruction of justice for lying to the NTSB regarding its pipeline testing policy, bringing the total number of counts in the indictment to 28. Under the new indictment, the company could be fined as much as $1.3 billion, based on profit associated with the alleged misconduct, in addition to $2.5 billion for state regulatory violations.

On January 21, 2017, PG&E was fined $3 million and ordered to perform 10,000 hours of community service for criminal actions of violating the Natural Gas Pipeline Safety Act and for obstruction of justice. In addition, it must institute a compliance and ethics monitoring program and spend up to $3 million to "publicize its criminal conduct". These actions were imposed after the company was found guilty by a federal jury in August 2016 of six of the twelve charges against the company in US District Court.

=== Shareholders ===
In 2017, PG&E settled a shareholder class action lawsuit alleging "gross mismanagement" by agreeing to have its insurance company pay PG&E $90 million, and to budget $32 million for safety and governance improvements.

== Media coverage ==
Brigham McCown, the former head for the federal Pipeline and Hazardous Materials Safety Administration, called for the creation of a national commission to examine the problems surrounding high-pressure fuel pipelines that have been built in residential areas. McCown says it often takes an "incident like this one to force change." He also suggested installing a "no man's land" around some pipelines in hopes of preventing another disaster.

On September 9, 2012, a memorial to the victims was unveiled in the San Bruno City Park.

== See also ==
- List of pipeline accidents
