= Brigham McCown =

American lawyer

Brigham A. McCown
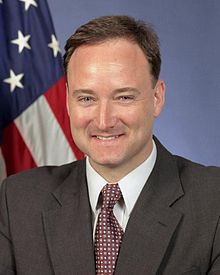
- McCown in 2005
- Born: July 3, 1966 (age 60)
- Education: College of William and Mary; Stanford University; Miami University; Northern Kentucky University
- Military career
- Allegiance: United States of America
- Branch: U.S. Maritime Administration; United States Navy
- Service years: 1984–2013
- Rank: Honorary Rear Admiral (LH) United States Maritime Administration; Commander United States Navy
- Conflicts: Operation Desert Storm, Operation Uphold Democracy, Operation Unified Assistance
- Other work: Senior Advisor USDOT Acting Administrator PHMSA Chief Counsel FMCSA

Brigham A. McCown (born July 3, 1966) is an American business executive and former government official.

He is a Senior Fellow at Hudson Institute in Washington, DC and a Clinical Professor at Miami University. From 2020 to 2022, McCown was chief executive of the Alyeska Pipeline Service Company which designed, built, operates, and maintains the Trans-Alaska Pipeline System.

== Early life and education ==
McCown grew up in rural southern Ohio, graduating from Ironton High School in 1984. Thereafter, he attended Miami University in Oxford, Ohio, where he graduated in 1988 with a Bachelor of Arts degree in diplomacy and foreign affairs and obtained a Juris Doctor degree from Northern Kentucky University Salmon P. Chase College of Law in 1997. In 2015, he earned a graduate certificate from Stanford University in Energy Innovation and Emerging Technologies, and in 2019, an MBA from the College of William and Mary.

== Career ==
McCown is a Senior Fellow at the Hudson Institute in Washington, a position he has held since 2022. He was president of Alyeska Pipeline Service Company stepping down from this role in January 2022 after apparent disagreements with the company's new board.

McCown was an advisor to the 2016 presidential transition as a core member of the president-elect Donald Trump's infrastructure policy and agency action teams. He then was a senior advisor to Secretary of Transportation Elaine Chao (R-KY) during her initial days in office but declined a permanent appointment.

Until 2007, McCown worked in several leadership roles during both terms of George W. Bush's presidency in Washington D.C. Appointed initially to the U.S. Senior Executive Service by Democratic Transportation Secretary Norman Y. Mineta, (D-CA) he was later reappointed by Republican Transportation Secretary Mary Peters, (R-AZ). McCown initially worked as the first chief counsel (general counsel) of the Federal Motor Carrier Safety Administration (FMCSA), where he was responsible for legal oversight of the nation's trucking, motor coach, moving industry and NAFTA. During this time, he advocated for stronger truck and bus safety regulations, including better oversight of the commercial bus industry and the requirement for all buses to be equipped with seat belts.

Mineta then appointed McCown to become the first acting administrator and first deputy administrator of the Pipeline and Hazardous Materials Safety Administration (PHMSA). During his tenure he was responsible for oversight of over one million daily shipments of hazardous materials by land, sea, and air including the nation's 2.6 million miles of pipelines. McCown was instrumental in restoring national critical infrastructure following Hurricanes Katrina and Rita and received the department's highest award (gold medal) for his actions while operating under a secretarial designation. He also oversaw the government's initial response to the largest oil spill on Alaska's North Slope and implemented the one call damage prevention program known as "811". While the country's chief energy transportation regulator, McCown was first to raise concerns over the country's aging pipeline infrastructure network but was also avid in his support of pipelines over other transport methods. He has continued to advance safety and has called for tougher standards following gas pipeline incidents in San Bruno, California, and Dallas, Texas.

He was also one of the first experts to call for the phasing out older rail cars transporting crude oil known as DOT-111 tank cars.

From 1988 to 1998 McCown served on active duty as a U.S. naval officer and as a naval aviator and participated in worldwide deployments including Operation Desert Storm and Operation Uphold Democracy. From 1998 until his retirement in 2013, McCown was a member of the active ready reserve with assignments in Europe, Africa, and Asia including Operation Unified Assistance.

Since retiring from federal service, McCown was the Chairman and CEO of Nouveau, a consulting and advisory firm based in Dallas, Texas. He previously was on the Southlake, Texas Planning & Zoning Commission where he notably voted against a new natural gas pipeline within the city's limits.

He board participation include vice chair (regulatory and legal subcommittee) of the federal government's Commercial Space Transportation Advisory Committee, a member of the Salmon P. Chase College of Law's Board of Visitors, Co-Chair of the American Bar Association's Transportation Committee of the Administrative and Regulatory Law Section, member of the board of directors of the Institute for Strategic Risk and Security, a Program Council Member for the Warsaw Security Forum, a member of Europe's Pipeline Technology Conference safety advisory committee, founder and board member of the Alliance for Innovation and Infrastructure, and a Fellow of the American Bar Association Foundation.
