= Cynthia L. Quarterman =

American lawyer and engineer

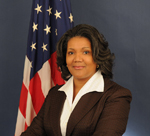
- Quarterman in 2011

Administrator of the Pipeline and Hazardous Materials Safety Administration
- In office November 16, 2009 – October 4, 2014
- President: Barack Obama
- Preceded by: Carl T. Johnson
- Succeeded by: Marie Therese Dominguez

Personal details
- Education: Columbia Law School 1987, Northwestern University, 1983

Cynthia L. Quarterman is an American lawyer and engineer, former Director of the Minerals Management Service and Administrator of the Pipeline and Hazardous Materials Safety Administration from 2009 until her resignation on October 4, 2014.

== Early life and education ==
Quarterman was born to the late Bernice and Rudolph Quarterman in Savannah, Georgia. She attended A. E. Beach High School, where she graduated with honors in 1979. She studied Industrial Engineering and graduated with a B.S. from Northwestern University in 1983, and worked for a year as an engineer for IBM in Owego, New York. In 1987, she obtained a J.D. degree from the Columbia University School of Law. While at Columbia, she had served as Executive Editor of the Columbia Journal of Environmental Law.

== Career ==
In 1988, Quarterman joined Steptoe & Johnson LLP in Washington, D.C. before joining government service. From 1992 to 1995, she served in various capacities at Department of Interior, including as deputy director of MMS, and as a member of the Office of Surface Mining's Interim Management Team.

She was Director of the Minerals Management Service in the US Department of the Interior from March 1995 to March 1999 during the Clinton Administration. In that capacity, she administered the programs to manage the mineral resources located on the nation's Outer Continental Shelf, including leasing, exploration, development, and production of oil, natural gas, sulfur, and other minerals, and to collect and distribute revenues for oil, gas, coal, geothermal, and mineral development on Federal and Indian lands. She was responsible for ensuring compliance with many environmental laws, including the National Environmental Policy Act, the Clean Air Act, the Coastal Zone Management Act, and the Endangered Species Act.

In September 1999, she returned to Steptoe & Johnson LLP as a partner in the Regulatory & Industry Affairs department focusing on litigation and administrative law. She litigated and advised clients on matters associated with pipeline safety, royalty valuation, federal land minerals management, pipeline acquisitions, Outer Continental Shelf (OCS) oil and natural gas facilities, the jurisdictional status of pipeline assets, as well as surface transportation, alternative energy and telecommunications.

Quarterman was a member of the Obama Administration Transition Team at the US Department of Energy. On August 14, 2009, she was nominated by President Barack Obama as Administrator of the Pipeline and Hazardous Materials Safety Administration, confirmed by the US Senate on November 5, 2009, and sworn in by Transportation Secretary Ray LaHood. She resigned on October 4, 2014.

Since 2014, she has been a Distinguished Fellow at The Atlantic Council's Global Energy Center.

== Personal life ==
She is married to Pantelis Michalopoulos, a partner at Steptoe & Johnson. They have a daughter, Charis. They currently reside in Washington, D.C. .
