= Dernard E. Quarterman =

American politician (1852–1887)

Dernard E. Quarterman (1852 - May 1887) was an American Christian minister and politician.

Qiarterman was a pastor in the African Methodist Episcopal church.

He served as a constable for Lee County in 1873 and 1874. He received 3,027 votes in 1877, and won election to the Florida House of Representatives from Leon County.
