= Pipeline and Hazardous Materials Safety Administration =

United States government agency

- Seal of the United States Department of Transportation

- Logo of the PHMSA

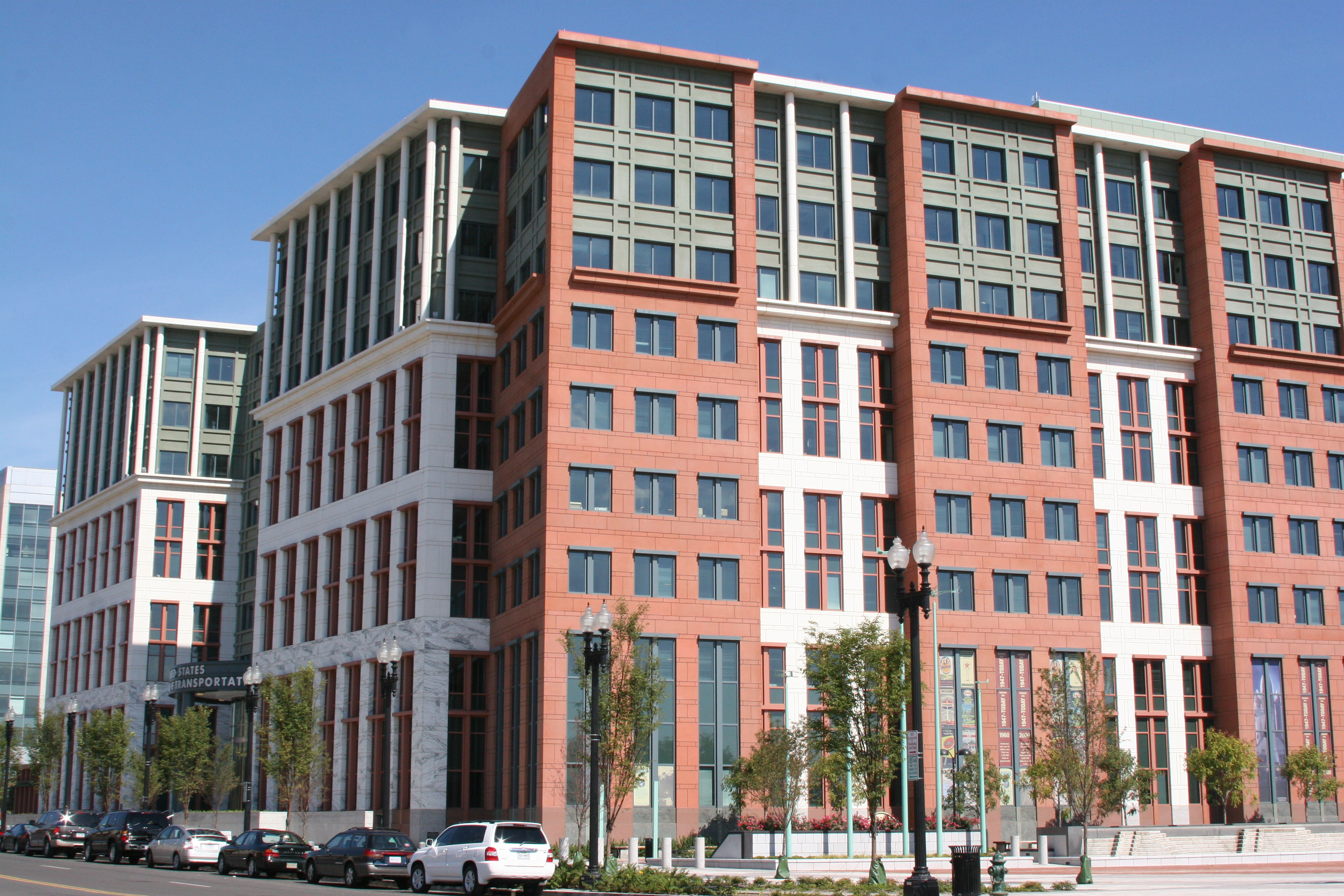
- Headquarters of the Pipeline and Hazardous Materials Safety Administration

Department overview
- Formed: July 1, 2004; 22 years ago
- Jurisdiction: Federal government of the United States
- Headquarters: 1200 New Jersey Avenue, SE, Washington, D.C. 20590; 38°52′32.92″N 77°0′10.26″W
- Employees: 500 (approx.) (Nov. 2017)
- Annual budget: $244.5 million USD (FY2015, enacted)
- Department executives: Paul Roberti, Administrator; Ben Kochman, Deputy Administrator
- Parent department: United States Department of Transportation
- Child agencies: Office of Pipeline Safety; Office of Hazardous Materials Safety
- Website: phmsa.dot.gov

The Pipeline and Hazardous Materials Safety Administration (PHMSA) is a United States Department of Transportation agency created in 2004, responsible for developing and enforcing regulations for the safe, reliable, and environmentally sound transportation of energy and other hazardous materials. The agency is in charge of overseeing roughly 3.4 million miles of pipelines, accounting for 65% of the energy consumed in the U.S., and regulating the nearly one million daily shipments of hazardous materials by land, sea, and air. This includes pipelines carrying carbon dioxide carbon capture and utilization.

PHMSA's safety programs are housed in the Office of Pipeline Safety (OPS) and the Office of Hazardous Materials Safety (OHMS). PHMSA is headquartered in Washington, D.C.

PHMSA was created within the U.S. Department of Transportation under the Norman Y. Mineta Research and Special Programs Improvement Act of 2004, which then-United States president George W. Bush signed into law on November 30, 2004. Its mission is to protect people and the environment by advancing the safe transportation of energy and other hazardous materials that are essential to the people's daily lives.

== History ==
Prior to 2005 the U.S. Department of Transportation had no focused research organization and no separately operating administration for pipeline safety and hazardous materials transportation safety in the United States. The Norman Y. Mineta Research and Special Programs Improvement Act of 2004 provided these, with an opportunity to establish mode government budget and information practices in support of then president George Bush's "Management Agenda" initiatives. Prior to the Special Programs Act of 2004, PHMSA's hazmat and pipeline safety programs were housed within the Transportation Department's Research and Special Programs Administration, known as RSPA.

== Office of Hazardous Materials Safety ==
The Office of Hazardous Materials Safety is responsible for the oversight of the safe transportation of hazardous materials by air, rail, highway, and vessel. More than 3.3 billion tons of hazardous materials valued at more than $1.9 trillion are transported annually by air, highway, rail, and vessel across the United States. On average, more than 1.2 million hazardous materials shipments occur every day. This includes everything from nuclear waste to lithium-ion batteries, to explosives used in excavation, mining, and energy production.

The program establishes policy, standards and regulations for classifying, packaging, hazard communication, handling, training and transporting hazardous materials via air, highway, rail and vessel. The program uses inspection, enforcement, outreach and incident analysis in efforts to reduce incidents, minimize fatalities and injuries, mitigate the consequences of incidents that occur, train and prepare first responders, and enhance safety.

== Office of Pipeline Safety ==
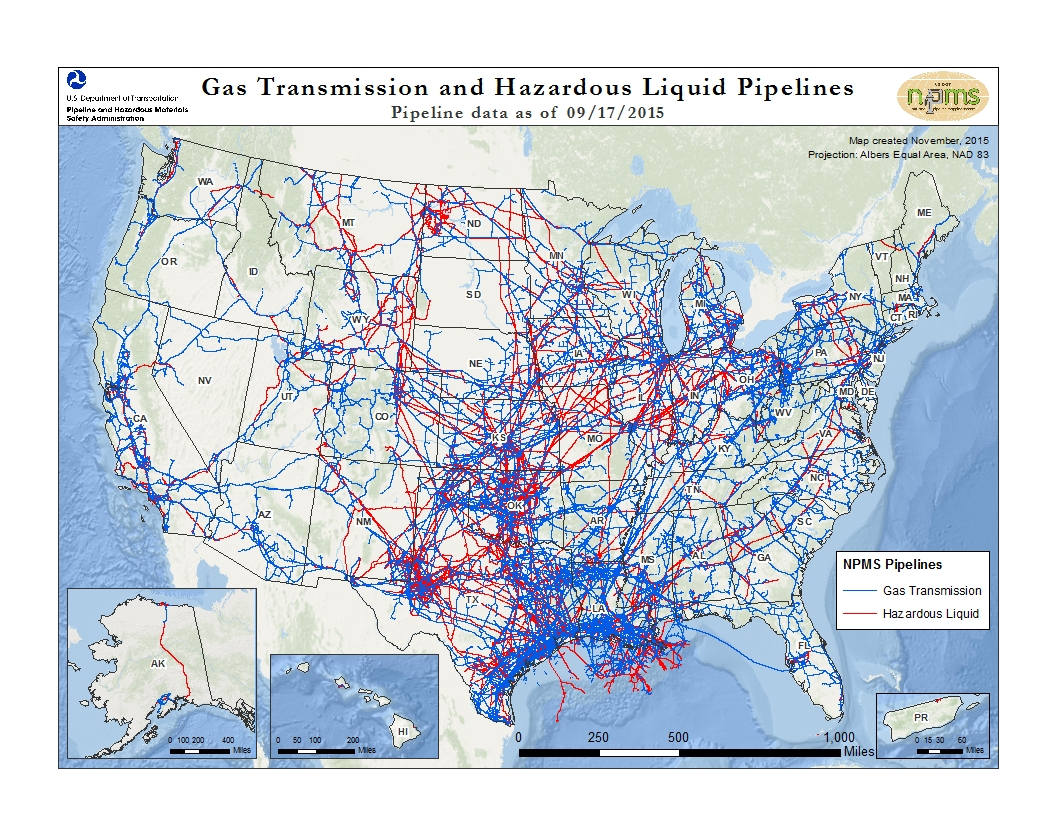
A map of pipelines in the United States as of September, 2015. Red is hazardous liquid pipelines, including crude oil.

As of 2022, the Office of Pipeline Safety regulated an expansive network of about 3.4 million miles of natural gas pipeline system in the United States and its hazardous liquid pipelines. This includes 229,000 miles of hazardous liquid pipelines, 302,000 miles of gas transmission pipelines, 2,284,000 miles of gas distribution mains and services, and 17,000 miles of gas-gathering pipelines. PHMSA’s pipeline safety program promotes the safe delivery of energy products to market in a manner that protects people, property, and the environment.

The Office of Pipeline Safety is headquartered in Washington, D.C., with eight field offices located in West Trenton, New Jersey; Atlanta, GA; Kansas City, Missouri; Houston, Texas; Lakewood, Colorado; Des Plaines, Illinois; Ontario, California; and Anchorage, Alaska. PHMSA also operates a national training center and accident investigation office located in Oklahoma City.

In 2022, the PMHSA admitted that CO_{2} pipelines were underregulated and announced "new measures to strengthen its safety oversight".

== Leadership ==
Name	Position	Sworn in
Paul Roberti	Director	2025
Ben Kochman	Deputy Director	2025

Past leadership includes

- Brigham McCown, first acting administrator from July 1, 2005 - March 31, 2006 and first Deputy Administrator, July 1, 2005 until January 1, 2007.
- Thomas J. Barrett, first permanent Administrator from March 31, 2006 - June 1, 2007.
- Stacey Gerard, first Assistant Administrator/Chief Safety Officer, first acting Deputy Administrator until July 1, 2005.
- Krista Edwards, Chief Counsel in 2006, Deputy Administrator, acting Administrator from June 1, 2007 to January 9, 2008.
- Carl T. Johnson, Administrator from January 9, 2008 - January 2009.
- Cynthia L. Quarterman, Administrator from November 16, 2009 - October 4, 2014
- Timothy Butters, acting Administrator from October 4, 2014 - June 8, 2015
- Marie Therese Dominguez, Administrator from October 7, 2015 - January 20, 2017
- Howard R. Elliott, Administrator from October 30, 2017 - January 20, 2021
- Tristan Brown, Deputy Administrator, acting Administrator January 20, 2021 - January 20, 2025
- Howard "Mac" McMillan, Executive Director, acting Administrator January 20, 2025 - January 30, 2025
- Ben Kochman, Deputy Administrator, Acting Administrator January 30, 2025 - September 25, 2025
- Paul Roberti, Administrator, September 25, 2025 - Present

== See also ==
- List of North American natural gas pipelines
- List of pipeline accidents in the United States in the 21st century
- Weld monitoring, testing and analysis
- Robotic Non-Destructive Testing
- Intelligent pigging
- Emergency Response Guidebook
