= List of pipeline accidents in the United States in the 1970s =

The following is a list of pipeline accidents in the United States in the 1970s. It is one of several lists of U.S. pipeline accidents. See also: list of natural gas and oil production accidents in the United States.

== Incidents ==
This is not a complete list of all pipeline accidents. For natural gas alone, the Pipeline and Hazardous Materials Safety Administration (PHMSA), a United States Department of Transportation agency, has collected data on more than 3,200 accidents deemed serious or significant since 1987.

A "significant incident" results in any of the following consequences:

- Fatality or injury requiring in-patient hospitalization.
- $50,000 or more in total costs, measured in 1984 dollars.
- Liquid releases of five or more barrels (42 US gal/barrel).
- Releases resulting in an unintentional fire or explosion.

PHMSA and the National Transportation Safety Board (NTSB) post-incident data and results of investigations into accidents involving pipelines that carry a variety of products, including natural gas, oil, diesel fuel, gasoline, kerosene, jet fuel, carbon dioxide, and other substances. Occasionally pipelines are re-purposed to carry different products.

=== 1970 ===
- January 11 – A home exploded in Bowling Green, Kentucky, killing a man. Contractor damage to a gas line was suspected.
- January 17 – Workers from Buckeye Partners ignited a fire to burn off petroleum from a leaking pipeline near Warren, Ohio. The fire grew out of control for several hours, requiring 100 fire-fighters to help contain the blaze. One pipeline employee was injured.
- January 24 – A leaking 2-inch natural gas main exploded in Houma, Louisiana, killing two gas company workers, one firefighter, injuring 28 others, and demolishing half a block of downtown buildings. The workers were attempting to repair the gas line.
- February 5 – A jet fuel pipeline leaked, and contaminated 50 to 60 acres of farm and pasture land near Lakeland, Florida. Some wildlife was killed, and a small fire broke out in the fuel.
- April 19 – An 8-inch pipeline broke near Wauseon, Ohio, spilling Number 2 fuel oil into the Maumee River, and endangering the water supply for several cities for a time.
- July 15 – A 30-inch welded gas pipeline rolled into the trench and killed 20-year-old Art Greminger who had only been working since July 12. He was employed by a contractor out of Cape Girardeau, Missouri, laying the pipeline for Mississippi River Fuel Transmission Co., in more recent years called Center Point Energy.
- September 2 – Early in the day, residents of Jacksonville, Maryland, detected gasoline odors and noticed gasoline in a small creek flowing beneath a nearby road. Because fumes were still present in the late afternoon of September 2, a resident notified Colonial Pipeline at 6:19 p.m. about the situation. About 12 hours later, on the morning of September 3, an explosion and fire occurred in a ditch in which contractor personnel for Colonial were manually digging to further expose the pipeline and catch gasoline trickling from the ground. Five persons were injured, none fatally. The NTSB later pointed out that workers had failed to use a flammable vapor percent detector during the work. The leak point was found four days later. The failure resulted in a release of 30,186 gallons (718 barrels) of gasoline and kerosene.
- September 7 – A pipeline leaked thousands of gallons of gasoline onto farmland near Ontario, Oregon. Roads were closed in the area until the gasoline was removed.
- December 9 – A Phillips Petroleum Company propane pipeline leaked, in Franklin County, Missouri, causing the 1970 propane vapor cloud explosion in Port Hudson. The leak led to a propane cloud explosion, with a force estimated up to 50 tons of TNT. The NTSB cited past external and internal corrosion issues, and poor welds on the uncoated pipeline as concerns.
- December – The explosion of a 30-inch 1100 psi inlet natural gas pipeline, bringing offshore natural gas into a gas-drying plant in southern Louisiana. Two plant personnel were killed. Rupture was at a junction of a 12-inch gas line to the 30-inch main line.
- December 11 – A restaurant owner opened a gas line valve in New York, New York, not knowing that part of the gas line was open and unconnected. The gas in the building exploded, killing fifteen people, and injuring more than 60 others.
- December 17 – A Mid-Valley pipeline leaked, spilling 250,000 gallons of crude oil onto that companies' land in Dayton, Ohio. There were no injuries or fire.
- December 28 – A 12-inch pipeline ruptured in Jackson, Wisconsin, spilling 200 barrels (32 m^{3}) of fuel oil into a wildlife sanctuary.

=== 1971 ===
- A faulty valve on a 3-inch natural gas pipeline was suspected of causing a gas leak that resulted in three separate explosions, including a house explosion in Lambertville, New Jersey that killed seven people.
- January 27 - an explosion and fire from a gas main failure in West Conshohocken, Pennsylvania killed 4 people, and destroyed 15 homes.
- April 17 – A road grader hit a gas transmission pipeline in Mississippi, resulting in fatal burns to the grader operator. Later, it was found the pipeline only had 5 to 6 inches of soil cover in the area.
- June 5 – An ammonia pipeline failed near Floral, Arkansas, releasing 80 tons of ammonia. A 6-year-old boy had to be hospitalized, cattle were killed or blinded, and 10,000 acres of trees had leaf scorching from the ammonia. Delays were made in notifying Arkansas State Department of Pollution Control and Ecology.
- July 8 – A six-inch crude oil gathering pipeline ruptured near Flat Rock, Illinois. Crude oil spilled in the Embarras River, extending 10 miles along it. There were no injuries.
- July 30 – A Sunoco gasoline pipeline leaked 11,000 gallons of gasoline near Ambler, Pennsylvania. Gasoline fumes built up in the basements of nearby homes, but there were no injuries reported.
- August 20 – Around that day, a Mobil six inch crude oil pipeline leaked near Stafford, New York. About 16,800 gallons of crude oil was slowly released, evading leak detection. Some water wells in the area were at risk.
- October 4 – Two gas explosions occurred in North Richland Hills, Texas. Gas migrated into two homes from leaking gas pipes.
- November 17 – A gas company repair crew was overcome in a service vault in Pittsburgh, Pennsylvania. Two workmen were overcome initially, and four others attempting to rescue them were also overcome by gas asphyxiation. All six died.

=== 1972 ===
- January 7 – A huge explosion and fire occurred on a 24-inch gas transmission pipeline west of Centerville, Iowa. The fire was visible for far around. There were no injuries or major property damage.
- January 12 – The second pipeline leak in a month into the Tippecanoe River in Indiana on a Buckeye Pipeline company (now Buckeye Partners ) line hit on January 12. The Buckeye Pipeline was owned by the bankrupt Penn Central Railroad, preventing money from being spent on repairs. One EPA official stated "they know they have a leaky system".
- January 11 – A 10-inch pipeline ruptured in Clinton, Montana, spilling 3,000 barrels (480 m^{3}) of diesel fuel, with some of it reaching the Clark Fork River.
- January 28 – The rupture of a 20-inch gas pipeline shut down most of the gas supply for Joplin, Missouri. An estimated 25,000 people were affected.
- January 29 – During the blowdown of a dehydrator, LPG fumes caught fire at Conway, Kansas, killing a pipeline company worker.
- February 2 – A Colonial Pipeline pipeline ruptured in Cobb County, Georgia, spilling about 2,000 gallons of fuel oil into the Chattahoochee River upstream of a water intake for the city of Atlanta. Much work went into keeping the spill from the water intake. There were no injuries.
- February 12 – A Conoco pipeline rupture spilled 16,000 US gallons (61,000 L) of diesel fuel into the Spokane River near Spokane, Washington.
- March 24 – A 2-inch steel gas main was pulled out of a compression coupling, at Annandale, Virginia, causing a leak. Natural gas later exploded, killing three people, injuring one other person, and, destroying two homes.
- May 14 – A shutdown, closed-in 8-inch pipeline owned by the Exxon Pipe Line Company ruptured near Hearne, Texas. Crude oil at an initial pressure of 530 p.s.i.g. sprayed from a 6-inch irregular split on top of the pipe. The crude oil flowed along a small stream and was dammed up 1 foot deep in a stock pond 1,800 feet from the leak. At 5 a.m., vapors from the crude oil, which continued to leak from the rupture, entered a small frame house 600 feet away and were somehow ignited. The resultant explosion killed one person, seriously burned two others, destroyed the house, melted nearby communication lines, and scorched an 1,800-foot-long area. An estimated 332,346 gallons of crude burned.
- June 15 – A crew was welding on a gas main in Bryan, Ohio that had been shut off, when someone inadvertently opened a valve that fed gas into that main. The gas ignited, and exploded, seriously injuring two workers.
- June 20 – A 12-inch diameter high-pressure propane pipeline, near Butler, Alabama, was ruptured by a road grader. A short time after the line was ruptured, a car drove into the vapor cloud. The car stalled, and trying to restart it was suspected to have ignited the vapor cloud, killing four people.
- August 9 – Heavy equipment ruptured a butane pipeline near Houston, Texas. One person was injured.
- August 15 – Two pipeline workers were injured when a lid on a pipeline pig trap blew off of a gas pipeline, near Barstow, Texas. A fire followed.
- September 5 – A gasoline pipeline ruptured and ignited at a Plantation Pipeline Terminal in Bremen, Georgia. For a time, there were fears the fire might spread to nearby fuel storage tanks, but the fire was limited to the pipeline.
- September 26 A 10-inch crude oil pipeline ruptured and burned, next to pipeline terminal, in Midland, Texas. There were no injuries reported, and 2 pick up trucks & a pipeline metering station were damaged.
- October 10
  - A crude oil spill was spotted coming from a leaking oil pipeline off of Grand Isle, Louisiana. About 8,000 barrels of crude were spilled.
  - A Texas-New Mexico Pipeline Company crude oil pipeline ruptured near Shiprock, New Mexico, spilling 285,000 US gallons (1,080,000 L) of crude oil into the San Juan River, polluting it for 100 miles. Later, it was discovered that the pipeline company had increased pressure on the pipeline before the rupture to make up for an earlier pipeline shut down.
- October 30 – A bulldozer working on a power company construction project ruptured a gas main in Lake City, Minnesota. Leaking gas accumulated, then exploded, in a nearby variety store, killing six and injuring nine.
- November 15 – A 24-inch diameter natural gas pipeline rupture ejected a 30-foot section of pipe, which was followed by fire, near Abbeville, Louisiana. There were no injuries reported.
- November 18 – A leak in a weld on a 36-inch gas transmission pipeline in Bend, Oregon forced the shutdown of gas service to 3,000 customers.

=== 1973 ===
- January 10 – An abandoned farm near Bellingham, Washington was coated in crude oil, when a Trans-Mountain 16-inch pipeline failed. Over 300,000 gallons of crude were recovered.
- February 2 – Leaking natural gas led to an explosion and fire, that leveled two buildings, and damaged a third building, in Eagle Grove, Iowa. 12 people died.
- February 7 – A cracked gas main leaked in Adamsville, Alabama, on February 7. The escaping gas exploded, killing three people and injuring two others. A string of other gas main cracking incidents occurred in this city, killing one other person, and injuring two more.
- February 21 – Installation of a sewer was suspected of damaging a gas line in Coopersburg, Pennsylvania. Leaking gas later exploded in an apartment building, killing five people, injuring 22 others, and destroying the building.
- February 22 – In Austin, Texas, a 19-inch natural gas liquids (NGL) pipeline ruptured, due to an improper weld. A passing truck appeared to set off a vapor cloud explosion and fire. Six people were killed, and two others injured.
- March 20 – A butane pipeline burst in Portland, Texas, causing 50 families to evacuate. There was no fire or injuries.
- May 2 – A Yellowstone Pipeline 10-inch line ruptured, in Murray, Idaho, causing a mist of diesel fuel to cover homes and trailers. About 170,000 gallons of fuel were spilled. Some of the fuel reached a nearby creek. There was no fire.
- May 3 – Improper sampling procedures on an LPG pipeline killed one worker, and injured another, from freezing at Dayton, Ohio.
- June 2 – An Exxon 12-inch crude oil pipeline started leaking at the Atchafalaya River near Melville, Louisiana.
- In the summer, a pipeline ruptured in Diamond, Louisiana. The escaping gas fumes were ignited by a lawnmower, killing two people.
- June 27 – A Buckeye Partners pipeline failed near Findlay, Ohio, spilling about 150,000 US gallons (570,000 L) of jet aviation fuel into the Ottawa Creek and the Blanchard River, killing fish and plants. A failed gasket caused the spill.
- July 4 – A gas main explosion set off an apartment house fire in Long Beach, California, burning two persons. Two others who jumped from windows also were injured. The explosion, which occurred after 8:30 p.m., ripped a 40-foot hole in the street and sent flames into the fifteen-unit structure.
- August 29 – An 8-inch gas pipeline failed in Memphis, Tennessee, forcing over 100 people to evacuate the area. There was no fire.
- October 18 – A crude oil pipeline ruptured in Los Angeles, California. Crude oil flowed along several streets for a time.
- November 13 – A Buckeye Partners pipeline leaked, spilling gasoline into a Marion Township, Berks County, Pennsylvania creek.
- December 4 – A pipeline break released 31,000 barrels (4,900 m^{3}) of oil near Argyle, Minnesota. The cause was a failure in a longitudinal weld.
- December 6 – A pump station on an ammonia pipeline near Conway, Kansas, was started against a closed valve, and the pipeline failed in a previously damaged section. Two persons who drove through the ammonia vapors were hospitalized; several rural residents were evacuated from the area and 89,796 US gallons (339,910 L) of anhydrous ammonia were lost.

=== 1974 ===
- January 1 – A 22-inch natural gas transmission pipeline failed in Prairie du Rocher, Illinois. The resulting fire caused no serious damage, but 7,000 people in the area were left without gas heating for several sub-freezing days.
- January 25 – A pipeline failed near Liberty, Texas, spilling about 200 barrels of oil into the Trinity River.
- March 2 – A 30-inch gas pipeline failed at 797 pounds pressure inside a 34-inch casing pipe under a road near Monroe, Louisiana. 10 acres of forest were burned, but there were no injuries or deaths. A substandard girth weld was the cause. The failure of automatic valves on the pipeline to close upon a pressure drop was also cited as contributing to the size of the accident.
- March 15 – A gas transmission pipeline ruptured near Farmington, New Mexico, killing a family of three in a truck driving nearby when the gas ignited. Corrosion along the longitudinal seem weld of the pipe section caused the failure.
- April 22 – A gas line in a commercial building in New York, New York, was ruptured by falling equipment in a basement. The escaping gas later exploded, injuring more than 70 people.
- May 3 – A previously damaged gas main ruptured in Philadelphia, Pennsylvania, causing an explosion that killed two, and caused extensive damage to four row homes. Earlier plumbing work was thought to have caused the gas line damage.
- May 21
  - A 6-inch gas-gathering pipeline ruptured at the edge of a rural road south of Meridian, Mississippi. Three vehicles entered the area which contained the escaping gas, and stalled near the rupture. The gas ignited at 10:05 p.m., and five persons died as a result. The three vehicles were destroyed and 40 acres (160,000 m^{2}) of woodland were burned. Although less than four years old, the 6-inch pipe had corroded internally and had been embrittled by hydrogen.
  - A gas pipeline ruptured and burned, near Geary, Oklahoma.
- June 9 – A 30-inch Transcontinental Pipeline gas transmission pipeline failed and gas ignited near Bealeton, Virginia from hydrogen stress cracking. Failure alarms at the nearest upstream gas compressor station did not activate, and the pipeline failure was first noticed by a compressor station employee happening to see the large fire from the pipeline rupture.
- July 5 – A 10-inch MAPCO propane pipeline, exposed by recent rains, exploded & burned, near DeWitt, Iowa. There were no injuries.
- July – A Lakehead 34-inch pipeline burst near Bemidji, Minnesota, spilling between 125,000 and 210,000 gallons of crude oil.
- August 13
  - An ammonia pipeline failed near Hutchinson, Kansas after a pump station was started against a closed valve. Three police officers were treated for ammonia inhalation; approximately 200 persons were evacuated from the area of the vapors; trees, lawns, shrubbery, and crops were chemically burned; and an estimated 11,000 fish were killed. It was found that this pipeline had exceeded the maximum operating pressure before failure.
  - An LPG pipeline was cut by an earth mover doing road construction, causing and explosion & fire, near Huffman, Texas. 20 to 30 acres of woodlands were burned, but there were no injuries.
- September 3 – A contractor working to install curbs and gutters in the community of Dale, Wisconsin pulled a gas line apart underneath the town's bank. Gas seeped into the bank's basement and exploded, destroying the bank and the neighboring post office. A bank manager preparing to open the bank for the afternoon was killed, and another resident was seriously injured.
- September 14 – A propane pipeline to an underground storage cavern failed in Griffith, Indiana. The propane later caught fire. 1,000 residents were evacuated during the incident.
- October 8 – A propane pipeline pump station exploded & burned, in Conway, Kansas. The fireball could be seen from a distance of up to about 25–26 miles. There were no injuries.
- November 24 – A 12-inch gas-gathering pipeline exploded and burned near Meta, Kentucky. There were no injuries reported. Acts of vandalism against the pipeline company had happened before.
- December 1 – A crew repairing a leaking crude oil pipeline near Abilene, Texas were overcome by sour crude oil fumes. Six of the repair crew died. The leak was caused by improper welding.

=== 1975 ===
- January 7 – A Mid-Valley Pipeline crude oil pipeline at Lima, Ohio ruptured after a valve was accidentally closed against a pumping pipeline. The spraying crude oil ignited, killing a Terminal Operator.
- January 23 – A propane chiller at a MAPCO facility exploded violently during maintenance work on it, near Iowa City, Iowa. 2 workers were killed and 3 others injured by the failure.
- January 27 – A gas transmission pipeline exploded and gas burned in Mediapolis, Iowa. There were no injuries reported.
- March – A leak was discovered in a 14-inch petroleum products pipeline in Mecklenburg County, North Carolina. Plantation Pipeline began efforts to recover the spilled petroleum. From that time through June 1983, approximately 2,022 barrels of spilled petroleum products were recovered from standpipes at the leak site. Remediation efforts stopped in October 1984. Later tests raised questions on the possibility of not all of the spill products were recovered.
- March 26 – A 12-inch crude oil pipeline ruptured near Harwood, Missouri, on March 26. Heavy rain slowed the cleanup.
- April 16 - A pipeline worker was injured when a 6-inch LPG pipeline exploded, near Port Arthur, Texas. The following fire burned for hours.
- May 12 – A natural gas liquids (NGL) pipeline ruptured due to previous mechanical damage, at Devers, Texas. The escaping vapor cloud drifted across US Highway 90, where a passing automobile ignited the vapor. 4 people were killed in a following vapor cloud fire. The pipeline had been damaged when a valve was installed on the pipeline.
- June – An explosion at a home in East Stroudsburg, Pennsylvania, was caused by natural gas leaking into the home from an open main in the middle of the street. One person was killed. In 1973, workers hired by the gas company had falsified records showing the main had been closed.
- June 11 – A leaking pipeline for the Alyeska Pipeline Service Company was found to have spilled about 60,000 gallons of crude oil at a construction camp in Alaska. That pipeline had been noticed leaking before, but, previous repair efforts had failed.
- June 18 - A 12-inch pipeline under construction burst while being pressurized, near Shidler, Oklahoma. 4 construction workers were injured.
- August 2 – An LPG pipeline ruptured near Romulus, Michigan, due to previous mechanical damage to the pipeline, and over pressurization from operator error, caused by closing a valve against a pumping pipeline, at a storage facility. Nine people were injured in the following vapor cloud fire. Flames 500 feet (150 m) high engulfed a 600-foot (180 m)-diameter area, destroyed four houses and damaged three others, burned 12 vehicles, and consumed 2,389 barrels (379.8 m^{3}) of propane. (August 2, 1975)
- September 3 – An ammonia pipeline ruptured in Texas City, Texas. 47 people needed medical treatment for ammonia exposure.
- September 7 – A gas gathering pipeline failed due to internal and external corrosion near Kilgore, Texas. Unodorized natural gas liquids from the leak were ignited by an automobile, killing 5 people.
- September 19 – Flooding along the Amite River in Louisiana caused a 12-inch propane pipeline to break, releasing about 743,000 gallons of propane.
- October 13 – Employees at a gas processing plant at Goldsmith, Texas heard leak gas, and investigated. Before the leak could be found, a 12-inch pipeline there exploded, killing 3 of the crew, injuring 2 others, and causing extensive plant damage.
- December 15 - 2 workers extracting drip gas from a natural gas pipeline were injured in an explosion, near Amarillo, Texas, with one of the workers later dying.
- December 18 – A failed pressure relief device caused cracks in storage tanks supporting the Trans-Alaskan Pipeline System, leaking about 600,000 gallons of crude oil in Prudhoe Bay, Alaska.

=== 1976 ===
- January 7 – A repair crew working on a natural gas gathering compressor station at Cedardale, Oklahoma, opened the wrong valve in an attempt to increase gas flow. Natural gas & Natural Gas Liquids flowed out of an open 12-inch pipeline, and were ignited by an open flame heater. 5 of the crew were killed, and 2 seriously burned.
- January 10 – A gas leak at the Pathfinder Hotel, in Fremont, Nebraska, exploded, killing 20 people, and, injuring 39 others. A 6 foot by 6 foot section of sidewalk was hurled through the roof of a nearby bakery. A compression coupling, on an Aldyl-A plastic gas line, had pulled apart, causing gas to leak into the hotel's basement.
- February 25 – An LPG/NGL pipeline ruptured near Whitharral, Texas, leading to a vapor cloud fire that killed one, severely burning 4 others who later died, destroyed two homes, and burned an area about 400 yards wide. A Low Frequency Electric Resistance Weld (LF-ERW) seam failure is suspected for the failure. From January 1968 to the date of the Whitharral accident, 14 longitudinal pipe seam failures had occurred on that pipeline system, which resulted in 6 other fatalities, and the loss of over 60,000 barrels (9,500 m^{3}) of LPG.
- February 8 – An improperly assembled compression coupling failed on a gas distribution line in Phoenix, Arizona, causing a house explosion that killed 2 people.
- March 2 – An 18-inch Gulf Oil pipeline failure spilled about 21,000 gallons of crude oil into the Wisner Wildlife Area in Louisiana. There were no initial reports of wildlife being affected.
- March 16 – A 6-inch ARCO pipeline failed near Tilden Township, Pennsylvania, spilling gasoline into a stream.
- March 27 – A two-story building in Phenix City, Alabama, exploded and burned from a gas leak. The explosion and fire killed the six persons in the building. The NTSB found that gas at 20-psig pressure had leaked from a cracked, 3-inch cast iron gas main.
- April 20 – A gas pipeline exploded and burned near Arkadelphia, Arkansas. There were no injuries.
- June 16 – A front loader hit a Standard Oil of California (now Chevron Corporation) 8-inch petroleum products pipeline in Los Angeles, California, during a road widening project along Venice Boulevard. 9 people were killed, a plastic factory was destroyed, and other serious property damage occurred.
- August 8 – A house exploded from gas migrating through the soil, from a broken 4 inch gas main, in Allentown, Pennsylvania. 26 minutes later, gas then exploded in another house, causing a brick wall & part of the street to collapse. 2 firefighters were killed, 14 people injured, and 4 buildings destroyed.
- August 9 – A road grader hit a 20-inch gas transmission pipeline, near Calhoun, Louisiana. Six people were killed in the ensuing fire, 6 families were left homeless, and a mobile home, and 2 houses, were destroyed.
- August 13 – A flash fire in the basement of a house in Bangor, Maine, occurred while a gas company crew was checking for the cause of low gas pressure at the home. The fire killed one gas company employee, burned two other employees, and caused minor damage to the house. One of the crew was using a match to light the basement of the home, and another crew member was smoking when the fire started.
- August 29 – An explosion and fire destroyed a house at Kenosha, Wisconsin. Two persons were killed, four persons were injured, and two adjacent houses were damaged. The destroyed house was not served by natural gas. However, natural gas, which was escaping at 58 psig pressure from a punctured 2-inch plastic main located 39 feet (12 m) away, had entered the house through a 6-inch sewer lateral that had been bored through to install the gas line.
- September 10 – Sewer work and heavy equipment caused soil subsidence on a 6-inch cast iron gas pipe in Blue Island, Illinois, resulting in the pipe breaking in 4 places. Gas then migrated into a building, that later exploded, killing 1 person, and, injuring 10 others.
- November 28 – An 8-inch Sunoco pipeline began leaking in Toledo, Ohio, spilling about 1,000 barrels of gasoline, forcing a major road closure. There were no injuries.
- December 6 – An explosion and fire at a gas pipeline compressor station in Orange Grove, Texas killed one plant worker and injured another.

=== 1977 ===
- January 2 – A gas pipeline ruptured and burned near Nursery, Texas. Some power poles were destroyed, but there were no injuries.
- January 5 – In Fairview, New Jersey, a circumferential break on a 6-inch cast iron gas pipe occurred. The released gas then migrated under frozen soil & a sidewalk, into an area under the floor of a building. The gas later was ignited by an unknown source, causing an explosion that killed 1 person, injured 13 others, and destroyed 3 buildings.
- January 13 – In Baltimore, Maryland, a 4-inch cast iron gas line suffered a circumferential break. The gas migrated under frozen soil and pavement into nearby rowhouses, and was likely ignited by an oil burned motor. One person was killed.
- January 18 – An 18-inch steel gas main failed and leaked into an electrical and telephone conduit in New Bedford, Massachusetts. Three explosions followed, destroying 5 buildings, and breaking windows nearby. Improper pipeline construction techniques were the cause of the failure. There were no injuries.
- February 4 – A gas pipeline exploded and burned in Stockton, California, four days after another gas pipeline fire nearby. There were no injuries.
- February 22 – An explosion occurred on a gas pipeline being repaired, near Munday, Texas. 2 of the crew were killed, and another injured.
- May 20 – Fire broke out at a MAPCO pipeline pumping station and Terminal in Ogden, Iowa, threatening 4 propane storage tanks for a time. There were no injuries.
- June – A Williams Partners pipeline terminal near Lawrence, Kansas spilled about 33,600 gallons of gasoline. The next spring, a rancher nearby was still having gasoline entering a creek on his property.
- July 8 – An explosion at Trans-Alaska Pipeline System Pump Station No. 8 killed one worker, injured 5 others, and destroyed the pump station. Over $2 million in damage was done. A US House of Representatives Committee later announced the cause was workers not following the proper procedures, causing crude oil to flow into a pump under repair at the time.
- July 19 – The Trans-Alaska Pipeline System pipeline was shut down for the 4th time in a month, when it was hit in a valve by a front loader. More than 40,000 US gallons (150,000 L) of crude oil was spilled.
- July 20 – A 12-inch propane pipeline ruptured near Ruff Creek, in Greene County, Pennsylvania, from stress corrosion cracking. The resulting propane vapor cloud ignited, when a truck that was driven into the cloud stalled, then created a spark, when it was restarted. The two men in the truck were killed, as well as 57 head of cattle, along with destruction of power lines and wooded areas. Subsidence of underground coal mines in the area may have hastened the failure.
- July 30 – A cast iron gas main broke in Cherokee, Alabama. Gas migrated into a home through a recently back filled sewer line trench, and exploded 5 days later.
- August – A car drove through leaking liquid from a petroleum pipeline in Lakewood, California. The pooled liquid appeared to be mud, but it exploded and burned, injuring a woman in the car.
- August 9 – Natural gas under 20 psi pressure entered a 6-ounce per square inch gas distribution system in El Paso, Texas, over pressuring 750 gas customers. Numerous small fires resulted from this. The cause was an error during gas pipeline replacement.
- August 15 – Crude oil spilled at Trans-Alaska Pipeline System Pump Station No. 9. There was no fire, but a fire or explosion at that station could have shut down that pipeline, since Pump Station No. 8 was out of service from the previous month's accident there. This was the seventh accident on this pipeline since the start up of the Alaska pipeline on June 20, 1977. The NTSB released three recommendations on September 9, 1977, to correct certain design and operating deficiencies in the pump rooms of each station of the Alyeska system.
- August 26 – A gas transmission pipeline exploded, forcing hundreds to evacuate in Columbus, Indiana. There was no fire or injuries.
- September 5 – 2 brothers in a moving truck drove into a vapor cloud from a leak at a gas compressor plant in New Cuyama, California, igniting the cloud. One was killed immediately, and the other died 11 days later.
- September 10 – A pipeline rupture spilled 69,000 US gallons (260,000 L) of gasoline into a creek in Toledo, Ohio. Corrosion of the pipeline caused the failure.
- A gas line inside a building in San Francisco, California leaked and exploded, injuring 7 and heavily damaging that building. Gas repair crews were working on the line at the time.
- October 12 – A bulldozer ruptured a propane pipeline near Albany, Georgia, causing nearby train traffic to be halted. The bulldozer engine was left running, nearly igniting the vapors.
- October 30 – A bulldozer hit a gas pipeline in Shreveport, Louisiana. The gas ignited, causing a 100 foot tall flame, killing one, and injuring 2 people.
- November 6 – A bulldozer being used by contractors for pipeline work stuck a 10-inch propane pipeline, near Ashland, Kansas. The bulldozer operator was seriously burned, and the bulldozer destroyed.
- November 21 – A backhoe being used to install a pipeline hit an adjacent 6-inch propane pipeline in Hutchinson, Kansas. Fire broke out, but there were no injuries.
- December 1 – Construction workers punctured a 12-inch gas pipeline in Atlanta, Georgia, with an I-beam. No fire or explosion followed, but thousands of people were evacuated from nearby buildings.
- December 10 – A 2-inch plastic gas main cracked and migrated under a paved parking area in Tempe, Arizona. The gas reached a building 35 feet away from the leak, where it was ignited by a cigarette. The explosion and fire that followed killed 2 people, and injured 3 others. Investigations showed the main had been damaged previous, and had been repaired by applying a piece of tape, by a non-gas company person.
- December 15 – A compression coupling joint between a plastic and a steel gas line pulled apart in Lawrence, Kansas. The gas migrated into 2 buildings, and exploded, killing 2 people, and injuring 3 others.

=== 1978 ===
- January 12 – A propane pipeline exploded and burned at a pump station, near Conway, Kansas, forcing a nearby highway to be shutdown.
- January 23 – Earth movement was suspected in causing a gas transmission pipeline to rupture and burn near Stevenson, Washington. There were no injuries.
- January 25 – A 6-inch gas main ruptured at a weld in Stoughton, Massachusetts, causing gas to migrate under pavement & frozen earth into a building. The building later exploded, killing one person.
- February 10 – A front end loader clearing snow hit a 1-inch gas riser line in Sullivan, Indiana. The gas later exploded in the building, killing 4 people, and destroying the building.
- February 15
  - A gas pipeline being tested with compressed air exploded at a seam on the pipe in Cincinnati, Ohio, injuring 8.
  - A portion of the Trans-Alaska Pipeline System pipeline east of Fairbanks, Alaska was ruptured by an explosive device. Crude oil spilled in a 600-foot (180 m) diameter spot.
- February 26 – A 16-inch Cities Service Gas pipeline ruptured near Lecompton, Kansas, causing natural gas shortages in the area.
- March 29 – An improperly plugged gas line leaked into a service vault in Oklahoma City, Oklahoma at a shopping center, overcoming 5 gas company workers. Four of the repairmen died of asphyxiation. None of the repair crew had respirators at the job site.
- April 7 – 2 men were performing maintenance on a town border gas meter in Weimar, Texas when the meter exploded, injuring one of the men. A casting defect in the meter was determined to be the cause of the explosion.
- May 17 – A gas company crew in Mansfield, Ohio accidentally tied a high pressure gas main into a low pressure gas main. Much higher gas flames in gas appliances caused damage in 16 homes, and about 2,000 gas meters were shut off during the incident.
- June 12 – A 10-inch gas pipeline was hit by a construction crew in Kansas City, Missouri. Almost 2 hours later, escaping gas ignited, causing burns to 2 men from a crew trying to fix the pipeline leak.
- August 4 – A MAPCO LPG pipeline in Donnellson, Iowa ruptured from past mechanical damage and improper lowering for road improvements. The vapor cloud ignited several minutes after the rupture. Three people were killed and 2 others severely burned. The pipe failed at a dented and gouged area not seen during the original construction, or lowering for road work a few months before. A hydrostatic test on this pipeline after the accident caused failures at 2 other dented & gouged section, and 15 ERW seam failures in 117 miles. The Office of Pipeline Safety later on fined MAPCO $4,000 for the failure.
- August 7
  - In Lafayette, Louisiana, natural gas at 15 psig pressure escaped from a corrosion leak in an inactive 1-inch steel service line and migrated beneath a concrete slab and into a building where it ignited. The resulting explosion and fire injured six persons and destroyed the building and its contents.
  - An ethylene pipeline leaked and burned, near Welsh, Louisiana. There were no injuries.
- August 14 – A coal digging crew in Cairo, Missouri hit a MAPCO LPG pipeline with a backhoe. The gas ignited about 2 hours later, as digging crews were still working nearby. 1 worker was burned, along with the backhoe, a bulldozer, and a diesel fuel tank.
- August 15 - A natural gas pipeline exploded and burned, near Enderlin, North Dakota. There were no injures.
- August 28 – Natural gas, which had escaped from a circumferential fracture in a socket heat-fusion coupling on a 2-in. polyethylene (PE) main, operating at 40-psig pressure, migrated beneath a one-story house in Grand Island, Nebraska, exploded, and then burned. One person was injured; the house was destroyed; and three adjacent houses were damaged.
- August 30 – About 16,000 gallons of gasoline were spilled in Hampton, Pennsylvania. Workers boring for a sewer line had hit a fuel pipeline. Later, the 2 construction firms responsible were fined only $500 each.
- September 22 – A pipeline feeding a Strategic Petroleum Reserve storage cavern ruptured in Hackberry, Louisiana, causing a large fire.
- October 24 – A 30-inch United Texas Transmission gas pipeline in Brookside Village, Texas ruptured and exploded, killing five people, and injuring 43 others. Seven mobile homes were also destroyed. The blast was felt 35 miles away.
- October 27 - 3 workers tapping into a 6-inch natural gas main to add a service line were burned, when gas escaped & was ignited by a torch, in Channelview, Texas.
- October 30 – A pickup truck with 2 women inside drove into an unseen gas cloud, from a leaking gas gathering pipeline, in Preston, Oklahoma, triggering explosions and a fire, killing the 2 women. 3 homes were also damaged. Flames from the fire reached 200 feet high.
- October 31 - A bulldozer hit & split an oil pipeline, near Corsicana, Texas, causing a large fire. There were no injuries.
- November 7 – An Amoco crude oil pipeline leaked into the Farmington Bay Waterfowl Management Area west of Farmington, Utah. About 105,000 gallons of crude were spilled. The rupture was caused by pumping against a valve that had been closed for earlier pipeline maintenance.

=== 1979 ===
The following incidents occurred in 1979:

- January 6 – A ruptured 2-inch gas line leaking caused a home to explode in Spokane, Washington, killing the homeowner.
- January 16 – An explosion and fire destroyed five commercial buildings and damaged several other buildings in London, Kentucky. Two persons were injured. External corrosion was suspected as the cause. A prearranged pressure increase in the pipeline was also a factor.
- January 18 – In Hocking County, Ohio a high pressure pipeline ruptured, killing a line repairman, and a supervisor. 6 other line repairman were also seriously injured.
- February 7 – A Colonial Pipeline stubline ruptured in Hamilton, Tennessee, spilling about 152,000 gallons of petroleum product. The cause was from improper backfill of soil around the pipeline during its construction.
- March 2 – At Alyeska Pipeline Service Company, Pump Station #6 located near the Yukon River in Alaska, the topping unit producing turbine fuel experienced a flame out of the flare stack which burns flammable tail gas from the unit. Automatic ignition apparatus did not function due to the extreme low temperature of -25F. A safety professional on staff was tasked with climbing the stack and re-igniting the flare manually. Once ignition was established, and before the safety professional could climb down from the top catwalk platform, station management ordered the combustion blower to be turned on and tail gas pressure to be increased from 3psi to 11psi. The action resulted in a surge through the knock out drum at the base of the stack, causing residual oil and naphtha to be blown up the stack, covering the top catwalk and approximately the top 60 feet of the stack in burning petroleum. The safety professional was severely burned and fell through the stack main access ladder components and iron work 115 feet to the ground. The occurrence did not result in a fatality, however, fire damaged the stack and petroleum contaminated the surrounding base area.
- March 4 – A natural gas pipeline exploded and burned, near West Chester, Iowa, ejecting a 40 foot long section of pipe. There were no injuries.
- An 18-inch natural gas transmission pipeline failed underneath the Florida Turnpike in West Palm Beach, Florida, resulting in a 2-hour road closure.
- April 4 – A dredge struck and ruptured a gas transmission pipeline, under Lake Pontchartrain, Louisiana. The gas ignited, seriously burning 3 of the crew of the dredge.
- April 18 – A 24-inch natural gas transmission pipeline pulled out of a compression coupling, during a line-lowering project under Iowa State Highway 181, in a rural area, near Dallas, Iowa. Within seconds, the natural gas ignited and burned a 900-foot (270 m) by 400-foot (120 m) area. Two cars, a pickup truck, and a trailer housing construction equipment were destroyed. A backhoe was damaged and windows were broken in a nearby farmhouse. Five of the eight injured workers were hospitalized. The gas company's accident records indicated that this 24-inch pipeline had experienced 12 previous failures since it was constructed.
- April 20 – A series of explosions, and a fire, struck a Sunoco pipeline terminal in Toledo, Ohio. Some nearby residents fled their homes, and telephone service was disrupted.
- May 11 – 2 explosions and a following fire killed 7 people, injured 19 others, and destroyed 3 buildings in Philadelphia, Pennsylvania. Soil erosion under an 8-inch cast iron gas main caused the main to break and release gas.
- May 13 – A 36-inch Colonial Pipeline ruptured, releasing 336,000 US gallons (1,270,000 L) of fuel oil that damaged vegetation, and killed fish, near Spartanburg, South Carolina. Cracks made in the railroad shipping of the pipe before installation were the cause.
- May 19 – Tank truck drivers waiting at an Amoco terminal heard a bang, then saw a 3-foot side stream of gasoline pour down a nearby hillside in Pittsburgh, Pennsylvania. Train traffic on 2 nearby rail lines had to be stopped during the cleanup.
- June 5 – A "spud" dropped by a pile driving barge in the Gulf of Mexico near Pilottown, Louisiana ruptured a 4-inch natural gas pipeline. The escaping gas ignited, and seriously burned the barge. 4 crew members went missing and were presumed dead.
- June 10 – The pilot of a helicopter reported sighting oil on the surface of the Atigun River near the route of the Trans-Alaska Pipeline System's 48-inch crude oil pipeline. Repair crews found a 7-inch crack which passed through a longitudinal weld. Five days after the first leak, at 3:15 p.m. on June 15, the pilot of an Alyeska helicopter on a routine surveillance flight reported a leak north of pump station No. 12 near the Little Tonsina River. A crack near a wrinkle in the pipe was found there. The June 10 spill resulted in a release of approximately 1,500 barrels (240 m^{3}) of crude oil; the June 15 leak resulted in a release of approximately 300 barrels (48 m^{3}) of crude oil; these losses were estimated by Alyeska personnel at the leak site. The spills were too small to be verified by the Alyeska metering system.
- June 15 – A crack in a wrinkled section of the Trans-Alaska Pipeline System pipeline occurred at Pump Station 12 on the south end of that pipeline in southern Alaska. About 1,000 barrels of crude oil were spilled.
- June 16 – Operator error at Colonial Pipeline caused a prior to installation rail shipping induced crack of a 36-inch pipeline to rupture in Greenville County, South Carolina. 395,000 gallons of fuel oil were spilled, killing vegetation, fish, & wildlife in the area.
- July 3 – A leaking pipeline released gasoline in Granger, Indiana, causing the evacuation of 400 people.
- July 15 – An anchor handling boat, PETE TIDE II, damaged an unmarked gas pipeline with a grappling hook offshore from New Orleans, Louisiana. Two of the crew were missing and presumed dead in the fire that followed.
- July 25 – An explosion and fire destroyed a duplex apartment house in Albuquerque, New Mexico. Two persons were killed, and two persons were hospitalized for burns; adjacent houses were damaged. Earlier in the day, a crew from Mountain Bell Telephone Company (Mountain Bell) had been using a backhoe at the intersection of Bridge Boulevard and Atrisco Road to locate a telephone cable. The backhoe snagged a gas service line but the fact that it was pulled from a 1-inch coupling under the house was not discovered at that time.
- August 20
  - A 34-inch Lakehead (now Enbridge) pipeline ruptured near Bemidji, Minnesota, leaking 10,700 barrels (1,700 m^{3}) of crude oil. The pipeline company initially recovered 60 percent of the spilled oil. Later in 1988, the Minnesota Pollution Control Agency required Lakehead to extract more oil using new technology; removal continued on, with studies still underway in the area.
  - A bulldozer operating near Orange, Texas, was being used to clean a farm drainage ditch. The corner of the blade cut into a propane line, which crossed beneath the ditch. Propane at 350 psig escaped and was ignited within seconds. The resulting fire killed one person, injured another, and caused considerable property damage.
- August 25 – A crude oil pipeline ruptured and spilled oil into a creek new Walnut Grove, Missouri on August 25. 2 miles (3.2 km) of the creek were contaminated, and 32,000 fish killed.
- September 4 – The M/V WHITEFACE struck a high-pressure gas pipeline on Lake Verret, near Pierre Part, Louisiana. A resulting explosion killed a crewman aboard the vessel.
- October 6 – An explosion caused by liquefied natural gas (LNG) vapors destroyed a transformer building at the reception facility of the Columbia LNG Corporation, Cove Point, Maryland. Odorless liquefied natural gas leaked through an inadequately tightened LNG pump seal, vaporized, passed through approximately 210 feet (64 m) of underground electrical conduit and entered the substation building. One person was killed, and one person was seriously injured. Damage to the facility was estimated at $3 million. The fire hydrants and deluge water spray system were inoperable after the explosion because the water main that supplied the system was broken at a flange above ground inside the substation.
- October 24 – An explosion and fire destroyed the county clerk's office building and the adjoining courthouse building, gutted a connecting building which was under construction, and damaged the adjacent houses in Stanardsville, Virginia. Thirteen persons were injured and property was damaged extensively. The following NTSB investigation revealed that natural gas had leaked from a break in a 1 1/4-inch coated steel service line, which had been snagged by a backhoe which was being used to dig a footing for an addition to the county clerk's office building.
- October 30 – A natural gas explosion and fire demolished a townhouse in Washington, D.C., and damaged nearby buildings and cars. No one was inside the townhouse at the time, but three persons in a stopped car were injured when debris from the explosion shattered a car window. After the accident, an inspection of the gas service line that served the townhouse revealed that it had been struck by excavating equipment.
- November 8 – A pipeline contractor's ditching machine hit a 4-inch propane gathering line, in Sterling City, Texas. Propane under 500 psi escaped. Three hours later, a superintendent of the contractor attempted to start his pick up truck, located 650 feet from the leak. The starter of the truck ignited the propane, and the superintendent was severely burned, dying 40 days later. About 64,000 gallons of propane were lost or burned. No maps of the location of the pipeline ruptured were given to the contractor.
- November 11 – A natural gas transmission pipeline exploded in West Monroe, Louisiana, causing 3 subdivisions to be evacuated, and creating a crater 70 feet wide and 20 feet deep. There were no injuries. A gas pipeline explosion had taken place nearby 8 years before.
- December 11 – A 12-inch Amoco pipeline broke near Waverly, Missouri, spilling about 8,400 gallons of crude oil. Temperature changes were blamed for the joint failure on the pipeline.
- December 16 – Military police at Marine Corps Base Quantico discovered fuel oil leaking into the Potomac River, near Chopawamsic Island. A leaking Plantation Pipeline 12 inch pipeline was the source, spilling between 5,000 and 10,000 gallons of fuel oil.
