= 2016 Southeastern United States gasoline shortage =

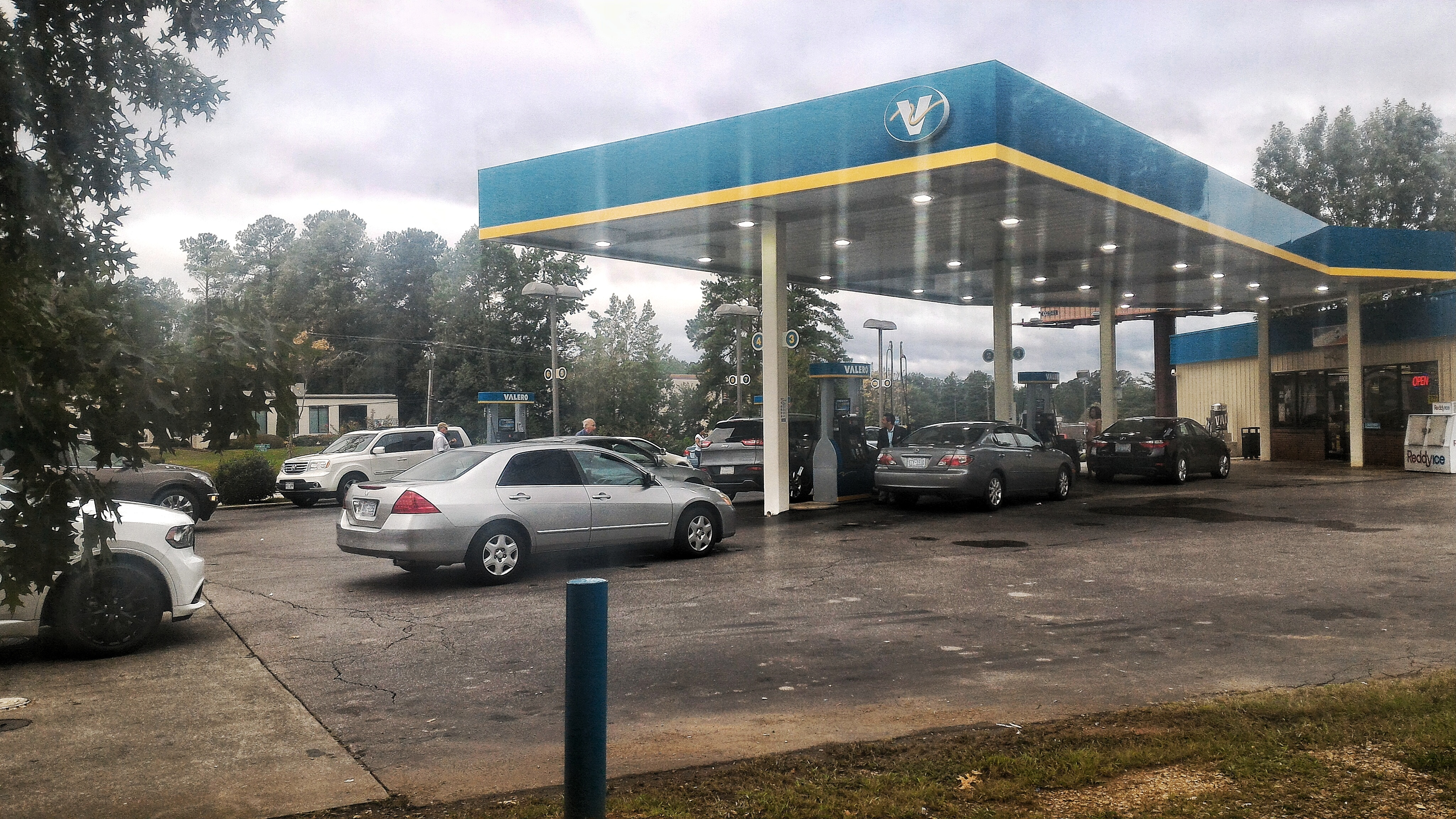
- Vehicles, part of a 20+ line, approach a Valero Fueling Station in Raleigh, NC.
- Date: September 12, 2016; 9 years ago - September 21, 2016; 9 years ago
- Also known as: 2016 Southeast Gas Shortage

The 2016 Southeastern United States gasoline shortage was a phenomenon caused by the 2016 Colonial Pipeline Leak and the resulting panic buying in which many gas stations across six states had entirely run out of gasoline, causing price hikes, halts of services, and several declarations of states of emergency.

On Monday, September 12, 2016, a leak occurred in Shelby County, Alabama, spilling an estimated 350,000 US gallons of summer-grade gasoline, requiring a partial shutdown of the pipeline, and causing gas shortages in much of the Southeastern United States. Six states were affected (Alabama, Georgia, Tennessee, North Carolina, South Carolina, and Virginia), with Alabama, Tennessee, North Carolina and Georgia declaring states of emergency. These declarations eliminated certain size and weight restrictions on vehicles carrying gasoline, and the hours during which they are allowed to deliver.

Many gas stations in the affected regions entirely ran out of gas. Panic buying greatly contributed to this.

== History ==
The Colonial Pipeline leak in Shelby County, Alabama was first detected on September 9. By September 17, the affected regions began experiencing gas shortages due to the leak and panic buying. Colonial announced the construction of a bypass pipeline, which was completed on September 21. Whilst flow was now at optimal rates, Colonial claimed it would be "several days" before processed fuel reached and replenished affected areas.

== Government response ==
On September 13, Georgia governor Nathan Deal declared a state of emergency. On September 15, Alabama governor Robert J. Bentley declared a state of emergency. The pipeline was shut down on September 16, and federal regulators began investigating the cause of the leak. North Carolina governor Pat McCrory, Tennessee governor Bill Haslam and South Carolina governor Nikki Haley all declared states of emergency, allowing fuel tankers to work longer hours to maintain the availability of gasoline.

On September 21, the states of North Carolina and Virginia declared their states of emergency over upon the news of the Colonial Pipeline's completion of the bypass.

== See also ==
- Energy crisis
