= Iroquois Pipeline =

The Iroquois Gas Transmission System (also known as the Iroquois Pipeline) is a natural gas pipeline that brings gas from eastern Canada to the New York metropolitan area – namely, Long Island and New York City.

== Ownership ==
The Iroquois pipeline is owned by TransCanada Corporation, Dominion Resources, KeySpan Corporation, New Jersey Resources Corporation, and Energy East Corporation. Its FERC code is 110.

== See also ==
- Buckeye Pipe Line
- Transcontinental Pipeline
