= List of pipeline accidents in the United States in the 1990s =

The following is a list of pipeline accidents in the United States in the 1990s. It is one of several lists of U.S. pipeline accidents. See also: list of natural gas and oil production accidents in the United States.

== Incidents ==
This is not a complete list of all pipeline accidents. For natural gas alone, the Pipeline and Hazardous Materials Safety Administration (PHMSA), a United States Department of Transportation agency, has collected data on more than 3,200 accidents deemed serious or significant since 1987.

A "significant incident" results in any of the following consequences:

- Fatality or injury requiring in-patient hospitalization.
- $50,000 or more in total costs, measured in 1984 dollars.
- Liquid releases of five or more barrels (42 US gal/barrel).
- Releases resulting in an unintentional fire or explosion.

PHMSA and the National Transportation Safety Board (NTSB) post-incident data and results of investigations into accidents involving pipelines that carry a variety of products, including natural gas, oil, diesel fuel, gasoline, kerosene, jet fuel, carbon dioxide, and other substances. Occasionally pipelines are re-purposed to carry different products.

=== 1990 ===
- January 2 – An ExxonMobil underwater pipeline, located at the mouth of Morse Creek, discharged approximately 567.000 gallons of No. 2 heating oil into the Arthur Kill waterway, between New Jersey, and Staten Island, New York. Later, it was disclosed that the pipeline controlling system had been giving false leak alarms before, and had automatically shut down that day, for a leak being detected, but was restarted twice after that.
- January 13 – A Sunoco pump facility, in Seminole County, Oklahoma, leaked about 14,700 gallons of petroleum products.
- February 13 – An ExxonMobil 18 inch pipeline failed near Crane, Texas, spilling 20,027 barrels of petroleum. The pipe failed from external corrosion.
- March 6 – A bank was destroyed in Crested Butte, Colorado from a leaking propane gas main. 3 employees were killed, and 14 others injured. A ruptured pipe coupling and a pipe separated from a coupling were found on the gas main during the investigation into the explosion.
- March 13 – A TEPPCO Partners propane pipeline ruptured, sending out propane vapors that later caught fire, in North Blenheim, New York. Stress from previous work done on the pipeline caused the pipeline rupture and vapor cloud that moved downhill into a town. Two people were killed, seven persons injured, 8 homes destroyed, and more than $4 million in property damage, and other costs resulted when the cloud ignited.
- March 30 – A Buckeye Partners 10-inch pipeline ruptured from overstress, due to a landslide in Freeport, Pennsylvania, resulting in the release of approximately 1,300 barrels (210 m^{3}) of mixed petroleum products. Spilled petroleum products entered Knapp's Run, a small creek emptying into the Allegheny River and, eventually, the Ohio River. The product release resulted in extensive ground and water pollution and interrupted the use of the Allegheny River as a water supply for several communities, causing severe water shortages in those areas. Damage to the pipeline and environmental cleanup and restoration costs exceeded $12 million. A 6-hour delay in Buckeye contacting the federal National Response Center were also noted.
- April – A pipeline rupture spilled about 294,000 gallons of crude oil into the Sabana River, near Gorman, Texas.
- April 1 – A Mid-Valley crude oil pipeline failed, due to external corrosion, near Leitchfield, Kentucky. About 3,000 gallons of crude oil were spilled.
- April 2 – Six people were treated for injuries from explosions in Danvers, Massachusetts, sparked by gas leaks after a Boston Gas Co. worker accidentally fed high pressurized natural gas into a low-pressure system serving homes. The explosions occurred in houses and condominiums on Beaver Park Avenue and Maple, Lafayette, and Venice streets. Several injuries were reported.
- May 6 – A spool on a Texaco pipeline off of the Louisiana coast ruptured. 13,600 barrels (2,160 m^{3}) of crude oil were estimated to have spilled.
- August 13 – A 10-inch Koch Industries pipeline failed in Linwood, Wisconsin, spilling about 7,980 gallons of gasoline, forcing 12 nearby families to evacuate, and shutting down a nearby railroad.
- August 29 – A private contractor laying conduit for underground power lines ruptured a pipeline that fouled a Western Branch creek with diesel fuel in Chesapeake, Virginia. Over 67,000 US gallons (250,000 L) of fuel were spilled.
- August 29 – A natural gas explosion and fire destroyed two row houses and damaged two adjacent houses and three parked cars in Allentown, Pennsylvania. One person was killed, and nine people, including two firefighters, were injured. A cracked gas main, that was stressed by soil erosion from a nearby broken water line, was the cause of the gas leak.
- November 5 – An Amoco crude oil pipeline ruptured near Ethel, Missouri on a farm, fouling over 35 miles (56 km) of the Chariton River. About 2,400 barrels of crude were spilled.
- November 8 – A Williams LPG pipeline failed in Whiteside County, Illinois, from a drain valve leak, killing 1 person and injuring 1 other.
- November 23 – It was announced that at least 3 leaks that spilled over a thousand gallons of oil were found in a pipeline in Cerritos, California. One of the failed section of pipeline was 6 to 7 years old.
- December 9 – A gas system valve between one of Fort Benjamin Harrison, near Indianapolis, Indiana, gas distribution systems and a discontinued steel gas system segment was inadvertently opened, allowing natural gas to enter residential buildings that had previously received their gas from the discontinued segment. Gas accumulating in Building 1025 of Harrison Village was ignited by one of many available sources, and the resulting explosion killed 2 occupants and injured 24 other persons. One building was destroyed, and two others were damaged.
- December 18 – A bulldozer hit a pipeline supplying jet fuel from a West Texas refinery, to Carswell Air Force Base in Fort Worth, Texas, on December 18, spilling 20,000 gallons of jet fuel. 100 people in nearby apartments were evacuated for a time.

=== 1991 ===
- January 2 – A crew installing a water main hit a 6-inch gas main at 450 psi of pressure in Novi, Michigan. Gas company workers were trying to install a sleeve over the failure when the gas exploded and burned, injuring 6 of the Gas Company crew. A telephone cable was also damaged, knocking out phone service for about 5-- customers.
- January 31 – A Mobil Company crude oil pipeline ruptured near Valencia, California, spilling up to 75,000 gallons of crude oil. The same day, a report was released showing that particular pipeline had a 99.8% chance of a leak in the next 5 years.
- February 5 – A backhoe hit a gas distribution line, next to apartments in Greendale, Wisconsin, causing an explosion & fire that killed 3 and injured 6 others.
- March 2 – Construction crews ruptured a propane pipeline, forcing the evacuation of 2,500 from several subdivisions in Richland County, South Carolina for a time. There was no fire. The break was 5 feet from a pipeline marking sign.
- March 3 – A Lakehead (now Enbridge) crude oil pipeline, near Grand Rapids, Minnesota, ruptured. More than 1,700,000 gallons of crude spilled onto a wetland and the Prairie River, a tributary of the Mississippi River. About 1,672,000 gallons of oil were eventually recovered. About 4 million US gallons (15,000 m^{3}) of oil had spilled from that pipeline from the early 1970s to 1991, per Minnesota records. A resident in the area noticed the smell of oil and alerted the local fire department. Approximately 300 people living in homes near the site were evacuated for safety, but were allowed to return to their homes later in the night.
- March 16 – An anchor from a ship ruptured a Chevron Corporation pipeline offshore of El Segundo, California, spilling about 55,000 gallons of light oil. Wildlife was affected.
- June 8 – A Diamond Shamrock 10 inch crude oil pipeline ruptured in Knox City, Texas, spilling about 84,000 gallons of crude oil, with much of it entering the Brazos River. Heavy rains caused the pipeline to fail.
- June 24 – Excavation work at a Sunoco tank farm facility, in Berks County, Pennsylvania, caused a leak of about 12,900 gallons of petroleum products.
- June 27 – A bulldozer hit a Chevron Corporation crude oil pipeline near Park City, Utah. About 126,000 gallons of crude oil were spilled.
- June 29 – About 54,222 gallons of fuel oil and gasoline leaked from a 10-inch Koch Industries pipeline in Portage County, Wisconsin, from a 3-inch crack. A previous significant leak had occurred on this pipeline in that area the year before. Local officials urged Koch to upgrade its leak monitoring equipment, and, the Office of Pipeline Safety ordered this pipeline to be shut down until tested. Koch later replaced 12 miles (19 km) of that pipeline in the area. The original pipe was installed in 1988.
- June 30 – An Amoco pipeline failed near Denver City, Texas, spilling 28,200 barrels of petroleum. The failure was caused by internal corrosion.
- July 17 – Workers were removing a corroded segment of the Consumers Power Company's (CP) 10-inch transmission line pipeline in Mapleton, Michigan. As a segment of the pipeline was being removed, natural gas at 360-psig pressure exerted about 12 tons of force on an adjacent closed valve (H-143), causing it and a short segment of connected pipe to move and separate from an unanchored compression coupling. The force of the escaping gas killed one worker (a welder), injured five other workers, and collapsed a steel pit that housed valve H-143.
- August 27 – Contractors doing work at a Dixie Pipeline station in Sulphur, Louisiana rupture a 4-inch pipeline carrying propane, which ignited. 3 of the contractors were burned, with 2 of them needing hospitalization.
- August 30 – An earth mover hit a 16-inch ExxonMobil pipeline near Beaumont, Texas, causing a leak that spilled about 19,000 gallons of crude oil. Nearby businesses were evacuated.
- September 5 – About 42,000 US gallons (160,000 L) of crude oil spilled from a broken Amoco pipeline at a barge facility at High Island, Texas on September 5.
- September 7 – A Sunoco pipeline failed from external corrosion, in Lancaster County, Pennsylvania. About 28,000 gallons of petroleum product was spilled.
- December 19 – A 36-inch Colonial Pipeline ruptured from prior excavation damage about 2.8 miles (4.5 km) downstream of the pipeline's Simpsonville, South Carolina, pump station. The rupture allowed more than 500,000 US gallons (1,900,000 L) of diesel fuel to flow into Durbin Creek, causing environmental damage that affected 26 miles (42 km) of waterways, including the Enoree River, which flows through Sumter National Forest. The spill also forced Clinton and Whitmire, South Carolina, to use alternative water supplies.
- December 28 – Two explosions in rapid succession occurred in apartment No. 3 of a two-story, eight-apartment, wood-frame structure in Santa Rosa, California. Two people were killed and three others were injured. Fire after the explosions destroyed that apartment and three other apartments in the front of the building.

=== 1992 ===
- January 3 – An 8-inch Columbia Gas Transmission pipeline in West Finley Township, Pennsylvania failed from earth subsidence, caused by a coal mine. Leaking gas entered a nearby home, causing it to explode. There were no injuries.
- January 5 – A pipeline carrying a mixture of crude oil and water burst in Anchorage, Alaska, spilling 16,900 gallons of crude oil into Cook Inlet.
- January 6 – An ExxonMobil pipeline offshore of Grand Isle, Louisiana in the Gulf of Mexico leaked about 4200 gallons of crude oil.
- January 13 – A spill from a Williams Companies pipeline was discovered in a soybean field, near Renner, South Dakota. The cause of the leak was identified as a hairline crack in the seam. About 400,000 gallons of petroleum products was lost. The leak may have started as long as 6 months before.
- January 17 – While a gas company crew was doing routine annual maintenance work at a regulator station in Chicago, Illinois, high-pressure gas entered a low-pressure gas system. The gas—under as much as 10 psig of pressure—escaped through gas appliances into homes and other buildings, where it was ignited by several unidentified sources. The resulting explosion and fires killed 4 people, injured 4, and damaged 14 houses and 3 commercial buildings.
- March 4 – A gas distribution pipeline failed in Utica, New York, killing 2 people.
- March 4 – Construction equipment ruptured a Sun Co. petroleum products pipeline in Edgemont, Pennsylvania, spilling about 933 barrels of heating oil, that reached Chester Creek.
- March 11 – A crude oil pipeline ruptured in Leitchfield, Kentucky, then the crude oil was ignited, causing a fire at a pump station that forced the evacuation of 69 families. About 3,780 barrels of crude were lost. The cause of the rupture was external corrosion.
- March 15 – Two Tennessee Gas Pipeline lines exploded and burned in White Bluff, Tennessee, destroying 3 homes, and burning 400 acres. 100 people in a 4 square miles area nearby were evacuated, and 2 people treated at a hospital for injuries from the incident.
- April 7 – A Seminole Pipeline Co. salt dome cavern used to store LPG and similar products was overfilled, leading to an uncontrolled release of highly volatile liquids (HVLs) from a salt dome storage cavern near Brenham, Texas, forming a large, heavier-than-air gas cloud that later exploded. Three people died from injuries sustained either from the blast, or in the following fire. An additional 21 people were treated for injuries at area hospitals. Damage from the accident exceeded $9 million. The explosion was heard and felt as far away as Houston.
- April 27 – A 6-inch petroleum products pipeline ruptured, in Lakeland, Florida, spilling about 1,674 gallons of jet fuel. The cause was third party damage.
- May 20 – A contractor planting trees hit a gas pipeline, in Rochester, Michigan, on May 20. The gas later exploded, destroying a 2-story building, killing one person, and injuring 14 others.
- May 27 – Excavation work ruptured a Sunoco pipeline, in Pierson County, Oklahoma, spilling about 7,500 gallons of petroleum product.
- June 19 – An 8-inch ARCO petroleum products pipeline ruptured, due to control problems, spraying a neighborhood in Victoria, Texas with gasoline. Some residents were evacuated as long as 3 days afterwards. There was no fire. About 6700 gallons of gasoline were released.
- September 6 – An Amoco pipeline spilled about 12,000 gallons of petroleum product, in Hammond, Indiana.
- October 9 – A gas transmission pipeline that was being moved on October 9 exploded and burned, near Elwin, Illinois, killing one worker. 2 firefighters were also injured in controlling the situation.
- October 13 – A bulldozer hit a Buckeye Partners pipeline in Moon, Pennsylvania, spilling about 105 barrels of jet turbine fuel.
- October 14 – A heavy equipment operator hit a 10-inch Gulf Coast Natural Gas Company line carrying gas at 420 psi near Wharton, Texas. The escaping gas exploded, then burned, but the operator was unhurt.
- November 6 – A natural gas explosion destroyed a house, in Catskill (town), New York, on November 6. The house had not had active gas service since 1969. The explosion killed a woman in the house, seriously injured her daughter, and slightly injured two children in a neighboring house. Gas had escaped from a nearby cracked gas main.
- December 3 – Pipeline company workers ruptured a natural gas liquid (NGL) pipeline, causing a vapor cloud to drift across I-70 near Aurora, Colorado. The cloud later ignited, burning 6 motorists.
- December 31 – A Sunoco pipeline failed at a weld, in Chester County, Pennsylvania, spilling about 27,000 gallons of petroleum product.

=== 1993 ===
- March 28 – A 36-inch Colonial Pipeline Company petroleum products pipeline ruptured near Herndon, Virginia. The rupture created a geyser which sprayed diesel fuel over 75 feet (23 m) into the air, coating overhead power lines and adjacent trees, and mist covering adjacent Virginia Electric Power Company buildings. The diesel fuel spewed from the rupture into an adjacent storm water management pond and flowed overland and through a network of storm sewer pipes before reaching Sugarland Run Creek, a tributary of the Potomac River. The cause was latent third party damage. About 400,000 gallons of diesel were lost.
- April 6 – A 16-inch crude oil pipeline ruptured, spilling up to 125,000 gallons of crude oil into a stream bed in Kern County, California, forcing a temporary closure of the nearby Golden State Freeway.
- May 21 – A Sunoco pump station, in Creek County, Oklahoma, leaked about 29,000 gallons of petroleum.
- June 3 – A fire at a Transco/Williams Companies gas compressor station, in Billingsley, Alabama injured one worker. The cause was from equipment failure.
- June 9 – A cinder block duplex in Cliffwood Beach, New Jersey, exploded as a New Jersey Natural Gas Company (NJNG) contractor was trenching in front of the building. The gas explosion killed 3 residents of the duplex, and seriously injured 3 others.
- June 24 – A Tennessee Gas Pipeline line failed just next to a gas compressor station in West Monroe, Louisiana, causing a massive fire that forced evacuations of homes & businesses within a mile of the failure. Internal corrosion of the pipeline was the cause.
- July 22 – A city of St. Paul Department of Public Works backhoe hooked and pulled apart a Northern States Power Company (NSP) high-pressure gas service line in St. Paul, Minnesota. An explosion and natural gas-fueled fire resulted about 20 minutes after the backhoe hooked the service line. The explosion force caused part of the building to land on and flatten an automobile traveling southwest on East Third Street, and the driver died instantly. The explosion and ensuing fire also killed an apartment occupant and a person outside the building and injured 12 people.
- July 26 – A 6-inch pipeline in Nebraska was exposed by scour in a creek bed and its banks, and was struck by flood debris, which caused it to rupture. The rupture resulted in the release of 2,203 barrels (350.2 m^{3}) of anhydrous ammonia
- August 1 – A Koch Industries butane pipeline ruptured in Creek County, Oklahoma, forcing about 50 people to evacuate their homes.
- August 14 – A 12-inch gas pipeline failed in Union, New York, causing a fireball that destroyed a nearby home. There were no injuries.
- August 20 – An ammonia pipeline failed in Sperry, Oklahoma. 80 homes in the area were evacuated. Several people were treated for ammonia inhalation injuries.
- September 2 – A trencher being used in golf course construction hit a petroleum productions pipeline in Berwick Township, Pennsylvania, causing a leak of about 26,250 gallons of gasoline. There were no injuries.
- September 15 – An 8-inch NORCO Pipeline Co. line ruptured in east Indiana, just west of Edgerton, Ohio, spilling about 30,000 gallons of diesel fuel. There was a 4 foot long rupture in the pipeline, and some of the diesel entered Fish Creek, killing wildlife. The rupture was caused by pumping against a closed valve. Later, NORCO and ARCO agreed to pay $2.8 million for the spill in US District Court.
- November 3 – Amoco Pipeline was fined $12,500 for a 1971 pipeline leak that contaminated a drinking well and caused other pollution problems for people living near Garfield, Minnesota.
- November 30 – A building in Truckee, California exploded from a failure in a propane distribution system. 1 person was killed, 8 more were injured, and, over $50,000 of damage was done.
- December 2 – A 10-inch Conoco pipeline ruptured, spilling 8,400 US gallons (32,000 L) of gasoline into a creek in Washington, Missouri.
- December 8 – A Sunoco pipeline was detected to be leaking by pressure loss, but, it took several days to find the leak point in Upper Leacock Township, Lancaster County, Pennsylvania. About 2,369 barrels of transmix were spilled. The cause was from a backhoe hitting the pipeline in a cornfield.
- December 20 – An explosion and fire on a gas transmission pipeline near Mellen, Wisconsin, cut off the gas supply to 3,500 customers in the area.
- December 22 – In Ventura County, California, a leak occurred from a crude oil pipeline. This spill released an estimated 92,000 gallons of crude oil. The oil flowed through a culvert, traveled through 150 feet of woodland and brush, to McGrath Creek, then flowed another 1,200 feet into McGrath Lake.

=== 1994 ===
- January – A pipeline ruptured, dumping almost 162,500 US gallons (615,000 L) of oil in the Marais des Cygnes River in Osawatomie, Kansas. In addition to a $804,700 fine, BP Amoco agreed to spend at least $145,300 on a supplemental environmental project involving reconstruction improvements to Osawatomie's water intake.
- January 16 – A pipeline burst during a transfer operation at a tank farm in Saint Louis, Missouri, spilling gasoline. The company knew that some gasoline was missing, but waited until January 18 to confirm and report the loss. About 240,000 US gallons (910,000 L) of gasoline was spilled, with about 100,000 US gallons (380,000 L) entering the Mississippi River.
- January 17 – The Northridge earthquake caused a crude oil pipeline to crack near Piru, California, spilling about 173,000 US gallons (650,000 L) of crude oil into the Santa Clara River. The cleanup took more than 600 workers six weeks to complete and cost more than $14 million.
- February 1 – The third explosion in seven years hit a LPG/NGL pipeline terminal in Iowa City, Iowa. Eleven workers at the terminal escaped injury, and six families within one and a half miles (2.4 km) of the terminal were evacuated. The two previous explosions were in 1987 and 1989.
- March 23 – In Edison, New Jersey, previous damage caused a 36-inch-diameter (0.91 m) natural gas transmission pipeline to rupture. Several apartment buildings and a number of automobiles were destroyed in the massive fire. One woman died of a heart attack, and at least 93 others had minor injuries. Delays in shutting off one of the pipeline's valves was cited as contributing to the damage.
- May 8 – A Sunoco pipeline leaked gasoline in Indiana County, Pennsylvania, forcing the evacuation of 50 homes. About 537 barrels (22,600 US gal; 85,400 L) of gasoline were spilled.
- June 2 – A Koch Industries pipeline spilled gasoline in Wichita, Kansas. About 79,000 US gallons (300,000 L) were spilled, and some of it caused interruptions in local water supply.
- June 9 – A two-inch (5.1 cm) steel gas service line that had been exposed during excavation separated at a compression coupling about 5 feet (1.5 m) from the wall of a retirement home in Allentown, Pennsylvania. The escaping gas flowed underground, passed through openings in the building foundation, migrated to other floors, and exploded. The accident resulted in 1 fatality, 66 injuries, and more than $5 million in property damage.
- July 21 - A 10 inch diameter propane pipeline was hit by an excavator, while installing telephone cables, in Wyandotte, Oklahoma. 4 homes were destroyed, but there were no injuries.
- September 22 – A resident near O'Fallon, Missouri detected a petroleum smell. The local fire department was called several hours later, noticed an oily mist in the area, and found a leaking pipeline. The owner of the 10-inch petroleum products pipeline later claimed the spill volume was less than 1,000 US gallons (3,800 L), but later calculations and batch volume measurements indicate a spill of 29,000 to 37,000 US gallons (140,000 L). EPA officials later admitted that someone lied about the spill volume. Over the next ten years, eight attempts at remediation were made before the O'Day Creek was cleaned of all petroleum products.
- October 8 – A lightning strike shut a valve on a Koch Industries crude oil pipeline crossing Gum Hollow Creek while oil was flowing, triggering a pressure buildup that ripped a 50-square-inch (320 cm^{2}) hole in a section of the pipe that was already weakened by corrosion. Pipeline employees — unaware of the rupture in the pipe — turned the pipeline pumps back on after the pipeline shut down automatically, sending oil pouring into the creek for about an hour. The spill created a 12-mile-long (19 km) slick on Nueces and Corpus Christi Bays along the Texas Gulf Coast. Nearly seven years later, delicate coastal marshes that serve as a nursery for shrimp, flounder, crabs and other marine life had not fully recovered. The estimated spill size was 2,151 barrels (90,300 US gal; 342.0 m^{3}), but that was disputed as being too small. Koch Industries eventually agreed to pay more than $45 million in damages. The company reported to PHMSA that the spill cost zero dollars in property damage.
- October – Record high flooding along the San Jacinto River in Texas led to the failure of eight pipelines crossing the river. Due to the flooding, many other pipelines were also undermined. More than 35,000 barrels (5,600 m^{3}) of petroleum and petroleum products were released into the river. Ignition of the released products resulted in 547 people receiving (mostly minor) burn and inhalation injuries. Spill response costs exceeded $7 million, and estimated property damage losses were about $16 million.
- October 17 – A natural gas explosion and fire destroyed a one-story, wood-frame building in Waterloo, Iowa. The force of the explosion scattered debris over a 200-foot (61 m) radius. Six people inside the building died, and one person sustained serious injuries. Three people working in an adjacent building sustained minor injuries when a wall of the building collapsed inward from the force of the explosion. The explosion also damaged nine parked cars. A person in a vehicle who had just left the adjacent building suffered minor injuries, and two firefighters sustained minor injuries during the emergency response. Two other nearby buildings also sustained structural damage and broken windows.
- November 21 – A Buckeye Partners pipeline ruptured from incorrect operation in Moon Township, Pennsylvania. About 38,000 gallons of kerosene were spilled.
- November 29 – A leak of at least 20,000 US gallons (76,000 L) of diesel fuel was discovered on a Koch Industries pipeline near Plover, Wisconsin. The leak brought this pipeline's total spill volume to 100,000 US gallons (380,000 L) on a 91 miles (146 km) pipeline section through several years.

=== 1995 ===
- Since starting operations in 1954 until 1995, Yellowstone Pipeline had 71 leaks along the Flathead Indian Reservation in Montana, spilling 3,500,000 US gallons (13,000,000 L) of petroleum products. Eventually, the Flathead refused to sign a new lease with Yellowstone.
- March 6 – A 26-inch gas transmission pipeline ruptured and burned near Castle Rock, Washington. There were no injuries.
- March 20 – A natural gas transmission pipeline leaked and burned near Chipola, Louisiana. There were no injuries reported.
- March 27 – A bulldozer operator ruptured a 40-inch gas transmission pipeline in Huntersville, North Carolina, causing an explosion. The operator was knocked off the bulldozer, then was run over by the driverless bulldozer.
- March 30 – A Koch Industries pipeline ruptured in the parking lot of a church in Port Lavaca, Texas, spilling oil and benzine. Businesses nearby were evacuated. About 100 gallons of the mix was spilled. The failure was caused by Koch employees testing the pipeline under pressure, who thought the pipeline was full of only water.
- April 21 – Two Native Tribes of the Flathead Nation shut down the Right of Way agreements of Yellowstone Pipeline in Montana. Past spills on Tribal lands were cited as the reason. In 1999, it was revealed that Yellowstone had 78 leaks in the previous 45 years.
- May 12 – A Sunoco pipeline leaked from excavation damage, in Pontotoc County, Oklahoma. About 14,000 gallons of petroleum product was spilled.
- December 2 – 3 contractors were killed, and another injured, when a vacuum used to control flammable fumes accidentally reversed during welding at a pipeline facility near McCamey, Texas.
- December 9 – A bulldozer hit a 16-inch gas pipeline in North Attleboro, Massachusetts, forcing evacuations of a nearby shopping mall. An estimated 40,000 people were evacuated.
- December 19 – A gas explosion at a twin dwelling in Norristown, Pennsylvania killed 2 people and injured another person. Gas had migrated from a crack in a 6-inch cast iron gas main in the street.

=== 1996 ===
- January 6 – A gas pipeline failure excised a 30-foot (9.1 m) section of pipe. The gas later ignited, causing a vegetation fire in East Stroudsburg, Pennsylvania. Later inspections found numerous flaws on this pipeline.
- January 9
  - Farm equipment pierced a Chevron crude oil pipeline near Coalinga, California, spilling about 210,000 gallons of crude oil over about four acres of land.
  - A Sunoco pipeline leaked from internal corrosion in McClain County, Oklahoma, spilling about 5,900 gallons of petroleum.
- January 12 – A backhoe hit a six-inch Amoco gas pipeline in Andrews, Texas. Consequently, the pipeline exploded, causing severe burns to two workers and minor injuries to two others. One of the workers with severe burns died a few days later.
- February 5 – A pipeline ruptured and spilled diesel fuel into a creek in Fairview Heights, Missouri.
- February 7 – A Columbia Gas Transmission Corp. worker was killed in West Finley, Pennsylvania when the coupling on a pipeline that was being pressure-tested broke loose and hit him.
- February 17 – A Diamond Shamrock propane pipeline was severed by a trenching machine in Parker County, Texas, resulting in the loss of 6,355 barrels of propane. US Highway 377 was shut down while fumes dissipated.
- February 18 – A 20-inch natural gas line near South Point, Ohio failed, causing a massive fire. There were no injuries.
- March 1 – An oil sheen in a canal in Salt Lake City, Utah was eventually traced back to a leaking four-inch Chevron diesel fuel pipeline. The pipeline had been damaged by previous excavation. There were no injuries.
- April 23 – A Colonial Pipeline line failed near Gaffney, South Carolina, spilling gasoline. At first the spill was reported to be only 250 gallons, but later reports indicated that 1,386 gallons were spilled. Rock abrasion was cited as the cause for the failure.
- May 8 – A 20-inch Columbia Gas pipeline was ruptured by a crew installing a water pipeline in Oregon, Ohio. One business nearby was evacuated.
- May 23 – A Marathon Petroleum 20-inch pipeline ruptured at a location near Gramercy, Louisiana. The ruptured pipeline ultimately released about 475,000 US gallons (1,800,000 L) of gasoline into a common pipeline right-of-way and marshland. Gasoline also entered the Blind River, causing environmental damage and killing fish, wildlife, and vegetation in the area. The pipeline controller did not immediately recognize that the pipeline had failed, and continued to ignore alarms from the pipeline SCADA system.
- May 23 – The largest penalty in an environmental case since the 1989 Exxon Valdez oil spill was announced. The Connecticut-based Iroquois Pipeline Operating Company was ordered to pay $22 million in criminal and civil fines for violating federal environmental and safety laws. The violations stemmed from the construction of one of the country's longest natural gas pipelines, running 370 miles from Canada through upstate New York and Connecticut to Long Island. Backfill of the pipeline was one of the issues cited. Four individuals also received jail time.
- June 17 – An Olympic Pipeline products line near Everett, Washington sprung a leak from a buckled area of pipe. About 1,000 gallons of gasoline were spilled into North Ebey Slough. The spill was discovered by a crew installing a water line nearby.
- June 26 – A 36-inch Colonial Pipeline ruptured at the Reedy River, near Fork Shoals, South Carolina. The ruptured pipeline released about 957,600 US gallons (3,625,000 L) of fuel oil into the Reedy River and surrounding areas. The spill polluted a 34-mile (55 km) stretch of the Reedy River, causing significant environmental damage. Floating oil extended about 23 miles (37 km) down the river. Approximately 35,000 fish were killed, along with other aquatic organisms and wildlife. The estimated cost to Colonial Pipeline for cleanup and settlement with the State of South Carolina was $20.5 million. No one was injured in the accident. The pipeline was operating at reduced pressure due to known corrosion issues, but pipeline operator confusion led to an accidental return to normal pressure in that pipeline section, causing the rupture.
- August 4 – 420,000 US gallons (1,600,000 L) of unspecified petroleum product spilled from a Lakehead pipe near Donaldson, Minnesota.
- August 24 – A Koch butane pipeline ruptured, causing an explosion and fire near Kemp, Texas. Two teenagers were killed after driving into the unseen butane cloud while going to report the pipeline leak. A mobile home was also destroyed by the fire. The leak was caused by external corrosion. The pipeline was only 15 years old at the time.
- September 26 – A bulldozer operator in Grand Haven, Michigan hit and ruptured a Wolverine pipeline. Petroleum ignited, burning the bulldozer operator. About 4,300 gallons of petroleum product was lost.
- October – The Yellowstone Pipeline was found to be leaking in Spokane County, Washington. An unknown amount of petroleum product contaminated soil in the area, requiring soil remediation.
- October 17 – A leaking Amoco pipeline caused traffic to be shut down on an industrial area street in Hammond, Indiana, starting on October 17. About 1,250 barrels of gasoline were spilled. The leak was caused by external corrosion of the pipeline, which was installed in 1928.
- October 21 – A workman using digging equipment near Runnelstown, Mississippi ruptured a propane pipeline, causing a leak that led to an explosion and fire that destroyed 4 homes, and forced 22 families to evacuate their homes.
- October 23 – In Tiger Pass, Louisiana, the crew of a Bean Horizon Corporation dredge dropped astern spud into the bottom of the channel in preparation for dredging operations. The spud struck and ruptured a 12-inch submerged natural gas steel pipeline. The pressurized natural gas released from the pipeline enveloped the stern of the dredge and an accompanying tug, then ignited, destroying the dredge and the tug. No fatalities resulted from the accident.
- November 5 – A Colonial Pipeline stub line in Murfreesboro, Tennessee ruptured, shortly after undergoing maintenance. The accident was caused by a valve being left closed after maintenance, which caused pressure to build up when the pipeline was restarted, rupturing the pipeline.
- November 21 – An explosion occurred in a shoe store and office building in Rio Piedras, Puerto Rico. Thirty-three people were killed, and at least 69 were injured. Crews from the local gas provider, Enron, had not found any gas leaks previously, despite complaints of propane odor in the buildings. The failed pipe was made of Aldyl-A plastic.
- December 11 – A natural gas line operated by Williams ruptured just north of Tonganoxie, Kansas. Corrosion around a fitting called a "T-Drip" failed, allowing gas to escape.
- December 26 – A bulldozer ruptured a 10-inch LPG pipeline near Maringouin, Louisiana, forcing the evacuation of nearby residents. There was no explosion or fire.
- December 30 - A Sunoco pipeline ruptured in Vestal, New York, spilling gasoline and diesel fuel. A number of nearby residents were evacuated.

=== 1997 ===
- February 6 – A seal on a pump at a pump station, on a MAPCO natural gasoline pipeline, near Moville, Iowa failed, allowing the product to leak, causing a fire. About 200 US gallons (760 L) of natural gasoline was burned. This forced all residents within a mile of station to evacuate for a time.
- February 8 – A 26-inch gas transmission pipeline failed near Everson, Washington, releasing an explosion which was visible for 40 miles.
- February 9 – A gas transmission pipeline failed near Kalama, Washington, causing a massive fire. It was the second failure of a Northwestern Pipeline Corp. gas transmission pipeline in 2 days in the state of Washington. A few people were evacuated for a time.
- March 1 – An 8-inch SFPP (now Kinder Morgan) petroleum products pipeline was discovered to be leaking near Truckee, California. Some of the spilled product reached Summit Creek. While there were efforts to keep the leaked product from reaching Donner Lake, the spill size of this leak was listed as zero in the report given to PHMSA.
- April 15 - A 6 inch propane pipeline was hit by a bulldozer, in Wiota, Wisconsin, causing an explosion and fire. There were no injuries, and, about 420,000 gallons of propane were burned.
- May 9 – A leak was detected on a 12-inch pipeline near Mount Morris, Illinois. Between 125,000 and 130,000 US gallons (490,000 L) of gasoline were spilled, leading to over a month of cleanup to remove gasoline from the surrounding area.
- May 12 – A Koch Industries crude oil pipeline was spotted leaking by a pipeline patrol aircraft near Bayside, Texas. About 75,600 US gallons (286,000 L) of crude were spilled, affecting marshlands.
- May 30 – A Colonial Pipeline spilled approximately 18,900 US gallons (72,000 L) of gasoline, some of which entered an unnamed creek and its adjoining shoreline in the Bear Creek watershed near Athens, Georgia. During the spill, a vapour cloud of gasoline formed. This spill resulted from a calculation error related to a regular procedure. No one checked the calculations, nor did Colonial have a procedure in place to check such calculations. Several employees were required to flee due to the vapour cloud.
- June 20–26 – Two different sections of a Conoco pipeline were ruptured by earth movement just a few days apart. On June 20, the pipeline ruptured near Lodge Grass, Montana, on the Crow Indian reservation, spilling 1,612 barrels of gasoline. On June 26, the pipeline again failed from earth movement near Banner, Wyoming, spilling 704 barrels of gasoline. The Lodge Grass section of pipeline resulted in 3,400 feet of new pipeline being buried 6 feet deep to avoid soft soil, deeper than the required 3 feet of soil coverage.
- July 21 – A gas pipeline was ruptured, causing an explosion and fire in Indianapolis, Indiana. A 20-inch steel natural gas transmission pipeline was ruptured by a contractor for the gas company, and released natural gas near an intersection adjoining the Charter Pointe subdivision. A nearby directional drilling operation had hit and weakened the pipeline before the failure. One local resident was killed and one was injured in the explosion. Approximately 75 residents required temporary shelter. Six homes were destroyed, and about 65 others sustained damage significant enough to be documented by the local investigation team.
- August 11 – A Chevron Corporation LPG pipeline leaked in Dayton, Texas, causing the loss of 5,041 barrels of LPG. There were no injuries, and the failure caused was listed as "Miscellaneous". 3,500 inmates were evacuated from nearby correctional facilities.
- August–September 10 – In August, residents in Vacaville, California noticed petroleum fumes, but a leaking pipeline was not found until September. The spill was caused by a hairline crack from the pipe's manufacturing, and 20,000 to 60,000 US gallons (230,000 L) of petroleum products had leaked by the time the source was found.
- September 9 – Construction equipment ruptured a Plantation Pipeline line in Fairfax, Virginia, releasing over 2,000 US gallons (7,600 L) of petroleum products.
- December – Over a period of years, more than 420,000 US gallons (1,600,000 L) of gasoline spilled from small leaks in Colonial Pipeline near Darling Creek in St. Helena Parish, Louisiana, before Colonial finally discovered the leak in December 1997. As of September 1999, a plume of gasoline, including leaded gasoline, extended over approximately 14 acres (57,000 m^{2}) on the groundwater surface, more than 60 acres (240,000 m^{2}) of groundwater had been contaminated, and some of the gasoline had entered Darling Creek.
- December 12 – A Mid-Valley pipeline leaked at a pump station in Cygnet, Ohio, spilling about 4,200 US gallons (16,000 L) of crude oil.
- December 13 – A Plains All American Pipeline pipe ruptured from external corrosion in rural San Bernardino County, California, spilling about 541,000 US gallons (2,050,000 L) of crude oil. About 322,000 US gallons (1,220,000 L) of crude were lost.

=== 1998 ===
- January 22 – At least 41,000 gallons of light crude oil was spilled into the Gulf of Mexico 50 miles (80 km) south of Galveston, Texas by a leaking Amoco pipeline. The pipe had been damaged by third party activity.
- February 14 – A landslide during a serious storm ruptured a Shell Oil Company pipeline in Ventura County, California, spilling about 10,000 gallons of crude oil.
- March 4 – A backhoe hit a natural gas pipeline in Attleboro, Massachusetts. The gas later exploded and burned, killing 2 people, injuring 6 others, and causing extensive property damage.
- March 30 – A rupture in a Colonial Pipeline line in a landfill at Sandy Springs, Georgia, discovered on March 30, resulted in the release of more than 30,000 US gallons (110,000 L) of gasoline. When the pipe was excavated, it was found to be buckled and cracked. The NTSB found that the pipeline ruptured because of settlement of soil and trash underneath the pipeline.
- April 4 – A tow of the M/V Anne Holly, comprising 12 loaded and 2 empty barges, which was traveling northbound on the Mississippi River through the St. Louis Harbor, struck the Missouri-side pier of the center span of the Eads Bridge. Three of these barges drifted toward the President Casino on the Admiral, a permanently moored vessel below the bridge on the Missouri side of the river. A natural gas leak resulted when the natural gas supply line to the Admiral was severed in the course of the accident. When the line broke, natural gas began escaping. Although the escaping gas did not ignite, the gas leak had continued for about 3 hours before being stopped.
- July 7 – In South Riding, Virginia, a natural gas explosion and fire destroyed a newly constructed residence in the South Riding community in Loudoun County, Virginia. A family consisting of a husband and wife and their two children were spending their first night in their new home at the time of the explosion. As a result of the accident, the wife was killed, the husband was seriously injured, and the two children received minor injuries. Five other homes and two vehicles were damaged. The cause of the gas leak was inadequate separation between the electrical service line and the gas service line which was damaged during installation of the electrical line, allowing release of natural gas into the basement.
- July 14 – A bulldozer operator hit an 8-inch LP gas pipeline in Placedo, Texas. The gas caught fire and the operator was burned to death. 100 acres of nearby brush were burned from the fire. 2 charred pipeline warning signs were within 10 yards of the incident. It was found that the pipeline, built in 1938, was only inches below the surface.
- August 13 – Lightning struck a Florida Gas Transmission Co. natural gas compressor plant near Perry, Florida, causing an explosion and massive fire. A second explosion later followed, injuring 5 firefighters & pipeline company employees. 6 nearby homes were also destroyed.
- September 22 – An 8,810 barrels (1,401 m^{3}) crude oil spill from a Lakehead (now Enbridge) pipeline near Plummer, Minnesota was caused by an excavator hitting that pipeline.
- October 1 – A break in a BP pipeline near the Mississippi Canyon in the Gulf of Mexico, off the Louisiana coast, spilled about 155,000 gallons of crude oil.
- October – A tank sprung a leak at a Koch Industries Pipeline crude oil receiving station. More than 30,300 gallons spilled out, much of it flowing into the creek, a tributary of the San Antonio River, in Karnes County, Texas.
- December 3 – Crews installing a new pipeline hit a natural gas liquids (NGL) pipeline near Moab, Utah, with escaping product igniting near Highway U-191, injuring 4 pipeline workers. Asphalt in the road was melted, and traffic was stopped.
- December 8 – A gas transmission pipeline exploded and burned, forcing a dozen families within a 2-mile radius of the fire to evacuate, near Essex Township, Illinois. The fire was 15 stories tall. There were no injuries.
- December 11 – 1998 St. Cloud explosion: While attempting to install a utility pole support anchor in a city sidewalk in St. Cloud, Minnesota, a communications network installation crew struck and ruptured an underground, 1-inch, high-pressure plastic gas service pipeline, thereby precipitating a natural gas leak. About 39 minutes later, while utility workers and emergency response personnel were taking preliminary precautions and assessing the situation, an explosion occurred. As a result of the explosion, 4 persons were fatally injured; 1 person was seriously injured; and 10 persons, including 2 firefighters and 1 police officer, received minor injuries. Six buildings were destroyed. Damage assessments estimated property losses at $399,000.

=== 1999 ===
- January 2 – A natural gas transmission pipeline exploded and burned at a pipeline facility near Pendleton, Oregon. Flames reached 500 feet high, and several towns lost gas service for a time.
- January 3 – A natural gas explosion and a fire occurred at a gas pressure station in Wytheville, Virginia, destroying a home and a motorcycle store.
- January 8 – A leak in a 12-inch pipe at a Koch Industries tank farm in Benavides County, Texas spilled about 10,500 barrels of crude oil. The cause was internal corrosion of the pipe.
- January 22 – In Bridgeport, Alabama, on January 22, while digging a trench behind a building, a backhoe operator damaged a 3/4-inch steel natural gas service line and a 1-inch water service line. This resulted in two leaks in the natural gas service line, which was operated at 35 psig. One leak occurred where the backhoe bucket had contacted and pulled the natural gas service line. The other was a physical separation of the gas service line at an underground joint near the meter, which was close to the building. Gas migrated into a building nearby, where it ignited. An explosion followed, destroying three buildings. Other buildings within a two-block area of the explosion sustained significant damage. Three fatalities, five serious injuries, and one minor injury resulted from this accident.
- January 23 – A construction crew ruptured a 10-inch diameter petroleum products pipe near Germantown, Wisconsin, spilling about 41,000 gallons of gasoline.
- February 9 – A pipeline ruptured in Knoxville, Tennessee, and released over 53,000 US gallons (200,000 L) of diesel fuel into the Tennessee River. A brittle-like crack was found on the pipe in an area of coating failure. The NTSB expressed concern that the material's toughness had a role in this rupture. Two days before the rupture, an in-line inspection device was run through the pipe segment, with no anomalies in the rupture area reported. Contributing to the severity of the accident was Colonial Pipeline Company's failure to determine from the SCADA system that a leak had occurred, with the result that the pipeline controller started and restarted the pipeline, increasing the amount of diesel fuel that was released.
- May 1 – Excavation equipment damaged a Koch Industries pipeline in Pleasant Hill, Iowa, spilling 3,663 barrels of crude oil.
- June 10 – Olympic pipeline explosion: A pipeline in a Bellingham, Washington park ruptured and leaked gasoline, and later vapor from the leak exploded and burned, killing two 10-year-old boys and an 18-year-old man. Issues causing the rupture were found to be previous pipe damage by excavation, an incorrectly set up pressure relief valve, unexpected repeated remote valve closures, and new software tests on the live controlling computer.
- June 24 – About 100 barrels of gasoline spilled in a Buckeye Partners Terminal in Breinigsville, Pennsylvania.
- August 4 – A Sunoco pipeline leaked from internal corrosion, in Payne County, Oklahoma. About 15,100 gallons of petroleum products were spilled.
- August 10 – An auger being used to install utility poles hit a 14-inch ethane-propane pipeline, causing an explosion & fire that killed the auger operator, and forcing evacuations near Liberty Hill, Texas.
- August 29 – A pump on Olympic Pipeline failed, in Renton, Washington, spilling about 3,360 gallons of gasoline and aviation fuel. About 950 tons of soil were removed due to contamination.
- November 1 – A Lakehead Pipeline (now Enbridge) was damaged by outside force near Crystal Falls, Michigan. 400 people were evacuated from the area. Fire was used to burn some of the released substances, so, of about 223,000 gallons of NGL's and crude oil spilled, only about 115,000 gallons were recovered, with over 2,100 yards of contaminated soil removed in just the first 2 weeks of cleaning. The pipe broke where it was on a rock in the pipeline trench.
- November 12 – A natural-gas pipeline ruptured, killing one man, and injuring another. A spokeswoman for Northern Natural Gas said the 10-inch-diameter pipe was punctured by a digging crew in a field near Oelwein, Iowa, about 125 miles northeast of Des Moines. It ruptured 2 & 1/2 hours later, as gas company workers checked out the leak. Fire officials said the gas didn't ignite, though residents within a mile of the site were evacuated.
- November 19 – 2 men were injured in Salt Flat, Texas, when a leaking 8-inch propane pipeline exploded. 2 school buses had passed through the area moments before the explosion. About 6,195 barrels of propane were leaked. The pipeline failed from external corrosion.
