= Lists of pipelines =

Numerous pipeline transport projects have been developed or are under development including:

- List of countries by total length of pipelines
- List of main natural gas pipelines in Lithuania
- List of natural gas pipelines
- List of natural gas pipelines in Western Australia
- List of oil pipelines

== Pipeline accidents ==
- List of pipeline accidents
- List of pipeline accidents in the United States before 1900
- List of pipeline accidents in the United States (1900–1949)
- List of pipeline accidents in the United States (1950–1969)
- List of pipeline accidents in the United States in the 1970s
- List of pipeline accidents in the United States in the 1980s
- List of pipeline accidents in the United States in the 1990s
- List of pipeline accidents in the United States in the 2000s
- List of pipeline accidents in the United States in the 2010s
- List of pipeline accidents in the United States in the 2020s
