= 2016 Colonial Pipeline leak =

Mass gas leak

On Monday, September 12, 2016, a leak in the Colonial Pipeline in Shelby County, Alabama, spilled an estimated 350,000 US gallons of summer-grade gasoline, requiring a partial shutdown of the pipeline, and causing gas shortages in much of the Southeastern United States. Six states are affected (Alabama, Georgia, Tennessee, North Carolina, South Carolina, and Virginia), with Alabama, Tennessee, Georgia and Virginia declaring states of emergency. The same line suffered an explosion in late October at a site only miles distant.

== See also ==
- 2016 Southeastern United States gasoline shortage
- 2020 Colonial Pipeline oil spill
