= Transcontinental Pipeline =

Natural gas pipeline in the US

Transcontinental Gas Pipe Line Transco

Location
- Country: United States
- Start: Corpus Christi, Texas
- To: Island Park Energy Center, Barnum Island, New York

General information
- Type: Natural gas
- Owner: Williams Companies
- Commissioned: 1950

Technical information
- Length: 10,500 mi (16,900 km)
- Maximum discharge: 3.5 trillion cubic feet (99×10^{9} m^{3}) per annum
- Diameter: 42 in (1,067 mm)
- No. of compressor stations: 59
- Website: www.williams.com/pipeline/transco/

Transcontinental Gas Pipe Line (Transco) is a natural gas pipeline which brings gas from the Gulf coast of Texas, Louisiana, Mississippi, and Alabama, to New Jersey and much of the New York metropolitan area – namely, New York City and Long Island – by way of Georgia, South Carolina, North Carolina, Virginia, Maryland, and Pennsylvania. It is owned by the Williams Companies. Its FERC code is 29.

== Environmental agreements ==
In an agreement with the EPA and U.S. Department of Justice, the Transcontinental Gas Pipe Line Corporation tests soil and groundwater contamination near its compressor stations. This agreement also included a cleanup program for polychlorinated biphenyl (PCB).

== See also ==
- List of natural gas pipelines
- Buckeye Pipe Line
- Iroquois Pipeline
