= Perth Amboy Refinery =

Oil refinery in New Jersey, United States

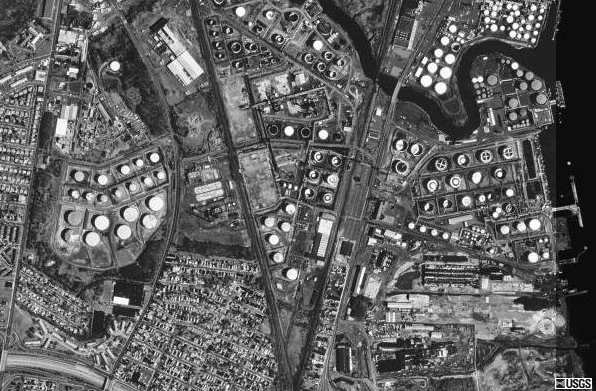
- Perth Amboy Refinery photographed by USGS, April 1995

- Location of the Perth Amboy Refinery Perth Amboy Refinery (New Jersey) Perth Amboy Refinery (the United States)
- Location: Perth Amboy, New Jersey, United States; 40.535°N 74.266°W

Refinery details
- Owner: Buckeye Partners
- Opened: 1920
- Capacity: 80,000 barrels per day (13,000 m^{3}/d)

The Perth Amboy Refinery is a refinery built in 1920. It is between Convery Boulevard and State Street in Perth Amboy, New Jersey, adjacent to the Outerbridge Crossing. Via rail it is served by Conrail's Chemical Coast and the former Perth Amboy and Woodbridge lines. Oil tankers and lighter can reach the refinery along the Arthur Kill.

== History ==
The refinery opened in 1920, by the Barber Asphalt Company. Chevron Corporation acquired the Perth Amboy Refinery in 1945.

In 1983 the refinery stopped production of gasoline and heating oil and concentrated on asphalt refining.

A spill occurred in 2006 that resulted in approximately 31,000 gallons of oil released. Approximately 119,448 gallons of oil-water mixture were recovered and stored. Approximately 477,234 pounds of oil absorbents and other contaminated solids were removed during the cleanup. At the end of 2008 the refinery had an asphalt refining capacity of 80,000 barrels (13,000,000 L).

In 2012 the refinery was sold to Buckeye Partners for $260 million. Buckeye planned to again produce multiple petroleum products at the site.
