= Colonial Pipeline =

Pipeline network in the United States

Colonial Pipeline Company logo

Colonial Pipeline Company is a pipeline operating company headquartered in Alpharetta, Georgia. The company was founded in 1961 and started construction of the Colonial Pipeline in 1962, the largest pipeline system for refined oil products in the U.S. The pipeline – consisting of three tubes – is 5,500 miles (8,850 km) long and can carry 3 million barrels of fuel per day between Texas and New York.

In May 2021, the pipeline was the subject of a ransomware cyberattack that caused a shutdown of their operations for five days, which resulted in a temporary fuel shortage along the East Coast.

== Background ==
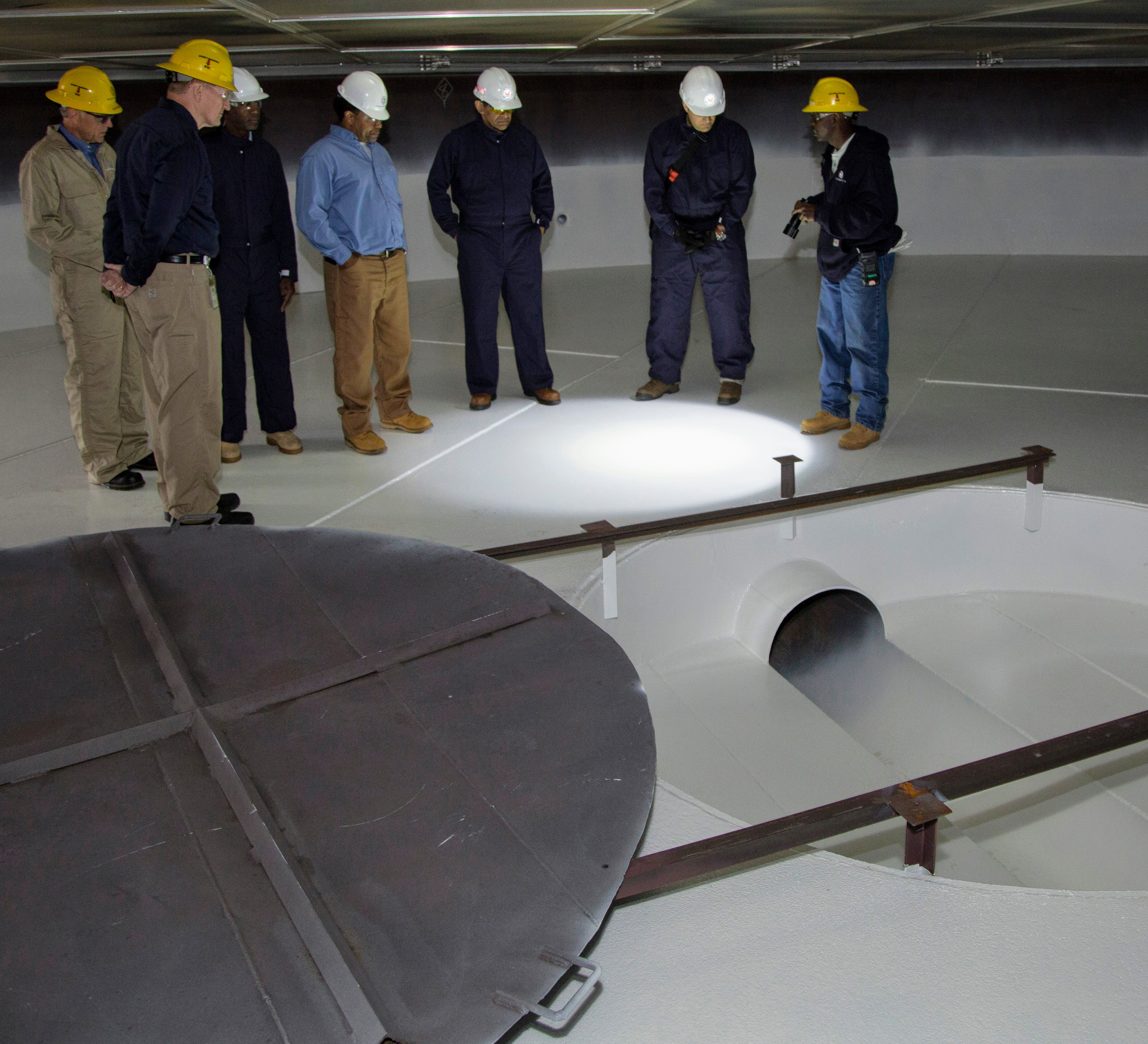
The chairman of the National Transportation Safety Board inspects the inside of a junction tank at Colonial Pipeline's Dorsey Junction Transmix Facility in Woodbine, Maryland, in 2014.

Colonial consists of more than 5,500 mi (8,850 km) of pipeline, originating in Houston, Texas, on the coast of the Gulf of Mexico and terminating at the Port of New York and New Jersey. The pipeline travels through the coastal states of Texas, Louisiana, Mississippi, Alabama, Georgia, South Carolina, North Carolina, Virginia, Maryland, Delaware, Pennsylvania, and New Jersey. Branches from the main pipeline also reach Tennessee. It delivers a daily average of 1×10^{8} US gallons (3.8×10^{8} L) of gasoline, home heating oil, aviation fuel and other refined petroleum products to communities and businesses throughout the South and Eastern United States.

The main lines are 40 inches (1,000 mm) and 36 inches (910 mm) in (inner) diameter, with one devoted primarily to gasoline and the other carrying distillate products such as jet fuel, diesel fuel, and home heating oil. The pipeline connects directly to major airports along the system. Fifteen associated oil terminals store more than 1.2×10^{9} US gallons (4.5×10^{9} L) of fuel and provide a 45-day supply for local communities.

Products move through the main lines at a rate of about 3 to 5 miles per hour (4.8 to 8.0 km/h). It generally takes from 14 to 24 days for a batch to get from Houston, Texas to New York Harbor, with 18.5 days the average time.

=== Ownership ===
Colonial Pipeline's owners are:

- Koch Industries (a.k.a. Koch Capital Investments Company LLC, 28.09% stake ownership)
- South Korea's National Pension Service and Kohlberg Kravis Roberts (a.k.a. Keats Pipeline Investors LP, 23.44% stake ownership)
- Caisse de dépôt et placement du Québec (16.55% stake ownership via CDPQ Colonial Partners LP, acquired in 2011)
- Royal Dutch Shell (a.k.a. Shell Pipeline Company LP, 16.12% stake ownership)
- IFM Investors (a.k.a. IFM (US) Colonial Pipeline 2 LLC, 15.80% stake ownership, acquired in 2007)

== History and timeline ==
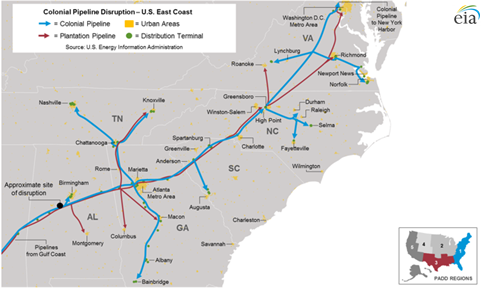
Colonial Pipeline, U.S. East Coast

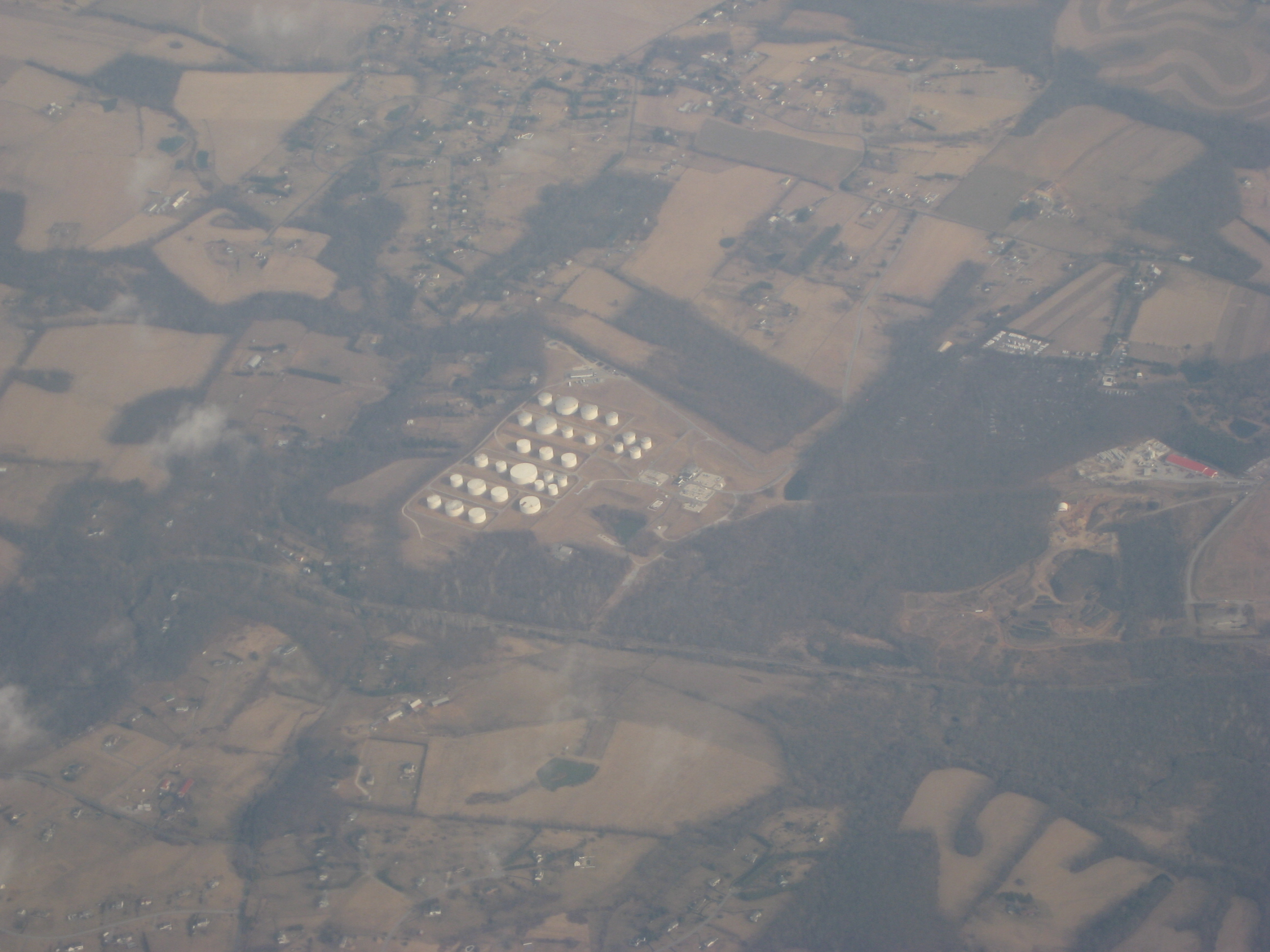
Colonial Pipeline Dorsey Junction Terminal near Woodbine, Maryland

Eight major oil companies began discussing a Gulf Coast–to–East Coast pipeline in 1956. On June 7, 1961, Sinclair Pipeline Co., Texaco Inc., Gulf Oil Co., American Oil Co., The Pure Oil Co., Phillips Petroleum Co., The Cities Service Co. and Continental Oil Co. filed incorporation papers in Delaware to establish the Suwannee Pipe Line Company "for the purpose of building a 22-inch line from Houston to the Baltimore–Washington area, capable of delivering 300,000 barrels of refined products a day." Construction of Colonial Pipeline's original system started in 1961.

1962

During February 1962, the board of the Suwannee Pipe Line Company met to rename the company. It chose Colonial Pipeline Company to represent the fact that the proposed pipeline would traverse several states that were former colonies. Mobil joined the other eight companies in 1962. On March 6, 1962, Colonial Pipeline Company formally announced its plans. A press release stated that the nine companies "launched the largest single, privately financed construction project in the history of the United States." The initial investment by the nine companies was almost $370 million. R.J. Andress was named president of the newly formed company.

Constructing the Colonial Pipeline required 600,000 tons of steel; and trenching 16.7 million cubic yards of earth to bury the pipeline. It initially included 27 pumping stations to move refined product between Houston and Linden, New Jersey.

A ceremonial ground-breaking near Atlanta, the pipeline's eventual headquarters, on June 20, 1962, was attended by U.S. Commerce Secretary Luther Hodges and company, city and state officials. On July 2, 1962, Colonial Pipeline Company solicited bids from contractors to build 15 segments of the pipeline's mainline. Each segment averaged 100 miles and 200–300 workers. Work progressed at roughly one mile per day for each of the segments. The first lengths of pipe were delivered by rail, barge, and on specially constructed trailers to handle 80-foot double joints on the road. Construction started on August 1, 1962, in Mississippi.

In December 1962, Ben "Tex" Leuty was named president of Colonial Pipeline Company. He had earlier served as vice president and general manager overseeing construction of the pipeline.

1963

Engineers needed to solve many problems to construct the pipeline. Chief among these was designing and constructing valves capable of opening and closing 2-ton steel gates in a timely manner to prevent substantial intermingling of different products. Electric motors required 3 minutes to close the massive gates; this allowed 2,400 barrels of product to intermix, rendering the product unusable. To reduce this intermixing, Colonial engineers designed a hydraulic system which reduced the intermixing (and loss) to 120 barrels as changes were made in products shipped.

The first "linefill" of Colonial began the morning of September 16, 1963, in Houston. It was shut down that day, because of forecasts of a developing major storm. Two days later Hurricane Cindy struck the Gulf Coast. Product reached Greensboro, North Carolina for the first time in November 1963. During the next several months, product was delivered to markets farther north in the Southeast and Mid-Atlantic states.

1964

On April 27, 1964, the first batch of refined product was delivered to the Roanoke, Virginia area. On June 2, 1964, Colonial made its first delivery to the Baltimore, Maryland – Washington, D.C., area. On December 1, 1964, mainline construction of the Colonial Pipeline was completed, and the Linden Junction Tank Farm and Delivery Facility in New Jersey was activated. The Colonial Pipeline system was fully operational on December 18, 1964.

1965

The Colonial system averaged a throughput of 636,553 barrels of refined product a day in 1965, its first full year of operation.

Fred Steingraber was elected president of Colonial Pipeline Company on July 26, 1965, taking control in October.

1966

By February 1966, Colonial was averaging a daily throughput of 776,883 barrels of refined product each day, surpassing the 600,000 barrel per day estimated when construction began just a few years before. During May 1966, Colonial began phase one of an expansion project to add 18 intermediate booster stations to add horsepower to the system. This resulted in increasing product flow through the mainline between Selma, North Carolina and Greensboro, North Carolina. The Colonial pipeline board of directors approved phase 2 and 3 of its early expansion projects to increase capacity on its mainline to 1 million barrels per day.

1967

Phase two of the expansion was completed in November 1967, adding additional pump units and a new stubline from Mitchell, Virginia to Roanoke, Virginia.

1971

"Looping", or adding a second line parallel to the first, began in 1971. This construction continued through 1980, essentially doubling the capacity of the pipeline system. The second line was staffed by 593 employees.

1972

Colonial's average throughput increased to an average of 1,584,000 barrels per day. Colonial's ownership increased to 10 shareholders including Atlantic Richfield Company; BP Oil Company; Cities Service Company; Continental Pipe Line Company; Mobil Pipe Line Company; Phillips Investment Company; Texaco, Inc.; The American Oil Company; The Toronto Pipe Line Company and Union Oil Company.

1975

Colonial Pipeline Company named Tom Chilton as president and CEO.

1977

Colonial Pipeline announced the construction of a 40-inch loop line from Atlanta, Georgia to Greensboro, North Carolina, and a 16-inch lateral loop between Greensboro, North Carolina and Selma, North Carolina. These improvements were estimated to increase system capacity by nearly 20 percent to two million barrels per day.

1978

On November 3, 1978, the new 40-inch line from Atlanta, Georgia to Greensboro, North Carolina began service. Colonial became the first company to equip gasoline storage tanks with geodesic domes. Colonial updated its Atlanta control center with a new generation of its computerized SCADA system.

1980

An expansion project totaling $670 million neared completion. The Colonial Pipeline system capacity was 83 percent more than when the system first opened in 1964.

Transportation Energy Management: Fuel Futures, 1983

1984

Colonial began deliveries to Department of Defense, Defense Fuel Supply Command (DFSC).

1985

Colonial began using caliper and magnetic pigs to detect anomalies in its pipeline system.

1987

Donald Brinkley was named president and CEO of Colonial Pipeline Company. Colonial Pipeline Company celebrated its 25th anniversary, serving 79 shipper companies and 67 suppliers.

1988

Colonial's annual throughput attained 635.6 million barrels. During September 1988, Colonial replaced 7,700 feet of mainline pipe across the Delaware River at a cost of $10 million.

1990

Colonial's annual throughput attained 667.8 million barrels, a record volume for the company.

1991

Colonial Pipeline Company relocated its corporate headquarters in Atlanta from Lenox Towers to Resurgens Plaza.

1992

Colonial's annual throughput attained 676.2 million barrels. Colonial completed 4,000 miles of pipeline inspections with caliper pigs and corrosion inspections on 3,000 miles of pipe with magnetic pigs.

1996

Colonial introduced elastic-wave pigs to inspect and detect microscopic cracks in the pipeline walls.

1997

On March 26, 1997, Colonial Pipeline Company was one of ten companies recognized for quality service by the Department of Defense, Military Traffic Management Command. Colonial president and CEO Donald Brinkley retires, David Lemmon named president and CEO.

1998

Colonial replaced Pipeline Instruction and Proficiency Examination with a computer-based training program for operations and environmental field staff. Colonial expands crack-pig internal inspection program, a key element of system integrity.

1999

As a precautionary measure, on December 31, 1999, Colonial Pipeline shut down operations for a few hours before and after midnight to prevent any Y2K-related power outages.

2000

Colonial announced plans to increase pump power on the mainline, which would increase daily capacity by 144,000 barrels to 2.35 million barrels per day. On July 27, Colonial Pipeline announced that it acquired Alliance Products Pipeline and Terminal System from BP Amoco.

2001

Colonial Pipeline Company was recognized by API for its safety and environmental record, receiving the first "Distinguished Environmental and Safety Award".

During September 2001, Colonial Pipeline Company relocated its headquarters from Atlanta to suburban Alpharetta, Georgia. After the September 11, 2001 terrorist attacks on the United States, Colonial increased security at each of its facilities and created a comprehensive security plan. This was later recognized by the Federal Government as a model for the pipeline industry. Colonial Pipeline marked a record year with an annual throughput of 2.3 million barrels per day.

2008

After the passage of Hurricane Ike in September 2008, the pipeline was operated at a severely reduced capacity due to a lack of supply from refineries in the Gulf Coast that had closed, causing gasoline shortages across the southeastern United States.

2017

Joe Blount is named CEO.

2020

An estimated two million gallons of gasoline leaked into the Oehler Nature Preserve near Huntersville, North Carolina. This was the largest onshore oil spill in American history.

2021

On May 7, 2021, Colonial was the subject of a ransomware cyberattack that resulted in a shutdown of their operations. Approximately 12,000 gas stations were affected directly by the shutdown. Operations were restored on May 13, 2021.

2022

Melanie Little named president and CEO.

== Operations ==
Colonial Pipeline's field operations are divided into three districts:

- The Gulf Coast District includes Texas, Louisiana and Mississippi, and is responsible primarily for the originating deliveries of Colonial. Colonial primarily draws products from refineries along the U.S. Gulf Coast. It also uses a few refineries in the Northeast.
- The Southeast District includes Alabama, Tennessee, Georgia, South Carolina and North Carolina. The company's second-largest tank farm is in suburban Atlanta. Local supplies are delivered from here, and it is the origin of pipelines serving Tennessee and southern Georgia. The company's largest tank farm is in Greensboro, North Carolina, where the two mainlines originating in Houston terminate. Deliveries to the Northeast originate from Greensboro.
- The Northeast District's operations include Virginia, Maryland and New Jersey. Colonial's Northeast operations also serve Delaware and Pennsylvania. In Linden, New Jersey, Colonial operates the Intra-Harbor Transfer system, which provides numerous customers the ability to transfer products among themselves and access barge transportation for exporting product.

Colonial connects directly to several major airports, including Atlanta, Nashville, Charlotte, Greensboro, Raleigh-Durham, Dulles, Baltimore-Washington, and beginning October 2022, Philadelphia International Airport. It serves the New York metropolitan area airports via connections with Buckeye Pipeline.

== Innovations ==
- 1978 – Colonial became the first company to equip gasoline storage tanks with geodesic domes.
- 1985 – Colonial begins use of caliper and magnetic pigs to detect anomalies in the lines.
- 1994 – following a historic flood that ruptured a number of pipelines at the San Jacinto River near Houston, Texas, Colonial directionally drilled 30 feet beneath the river and floodplain to install two new 3,100-foot permanent pipelines.

== Safety and environmental record ==
As a result of seven different spills on Colonial Pipeline in four years in the 1990s, the United States Environmental Protection Agency (EPA) filed a complaint in 2000 against Colonial for violations of the Clean Water Act. It alleged gross negligence specifically in three cases noted above: 1996 Reedy River, 1997 Bear Creek, and 1999 Goose Creek/Tennessee River. The parties reached a settlement with Colonial Pipeline that was announced on April 1, 2003. Colonial was required to pay a civil penalty of $34 million, the "largest a company has paid in EPA history." "Under the consent decree, Colonial will upgrade environmental protection on the pipeline at an estimated cost of at least $30 million."

In this period, Colonial received the American Petroleum Institute (API)'s Distinguished Environmental and Safety award for four consecutive years (1999–2002). Some of these awards were made after EPA had filed a complaint against the company for violations of the Clean Water Act, and prior to the landmark civil penalty assessed in the settlement of the civil case.

In 2005, Hurricane Katrina knocked out power in large parts of Mississippi and Louisiana, forcing Colonial to operate at reduced flow rates. The company rented portable generators to help restore partial service as utilities recovered and restored normal service. When Hurricane Rita hit a month later, Colonial used these generators to help load product stranded in refinery storage tanks that did not have power. By the time hurricanes Gustav and Ike struck in 2008, Colonial owned and operated this set of emergency generators. It purchased a new set of generators in 2012 and stationed them in Mississippi, inland and out of the direct path of most storms.

=== Spill history ===
- Early on September 2, 1970, residents of Jacksonville, Maryland, detected gasoline odors and noticed gasoline in a small creek flowing beneath a nearby road. That afternoon, a resident notified Colonial at 6:19 p.m. of concern. Colonial had 30-inch-diameter pipeline situated about 1,700 feet (520 m) east of the point where the creek passed under the road, and shut down the Dorsey Junction, Maryland, pump station (the initial pump station for this section of the pipeline) at 6:34 p.m. About 12 hours later, on the morning of September 3, an explosion and fire occurred in a ditch in which Colonial contract workers were manually digging to expose the pipeline and catch gasoline trickling from the ground. Five persons were injured, none fatally. The leak point was found four days later. The failure resulted in a release of 30,186 gallons (718 barrels) of gasoline and kerosene.
- At 9:51 p.m. on December 19, 1991, Colonial's Line 2, a 36-inch-diameter petroleum products pipeline, ruptured about 2.8 miles downstream of the company's Simpsonville, South Carolina, pump station. The rupture allowed more than 500,000 gallons (13,100 barrels) of Diesel fuel to flow into Durbin Creek, causing environmental damage that affected 26 miles of waterways, including the Enoree River, which flows through Sumter National Forest. The spill also forced Clinton and Whitmire, South Carolina, to use alternative water supplies.
- On Sunday, March 28, 1993, at 8:48 a.m., a pressurized 36-inch-diameter (910 mm) petroleum product pipeline owned and operated by Colonial Pipeline Company ruptured near Herndon, Virginia, a Washington, D.C., suburb. The rupture created a geyser that sprayed diesel fuel more than 75 feet (23 m) into the air, coating overhead power lines and adjacent trees, and misting adjacent Virginia Electric & Power Company buildings. The diesel fuel spewed from the rupture into an adjacent storm water management pond and flowed overland and through a network of storm sewer pipes before reaching Sugarland Run Creek, a tributary of the Potomac River.
- In October 1994, after heavy rainfall in the Houston area, failures of eight pipelines occurred with damage to 29 others. Two of the failures included Colonial Pipeline lines. The failures occurred at a crossing of the San Jacinto river. The river, which normally flows at 2.5 feet above sea level, crested at 28 feet above sea level on October 21. The flooding caused major soil erosion. Colonial's 40-inch gasoline pipeline failed on October 20 at 8:31 a.m. and by 9:51 a.m., explosions and fires erupted on the river. Colonial's 36-inch (Diesel) pipeline ruptured about 2 p.m. on the same day, although it had previously been temporarily out of service, limiting the amount of the spill.
- On June 26, 1996, a 36-inch diameter Colonial pipeline ruptured at the Reedy River, near Fork Shoals, South Carolina. The ruptured pipeline released about 957,600 US gallons (3,625,000 L) of fuel oil into the Reedy River and surrounding areas. The spill polluted a 34-mile (55 km) stretch of the Reedy River, causing significant environmental damage. Floating oil extended about 23 miles (37 km) downriver. Approximately 35,000 fish were killed, along with other aquatic organisms and wildlife. The estimated cost to Colonial Pipeline for cleanup and settlement with the State of South Carolina was $20.5 million. No one was injured in the accident. The pipeline was operating at reduced pressure due to known corrosion issues, but pipeline operator confusion led to an accidental return to normal pressure in that pipeline section, causing the rupture.
- On May 30, 1997, Colonial Pipeline spilled approximately 18,900 US gallons (72,000 L) of gasoline, some of which entered an unnamed creek and its adjoining shoreline in the Bear Creek watershed near Athens, Georgia. During the spill, a vapor cloud of gasoline formed, causing several Colonial employees to flee for safety. This spill resulted from a calculation error related to a regular procedure. No one checked the calculations, nor did Colonial have a procedure in place to check such calculations.
- In February 1999, in Knoxville, Tennessee, Colonial spilled approximately 53,550 gallons (1275 barrels) of fuel oil, some of which entered Goose Creek and the Tennessee River, polluting approximately eight miles of the Tennessee River. The released fuel saturated 10 homes in the area and caused the evacuation of six homes. The day before the spill, Colonial found anomalies on the pipeline, including on the area where the rupture later occurred, but did nothing. At the time of the spill, Colonial received information of a sudden drop in pipeline pressure. Despite receiving this information indicating a leak, Colonial continued to send fuel oil through the line. Colonial briefly shut down the pipeline, but reopened it and sent fuel oil again, despite continued indications of a leak, until they were alerted by the Knoxville Fire Department that Colonial's fuel was running into Goose Creek.
- On Wednesday, October 3, 2012, Colonial Pipeline shut down line 19 and 20 in Chattanooga, Tennessee, due to reports of gasoline odors. Reuters reported that about 500 gallons of gasoline may have been released. The line carrying gasoline was repaired and the distillate line, which carries Diesel fuel, jet fuel and other products, was inspected and found to be undamaged. Both lines were restarted two days later on October 5, 2012.
- September 21, 2015, a leak was discovered in Centreville, Virginia, by a local restaurant employee. The leak was estimated to have released 4,000 gallons of hydrocarbon product over the course of the preceding 2 weeks. Product was located and removed from the downstream retention pond adjacent to a townhome community.
- On Friday, September 9, 2016, a leak was detected in Shelby County, Alabama, spilling an estimated 252,000 US gallons (954,000 L) of summer-grade gasoline, requiring a partial shutdown of the pipeline and threatening fuel shortages in the southeastern United States. This was Colonial's "biggest spill in nearly two decades". It caused a "12-day interruption in the flow of about 1.3 million barrels per day of the fuel from the refining hub on the Gulf Coast to the Northeast."
- On October 31, 2016, a Colonial Pipeline mainline exploded and burned in Shelby County, Alabama, after accidentally being hit by a trackhoe during repairs related to the September event. One worker died at the scene, and five others were hospitalized, one of whom later died of his injuries. The explosion occurred several miles from the September 9, 2016 breach. On November 1, 2016, the U.S. Occupational Safety and Health Administration had control of the site, where the fire was still burning. The shutdown was affecting primarily the Southeast, as Northeast markets can receive some oil by water. The line returned to service November 6.
- In the summer of 2020, a Colonial Pipeline gasoline pipeline leaked 2 million gallons into the Oehler Nature Preserve near Huntersville, North Carolina, without detection. After detection by a group of teenagers, it took Colonial five days to repair the 5-foot crack (1.5 m) in the pipeline. As of February 2021, Colonial recovered 800,000 gallons of gasoline and 200,000 gallons of contaminated water. Neither NC Department of Environmental Quality nor Pipeline and Hazardous Materials Safety Administration assessed fines.

== Representation in media ==
The enormous scale of the Colonial Pipeline Project attracted considerable media attention. Fortune magazine featured the project as its cover story in February 1963. Colonial was featured in an August 1964 edition of Time magazine in an article titled, "The Invisible Network: A Revolution Underground". An article in a late 1965 edition of Pipeline Magazine included: "Colonial Pipeline will perhaps do more to change America's transportation and marketing operations in the East and South than any single undertaking in which our country has participated in recent years."

== See also ==
- Lists of pipelines
