= Buckeye Partners =

Petroleum company

Buckeye Partners, L.P.

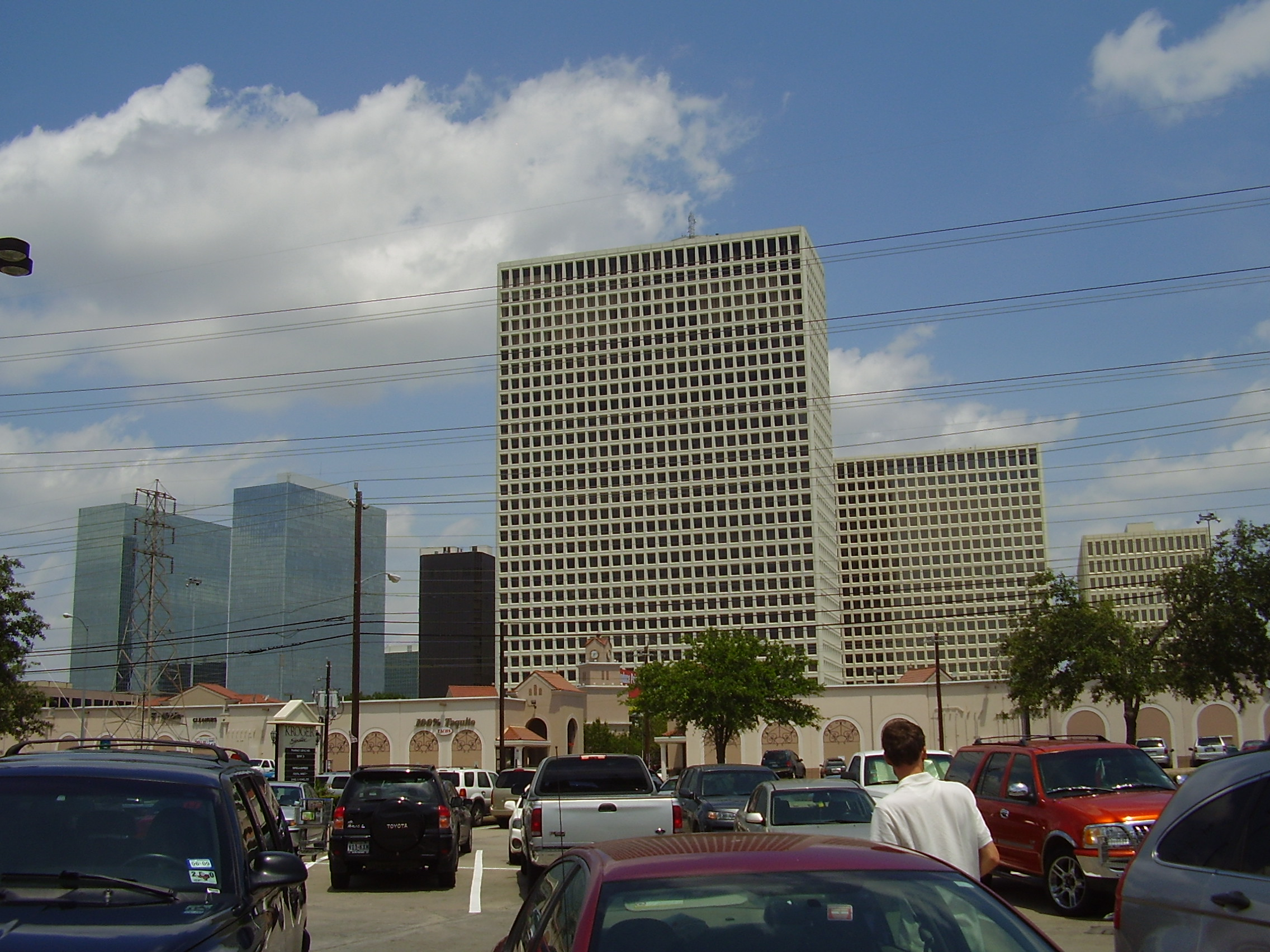
- Global headquarters of Buckeye Partners in Greenway Plaza
- Type: Subsidiary (1886–1911, 1964-1986, 2019-present); Private (1911-1964, 1986-2006); Public (2006-2019)
- Traded as: NYSE: BPL (2006-2019)
- Industry: Petroleum
- Founded: 1886 as Buckeye Pipeline Company
- Headquarters: Houston, Texas, United States
- Key people: Todd J. Russo, CEO
- Products: Pipelines & Terminals
- Revenue: ▲US$6.620 Billion (FY 2014)
- Net income: ▲US$274.9 Million (FY 2014)
- Total assets: ▲US$8.086 Billion (FY 2014)
- Owner: Standard Oil (1886-1911) Penn Central (1964-1986) IFM Investors (2019-present)
- Number of employees: 1,870 (2017)
- Website: buckeye.com

Buckeye Partners, formerly known as the Buckeye Pipeline Company, is a distributor of petroleum in the East and Midwest areas of the United States. A direct descendant of Standard Oil, the company is considered one of the largest independent oil pipelines in the United States. Its global headquarters is located in Houston's River Oaks District, and it maintains an additional U.S. headquarters in Allentown, Pennsylvania.

Its predecessor company, the Buckeye Pipe Line Company, was founded in 1886 as part of John D. Rockefeller's Standard Oil. It existed as a subsidiary until it became an independent company after Standard Oil's dissolution in 1911. It changed its name to Buckeye Partners in 1986 during a reorganization that transitioned it into a master limited partnership. The company expanded by buying oil pipelines from mainstream petroleum companies. In 1942, the company purchased Indiana Pipe Line. In 2004, its $517 million acquisition of refined petroleum pipelines and terminals from Shell was approved by the Federal Trade Commission.

Buckeye manages over 6,200 miles (10,000 km) of petroleum pipelines and over 100 truck-loading terminals. Many of its pipelines follow historic Northeastern railroad rights-of-way, and the firm is a surviving fragment of the defunct Penn Central railroad. Among Buckeye's clients were major airports in New York City, leading it to being listed by US federal prosecutors as among the targets of the 2007 John F. Kennedy International Airport attack plot.

In 2019, IFM Investors acquired Buckeye Partners for $10.3 billion in an all-cash deal, paying Buckeye Partners shareholders $41.50 per share. Buckeye Partners is now a wholly owned subsidiary of IFM under its "Global Infrastructure Fund".

== Facilities ==
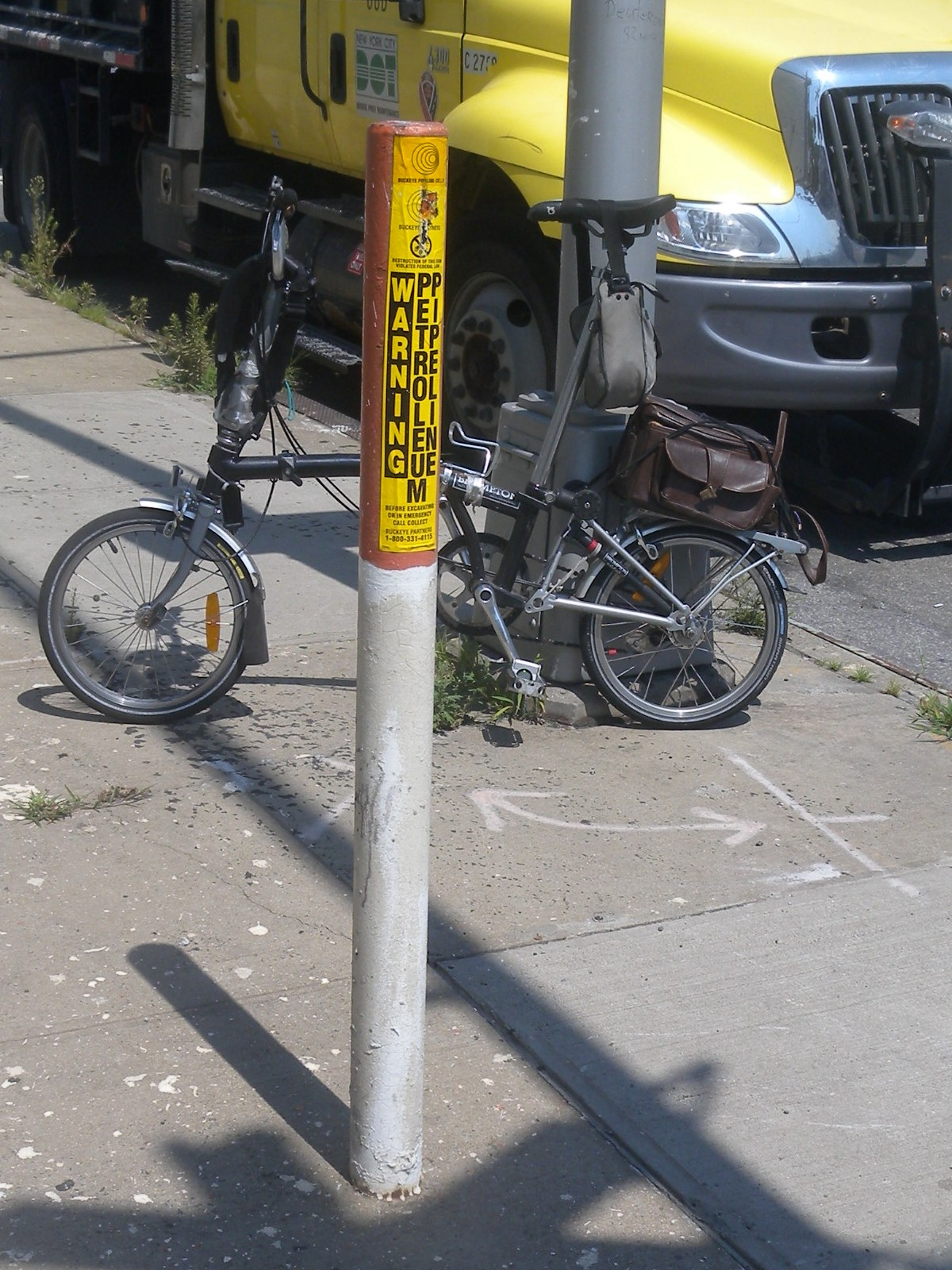
Warning stake in New York City

- Perth Amboy Refinery
- The North Line System - A 309 mile refined products pipeline connecting Wood River Refinery in Roxana, Illinois to a company terminal in Peotone, Illinois. The system includes two onward connections, one to Hammond, Indiana and one to a company terminal in Summit, Illinois. The 96,000 barrel-per-day pipeline was constructed in 1952 by Shell Oil Company. Buckeye Partners acquired the system from Shell in 2004.
