= Lists of environmental topics =

The natural environment, commonly referred to simply as the environment, is all living and non-living things that occur naturally on Earth or some part of it (e.g. the natural environment in a country). This includes complete ecological units that function as natural systems without massive human intervention, including all vegetation, animals, microorganisms, rocks, atmosphere and natural phenomena that occur within their boundaries. It includes universal natural resources and physical phenomena that lack clear-cut boundaries, such as air, water, and climate, as well as energy, radiation, electric charge, and magnetism, not originating from human activity.

== General lists ==
- List of anti-nuclear groups
- List of Areas of Critical Environmental Concern in Colorado
- List of atmospheric dispersion models
- List of California Air Districts
- List of car-free places
- List of climate change initiatives
- List of climate change topics
- List of climate research satellites
- List of coalfields
- List of composting systems
- List of conservation issues
- List of conservation topics
- List of crimes involving radioactive substances
- List of dams and reservoirs
- List of disaster films
- List of environmental agencies in the United States
- List of environmental agreements
- List of environmental dates
- List of environmental degrees
- List of environmental film festivals
- List of environmental films
- List of environmental health hazards
- List of environmental history topics
- List of environmental issues
- List of environmental laws by country
- List of environmental lawsuits
- List of environmental ministries
- List of environmental organizations
- List of environmental research institutes
- List of environmental studies topics
- List of environmental topics
- List of environmental websites
- List of films about nuclear issues
- List of flash floods
- List of forest research institutes
- List of forestry ministries
- List of forestry technical schools
- List of forestry universities and colleges
- List of fuel cell vehicles
- List of global sustainability statistics
- List of Green topics
- List of historic schools of forestry
- List of international environmental agreements
- List of Kyoto Protocol signatories
- List of largest oil and gas companies by revenue
- List of largest unfragmented rivers
- List of largest wilderness areas in the United States
- List of low emissions locomotives
- List of March for Science locations
- List of most polluted cities in the world
- List of National Wildlife Refuges at risk from the Deepwater Horizon oil spill
- List of National Wildlife Refuges established for endangered species
- List of natural gas fields
- List of natural gas pipelines
- List of nature centres in Australia
- List of nuclear close calls
- List of nuclear test sites
- List of nuclear waste treatment technologies
- List of nuclear weapon test locations
- List of nuclear weapons tests
- List of oil and gas fields of the Barents Sea
- List of oil fields
- List of oil pipelines
- List of oil refineries
- List of old growth forests
- List of open-pit mines
- List of parties to the Environmental Modification Convention
- List of periods and events in climate history
- List of populated places affected by the 2010 Haiti earthquake
- List of previously issued tornado emergencies
- List of proposed geoengineering schemes
- List of pseudoscientific water fuel inventions
- List of renewable energy organizations
- List of renewable energy technologies
- List of renewable energy topics by country
- List of renewable resources produced and traded by the United Kingdom
- List of reservoirs by surface area
- List of solid waste treatment technologies
- List of sperm whale strandings
- List of sterile insect technique trials
- List of Superfund sites in the United States
- List of supranational environmental agencies
- List of sustainable agriculture topics
- List of sustainable buildings in Australia
- List of tallest smokestacks in Canada
- List of threatened ecological communities of Western Australia
- List of topics related to global warming
- List of types of formally designated forests
- List of U.S. states by carbon dioxide emissions
- List of United States federal environmental statutes
- List of waste disposal incidents
- List of waste management acronyms
- List of waste management companies
- List of waste types
- List of waste water treatment technologies
- List of wilderness study areas
- Lists of reservoirs and dams

== Lists of countries ==
- List of countries by carbon dioxide emissions
- List of countries by carbon dioxide emissions per capita
- List of countries by coal production
- List of countries by ecological footprint
- List of countries by electricity consumption
- List of countries by electricity production
- List of countries by electricity production from renewable sources
- List of countries by energy consumption per capita
- List of countries by energy intensity
- List of countries by forest area
- List of countries by freshwater withdrawal
- List of countries by greenhouse gas emissions
- List of countries by greenhouse gas emissions per capita
- List of countries by irrigated land area
- List of countries by natural disaster risk
- List of countries by natural gas consumption
- List of countries by natural gas exports
- List of countries by natural gas imports
- List of countries by natural gas production
- List of countries by natural gas proven reserves
- List of countries by net oil exports
- List of countries by oil consumption
- List of countries by oil exports
- List of countries by oil imports
- List of countries by oil production
- List of countries by percentage of water area
- List of countries by proven oil reserves
- List of countries by recoverable shale gas
- List of countries by total length of pipelines
- List of countries by total primary energy consumption and production
- List of countries by total renewable water resources
- List of oil-producing states
- List of Ramsar Convention contracting parties
- List of states with nuclear weapons

== Lists of disasters ==
- List of environmental disasters
- List of environmental incidents in the fossil fuel industry in Australia
- List of gold mining disasters
- List of man-made disasters
- List of man-made mass chronic poisoning incidents
- List of nuclear and radiation accidents by country
- List of oil spills
- List of pipeline accidents
- List of pipeline accidents in the United States
- List of pipeline accidents in the United States before 1900
- List of pipeline accidents in the United States (1900–1949)
- List of pipeline accidents in the United States (1950–1974)
- List of pipeline accidents in the United States (1975–1999)
- List of pipeline accidents in the United States in the 21st century
- List of power outages
- List of tornadoes causing 100 or more deaths
- Lists of nuclear disasters and radioactive incidents

== Lists of emissions into the air ==
- Criteria air contaminants
- Flue-gas emissions from fossil-fuel combustion
- Motor vehicle emissions
- Wildland fire emission

== Lists of people ==
- Heroes of the Environment (2007)
- Heroes of the Environment (2008)
- Heroes of the Environment (2009)
- List of American non-fiction environmental writers
- List of anti-nuclear advocates in Germany
- List of anti-nuclear advocates in the United States
- List of climate scientists
- List of conservationists
- List of environmental killings
- List of environmental engineers
- List of environmental lawyers
- List of environmental philosophers
- List of ministers of climate change
- List of ministers of natural environment of Brazil
- List of non-fiction environmental writers
- List of pro-nuclear environmentalists

== Lists of people and organizations ==
- Global 500 Roll of Honour
- List of environment and forest research institutes in India
- List of population concern organizations
- List of rare breed livestock charities

== Lists of power stations ==
- List of coal power stations
- List of conventional hydroelectric power stations
- List of fuel oil power stations
- List of geothermal power stations
- List of largest hydroelectric power stations
- List of largest power stations in the United States
- List of largest power stations in the world
- List of least carbon efficient power stations
- List of natural gas power stations
- List of nuclear power stations
- List of nuclear reactors
- List of offshore wind farms
- List of onshore wind farms
- List of photovoltaic power stations
- List of pumped-storage hydroelectric power stations
- List of run-of-the-river hydroelectric power stations
- List of solar thermal power stations
- List of tidal power stations
- List of wave power stations
- Lists of offshore wind farms by country
- Lists of offshore wind farms by water area
- Lists of wind farms by country

== Lists of publications ==
- List of Australian environmental books
- List of books about coal mining
- List of books about energy issues
- List of books about nuclear issues
- List of climate change books
- List of environmental books
- List of environmental economics journals
- List of environmental journals
- List of environmental law reviews and journals
- List of environmental periodicals
- List of environmental reports
- List of environmental social science journals
- List of environmental websites
- List of forestry journals
- List of planning journals

== Lists of species ==
- List of endangered species threatened by the Deepwater Horizon oil spill
- List of invasive species
- List of threatened fauna of Michigan
- List of threatened flora of Australia
- List of threatened species of the Philippines
- List of wildlife species at risk
- List of the world's 100 worst invasive species
- Lists of mammals by population
- Rote Liste (German: "Red List")

== Lists of terminology ==
- Air pollution dispersion terminology

== Glossaries ==
- Glossary of climate change
- Glossary of ecology
- Glossary of environmental science
- Glossary of wildfire terms

== Indexes ==
- Index of biodiversity articles
- Index of climate change articles
- Index of conservation articles
- Index of Earth science articles
- Index of energy articles
- Index of fishing articles
- Index of forestry articles
- Index of genetic engineering articles
- Index of meteorology articles
- Index of pesticide articles
- Index of plate tectonics articles
- Index of radiation articles
- Index of recycling articles
- Index of solar energy articles
- Index of sustainability articles
- Index of urban planning articles
- Index of urban studies articles
- Index of environmental articles
- Index of waste management articles

== Outlines ==
- Outline of ecology
- Outline of energy
- Outline of environmental journalism
- Outline of fishing
- Outline of forestry
- Outline of mining
- Outline of nuclear technology
- Outline of water

== Tables ==
- Table of biofuel crop yields
- Table of historic and prehistoric climate indicators

== Timelines ==
- Carbon capture and storage (timeline)
- Central Plains Water Enhancement Scheme Timeline
- Timeline of the 1990 Pacific hurricane season
- Timeline of the 1992 Pacific hurricane season
- Timeline of the 1997 Pacific hurricane season
- Timeline of the 2002 Pacific hurricane season
- Timeline of the 2004 Pacific hurricane season
- Timeline of the 2005 Pacific hurricane season
- Timeline of the 2006 Pacific hurricane season
- Timeline of the 2007 Pacific hurricane season
- Timeline of the 2008 Pacific hurricane season
- Timeline of the 2009 Pacific hurricane season
- Timeline of the 2011 Pacific hurricane season
- Timeline of the 2012 Pacific hurricane season
- Timeline of alcohol fuel
- Timeline of the Deepwater Horizon oil spill
- Timeline of the Deepwater Horizon oil spill (May 2010)
- Timeline of the Deepwater Horizon oil spill (June 2010)
- Timeline of the Deepwater Horizon oil spill (July 2010)
- Timeline of the Deepwater Horizon oil spill (August 2010)
- Timeline of environmental events
- Timeline of environmental history
- Timeline of the Fukushima Daiichi nuclear disaster
- Timeline of the Fukushima Daini nuclear accidents
- Timeline of genetically modified organisms
- Timeline of history of environmentalism
- Timeline of major U.S. environmental and occupational health regulation
- Timeline of Minamata disease
- Timeline of the New Zealand environment
- Timeline of nuclear weapons development
- Timeline of relief efforts after the 2010 Chile earthquake
- Timeline of relief efforts after the 2010 Haiti earthquake

== External lists ==
- Endemic Bird Areas of the World: Priorities for Biodiversity Conservation (book)
- Hazardous Waste and Substances Sites List
- National Priorities List
- Toxic 100

== See also ==
- Blacksmith Institute (see annual reports listing top problems)
- Environmental groups and resources serving K–12 schools
- Global 200 (list of ecoregions identified by the World Wildlife Fund [WWF] as priorities for conservation)
- The World's 25 Most Endangered Primates
- The World's 100 Most Threatened Species
- List of watershed topics
