= List of environmental lawyers =

This is a list of notable environmental lawyers.

Name	Lifespan	Nationality	Significance
Bruce Babbitt	June 27, 1938 (age 88)	American	Babbitt was United States Secretary of the Interior, Governor of Arizona, and Attorney General of Arizona.
Bob Brown	1944-	Australian	Inaugural Leader of the Australian Greens (2005-2012) in the Parliament of Australia, as a Senator for Tasmania
Nannette Jolivette Brown	1963–present	American	Brown is the current Judge of the United States District Court for the Eastern District of Louisiana.
Bradley M. Campbell	1961–present	American	Campbell was the Regional Administrator of the U.S. Environmental Protection Agency's Middle Atlantic Region.
Alexandra Dunn			Dunn is a law professor. She was formerly Executive Director and General Counsel of the Environmental Council of the States (ECOS),
David Fleischaker	1944–present	American	Fleischaker served as the Oklahoma Secretary of Energy from 2003 to 2008.
Dario Hunter	1983–present	American	Hunter is the first Muslim-born person to be ordained a rabbi.
Janet Keeping	1971–present	Canadian	Lecturer in the Faculty of Law at University of Calgary, Director of Russian Program for Canadian Institute of Resources Law, Honorary Professor of Law at Tyumen State University in Russia, awarded Medal of Service by the Academic Council of Tomsk State University in Russia, Leader of the Green Party of Alberta.
Robert F. Kennedy, Jr.	January 17, 1954 (age 72)	American	Kennedy is president of Waterkeeper Alliance. He is also an attorney and environmental activist. He is a son of Robert F. Kennedy and nephew of former President John F. Kennedy.
Peter Lehner	1958–present	American	Lehner is a lawyer and environmentalist. He is currently the executive director of Natural Resources Defense Council
Eva Ligeti		Canadian	Ligeti served as Ontario's first Environmental Commissioner from 1994 to 1999.
Harvey Locke		Canadian	Founder of Yellowstone to Yukon Conservation Initiative, served as advisor to various nature conservation organizations, sits on the World Commission on Protected Areas.
Mahesh Chandra Mehta		Indian	Mehta is known for his continuous fights in Indian courts against pollution-causing industries. He received the Goldman Environmental Prize in 1996.
Miles Tolbert		American	Tolbert served as Oklahoma Secretary of the Environment from January 2003 to August 2008.
John Roche	September 26, 1949 (age 77)	American	Roche was a professional basketball player in the NBA and a lawyer.
Andrew Sacks		American	Sacks is an attorney and managing partner of the Philadelphia law firm Sacks Weston Millstein Diamond, LLC.
Pallavoor Sahasranaman		Indian	Sahasranaman has served as Amicus Curiae and Advocate Commissioner at the High Court of the Indian State of Kerala.
Dianne Saxe		Canadian	
Yvonne Scannell			She is a professor of Environmental Law at Law School in Ireland.
David Sive	September 22, 1922 – March 12, 2014	American	Sive is a pioneer in environmental law.
James Gustave Speth	March 4, 1942 – present	American	Speth is known for his environment work in tasks forces and committees. He is a professor at Vermont Law School.
Paul Stein	January 4, 1939 – June 22, 2024	Australian	Stein was a lawyer and judge. He is known for his contributions to environmental and planning law.
Jon Wellinghoff	May 30, 1949 (age 77)	American	Wellinghoff served as the chairman of the Federal Energy Regulatory Commission (FERC) from 2009 to 2013.
