= List of nature centres in Australia =

The following is a list of notable nature centres and environmental education centres in Australia:

Name	Location	State	Summary
Alice Springs Reptile Centre	Alice Springs	Northern Territory	Reptile and environmental education centre
Canning River Eco Education Centre	Wilson	Western Australia	Natural history and importance of the Canning River, located in 266-hectares Canning River Regional Park (website)
Cockburn Wetland Centre	Bibra Lake	Western Australia	Gateway to the Beeliar Regional Park (website)
Coolart Wetlands and Homestead Reserve	Somers	Victoria	Late 19th century mansion-like homestead, gardens and nature reserve
Futureworld	Warrawong	New South Wales	Hands-on exhibits about solutions to environmental challenges (website)
Greenbushes Eco Cultural Discovery Centre	Greenbushes	Western Australia	Area’s natural history, environment, industry and heritage (website)
Herdsman Lake Wildlife Centre	Wembley	Western Australia	(website)
Ipswich Nature Centre	Ipswich	Queensland	Located in Queens Park (website)
Moreton Bay Environmental Education Centre	Wynnum	Queensland	(website)
Piney Lakes Environmental Education Centre	Booragoon	Western Australia	Focus on the environment and sustainable living (website)
Rockingham Regional Environment Centre	Rockingham	Western Australia	Focus on environmental issues and sustainable lifestyle choices (website)
Wetlands Environmental Education Centre	Newcastle	New South Wales	Part of the Hunter Wetlands Centre (website)
Wirraminna Environmental Education Centre	Burrumbuttock	New South Wales	4 hectares
Tamar Island Wetlands Centre	Launceston	Tasmania	Located on the outskirts of Launceston, mudflats, lagoons and islands are unique estuarine wetland ecosystems. With rich plant and animal resources, it is a paradise for various birds, mammals, reptiles, frogs, fish, and invertebrates.
Broome Bird Observatory	Broome	Western Australia	As a research and education facility, their aim is to work for the conservation of the migratory shorebirds which visit Roebuck Bay.

== See also ==
- List of nature centers
