= Trapp, Kentucky =

Unincorporated community in Kentucky, United States

Coordinates: 37°53′00″N 84°03′18″W

Trapp is an unincorporated community in Clark County, in the U.S. state of Kentucky.

== History ==
A post office called Trap was established in 1904, and remained in operation until 1908. The community was so named on account of trappers who did business there, according to local history.

In 1961, Trapp was the scene of a natural gas transmission line explosion which injured 22 people.
