= Yvonne Scannell =

Professor of Environmental Law

Honora Josephine Yvonne Scannell
- Education: Cambridge University (master's degree)
- Alma mater: Trinity College, Dublin (doctorate)
- Occupation: Professor of Environmental Law
- Employer(s): Trinity College, Dublin Law School
- Known for: Campaigning against the proposed 2002 Irish Constitution amendment regarding abortion
- Notable work: Leading textbook in Ireland on Environmental Law
- Board member of: Tara Mines, Coillte, CIE
- Awards: Spirit of Columbus Award (1994)

Honora Josephine Yvonne Scannell was Professor of Environmental Law in Trinity College, Dublin Law School, Ireland. She received a master's degree from Cambridge University and a doctorate from Trinity College, Dublin.

As well as lecturing, she works as a consultant in Environmental, Planning and Climate Change Law at the Arthur Cox law firm in Dublin, a post that she has held since April 1990. She is also currently a director on the boards of Tara Mines, Coillte and CIE She has written the leading textbook in Ireland on that subject.

Scannell is a qualified barrister in King's Inns. She was the 100th woman to be called to the Irish bar. She received the Spirit of Columbus Award for her Contribution to the Environment in 1994 and was the Francis E Lewis scholar at the Washington and Lee University School of Law, in Virginia, United States, in 1996. She is widely published in a number of peer-reviewed journals, including the Irish Planning and Environmental Journal. In 2002, she campaigned with her fellow professor Ivana Bacik against the proposed amendment to the Irish Constitution that would have removed suicide as a grounds for abortion.

== Publications ==
=== Books ===
- Environmental and Land Use Law (Thomson Round Hall) (Brehon Series) (2005)
- Environmental and Planning Law, Irish Academic Press, 1995
- The Habitats Directive in Ireland (with Clarke, Cannon, Doyle) (Centre for Environmental Policy and Law) (1999. Reprinted 2000).
- Ireland, International Encyclopaedia of Laws, The Hague, Kluwer, 1994,
- The Law and Practice Relating to Pollution Control in Ireland, (2nd edn), London: Graham and Trotman, 1982,
- The Law and Practice Relating to Pollution Control in Ireland, London: Graham and Trotman,
