= List of rare breed livestock charities =

Rare breed livestock consists of breeds of domesticated animal, generally developed for use in agriculture, which are considered by one or more national charity as being endangered or threatened. A number of societies exist worldwide to preserve these animals.

== International ==
- Rare Breeds International
- Europe: SAVE Foundation (Safeguard for Agricultural Varieties in Europe)

== Africa ==
- South Africa: Farm Animal Conservation Trust (FACT)

== Australasia ==
- Australia: Rare Breeds Trust of Australia
- New Zealand: Rare Breeds Conservation Society of New Zealand

== North America ==
- Canada: Rare Breeds Canada
- United States:

The Livestock Conservancy
SVF Foundation

== Europe ==
- Germany:

Gesellschaft zur Erhaltung alter und gefährdeter Haustierrassen (GEH)
Vielfältige Initiative zur Erhaltung gefährdeter Haustierrassen (VIEH)

- Switzerland: ProSpecieRara
- Netherlands: Scichting Zeldzame Huisdierrassen (SZH)
- United Kingdom: Rare Breeds Survival Trust
- France: Fédération pour promouvoir l'Elevage des Races domestiques MEnacées (FERMES)
- Spain: Sociedad Española para los Recursos Genéticos Animales (/SERGA)
- Belgium: Steunpunt Levend Erfgoed (Support Centre for Living Heritage)
- Norway: NordGen Husdyr (Nordic Farm Animal Gene Bank)
