= List of pipeline accidents in the United States (1900–1949) =

The following is only a sample of natural gas and petroleum product accidents for this era. Gas and oil leaks and explosions were not tracked in an organized fashion except by fire marshals. Many leaks, fires, and explosions were not recorded unless they occurred in population centers with newspapers to report them.

Later in the twentieth century, the Pipeline and Hazardous Materials Safety Administration (PHMSA), a U.S. Department of Transportation agency, would be established to develop and enforce regulations for the safe and environmentally sound operation of the United States' pipelines, and to collect data on pipeline leaks, accidents, and explosions.

== 1900s ==
=== 1900 ===
- December 20 – In Beaver Falls, Pennsylvania, two children were fatally burned and five injured in a gas explosion and fires that destroyed three houses. The explosions were caused by the breaking of a valve gate on the Fort Pitt Gas Line, which allowed leaking gas to seep into the houses' cellars, following water pipes from the street.

=== 1901 ===
- May – Three teachers and a plumber were injured by a gas explosion at Saint Michael's Roman Catholic Church parish school in Pittsburgh, Pennsylvania.
- October – In Boston, Massachusetts, five women narrowly escaped being burned alive after a leaking gas meter exploded in the basement of their three-story tenement, starting a fire that ascended through the stairwells and drove them out the upper windows where they clung to the ledges until firefighters rescued them with extension ladders.

=== 1902 ===
- February 21 – In Rochester, New York, an explosion destroyed a building at the works of the Rochester Gas and Electric Company. The loss was estimated at $20,000.

=== 1903 ===
- May – An oil well driller in eastern Ohio struck gas which ignited and exploded after escaping from the well. The derrick burned, and three men and an eight-year-old boy were seriously injured by the explosion.

=== 1904 ===
- January – In Marion, Indiana, three were killed, four fatally injured and eight dangerously injured when a hotel burned after a gas leak exploded, probably due to increased pressure in the mains. The loss was estimated at $50,000.
- December 1 – In Winchester, Massachusetts, a lighted match dropped into a sewer manhole by an employee of the Arlington gaslight company set off an explosion which injured five gas line repairmen and blew the steel manhole cover 30 feet into the air. The gas ignited along the sewer line into Rangeley, where two more manhole covers were blown into the air. The gas company's official statement was that the gas was ignited by a spark from a pickaxe.

=== 1905 ===
- February – In Hastings, Pennsylvania, two employees of the Hope Gas Company were killed while repairing a leak in a 12-inch diameter natural gas pipeline, which exploded so violently that their clothes were blown off their bodies.

=== 1906 ===
- November 22 – In Cherryville, Kansas, five Australians working on the Kansas Natural Gas Company's pipeline to Joplin were badly burned by an explosion "through misunderstanding or neglect."

=== 1907 ===
- August – A gas explosion shook Boston's South End after new machinery ignited a gas leak in the one-story brick engine house of the Boston Consolidated Gas Company, where natural gas was pumped to three huge reservoirs holding 2,000,000 cubic feet of gas. The engineer, knowing the fire could spread to the reservoirs, ignored his burning clothes and rushed to close the valves between the engine house and the reservoirs, saving the South End from a disaster. Seven workmen including the engineer were seriously injured.

=== 1908 ===
- March 28 – In South Deerfield, Massachusetts, a tank used for supplying gas to houses and stores exploded, killing two men and injuring two others. Hundreds of windows shattered from the force of the blast, and a small building near the tank was demolished. Leaking gas was thought to have been ignited by the flame from a lantern.
- July 31 – In Haysville, Pennsylvania, a gas explosion demolished a varnish factory building and broke 500 windows in the town, doing $6000 of damage.

=== 1909 ===
- December 14 – In Topeka, Kansas, six men were seriously injured when gas trapped in a fire cistern exploded. Two were cleaning out the cistern when another man struck a match to light a cigar and the explosion followed.

== 1910s ==
=== 1910 ===
- September 9 – In Oklahoma, a cigar-smoking cashier inadvertently blew up his own bank when he walked into his workplace, which had a gas leak. The cashier was bruised and scorched but not seriously injured.

=== 1911 ===
- January 15 – Four persons were killed and four injured in a natural gas explosion at Niobrara, Nebraska. The explosion was caused by a leak from a gas plant in a hotel's cellar. The resulting fire burned the three-story frame hotel to the ground.
- June 26 – In Estes Park, Colorado, an explosion of gas in the Stanley Hotel endangered the lives of 20 guests and fatally injured one. The Stanley, a new $500,000 four-story hotel lighted by electricity, had a gas plant for emergency use. Guests noticed the odor of gas the previous day and at night the leak was found on the second floor by employees with lighted candles who set off the explosion.
- September 18 – In Schenectady, New York, the explosion of a gas generating tank in the basement of the Exchange building resulted in the death of the owner of a confectionery store. The building was considerably damaged by the fire which followed the explosion. Firemen found the confectioner's body in the basement.

=== 1912 ===
- May 13 – In Parkersburg, West Virginia, a gas explosion shook a woolen mill and injured three men, probably including the one searching for the gas leak with a lighted match. After the explosion, 200 mill girls employed on the fourth floor made their way down the fire escape in an orderly fashion. A fire followed but was quickly extinguished.
- October 2 – In Boston, Massachusetts, gas escaping from a subbasement gas main in a Beacon Street apartment hotel affected 34 residents while they were sleeping; two nearly suffocated.

=== 1913 ===
- January 24 – A natural gas explosion in an underground chamber of the Utah Light and Railway Company shattered a 200-pound cast iron manhole cover and threw the pieces into the air in downtown Salt Lake City, Utah, forcing pedestrians to take shelter as the debris rained down.
- February 17 – Near Kansas City, Missouri, twenty members of the Oak Grove Methodist Church were injured when a natural gas tank blew up in the basement of the church. The custodian, who had taken a lantern to find the source of the gas leak, was not expected to live.

=== 1914 ===
- June 14 – In Columbus, Ohio, 12 men were fatally injured and eight seriously burned when a gas main exploded while a group of workmen were repairing it. Four later died.
- December 15 – In Cleveland, Ohio, a two-story brick apartment house was demolished by a natural gas explosion. Seven were killed, nine hospitalized, three missing.

=== 1915 ===
- February 3 – In Kane, Pennsylvania, nine men were killed and six others injured in an explosion and fire caused by an exploding gas stove in a bunkhouse. All nine of the dead men were injured or rendered unconscious from the explosion and unable to help themselves by escaping from the fire.

=== 1916 ===
- July 12 – In Lafayette, Colorado, an explosion at the Western Light and Power Company injured none of the eight men in the building. Employees said the explosion was caused by accumulation of natural gas in the economizer in the fan room. The explosion did not interrupt gas service. The explosion in the feed pipes blew out the west wall of the fan house, causing about $1,000 in damage.

=== 1917 ===
- January 1 – In South Boston, Massachusetts, a paper boy was killed by a flying manhole cover, 11 persons were severely injured and property damage running into thousands of dollars was entailed in a terrific gas explosion that threw 13 manhole covers into the air. When gas company employees used pickaxes to uncover the leak to repair the pipe, it flamed up again.
- January – Near Ouray, Colorado, an untapped seep of natural gas near the ferry across the Green River exploded in a blast that was heard two miles away and hurled blocks of ice five feet square and more than a foot thick onto the riverbank.
- February 2 – In Chicago, Illinois, a gas explosion wrecked a tenement house, killing seven residents and injuring 21. Another 27 were missing. After the explosion, a pillar of fire rose from the ruins, indicating that gas was still leaking.

=== 1918 ===
- December 30 – In Lebanon, New Jersey, 12 people were killed and 12 others injured by two gas explosions in the post office's basement tank of artificial gas. The first explosion blew the roof from the building and the second caused the walls to collapse, burying victims in the debris. Nearly 20 persons were waiting in the post office for the evening mail when the explosions occurred, and everyone in the building was killed or injured. Several in the street were hurt by falling debris. Some of the injured were badly burned before they could be rescued from the wreckage.

=== 1919 ===
- February 16 – In Salt Lake City, Utah, natural gas escaping into a home nearly suffocated two boys and their dog. When their mother returned to the house, a wave of gas met her as she opened the door: the dog could only crawl and the boys were nearly asphyxiated by the gas but revived when treated at the hospital.
- March 8 – In San Pedro, California, on a freighter under construction in a shipyard, gas in a tank exploded, perhaps ignited by nearby riveters. One workman died and 21 were injured.

== 1920s ==
=== 1928 ===
- February 4 – A worker employed on a new gas pipeline was injured by an explosion, during welding on the pipeline, near Austin, Texas.

=== 1929 ===
- July 22 – Two oil company patrolmen were killed by an explosion of a gas pipeline near Castaic, California.

== 1930s ==
=== 1930 ===
- April 4 – Gas leaked into the sewer system in New York City, New York, and later exploded. 6 people were injured, 5,000 were evacuated from nearby buildings, and telephone cables were damaged.
- May 24 – A runaway horse smashed a wagon of lumber against a crude oil pipeline in Ripon, Wisconsin. The oil ignited and spread to nearby oil tanks, causing a blaze that destroyed a number of buildings.
- July 30 – Excavation in Fairport, New York caused a major gas explosion. 3 people were killed, 10 were injured, and a 4 family house was damaged by the blast and following fire.

=== 1931 ===
- April 17 – Four campers near Kilgore, Texas were burned to death when they were surrounded by gas from a pipeline leak that caught fire. The flames also spread to brush and timber in the area, preventing rescuers from reaching the bodies for 3 hours.

=== 1936 ===
- February 19 – A worker inside a sewer in Utica, New York ignited natural gas that had leaked into the sewer system. An explosion was triggered, and the following fire burned for more than 24 hours. 4,000 people were evacuated.
- November 21 – A pipeline serving a loading dock in Port Arthur, Texas, ruptured and ignited. The burning oil killed 3 people, and injured 6 others.

=== 1937 ===
- January 14 – An oil pipeline being repaired by gas welding exploded near Pryor, Oklahoma. 2 of the repair crew, and 4 wives of the repairmen were killed by the explosion and following fire.
- February 5 – A gas main thought to be damaged by flooding exploded in Louisville, Kentucky. At least 15 were injured, and a major fire swept through the area.
- March 18 – At 3:17 p.m. with just minutes left in the school day and more than 500 students and teachers inside the building, a natural gas explosion leveled most of New London High School in Rusk County, Texas. Odorless natural gas had leaked into the basement and ignited, killing 298 children, most in grades 5 to 11. Dozens more later died of injuries. As a result of this disaster, Texas passed laws requiring that natural gas be mixed with a malodorant to warn of a gas leak.
- July 21 – A gasoline explosion and fire hit a Phillips Pipeline pump station near Jefferson City, Missouri, injuring a truck driver there.

=== 1939 ===
- December 12 – A pipeline being tested ruptured for 40 miles (64 km), near Wichita Falls, Texas, injuring one person.

== 1940s ==
=== 1940 ===
- January 10 – A gas pipeline exploded while being worked on, near Waskom, Texas, killing 2 workers, and injuring a third man. There was no fire.
- April 4 – A gas compressor plant exploded in Braintree, Massachusetts, killing four people and injuring 12 others.
- August 29 – A newly hired crew of repairmen were working on fixing a pipeline leak near Buffalo, Oklahoma, when the pipeline exploded and started a fire. Seven of the crew were killed, 8 others were burned, and 10 horses burned to death.

=== 1942 ===
- October 5 – A crude oil pipeline broke near Wichita, Kansas, spilling crude oil into the Little Arkansas River. There was no fire or injuries.

=== 1943 ===
- January 18 – A grass fire near Tyler, Texas spread to a leak in an 8-inch diameter natural gas pipeline. The gas leak was initially small, but grew quickly, until the gas flames were about 200 feet (61 m) high. Gas service was cut to 28,000 people.
- May 17 – Flooding destroyed part of the "Big Inch" pipeline in Arkansas, causing nearly a week of shut down to build a bypass around the damaged area. There were no injuries reported.
- August 14 – The recently built "Big Inch" crude oil pipeline developed a leak near Lancaster, Pennsylvania, delaying the first batch of crude oil from that pipeline from reaching Philadelphia, Pennsylvania.
- September 5 – The "Big Inch" pipeline ruptured and burned near Lansdale, Pennsylvania, with burning crude oil spilling into a creek, and destroying over 100 trees. The creek had to have 2 temporary earth dams built on it to stop the burning crude from spreading further. There were no injuries reported.
- December 4 – The "Big Inch" started leaking near Okeana, Ohio. There were no injuries reported.

=== 1944 ===
- February 24 – The "Big Inch" crude oil pipeline ruptured in Connellsville, Pennsylvania, with the crude spill killing fish along a 12-mile (19 km) stretch of the Laurel Hill creek.
- July 31 – The "Big Inch" crude oil pipeline leaked, then exploded, near Longview, Texas. 2 pipeline workers were killed, and 2 other injured.

=== 1946 ===
- July 4 – A crew was working to connect a new gas main in Peru, Illinois, when the old gas main exploded, killing 5 of the work crew, and injuring 7 others.

=== 1947 ===
- July 27 – The "Big Inch" pipeline sprung a gas leak, near Great Bend, Kansas. A passing truck ignited the fumes, causing a massive explosion and fire, killing the truck driver.
- November 30 – An explosion hit a natural gas compressor station for a gas storage facility in Marion, Michigan. One worker was killed, and 6 others were injured, and gas service was interrupted in the area.

=== 1948 ===
- February 28 – Crude oil spilled from a ruptured pipeline leading to storage tank in Oklahoma City, Oklahoma. Some teen boys in the area saw crude oil bubbling out of manhole covers, and thought that igniting the oil would be a good idea. This caused a string of sewer explosions, causing manhole covers to fly 10 feet (3.0 m) into the air.
- March 18 – The 20 inch diameter "Little Big Inch" natural gas transmission pipeline near Petersburg, Indiana exploded and burned, throwing pieces of the pipe as far as 300 feet (91 m) away from the blast point. 3 homes were destroyed by the fire.
- May 9 – The "Little Big Inch" natural gas transmission pipeline exploded, near Woodson, Arkansas. There were no injuries.
- September 7 – A crude oil pipeline ruptured in Linden, New Jersey, coating roads in the area in oil.
- October 18 – Vapors from a leaking butane pipeline at a refinery in Texas City, Texas spread out along a nearby highway, causing a number of cars to stall. The gas then exploded, killing 4 people, and seriously burning 17 others.
- November 9 – A pressure valve exploded during work on it, near Bald Knob, Arkansas. One worker was killed.
- November 19 – A "Big Inch" gas pipeline pumping station had 2 explosions and caught fire near Seymour, Indiana, causing $3,000,000 in damage, and injuring 17 workers at the station. Flames reached 300 feet high.

=== 1949 ===
- January 18 – The "Big Inch" gas transmission pipeline ruptured and burned near Batesville, Indiana. The cause was an electrical arc at a compressor station. One worker at the compressor station had facial burns.
- March 4 – A section of the "Little Big Inch" exploded and burned in North Vernon, Indiana, burning a mother and her infant. It was the fourth explosion on that pipeline in Indiana that year.
- April 2 – The "Little Big Inch' gas pipeline exploded and burned, near Jonesboro, Arkansas. There were no injuries reported.
- July 16 – During the extraction of a pipeline cleaning tool, the "Big Inch" pipeline exploded in West Chester, Pennsylvania. One worker was killed, and 2 others injured. There was no fire reported.
- October 6 – The "Little Big Inch" gas pipeline exploded, near Marion, Illinois. There was no fire or injuries.
- November 17 – A road grader operator was seriously burned when his grader hit a 6-inch gas pipeline west of Mankato, Kansas.
- December 8 – An explosion and fire occurred at a compressor station for a 24-inch natural gas pipeline in Centralia, Missouri. Flames could be seen for 150 miles (240 km) away.
- December 14 – A leaking gas line caused an explosion at a packing plant in Sioux City, Iowa. Eighteen workers were killed, and almost 100 injured.
- December 15
  - A 22-inch natural gas pipeline exploded and burned near Carthage, Tennessee, injuring two people. Flames shot 1,000 feet (300 m) into the air.
  - In Detroit, Michigan a high pressure gas main went "out of control" when a new pressure regulator was being installed, leading to a number of large gas explosions. Police evacuated the area before the explosions, but, six people were injured, and 5 stores destroyed.
