= List of pipeline accidents in the United States (1950–1969) =

The following is a partial list of oil, petroleum, and gas pipeline accidents in the United States between 1950 and 1969.

== 1950s ==
=== 1950 ===
- January 20 – The "Big Inch" gas pipeline exploded and burned, near Caldwell, Ohio, causing 500 foot high flames, and damaging farm buildings. There were no injuries.
- March 13 – An overhead pipeline at a refinery in Martinez, California leaked, causing flammable fumes to spread onto a highway. An automobile ignited the fumes, killing a woman, and injuring two others in the vehicle. 3 automobiles were also burned.
- April 11 – Three separate explosions on the Big Inch gas transmission pipeline near Colonia, New Jersey were announced to be from hydrostatic testing of that pipeline for weaknesses.
- May 19 – The "Little Big Inch" exploded, near Somerset, Ohio, causing a 40 foot wide and 25 foot deep crater. There was no fire or injuries.
- July 1 – The "Big Inch" gas pipeline exploded and burned near Beallsville, Ohio. A house and a barn were destroyed by the fire.
- July 10 – The "Little Big Inch" gas pipeline exploded, near Jasper, Indiana, causing a 40 foot wide crater. There was no fire or injuries.
- July 14 – A gas main failed in Seattle, Washington, killing one person, and injuring 8 others. A nearby building was damaged by the explosion and fire.
- August 22 – Three workers were killed in an underground vault in Los Angeles, California when a gas main exploded. There was no fire.
- September 7 – A new natural gas pipeline exploded near Big Rapids, Michigan. Two barns were destroyed by the ensuing fire, which was seen for 50 miles.
- September 20
  - A brand new natural gas transmission pipeline exploded, while initial pressure was building up, near Wadley, Texas. About 300 yards of the pipe were ripped out of the ground.
  - A river crossing of a gas transmission pipeline exploded and burned, near Roanoke, Alabama. There were no injuries.
- November 24 – A newly built 30-inch natural gas pipeline ruptured for nearly 3,000 feet (910 m), causing a fire that destroyed two homes under construction near King of Prussia, Pennsylvania.

=== 1951 ===
- January 7 – Two men welding on a crude oil pipeline at an oil Terminal in Kansas City, Kansas were severely burned when a nearby valve failed, spraying them with crude oil that ignited. Both later died of their burns.
- January 10 – Two gas explosions, three hours apart, hit McKees Rock, Pennsylvania, injuring eight people, igniting a fire, and causing widespread damage.
- January 13 – The "Big Inch" gas pipeline exploded and burned, near Oran, Missouri. 4 people were injured.
- February 9 – Natural gas leaked from a gas line into a sewer system in Jefferson, Pennsylvania. The gas was involved in three separate home explosions, causing other homes to burn. Two people were killed, eight others injured, and six homes destroyed.
- September 21 – A gas main pressure regulator failed in Rochester, New York, causing a series of explosion that lasted for four hours. Three people were killed, and 30 homes were destroyed.
- October 31 – A Halloween parade in Pittsburgh, Pennsylvania was interrupted by four gas main explosions. 29 people were injured.
- November 27 – A 12-inch temporary gas transmission pipeline exploded and burned near Cranberry, Pennsylvania, causing a 200-foot (61 m) high flame that could be seen for a number of miles away. The explosion was heard for ten miles around. A pipeline compressor station under construction at the site was destroyed. A nearby elementary school was relocated following the failure.

=== 1952 ===
- January 15 – The "Big Inch" gas pipeline exploded and burned, near Oakland City, Indiana. 2 nearby railroad workers were injured.
- March 12 – A fire broke out at an oil pump station, near Granger, Wyoming. There were no injuries reported.
- May 17 – A brand new valve being added to the 20-inch "Little Inch" gas transmission pipeline split open near Marietta, Pennsylvania, knocking down pipeline company workers, two of whom were seriously injured. There was no fire.
- July 9 – A gas transmission pipeline exploded and burned near York, Pennsylvania.
- July 17 – A tractor hit a gas pipeline, and a following explosion and fire killed two men, near Ackerly, Texas.
- September 26 – Four men working on an 8-inch gas pipeline near Mount Pleasant, Michigan were burned when that pipeline ruptured as they raised it for reconditioning.
- October 18 – A 26-inch gas pipeline, a branch of the "Big Inch" pipeline, started leaking at an insulated flange in Liberty Corner, New Jersey. A road was closed during the leak.
- December 29 – Twelve persons were injured in a blast that shook the Lawndale district of Los Angeles, California, when a ditching machine broke a gasoline-carrying pipeline and touched off a fiery explosion.

=== 1953 ===
- January 6 – An explosion & fire on a gas pipeline in Edgerton, Wisconsin left 20,000 homes without gas service in cold weather. There were no injuries reported.
- February 9 – The "Little Big Inch" gas pipeline exploded, near Somerset, Ohio. There were no injuries.
- September 9 – Five square miles east of Boston, Massachusetts were evacuated from a pipeline leaking about 1,000,000 US gallons (3,800,000 L) of gasoline.
- September 10 – A gas explosion in Cleveland, Ohio killed one person and injured 50 others.
- October 18 – The 20 inch "Big Inch" gas transmission pipeline exploded near Uniontown, Pennsylvania, causing a massive fire that burned five acres of cornfields, and opened an 18 foot deep crater. There were no injuries reported.
- November 24 – A US Air Force T-33 trainer jet crashed into a natural gas pipeline bridge over the Mississippi River near Greenville, Mississippi, rupturing and igniting the pipeline.

=== 1954 ===
- January 17 – A Panhandle Eastern gas transmission pipeline exploded in Lucas County, Ohio, causing some nearby residents to evacuate and a crater 60 feet long, 10 feet deep, and 8 feet wide. Two other explosions had occurred on this pipeline in the previous two years in Lucas County, but a Panhandle Eastern representative said the three explosions were just a coincidence.
- April 12 – A 40-to-50-year-old LP gas distribution line was blamed for causing an explosion in Goldsboro, North Carolina that killed five people, injured 15 others, and demolished three buildings.

=== 1955 ===
- February 15 – A 20-inch Cities Service pipeline exploded south of Lawrence, Kansas, ejecting a 20-foot section of pipeline. There was no fire or injuries.
- March 7 – The "Big Inch" gas pipeline exploded and burned near Roseville, Ohio. Flames reached 400 feet (120 m) high, and 8 acres (32,000 m^{2}) of brush and timber burned.
- March 9 – A pipeline construction crew of four were killed while trying to move a pipeline for the building of a toll road in Chesterton, Indiana. Two other pipeline workers were injured, and a school a quarter mile away was evacuated.
- A burst pipeline at a refinery in Sunburst, Montana contaminated groundwater and soil in the area. Despite pumping out over 182,000 US gallons (690,000 L) of gasoline, pollution from the accident remained. In 2004, local residents and a school district won a lawsuit for payment of damages.
- A bulldozer ruptured and ignited a gas pipeline in Brookshire, Texas. Flames reached 250 feet (76 m), and the bulldozer operator was killed.
- August 10 – A gas leak in Ashtabula, Ohio was ignited by electrical equipment or lightning, causing a restaurant to explode. 21 people were killed, 15 more were injured, and six buildings were destroyed.
- September 7 – A gas pipeline being tested in Detroit, Michigan exploded and burned, injuring one person, and destroying 50 cars.
- October 10 – A crew cleaning the outside of a natural gas pipeline with a heavy rubber ball ruptured a coupler, causing an explosion and fire east of Orleans, Indiana. Two members of the crew were killed, and three others were injured.
- November 30 – A drag-line operation in a gravel pit in Irving, Texas ruptured an 8-inch diameter gasoline pipeline. Gasoline spread out over about 10 acres (40,000 m^{2}), then exploded and burned. One home was destroyed, but the family living there was away at the time of the explosion.

=== 1956 ===
- February 11 – A corroded gas line from a gas main leaked, causing an explosion that killed three people at a meat packing plant in Toledo, Ohio.
- February 27 – A trench-digging machine being used in building a freeway cut into a gasoline pipeline in West Los Angeles, California. At least three people were burned, with nine homes, a warehouse, and a laundry catching on fire.
- April 26 – A new 26-inch gas transmission line was being pressure-tested near Moab, Utah when the gas exploded, then burned, causing damage to a utility pole, and damaging a half-mile of the pipeline. Mines in the region were shut down due to the lack of power. There were no injuries.
- October 16 – A butane pipeline ruptured, forcing 25 families to evacuate from flammable fumes near Greenwich, Ohio. Trains were also stopped in the area, until the fumes dissipated. There were no injuries.

=== 1957 ===
- January 16 – An explosion and fire occurred at a natural gas compressor station in Liberal, Kansas, killing three workers at that station. Eleven other workers were injured, and the fire burned for two hours. The shut-down of this gas pipeline from the explosion affected customers as far away as Ohio in sub-zero weather conditions.
- January 17 – Two explosions from a natural gas main killed three people in Peoria, Illinois. Seven others were injured, and a home and a two-story building were leveled.
- January 23 – The "Little Inch" gas transmission pipeline exploded and burned near York, Pennsylvania, causing flames that reached 200 feet high. There were no injuries.
- February 6 – A leaking gas main in Reno, Nevada led to three explosions. Two people were killed, 42 others injured, and five buildings were destroyed.
- June 3 – A 26-inch natural gas transmission pipeline exploded and burned near Ellinwood, Kansas, destroying a farm house. One person was injured.
- August 6 – 6 workers were injured in a fire and explosion, at a compressor station of the "Big Inch" gas pipeline near New Lexington, Ohio. Welding was being done at the time.
- October 18 – A 16-inch gas transmission pipeline burst 30 miles from Spokane, Washington, shutting down gas delivery to the Spokane area. A family near the rupture had to take cover.
- December 5 – A gas line in the basement of a store that was being worked on in Villa Rica, Georgia, exploded. Thirteen people were killed in the explosion and ensuing fire. At least six stores were destroyed.

=== 1958 ===
- February 17 – A natural gas metering station in Kimberly, Idaho exploded, killing two pipeline company workers, injuring another worker, and destroying the metering building. There was no fire.
- June 1 – Gas leaking from a pipeline near Big Spring, Texas was ignited and exploded, killing three fishermen and seriously burning another.
- June 12 – A 12-inch gas pipeline exploded and burned, near Lucinda, Pennsylvania. Fire spread to nearby vegetation. There were no injuries.
- June 22 – The "Little Big Inch" gas pipeline exploded, near Davidsburg, Pennsylvania. Hydrostatic pressure testing was done on the pipeline afterwards, due to it being the fourth explosion on that pipeline in that area in the past 6 years.There was no injuries.
- September 16 – A truck missed a curve on a road and crashed into a gas transmission pipeline compressor station near Kings Mountain, North Carolina. There was an explosion and fire, and the two men in the truck were killed.
- October 4 – A gasoline pipeline was ruptured by a bulldozer in Hobbs, New Mexico. The gasoline ignited, injuring three people, damaging six homes, and threatening a number of other homes for a time.
- November 9 – A jet fuel pipeline ruptured near the Blue Creek in Idaho. Fuel flowed down the creek, and later ignited, damaging one home and destroying six bridges. Several people fell sick from the fumes.
- December 14 – A leaking and burning gas line under a street led to several explosions at a hotel in Allentown, Pennsylvania. Seven people were killed and 23 others injured.

=== 1959 ===
- April 29 – A 20-inch pipeline owned by Laurel Pipeline ruptured, near Hollidaysburg, Pennsylvania, spilling thousands of gallons of gasoline onto fields and into streams. Earthen dams were built to reduce the amount of gasoline spilling into fishing streams. The pipeline had been recently built.
- May 22 – A Buckeye Partners oil pipeline ruptured in Sylvania, Ohio, spouting up in the lawn of a homeowner.
- September 25 – A worker on a gas transmission pipeline was closing a valve, when it exploded near Newton Township, Pennsylvania. The worker was killed, and another worker was injured.
- October 8 – A 10-inch propane pipeline burst in Austin, Texas. 400 families had to be evacuated, due to the explosion and fire hazard. Eventually, the fumes dissipated without incident. The rupture was caused by a weak section of pipe.
- November 1 – A Plantation Pipeline line ruptured in Concord, Tennessee burst, contaminating farm land and a pond with gasoline. There was no fire.

== 1960s ==
=== 1960 ===
- January 16 – A 30 inch gas transmission pipeline exploded & burned, near Elmwood, Nebraska. Flames threatened a nearby farm for a time. There were no injuries.
- Transwestern Pipeline Co.'s gas line 58 miles northwest of Roswell N.M. suffered an 8.1-mile brittle fracture, during testing of the 30-inch X56 pipeline. It failed at about 850 psi.
- An estimated 125,000 persons in southwest Missouri were without gas in subfreezing temperatures for several days due to a ditch-digging machine rupturing a pipeline.
- March 19 – On Saturday, a leaking 1 1/2 inch gas line led to gas migrating through a sewer line, from a church into a school, in Wauseon, Ohio. The gas later exploded, damaging the school and injuring six. Classes were not in session at that time.
- July – Excavation work in Merrill, Wisconsin caused a gas leak and gas explosion that killed ten people.
- October 5 – A ditching machine used in laying a water main hit an 8-inch natural gas pipeline in Sarasota, Florida. Nine people were injured in the ensuing explosion and fire.
- October 26 – A 16-inch gas transmission pipeline near Checotah, Oklahoma exploded while it was being worked on, to repair a leak. Three of the repair crew died, and three others were injured.
- December 12 – A leaking 8-inch pipeline at a tanker dock in Richmond, California spilled gasoline into the San Francisco Bay.
- December 19 – A 30-inch gas transmission pipeline exploded and burned at a gas sub-station in Huntington, West Virginia. Windows were broken, one home was damaged, and brush burned, but there were no injuries.

=== 1961 ===
- January 4 – A gas pipeline failure near Waynesburg, Pennsylvania ignited, causing a fire that was widely seen in the area. There were no injuries.
- February 22 – A pipeline exploded and burned in a refinery in Borger, Texas, killing nine members of a construction crew, and burning another crewman.
- February 23 – The main City of Miami, Florida Garage was destroyed by a gas explosion. The blast was caused by a ditch-digging machine being used in the garage hitting and rupturing a 2-inch gas pipe. One person was seriously burned by the blast, and two fire-fighters were injured fighting the fire that followed the blast.
- May 29 – A 20 inch natural gas pipeline exploded and burned, in North Saint Louis County, Missouri. Two people 300 feet from the blast suffered burns.
- June 18 – A Transcontinental Pipeline 36-inch gas transmission pipeline exploded near Laurel, Mississippi. Ten people were injured, and one home was destroyed by flames that went hundreds of feet in the air. A crater 30 feet (9.1 m) long and 20 feet (6.1 m) deep was created by the failure.
- August 12 – A bulldozer hit a gasoline pipeline, near Rochelle, Illinois. An estimated 50,000 gallons of gasoline was spilled, but there was no fire or injuries.
- September 10 – A 26-inch gas transmission pipeline exploded and burned near Trapp, Kentucky. 22 people suffered various burn injuries.
- October 9 – Vapors from a leaking pipeline on an oil storage tank exploded and burned in Bridgeport, Illinois. Four oil company workers were killed, and three others injured.
- October 21 – Two workers bleeding a gas pipeline, in Santa Clarita, California, were injured when gas vapors were ignited, and, one of them later died from the injuries.
- November 19 – A gas pipeline exploded and burned near Warrenton, Virginia. The blast created a crater 40 feet (12 m) long, 10 feet (3.0 m) wide, and 6 feet (1.8 m) deep. There were no injuries.
- November 25 – An 18-inch natural gas pipeline exploded and burned near Cadiz, Ohio. There were no injuries or damage.
- December 8 – A pipeline company was burned, near Bloomfield, New Mexico, when a pipeline carrying gasoline failed while he was closing a valve.

=== 1962 ===
- January 29 – A crew installing a pipeline hit a nearby Dow Chemical Company ethylene pipeline with a bulldozer, causing an explosion and fire, near Brazoria, Texas. One of the crew was killed, and six others were burned.
- February 20 – Gas leaking from a 10-inch natural gas transmission pipeline exploded in Portage, Ohio, injuring six people and destroying a home.
- April 24 – An earth mover hit a 10-inch Buckeye Partners pipeline in Sylvania, Ohio, causing a geyser of naphtha, which flowed into the Ten Mile Creek. Nearby schools were impacted.
- June 14 – A backhoe ruptured a gas transmission pipeline near Idaho Falls, Idaho. The escaping gas exploded and ignited later on while a crew was trying to repair the line. One of the crew was killed, and five others injured in the fire.
- July 20 - A utility crew using a hole digger hit an oil pipeline, in Cleveland, Ohio, causing a fire that burned 2 workers.
- August 2 – A natural gas transmission pipeline exploded and burned in Clearwater, Florida, next to US Highway 19, forcing that road's closure for a time. There were no injuries reported. Investigators found the cause of the failure was previous mechanical damage to the line.
- August 3 – A 30-inch gas transmission failed on August 3 in Kansas City, Missouri. The gas flowed for ten minutes before exploding and igniting. An 8-inch gas distribution pipeline was also ruptured, eleven homes were destroyed, and 23 others were damaged. At least one person was injured.
- September 11 – An 8-inch propane/LPG pipeline was ruptured by road building equipment in Greene County, Georgia. One of the road workers was overcome and frozen by the propane fumes. Propane fumes followed the Oconee River for 10 miles (16 km) into Lake Sinclair.
- October 17 – A gas main in Kansas City, Missouri exploded and burned, with flames 100 feet high, causing serious damage to one home, and minor damage to others. There were no injuries.

=== 1963 ===
- January 2 – A gas transmission pipeline ruptured, due to a defective weld, in San Francisco, California. The gas ignited, one firefighter died from a heart attack, and nine other firefighters were injured fighting the resulting inferno.
- January 10 – A pipeline spilled gasoline across US 27 in Coldwater, Michigan. There were no injuries or ignition.
- January 26 – A leaking gas main led to an explosion in three homes that killed a man and injured several more in Bethlehem, Pennsylvania.
- March 12 – An explosion and fire spread through a gas pipeline compressor station in Montezuma, Indiana, injuring 16 workers.
- April 3 – A bulldozer cut through a propane pipeline, in Tylertown, Mississippi. Propane fumes spread over a 10 square mile area, with some residents voluntarily evacuating. There was no injuries, fire, or explosion.
- September 10 – Lightning hit a pressure regulator assembly on a gas transmission pipeline, near Harrisonville, Missouri. A fire followed that. There were no injuries reported.
- September 18 – Crews installing a 12-inch pipeline hit an 8-inch Buckeye Partners pipeline in Monroe, Michigan, releasing some petroleum product. Traffic in that area was snarled, and several homes nearby were voluntarily evacuated.
- October 30 – A crude oil pipeline was hit and ruptured by an earth mover near Fostoria, Ohio, on October 30. The earth mover operator was seriously burned in the resulting fire.
- October 31 – A 6-inch butane pipeline was ruptured by an earth mover near West Millgrove, Ohio. The equipment operator was critically burned by the following explosion and fire.
- November 6 - A road grader hit an oil pipeline, in Tyler, Texas. Escaping oil ignited, causing 3 homes to burn down. There were no injuries reported. It was reported that the pipeline was buried only 3 inches under the road.
- November 17 – Flammable liquids leaking from a pipeline disposal pit were accidentally ignited, killing a teen planning to cook alongside a creek in South Carolina.
- December – A break occurred in a high-pressure steel petroleum pipeline, crossing the Chattahoochee River, about 5 miles above the intake for the Atlanta, Georgia, water supply. Before the petroleum main could be shut down, some 60,000 gal of kerosene had spilled into the contiguous swampy area and flowed into the river water, forcing extra treatment by the water Department.
- December 9 - A 10 inch gasoline pipeline leaked, near Trainer, Pennsylvania, forcing evacuations.
- December 25 – A fire broke out at a crude oil pipeline storage tank, at a terminal, in Lima, Ohio. Nearby residents were evacuated for a time, but, there were no injuries.

=== 1964 ===
- February 4 – A Santa Fe Railroad Freight Train apparently ignited fumes, from a leaking propane pipeline, near Bosworth, Missouri. The explosion and fire ignited four diesel locomotives and some box cars, and derailed other box cars. One member of the rail crew was injured.
- February 7 – Two workers installing insulation on a valve in a manhole in Richardson, Texas were overcome by gas and killed when an 8-inch pipeline in the vault ruptured.
- February 28 – A front loader ruptured a gas pipeline in Fort Worth, Texas, seriously burning the loader operator.
- May 12 – A bulldozer hit and broke a valve on an LPG pipeline near Demopolis, Alabama while grading land. The resulting fire caused fears of flames spreading to an underground storage facility, but the fire was later controlled. There were no injuries.
- July 29 - Crews repairing a leaking liquid fuel pipeline near Arkansas City, Kansas accidentally ignited residual fuel in the area, causing a fire that burned 3 of the crew.
- August 22 – Crews working on an extension of Plantation Pipeline in Ferry Farm, Virginia hit a natural gas pipeline. Gas escaped for over three hours before it was shut off.
- September 1 – A 24-inch natural gas transmission pipeline being worked on exploded near Pratt, Kansas, burning nine of the crew.
- October 29 – A crude oil pipeline ruptured in Gilbertown, Alabama on October 29. More than 72,000 US gallons (270,000 L) of oil were spilled.
- November 18 – A gas line being moved in Miami, Florida exploded and burned on November 18. Four people were injured.
- November 25 – A recently replace natural gas transmission pipeline exploded and burned in Saint Francisville, Louisiana, killing five workers on the pipeline, and injuring at least 23 others.
- December 25 – A 12 inch butane pipeline exploded and burned, near El Dorado, Kansas. A fuel tank nearby was destroyed, but there were no injuries.

=== 1965 ===
- January 6 – A house in Garnett, Kansas was destroyed by an explosion, and later on gas was found leaking from a 2-inch gas line in the street front of it, and was thought to be the cause. A young boy was killed. The same leak may have caused another nearby house explosion the previous November.
- January 21 – An 8-inch Buckeye Partners pipeline propane transmission pipeline 15 miles (24 km) east of Jefferson City, Missouri leaked. The propane spread along the ground, and exploded several hours later, scorching an area over a mile wide. A girl being dropped off at a school bus stop was severely burned and later died, as well as her father, and one other person were burned.
- March 4 – A 32-inch gas transmission pipeline, north of Natchitoches, Louisiana, belonging to the Tennessee Gas Pipeline exploded and burned from stress corrosion cracking (SCC), killing 17 people. At least nine others were injured, and seven homes 450 feet from the rupture were destroyed. This accident, and others of the era, led then-President Lyndon B. Johnson to call for the formation of a national pipeline safety agency in 1967. The same pipeline had also had an explosion on May 9, 1955, just 930 feet (280 m) from the 1965 failure.
- April 3 – A crude oil pipeline ruptured east of Blanding, Utah, spilling about 5,000 barrels (790 m^{3}) of crude oil into the San Juan River. The ruptured pipeline was reported to flow "wide open" for over an hour.
- April 28 – A butane pipeline ruptured in Conroe, Texas, forcing residents in an eight-block area to evacuate.
- July 24 – A natural gas pipeline exploded and burned when workers were welding a tie-in pipeline onto it near Tescott, Kansas. One of the workers died, and 15 others were injured.
- August 21 – A 9-year-old girl was killed and eight people were injured in a Buckeye Partners pipeline explosion in western Van Wert County, Ohio. The explosion threw up flames that could be seen from 40 miles (64 km) away and scorched a 100-acre (0.40 km^{2}) area of farmland. A home about 800 yards away was shifted off of its foundation, and half a mile of railroad ties were set on fire. The girl killed was in her bed in a house 300 yards from the blast site. The rest of her family were injured. Investigators said the explosion was caused by gas leaking from an 8-inch pipeline, and was apparently ignited by a spark from a passing train.
- August 22 – Three workers were seriously injured while working on the Magnolia pipeline, in Abilene, Texas.
- August 23 – An 8-inch diameter Buckeye Partners gasoline pipeline ruptured in Sylvania, Ohio. The danger of fire or explosion forced evacuations of residents in a 2-square-mile (5.2 km^{2}) area. There was no fire.
- August 23 - A man received burns, when an oil pipeline caught fire, near Odessa, Texas.
- August 27 - An 18 inch crude oil pipeline leaked, near Albany, Maine, spilling about 6,300 gallons of crude oil.
- September 10 - A Sun Pipeline Co. line leaked gasoline in Birdsboro, Pennsylvania, killing fish in a creek.
- October 25 – A ruptured Buckeye Partners pipeline spilled naphtha in Mount Cory, Ohio, forcing evacuations until the naphtha evaporated.
- November – Two workers cutting into a pipeline at a natural gas liquids storage facility in Mont Belvieu, Texas accidentally caused an explosion and fire, which killed both workers, forced 1,700 residents to evacuate, and caused petrochemical businesses in the area to shut down.
- November 25 - A tug boat hit an underwater pipeline, near Delacroix Island, Louisiana, causing a gas leak that ignited. The Captain of the tug was kill, and, 5 of the tug's crew were injured.
- A survey by the Federal Power Commission of 51 gas pipeline companies showed that between January 1, 1950, and June 30, 1965 gas transmission pipeline failures had killed 64 people and injured another 222. Of the fatalities, 35 were gas pipeline company workers or contractors, and 29 were members of the public.

=== 1966 ===
- January 10 – A new 36-inch gas transmission pipeline exploded and burned during cleaning operations, near Larose, Louisiana, killing seven pipeline workers, and burning three others.
- January 28 – A 6-inch natural gas pipeline ruptured in Norfolk, Nebraska, shutting off gas to 20,000 people in ten communities.
- January 31 – A propane pipeline ruptured, exploded, and burned at a terminal, near Belle, Missouri. Fuel tanks nearby were threatened for time. There were no injuries.
- March 28 – A 30 inch gas transmission pipeline owned by El Paso Natural Gas blew out and ignited, near Grants, New Mexico. The resulting fire destroyed 900 yards of railroad track. There were no injuries.
- April 23 - Fumes from a leaking crude oil pipeline were ignited by a bonfire built by a pipeline repair crew, killing 4 workers and injuring 2 others, near Ajax, Louisiana. The bonfire was only 30 feet from the leak.
- June 5 – A crew working to install a sewer near Oklahoma City, Oklahoma ruptured a gas pipeline. One member of the crew was killed, and, 7 others injured.
- July 1 – A break in an 8-inch Buckeye Partners pipeline Co. line spilled thousands of gallons of crude oil into a field and the sewer system of Findlay, Ohio.
- December 14 – A leaking propane pipeline near Swedeborg, Missouri made a car stall. Others came to the aid of the stalled car, and someone lit a cigarette, igniting the fumes. Eight people were burned and hospitalized.

=== 1967 ===
- January 10 – A Shell Oil Company 6-inch propane pipeline exploded and burned while it was being worked on, in Meeker, Oklahoma. Two workers were killed.
- January 13 – A leaking gas main in the Jamaica section of New York City, New York caught fire on January 13. Two pieces of FDNY equipment responding to the gas leak report were burned, as well as numerous buildings. The fire spread to 13 alarm size, with 63 fire companies being used to control the situation. Seventeen homes were destroyed. The cause of the leak was the failure of a moisture scrubbing "drip pot" on the pipeline.
- February 13 - An 8 inch pipeline carrying heating oil leaked into a creek, near Wilmington, Delaware. About 4,000 to 5,000 gallons of heating oil was leaked.
- Manufacturers Light and Heat Company announced they were asking the Federal Power Commission for permission to allow a new pipeline to replace 73.5 miles of older pipeline, which was having 200 to 450 leaks a year in Eastern Pennsylvania.
- May 16 – A pile driver ruptured a propane pipeline in Dearborn, Michigan. The escaping gas caught fire, with two construction workers being killed, and four others seriously burned.
- June 30 – A leaking pipeline released 30,000 barrels (4,800 m^{3}) of JP-4 grade jet fuel in Wilmington, California. There was no fire.
- July 11 - A Standard Oil Company 12 inch gasoline pipeline ruptured & ignited, in Antioch, California, destroying 2 homes & damaging nearby railroad tracks. There were 2 minor injuries.
- July 26 – A bulldozer hit a gas pipeline, south of Childress, Texas, causing a large gas fire. The bulldozer operator was slightly injured. The fire burned for four days.
- August 5 – A leaking gas main forced five homes to be evacuated in Queens, New York.
- August 10 – A gas main that had been capped the day before leaked natural gas into a concession stand in Bamberg, South Carolina. An explosion of the gas was likely caused by an electrical spark, but the 6:40 am time likely prevented any injuries.
- September 25 – A road construction machine ruptured an 18-inch Plantation Pipeline in Akron, Alabama, spilling more than 5,000 gallons of gasoline. The gasoline had to be burned off to eliminate it.
- December 2 - An oil pipeline ruptured, then ignited, spray a repair crew of 5 with burning oil, near Maljamar, New Mexico. Three of the crew died died of their burn, with 2 being injured.

=== 1968 ===
- January 8 – At night, a City Water crew in Reading, Pennsylvania snagged a 3/4 inch gas line, causing it to pull out of a gas main fourteen feet away. About two hours later, there was an explosion that destroyed two nearby semi-detached homes, killing nine people in those structures.
- January 27 – A petroleum products pipeline was found to be leaking near Kokomo, Mississippi. Damage to cotton crops and water wells was discovered soon after.
- January 30 – A 4 inch gas main that was leaking triggered an explosion that killed 7, injured 17, and destroyed nearby building, in Pittsburgh, Pennsylvania. Gas company workers had been removing sidewalk to find the leak before the explosion.
- March 15 – A 30-inch high-pressure transmission line, near Edna, Texas, ruptured and caught fire. There were no casualties, but there was some property damage.
- April 6 – Richmond, Indiana explosion: Natural gas leaking from a pipeline in Richmond, Indiana built up in a sporting goods store and exploded. Gunpowder in that store exploded later on. 42 people were killed, 150 were injured, and fifteen buildings were destroyed.
- April 15 – A gasoline odor was detected at a drinking fountain in Glendale, California. The water well that fed the fountain was determined to be contaminated from an 8-inch pipeline that was leaking. Between 100,000 and 250,000 US gallons (950,000 L) of gasoline leaked into the local groundwater.
- May 4 – A propane pipeline ruptured & burned under the Mississippi River near Donaldsonville, Louisiana. 100 people were evacuated from nearby homes, but there were no injuries.
- May 8 – A residence in San Jose, California, experienced a gas leak, followed by an explosion. Four houses were demolished, and over 20 others damaged. Several persons were injured. Damage to property was estimated at $1 million.
- May 29 – A bulldozer ruptured a 1-inch gas service line at a children's nursery in Hapeville, Georgia. The bulldozer operator was unable to find the shutoff valve for the gas line, and shortly after there was an explosion and fire. Seven children and two adults were killed, and three children were seriously injured in the accident.
- June 1 – An 8-inch propane pipeline ruptured in a landslide near Plainfield, Ohio. Four different vehicles later drove into the vapor cloud, causing them to stall. One of the vehicle drivers tried to restart their vehicle, igniting the vapor cloud. Two people were killed, three others were injured by burns, and seven buildings and seven vehicles were destroyed.
- July 26 – A worker was burned by a natural gas fire while working on a Sunoco gas pipeline in Gettysburg, Pennsylvania.
- August 7 – A contractor laying a new pipeline broke an old pipeline in Norwalk, Ohio, spilling gasoline for four hours into the Huron River.
- August 22 – A 16-inch gasoline pipeline ruptured at General Mitchell Field, spilling almost 200,000 US gallons (760,000 L) of gasoline, and forcing closure of one runway. Previous damage to the pipeline by heavy equipment working in the area was identified as the cause of the rupture.
- September 3 – A coal company digging machine hit an 8-inch LPG pipeline in Fulton County, Illinois, killing one person and injuring four others.
- November 3 – Two teenage boys shooting a rifle ignited gasoline leaking from a petroleum pipeline pumping station, near Midland, Pennsylvania. A large brush fire ensued. Both boys had moderate burns. A stuck relief valve on the pipeline was the cause of the leakage.
- December 5
  - A MAPCO LPG pipeline, near Yutan, Nebraska ruptured on December 5. Repair crews responded to the pipeline rupture, and thought LPG vapors were dispersed, but ignited the vapor cloud by driving into it. Five repairmen were killed. After the accident, the Nebraska State Fire Marshal ordered MAPCO to reduce its operating pressure, and to hydrostatic retest 52 miles (84 km) of that pipeline. During the tests, 195 longitudinal seams failed.
  - A pipeline worker was hit by a temporary valve that blew off of a 30 inch gas pipeline, near Baldwin, Louisiana.
- December 18 – A 30-inch gas pipeline exploded and burned at a gas processing plant in Gibson, Louisiana. One plant worker was injured.
- December 28 – A crew was working an 8 inch gas pipeline to a 20 inch pipeline, near Bay City, Texas, when there was an explosion. Two persons of the crew were killed, and, four others injured.

=== 1969 ===
- January 3 – A gas explosion hit under a Manhattan borough street in New York City, New York, followed by a number of other gas explosions. 300 families were evacuated, and streets were cracked for four blocks. Difficulties of interconnected gas mains caused a seven-hour delay in shutting down the gas in the area.
- January 13 – A Buckeye Partners 22-inch crude oil pipeline ruptured in Lima, Ohio, spilling 1,000 to 2,000 barrels of oil on a street and into the sewer system. 8,500 people were evacuated. The crude caught fire, damaging the sewerage treatment plant. Cracks from welding were blamed for the failure.
- January 21 - A road maintenance worker was burned when the equipment he was using hit an oil pipeline, near McAllen, Texas.
- February 24 – A leaking crude oil pipeline caused a slick 35 miles (56 km) long in the Dry Creek near Greybull, Wyoming on February 24.
- March 17 – A 10-inch pipeline carrying aviation gasoline was ruptured by explosives on March 17 in Canyon, California The fuel caught fire shortly afterwards.
- April 18 – A gas explosion destroyed a home in Bowling Green, Kentucky, killing two children. Damage by a contractor to the gas lines and gas mains in the area was thought to be the cause.
- May 6 – A gas pipeline in Pittsburgh, Pennsylvania, that had been moved, was undergoing pressure testing when a cap on it blew off, hitting and rupturing another nearby gas pipeline. That pipeline exploded and burned, killing two workers, injuring eight other workers, and damaging three homes.
- May 7 - Road construction equipment ruptured a gas pipeline in Tampa, Florida, causing a fire. One firefighter died of a heart attack during the fire fight, and, another was injured.
- May 9 – An explosion & fire occurred at a pipeline gas compressor station, in Sunray, Texas. One worker was killed, and, 8 other workers were injured.
- June 3
  - A construction bulldozer hit a 30 inch gas transmission pipeline, near Moundsville, West Virginia. One person of the construction crew was killed.
  - The over-pressure of a low-pressure natural gas distribution system in Gary, Indiana caused numerous small fires and explosions. A gas company worker's errors allowed much higher than normal gas pressure in a gas distribution system. 56 square blocks were evacuated, seven people were injured, six homes destroyed, and 19 other homes damaged. Later, The National Transportation Safety Board called for upgraded gas pipeline safety standards.
- June 6 – A pressure release on a propane pipeline at a pump station near Barnesville, Georgia injured 3 workers. There was no fire or explosion.
- September 9 – A converted natural gas pipeline running at 789 psi near Houston, Texas ruptured, causing a massive fire. Construction work downstream of the accident led to a pressure build up that caused the rupture. Seven people were injured, thirteen homes were destroyed, and eleven other homes damaged. Some of the homes were within 25 feet of the pipeline. The closest valves on this pipeline took 90 minutes to close.
- September 22 – A tractor ripper bit ruptured a 24-inch natural gas transmission pipeline, in Seligman, Arizona, causing flames 300 feet high. 2 workers installing a coal slurry pipeline were killed, and, another seriously burned.
- September 23 – A bulldozer being used as part of high tension power line construction hit a gas transmission pipeline in Proctor, West Virginia. The gas exploded and burned, injuring six of the electrical line construction crew. Another bulldozer had hit a gas pipeline in the same area some months before, killing another worker.
- September 28 - A bulldozer being used for disposal hit a gas pipeline, near North Omaha, Nebraska. The bulldozer & 3 barns were destroyed.
- November 6 – A bulldozer partially collapsed the steel covers of a gas regulator pit, in Burlington, Iowa. This caused damaged to the regulator, caused a five-times pressure surge in the gas distribution system. The gas fire caused major damage to ten homes, and, minor damage to 42 homes.
- November 19 – Telephone company contractors installing an underground cable hit a 10-inch gas pipeline in Vandyne, Wisconsin. Gas at 750 psi escaped, and ignited about 45 minutes later, killing one of the contractors, and injuring three others.
- December 17 – A bulldozer at a rock quarry struck a propane pipeline, in Wetumpka, Alabama. The propane ignited, and burned into the next evening. There were no injuries.
- December 25 – A land leveler ruptured a 22-inch natural gas transmission pipeline, in Hermiston, Oregon. Gas at 600 psi sprayed from the pipeline. A warning sign about the existence of the gas pipeline was 10 feet (3.0 m) away from the rupture site.
