= Andrew Sacks =

American environmental lawyer

- Occupation: Lawyer
- Known for: Environmental litigation, $1.06B verdict against ExxonMobil
- Website: Sacks Law, LLC website

Andrew Sacks is an American environmental lawyer, who is the managing partner of the Philadelphia law firm Sacks Law, LLC. Best known for litigating against companies that damage the environment or injure people, Sacks successfully helped secure a $1.06 billion verdict against ExxonMobil in 2001. The company was found guilty of polluting land with radioactive material and the case is the largest private landowner contamination case in U.S. history.

== Lawsuits ==
=== ExxonMobil ===
Sacks was a participating attorney in the landmark verdict against ExxonMobil in 2001. A jury awarded his client $1.06 billion in damages for land polluted with radioactive material. The case is the largest private landowner contamination case in United States history.

=== Philip Morris ===
Sacks and legal partner John Weston were counsel in a case representing the EU and 25 member countries and the Departments and Central Government of Colombia in tobacco smuggling litigation resulting in $3 Billion in settlements.

=== Ashland Oil ===
Sacks was counsel in a case in which Ashland Oil paid $14 million to settle more than 5,000 third-party claims as well as damages, expenses, and cost of the settlement. The settlement included $11 million for cleanup, $5.25 million in legal and administrative fees to handle class-action suits, and $2.25 million in criminal fines paid for violations of the Federal Clean Water Act.
