= Index of Earth science articles =

Earth science (also known as geoscience, the geosciences or the Earth Sciences) is an all-embracing term for the sciences related to the planet Earth. It is arguably a special case in planetary science, the Earth being the only known life-bearing planet. There are both reductionist and holistic approaches to Earth science. There are four major disciplines in earth sciences, namely geography, geology, geophysics and geodesy. These major disciplines use physics, chemistry, biology, chronology and mathematics to build a quantitative understanding of the principal areas or spheres of the Earth system.

Articles related to Earth science include:

== A ==
- Antarctic Convergence
- Atmospheric chemistry
- Atmospheric physics
- Atmospheric sciences

== B ==
- Biosphere
- Biogeography

== C ==
- Cartography
- Chemical oceanography
- Climatology
- Crust
- Cryosphere
- Crystallography (mineralogy)

== D ==
- Dynamo theory

== E ==
- Earth's core
- Earth's magnetic field
- Earth's mantle
- Economic geology
- Edaphology (soil science)
- Engineering geology
- Environmental geology
- Environmental science
- Erosion
- Exosphere (Atmospheric sciences)

== G ==
- Gaia hypothesis
- Gemology (mineralogy)
- Geochemistry
- Geochronology (Geophysics)
- Geodesy (see Surveying)
- Geodynamics (Geophysics and Tectonics)
- Geographical Information System
- Geography
- Geoinformatics (GIS)
- Geology
- Geomagnetics (Geophysics)
- Geomicrobiology
- Geomorphology
- Geophysics
- Geosphere
- Geostatistics
- Glaciology (Geology and Hydrology)
- Gravimetry (Geophysics)

== H ==
- Historical geology
- Human geography
- Hydrogeology
- Hydrology
- Hydrometeorology
- Hydrosphere

== I ==
- Intertropical Convergence Zone

== L ==
- Limnology (Hydrology)
- Lithosphere (Geology)

== M ==
- Magma (Volcanology)
- Magnetosphere
- Marine biology (Oceanography)
- Marine geology (Oceanography)
- Meridional flow
- Mesosphere (Atmospheric sciences)
- Meteorology
- Micropaleontology
- Mineralogy

== O ==
- Oceanography

== P ==
- Paleoceanography
- Paleoclimatology
- Pedology (Soil science)
- Pedosphere (Soil science)
- Petrology (Geology)
- Physical geography
- Physical oceanography
- Planetary geology
- Plate tectonics

== Q ==
- Quaternary geology

== R ==
- Remote Sensing and GIS

== S ==
- Sedimentology (Geology)
- Seismology (Geophysics)
- Soil science
- Stratigraphy (Geology)
- Stratosphere (Atmospheric sciences)
- Structural geology
- Surveying (see Geodesy)

== T ==
- Thermosphere (Atmospheric sciences)
- Tropopause
- Troposphere (Atmospheric sciences)
- Tornadoes

== V ==
- Volcanology

== Z ==
- Zonal flow
