= P. B. Sahasranaman =

Indian lawyer

P.B.Sahasranaman
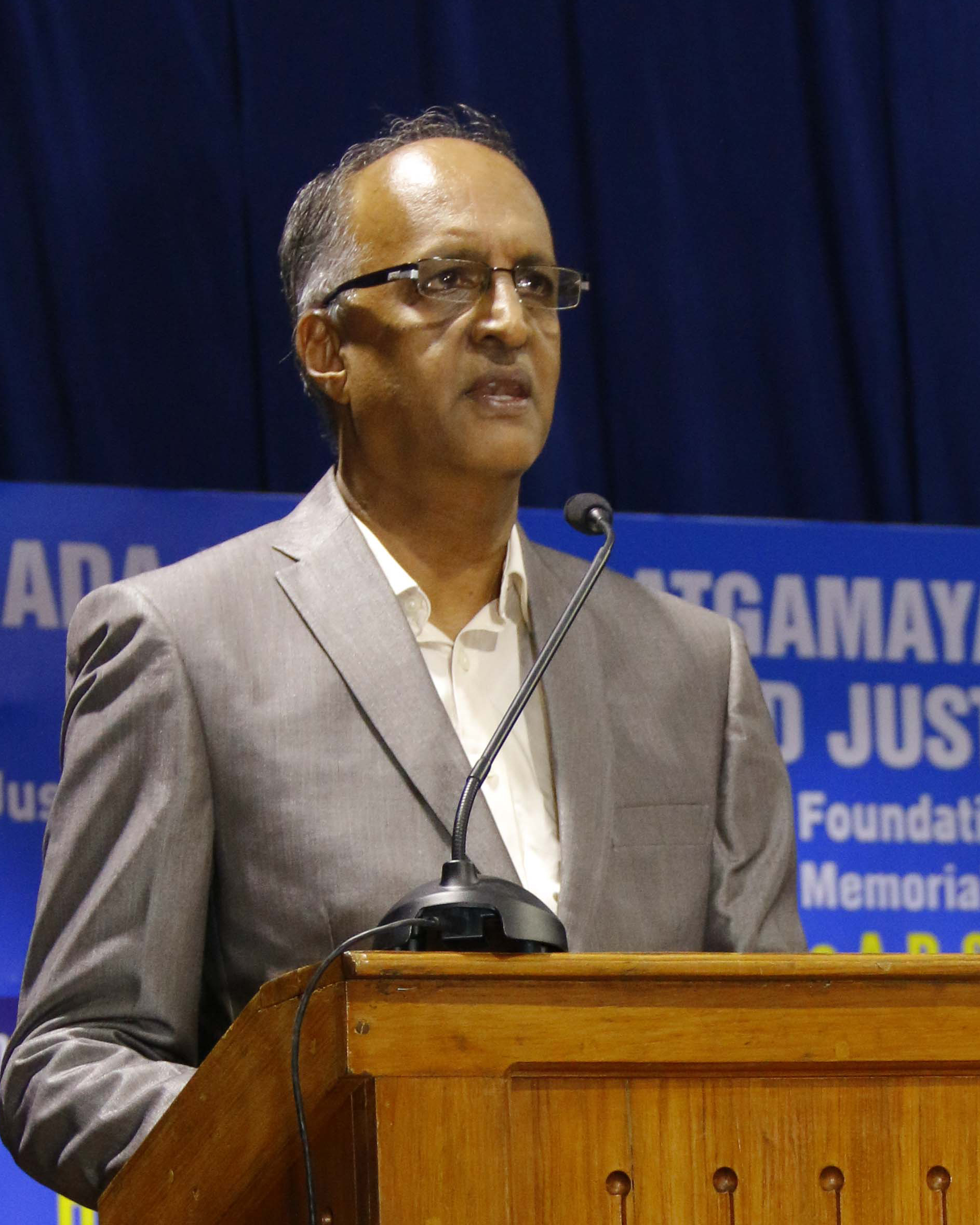
- Born: Ernakulam, India
- Education: St. Alberts High School, Ernakulam; Govt Law College, Ernakulam
- Occupation: Lawyer
- Spouse: P. R. Saraswathy
- Children: 2
- Awards: Bhoomi Mitra Award (2001)

Pallavoor Bharatharaj Sahasranaman also referred to as P.B.Sahasranaman, is an Indian lawyer, who specializes in environmental laws. He primarily practices at the Kerala High Court but also appears in the Supreme Court of India and the National Green Tribunal. He is also a popular author in Environment Law.

== Career ==
He began his career in 1984 soon after graduating from Govt Law College, Ernakulam. Adv. Sahasranaman was appointed as Amicus Curiae by the Kerala High Court in many cases relating to the preservation of the environment. He was the convenor of a team of advocates who were appointed to inspect the Social Forestry Project and Kerala Forestry Project of the Forest Department.

The report made it possible for the government to make legislation to protect the ecologically fragile lands of the state of Kerala. In 2006, he was appointed as "Advocate Commissioner" for mosquito menace in Kochi Corporation Chikungunya .His report on the establishment of web-based online monitoring system in Jail in Kerala was accepted and directions were issued by the High Court of Kerala for the same.

The writ petition filed through him enabled the setting up of a basic framework of rules regarding the right of apartment owners on common facilities and maintenance of apartments in Kerala. It brought into effect the right of owners to register their apartments individually tremendously enhancing the saleability of apartments.

He was a member of the Kerala Law Reforms Commission headed by Justice V. R. Krishna Iyer. He was also the Member of the Commission on Rights and Welfare of Women and Children headed by Justice V. R. Krishna Iyer. Currently, he is the present Vice President of the Sarada Krishna Satgamaya Foundation for Law and Justice (formerly known as Justice V. R. Krishna Iyer Foundation). He is also one of the Honorary Editors of CDJ Law Journal

He has presented papers at the World Bank Legal Forum, 2005, a session on Legal Empowerment and Justice for the Poor, A Focus on Environmental Justice, held in Washington, D.C., USA, on 1 and 2 December 2005. He regularly takes classes and workshops for lawyers, judges, and students in India.

== Bibliography ==
Adv. P.B.Sahasranaman has published various books and articles on environmental-related subjects. He blogs at LiveLaw.in. His latest book was “Green Book on Indian Environmental Law” was released on 4 June by Ravi Shankar Prasad, Union Minister for Law and Justice. Some of the other popular books include:

- Handbook on Environmental Law in India (2nd Edition-Revised) ISBN 978-0-19-807435-9
- Speaking for the Bench. Selected Judgement of Justice. V.R. Krishna Iyer (2012) ISBN 978-0-19-807435-9
- Surfeit of Tribute to India's Greatest Living Judge-Justice V.R. Krishna Iyer ISBN 978-93-5035-403-2
- "The Law Relating to Protection of Coastal Areas". India Bare Acts Books Online store.
- Environmental Law - A compilation of all the enactments on Environmental Laws of India
- "A Compendium of Kerala High Court Act and Rules". India Bare Acts Books Online store.
