= Timeline of the Central Plains Water Enhancement Scheme =

This is a timeline of the Central Plains Water Enhancement Scheme.

The Central Plains Water Enhancement Scheme is a proposed water diversion, damming and water reticulation and irrigation scheme for the Canterbury Plains of New Zealand.

1999 – Beginning

- 26 April – the Christchurch City Council adopts the 1999 Annual Plan. The plan budgeted $150,000 for a 'Feasibility Study for Central Plains Irrigation'.
- 13 September – Christchurch City Council approved setting up a joint steering committee with Selwyn District Council, to be called the 'Central Plains Irrigation Steering Committee'.

2000 – Steering committee

- 14 February – the terms of reference were approved by Christchurch City Council and Denis O'Rourke was appointed to the committee.
- 24 March – Doug Marsh, Jack Searle, John Donkers, Willie Palmer and Doug Catherwood were appointed to the committee.
- July – Doug Marsh is elected as chairman of the steering committee. The council staff supporting the committee are Walter Lewthwaite, Allan Watson, Bruce Henderson (Christchurch City Council) and Eddie Thomas (Selwyn District Council).
- 18 December – the steering committee engages URS New Zealand Limited, a subsidiary of URS Corp., to carry out the feasibility study.

2001 – Scoping studies

- 13 July – URS New Zealand Ltd are to carry out the third phase of the feasibility study for $NZ374,300 excluding GST.
- 6 December – URS New Zealand Ltd applied to Canterbury Regional Council on behalf of the two councils and the Ashburton Community Water Trust, for a resource consent to take water from the Waimakariri River and Rakaia River.

2002 – Consolidation

- 7 February – the URS feasibility study was released. In spite of noting: – the community opposition, – the lack of a strategy for obtaining land needed for dams and canals, – the environmental concerns (groundwater contamination from nitrates, degradation of river habitats, changes to lowland water tables), the feasibility study concluded that the project was feasible.
- 28 February – the Christchurch City Council adopts a compromise resolution after debating the feasibility study. The continued funding of Central Plains Water Enhancement Scheme was referred to the economic development unit of the council's Capital Endowment fund. No one with prior involvement was to be involved in the decision. A comprehensive report on the 'extent to which the scheme could be managed sustainably' was to be produced.
- 11 October – URS New Zealand Ltd release a geotechnical study that concluded that the Waianiwaniwa River valley, upstream of the village of Coalgate was a suitable site for an earth dam and reservoir with a volume of 290 million cubic metres of water.
- 21 November – the Christchurch City Council approves the use of a trust to hold the resource consents for the scheme.

2003 – CPW Trust

- 15 April – the Central Plains Water Trust is established.
- 12 May – the CPW Trust will set up a company to issue a prospectus to raise funds.
- 23 October – the 2001 resource consent application for Rakaia and Waimakariri River water is transferred to the Central Plains Water Trust.

2004 – CPW Ltd and share prospectus

- 16 September – Central Plains Water Limited issues a share prospectus to raise funds to pay for applications for resource consents.

2005 – Applications for resource consents

- 12 May – Central Plains Water Limited confirms GHD Limited as project manager, Buddle Findlay as legal adviser, URS New Zealand Limited as technical adviser and Deloittes as financial adviser.
- 23 November – the consent applications for the use of water for irrigation and associated land uses are lodged with Environment Canterbury.
- 24 November – Central Plains Water Limited is given requiring authority status by the Minister for the Environment, meaning it may apply to the Minister of Land Information to compulsorily acquire private land.

2006 and 2007 – Notification of applications

- 12 June – applications for resource consents for land use are lodged with Selwyn District Council.
- 24 June – public notification of 55 applications for resource consents lodged with Environment Canterbury.

2007

- 5 May – a further 10 resource consent applications for a ten kilometre tunnel are notified by Environment Canterbury.
- 5 July – the Christchurch City Council allows Central Plains Water Limited to borrow up to $4.8 million from Dairy Holdings Limited.
- 1 August – Central Plains Water Trust asks for the consent hearing to be deferred to February 2008.
- 13 August – the Christchurch medical officer of health, Alistair Humphrey, commented that the downstream social and health concerns of the scheme were being largely overlooked in the haste to promote the $350 million irrigation scheme.

2008 – Hearings

- 25 February – hearings for the scheme, which has had 1200 submissions, began in Christchurch.
- 25 September – the hearings finish.

2009 – Interim decision

- 3 April – Hearing Panel indicates they are unlikely to grant CPW the dam consents.
- 11 May – the hearing resumes to decide whether to consider granting water takes and water races.
- 20 May – hearing evidence from CPW will resume on 5 October 2009.

== See also ==
- Timeline of the New Zealand environment
