= List of pipeline accidents in the United States before 1900 =

The following is not a complete list of natural gas and petroleum product accidents before 1900, which run into the thousands. The oil and gas industry was as yet unregulated, so leaks and explosions were not tracked in an organized fashion except by city fire departments. Many natural gas accidents were not recorded unless they occurred in population centers with newspapers to report them.

In the twentieth century, the Pipeline and Hazardous Materials Safety Administration (PHMSA), a U.S. Department of Transportation agency, would be established to develop and enforce regulations for the safe and environmentally sound operation of the United States' pipelines, and to collect data on pipeline leaks, accidents, and explosions.

== 1860s ==
=== 1860 ===
- A manufacturer was marketing a portable or domestic gas works to produce gas from coal for a household beyond the reach of city gas lines. The “gasometer” was about six feet in diameter and five or six feet deep, and worked something like a cook stove. In March 1860, a "gasometer" exploded during a fire at New Orleans, Louisiana. Two men were burned to death, but the building was saved.

=== 1861 ===
- April 18 – In Tidioute, Pennsylvania, benzene escaping from a newly drilled oil well rose 50 feet in the air and was ignited by the engine of another well 400 rods away. In a second the air was aflame with a roar like artillery. “As soon as the gas took fire, the head of the jet of oil was in a furious blaze, and falling like water from a fountain over a space 100 feet in diameter; each drop came down a blazing globe of boiling oil. Instantly the ground was aflame.” The men and boys working on the site were set on fire; 15 died and 34 were injured. Another source says this occurred at Titusville, Warren County, Pennsylvania, and the drill pipe was 5½ inches in diameter.

=== 1862 ===
- April 17 – In Eaton, Ohio, a supposed vandal left in charge of the “gas-o-meter” set off an explosion that damaged a local business.

=== 1863 ===
- May 1 – Workmen remodeling a house in San Francisco, California accidentally broke a gas pipe. Not knowing where the meter was to turn off the gas, they plugged the open pipe with a piece of bottle cork, then held a candle close to see if the pipe was still leaking. It was. The resulting explosion burned a woman and three men, and shook the neighboring buildings, whose inhabitants thought they were having an earthquake.
- November 22 – A gas explosion took place in a building occupied by the U.S. provost marshal at New Orleans, Louisiana. Workmen refitting the gas fixtures had neglected to shut off the gas completely so as soon as a match was lighted, the gas exploded with a noise like an earthquake and did great damage to the building. No one was seriously injured.

=== 1866 ===
- January – In Covington, Kentucky, a fruit storage warehouse's gas line broke and the building filled with natural gas which exploded when a workman with a light in his hand entered the building. Property damage was estimated at $40,000.
- March 23 – In Cincinnati, Ohio, an opera house and newspaper office were destroyed by an explosion thought to have been caused by a leaking gas pipe that ignited. The resulting fire spread, destroying several other buildings and their contents, for a total loss of $2 million in property damage.
- April – A Baltimore, Maryland barber shop was destroyed and its occupants injured when a leaking gas pipe under the floor exploded, throwing them against the ceiling. An adjacent jewelry shop, cigar store and hotel were also damaged.

=== 1867 ===
- June 1 – In Washington, D.C., two men searching the Clarendon Hotel with a lantern, looking for a gas leak, found it when it exploded, shattering walls and injuring the engineers and two watermen.
- July 30 – In Gloucester, Massachusetts, three gas explosions occurred at a mansion house on the cove. By the time of the last explosion, at least 15 firemen and others had been badly burned; one died from his injuries.

=== 1868 ===
- 1868 – The Detroit Gas Company, suffering from a serious leak in their main pipe, and having discovered the probable locality, began digging down to the pipe, building a fire to thaw the ground. An explosion ensued, but the workmen were not seriously injured.
- December 5 – In Cleveland, Ohio, a gas explosion and subsequent fire destroyed a house and all its contents. The homeowner set it off when he carried a candle into a cellar where he noticed a faint smell of gas. All five family members escaped with minor burns.

=== 1869 ===
- May 19 – A gas explosion blew a Brooklyn, New York woman out of her house through a window and onto a shed, where she landed unhurt. A gasfitter working in her apartment had set off the blast when escaping gas reached his lighted lamp.
- May 27 – A large gas holder at the Cincinnati Gas Works holding 375,000 cubic feet of natural gas, exploded just after 20 workmen left the site. The explosion killed one painter still onsite, and broke glass nearly half a mile away. The cause was unknown.
- December 7 – In Philadelphia, Pennsylvania, while the Commercial Exchange Association building was being lit up in the evening, a large chandelier in the upper hallway fell, breaking the gas pipe that supplied it. The gas ignited and seconds later the building was on fire. The nearly new $250,000 building was gutted, but everyone escaped.

== 1870s ==
=== 1870 ===
- November – In San Francisco, California, the wealthy Chinese doctor Li-Po-Tai and another man suffered severe flash burns and scorched lungs when an unsecured gas jet filled a room with natural gas that ignited when a match was lit. The elegant home was damaged and a third man was injured when he fell down the stairs trying to escape.
- December 19 – In Cincinnati, Ohio, natural gas-holder number 5 exploded at the Cincinnati Gas Works, shaking the city. When it was destroyed, it was holding 450,000 cubic feet of gas valued at $75,000. The total loss was estimated at $100,000. There were no deaths in the explosion but one man was “slightly burned.” The gas-holder's predecessor was destroyed in similar fashion in May 1869.

=== 1871 ===
- February 6 – The Brooklyn, New York gasworks were destroyed by an explosion that blew up one of the large natural gas tanks, knocked its supports onto a neighboring tenement, and killed three employees. Property damage was estimated at $150,000.
- March – A fifteen-year-old boy playing on an unused gas-holder opened its hatch and threw in a match; the resulting explosion killed him and may have blown his companions into a nearby river.
- December 23 – A natural gas leak or an open stop-cock at the purifying house of the New York Metropolitan Gas Company's works ignited and exploded, destroying the building and smashing windows in a nearby tenement. Further destruction was prevented by a quick-thinking employee who immediately shut down the gas mains. Property damage of $30,000.
- December 26 – An oil well at Shrubgrass, Pennsylvania, caught fire from a gas explosion while drilling occurred, severely burning six men.

=== 1872 ===
- November 9 – Downtown Boston, Massachusetts burned after a gas explosion on Summer Street started a fire which strong winds whipped across the business district. Nearly every building was consumed in 70 acres of Boston. Hundreds of men, women, and children were displaced from their homes, rushing away from the advancing fire with nothing but what they could carry and the clothes on their backs. The following day, fires broke out again due to gas explosions where pipes continued to leak because the gas company had not shut down the gas supply to what remained of the downtown. The fire burned into a third day before it was brought under control. Casualties included firefighters and soldiers burned fighting the fire and a woman injured when she jumped out of a second-story window to escape the flames. Property damage was estimated at $100 million.

=== 1873 ===
- May 8 – In Brooklyn, New York, a careless plumber upgrading gas pipes in a residence left the gas leaking when he ended work for the day, and when it ignited, three children barely escaped the fire with their lives.

=== 1874 ===
- January 20 – A knitting mill in Bennington, Vermont caught fire from a leaking gasoline pipe and exploded. The blast lifted the roof and burst out the walls so that the roof fell back, crushing the operatives trapped below as the debris caught fire, killing nine women and injuring seven employees badly.

=== 1875 ===
- December 22 – The five-inch diameter gas main running under Federal Street and its bridge to South Boston exploded, tearing up the pavement for 175 feet. The street was thronged with people at the time and many were buried under the debris. Eyewitnesses reported a bright flash of light about midway across the causeway, followed by an explosion, with paving stones and gravel flying in all directions. Immediately thereafter the side of the causeway over the gas main collapsed into the river, carrying several people into the water. There were 16 known casualties and an unknown number of others missing; searchers were dragging the river for bodies. On December 29, investigators determined that the natural gas explosion in South Boston was caused by a careless gas company employee leaving a drip-cock of the gas main open, allowing gas to escape until something ignited it. On December 23, the death toll was estimated to be 5; one or two of the wounded had a doubtful prognosis.

=== 1876 ===
- December 25 – A plumber left gas pipes insecure after repairing a gas meter in the basement of the American Exchange Bank at the corner of Broadway and Cedar Street in New York. When the night watchman later opened the door, the gas exploded, damaging neighboring buildings as well as the bank. Several fires ensued but firefighters put them out before they could spread. The night watchman was hospitalized for his injuries.

=== 1877 ===
- August – The Brooklyn, New York fire marshal reported 35 fires in the city, two caused by gas explosions.

=== 1878 ===
- April 29 – In Detroit, Michigan, the explosion of a gas main leading into the Detroit Free Press building set the building on fire and routing all the employees at 5:40 a.m. The burning gas, ascending through the stairways, ignited every floor of two four-story brick buildings, which were gutted by the fire at a loss of $40,000.

=== 1879 ===
- October – Gas that had leaked into the playroom of Brooklyn, New York Public School #22 on Java Street exploded “opportunely” in the evening when no children were present. The janitor who set it off by lighting a match escaped unhurt.

== 1880s ==
=== 1880 ===
- November 29 – Three men were injured in New York City when a pipefitter inadvertently ignited gas leaking from a gas meter which exploded, throwing two of the men across the basement and knocking them senseless.

=== 1881 ===
- October 29 – In Philadelphia, Pennsylvania, the Baldwin Gas Manufactory exploded and caught fire, badly burning two men and injuring children playing in the street. The machinery was blown to bits and the roof thrown off the building. The Board of Supervisors had permitted the gasworks in the thickly settled neighborhood, asserting that the operation was “perfectly safe” despite unanimous protests by the Fire Commissioners, Fire Wardens, and Fire Marshal. After the explosion, property owners in the neighborhood met to petition for the gasworks permit to be rescinded.
- December 2 – In St. Louis, Missouri, the Laclede Gas Company blew up. “It was the usual story of an accumulation of gas, a lighted match, an explosion, and almost a conflagration” due to a leaking gas valve. The gas tester suffered flash burns, broken ribs and other injuries when he was blown out a second-floor window.

=== 1882 ===
- January 31 – In Newark, New Jersey, the Citizens’ Gas Company gasometer's 100,000 cubic feet of natural gas exploded. Due to the weight of snow and ice, the cover on the gasometer had tipped until the chains holding it in place snapped and struck a spark against the brick side of the tank. Property damage was estimated at $25,000 and part of Newark was left without gaslights.
- March 7 – A gas-house at Wilkes-Barre, Pennsylvania exploded as if it had been hit by artillery fire. Two-thirds of the large brick building was demolished despite having walls three feet thick. The gas there was made from “crude petroleum.”
- October 19 – In Philadelphia, Pennsylvania, a defective gas main exploded and blew an iron grating a hundred feet into the air. A series of explosions followed as the first explosion set off others in nearby mains and flames erupted from the sewers. No injuries were reported.

=== 1883 ===
- March 2 – In Eastport, Maine, a gas leak exploded due to the efforts of the men working to repair it. Unable to dig through the frozen soil to reach the pipe, the workers built a fire on the ground over the supposed location of the leak and went to dinner, leaving the fire to thaw the earth. They had just departed when a terrific blast blew up the main and the street itself for 20 feet. Dirt was thrown more than 200 feet.

=== 1884 ===
- New York had four fires caused by gas explosions.
- January 18 – A natural gas explosion destroyed a three-story building on Hanover Street in Boston, killing at least three residents and breaking every window within 300 yards.

=== 1885 ===
- January 31 – In Pittsburgh, Pennsylvania, a natural gas explosion killed five and injured at least 18; others were missing in the rubble of the 20 buildings wrecked. A week before the explosion, residents of the area had been threatening legal action against the Fuel Gas company due to the persistent leakage from the gas mains.
- February 21 – In Wellsburg, West Virginia, natural gas leaking from a gaslight system exploded. The shock wave was felt more than a mile away. Two buildings were “blown to atoms” and the resulting fire spread to two nearby dwellings. A family of five were killed instantly and several others were not expected to survive.

=== 1886 ===
- March 20 – An explosion of natural gas in Murrysville, Pennsylvania injured seven people, three fatally, and burned seven houses. The Charter Gas Company was connecting a pipeline from a new gas well to their main line; the increased pressure ruptured the main and the escaping gas filled nearby houses before the leak could be fixed. The gas ignited from the grate in one house and quickly spread to the others.

=== 1887 ===
- January 6 – A man was “burned to a crisp” as he slept when gas exploded at Youngstown, Ohio. Several others were reported missing. Four buildings including the new Baptist Church and the just completed $70,000 Andrews Block were destroyed by the ensuing fire.
- July – Two workers for Chartiers Natural Gas Company were suffocated by leaking natural gas in a ditch at Allegheny, Pennsylvania.

=== 1888 ===
- The United States had at least 63 fires caused by gas explosions.
- April 26 – In Chicago, Illinois, two men drilling a hole across a street to make a conduit for electrical wires accidentally punctured a gas main. Their next mistake was to light a candle to see what was wrong. In an instant, seventy-some clerks and customers from the store overhead were flying through the air and the building was on fire. The two workmen were badly injured, as were several clerks. The explosion did half a million dollars in property damage.
- July 14 – In Washington, Pennsylvania, five workers were seriously burned when gas unexpectedly began flowing through the pipes they were connecting. The natural gas ignited in a fireball that shot 75 feet into the air.

=== 1889 ===
- December 21 – In Asheville, North Carolina, the gasometer at the city gas works exploded. Of the four men making repairs inside of it, two were instantly killed and two wounded.
- In 1889 alone, New York had eight fires caused by gas explosions. In the previous six years there had been 28 gas explosions. Three destroyed clothing stores; seven destroyed dry goods stores.

== 1890s ==
=== 1890 ===
- January 24 – A gas explosion destroyed a home in Columbus, Ohio, attracting a crowd of onlookers. While people were still gathered to look at the ruins of the home, a second gas explosion happened in a nearby home. The second explosion caused 4 deaths, and there were 32 injuries from both explosions.
- A natural gas explosion at Greenville, Pennsylvania "blew out the front of a grocery store."

=== 1891 ===
- October 21 – Three people were seriously injured in Allegheny, Pennsylvania, when a carpet store was blown up by a natural gas explosion.

=== 1892 ===
- November 7 – Near Kokomo, Indiana, seven men were terribly burned, two of whom died, in a natural gas explosion that ignited while they were tapping a main on the Chicago pipeline.

=== 1893 ===
- January 4 – In Chicago, Illinois, a natural gas explosion wrecked a printshop and injured more than 20 firefighters and a number of laborers, some not expected to survive. Two firemen were fatally burned. An employee of the Natural Gas Company had repaired a leak that morning, but fire ignited in the afternoon and the first explosion threw all the employees to the floor. When firefighters arrived, another explosion occurred, flinging them across the room. A third explosion followed, injuring the rescuers. They had just been removed from the building when a fourth and more violent explosion erupted. Finally the gas company shut off the gas and the fire was controlled. Property damage was estimated at $20,000.
- January – A hotel in Anderson, Indiana was shaken by a terrific natural gas explosion which literally threw guests out of bed. The explosion was caused by a broken gas pipe in the street nearby; the escaping gas passed through the ground into the hotel basement, where it was ignited by a gas heater.

=== 1894 ===
- February 4 – A family was blown up in Indianapolis, Indiana when a house was demolished by a natural gas explosion. It is supposed that the gas accumulated in the cellar and seeping through the floor above, ignited at an open fireplace. A family with four children occupied the upper portion of the house: one dead and five fatally injured.

=== 1895 ===
- April 25 – A woman in Wilkinsburg, Pennsylvania was investigating the smell of gas in a basement, while using a portable lantern. A series of explosions then followed, injuring that woman, and another woman, and damaging 4 homes. The gas leak was caused by gas being diverted into an older, defective gas main in the area.
- April 29
  - In Edgewood, Pennsylvania, a suburb of Pittsburgh, a house was blown apart by an explosion of natural gas which leaked into the basement through a drain. One resident was killed and two others injured. The initial explosion was followed by two more which destroyed adjacent homes.
  - At the Elyria, Ohio, G.A.R. hall, a gaslight jet was opened without being lighted, and the building filled with gas overnight. When the janitor arrived in the morning and struck a match, the gas exploded, burning him seriously and almost demolishing the building.

=== 1896 ===
- March 6 – In Mannington, West Virginia, a gas well “broke loose” and caught fire, burning two men to death and six others seriously.

=== 1897 ===
- March 4 – Gas exploded in a subway excavation at the corner of Tremont and Boylston Streets in Boston, Massachusetts. In the excavation area were located gas pipes from eight inches to 24 inches in diameter, as well as electrical conduits which were thought to have sparked the explosion.
- May – Natural gas caused a fire that killed a watchman at a manufactory in Erie, Pennsylvania.
- September 3 – In San Antonio, Texas, a match struck to light a gaslight jet ignited an explosion in the county courthouse vault. The blast destroyed county papers, threw one man 20 feet out of the vault and knocked another unconscious.

=== 1898 ===
- March 28 – In Wheeling, West Virginia, a boy struck a match to light a lantern in a stable next door to the gas company's meter shed; the match ignited escaping gas that exploded.
- May 4 – In Paterson, New Jersey, part of a roller mill was blown up by an explosion in the boiler room and gas section, killing one and injuring three. Damage was estimated at $75,000.
- November 6 – A gas leak at the U.S. Capitol in Washington, D.C. destroyed the Supreme Court courtroom and rooms adjoining it. The force of the explosion distended the outer walls by two inches, left the rooms in ruins, and blew out all the windows. Fire immediately followed, fed by a broken four-inch gas main in the basement. Flames flew up the elevator shaft to the Supreme Court rooms and destroyed priceless records including 20,000 legal reference books and the justices’ archives before the fire was brought under control.

=== 1899 ===
- January 12 – In New York, two underground natural gas explosions during morning rush hour hurled steel manhole covers three feet square into the air, damaged a hotel and frightened passersby. The concussion broke windows 50 yards away. An electrician speculated that the explosion might have been caused by a blown fuse igniting a gas leak under the street.
- April 17 – In Denver, Colorado, fire broke out in the Denver Gas Company's works. Nine firemen were badly hurt by an explosion but none fatally.
