= Wirraminna Environmental Education Centre =

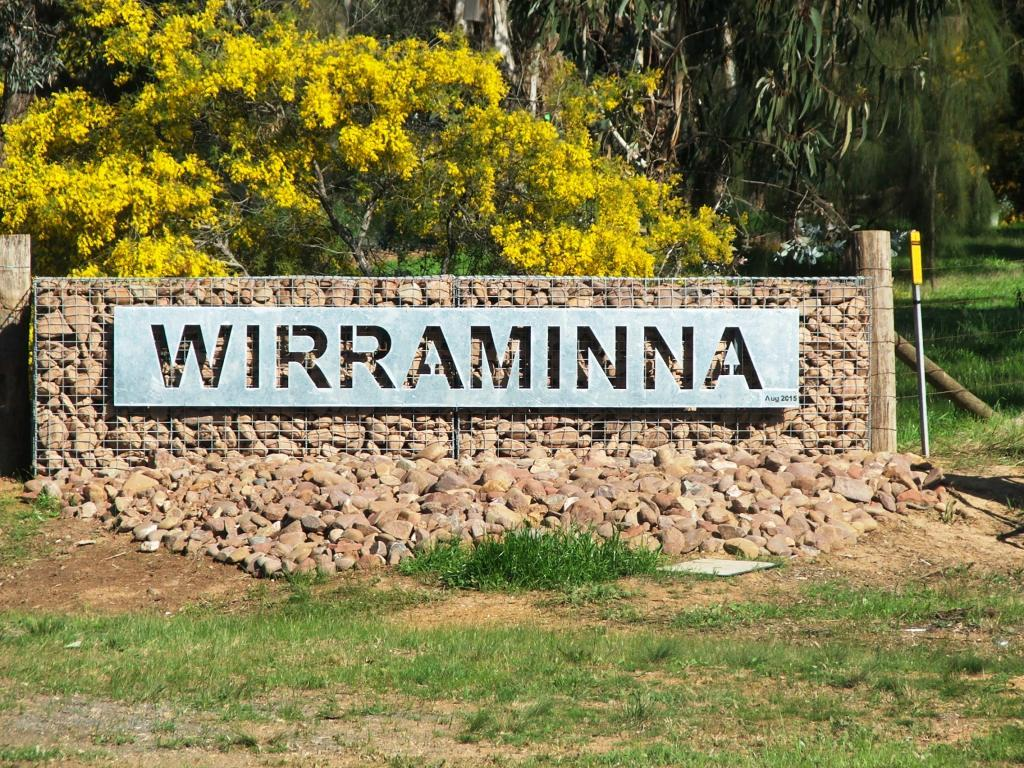
- Entry

Location
- Burrumbuttock, New South Wales; Australia
- Coordinates: 35°50′10.7″S 146°48′43.6″E

Information
- Established: 1995
- Website: https://www.wirraminna.org.au/

The Wirraminna Environmental Education Centre is a public park, botanic gardens and learning centre located in Burrumbuttock, NSW Australia in the Riverina region. Established in 1995 on an old stock reserve, it is maintained by volunteers.

In 2005, the Discovery Centre was built in Wirraminna for use by schools and community groups. The Discovery Centre has aquaria displaying native fish from the Murray-Darling Basin and Southern Corroboree frogs.

Over 2000 primary school children visit Wirraminna annually, from schools throughout the region.

== History ==
Wirraminna was originally known as public watering place 443 (20 February 1904) and declared a town water supply on 27 August 1937 controlled by Hume Shire Council. Through the cooperation of local residents and the principal of Burrumbuttock School, Wirraminna was established in 1995. In 2005 Wirraminna received financial support from the Australian Government’s Regional Partnerships program, which with matching local support enabled the construction of a rammed earth building named the Discovery Centre. Over 2000 primary school children visit Wirraminna annually, from schools throughout the region. It also provides a popular outing for clubs and organisations in the district, and many locals and visitors to the region call in to explore the gardens and learn about our local environment. Extensive interpretative signage around the park tells the environment story.

== Awards ==
Year	Award	Category	Notes
1999	NSW State Landcare Awards	Education	Awarded in conjunction with Burrumbuttock Public School
2015	NSW State Landcare Awards	NSW Junior Landcare Team Award	Create Catchment Kids program
2016	National Landcare Awards	Junior Landcare Team Award	Creative Catchment Kids program

== Creative Catchment Kids books ==
The Creative Catchment Kids program produces student written and illustrated books on different environmental themes.

Year	Theme	Link to Published Books	Notes
2011	An Aussie bush tale	https://www.envirostories.com.au/category/programs/aussie-bush/	
2012	Biodiversity of the Murray catchment	https://www.envirostories.com.au/category/programs/biodiversity-murray/	
2013	Catchment champions	https://www.envirostories.com.au/category/programs/catchment-champions/	
2014	Local land heroes	https://www.envirostories.com.au/category/programs/local-land-heroes/	
2015	Local land heroes	https://www.envirostories.com.au/category/programs/local-land-heroes/	
2016	Our culture, our community	https://www.envirostories.com.au/category/programs/our-culture/ https://www.envirostories.com.au/category/programs/our-community/	
2017	Our culture, our community Murray wetlands	https://www.envirostories.com.au/category/programs/our-culture/ https://www.envirostories.com.au/category/programs/our-community/ https://www.envirostories.com.au/category/programs/murray-wetlands/	
2018	Landcare	https://www.envirostories.com.au/category/programs/landcare/	
2019	Landcare	https://www.envirostories.com.au/category/programs/landcare/	

== Videos and Educational Materials ==
Year	Series	Links to Videos	Educational Materials
	Dr Dave in Box-Gum Grassy Woodlands	https://www.wirraminna.org.au/portfolio/dr-dave-in-box-gum-grassy-woodlands/	8 videos and fact sheets
	Dr Dave in the Murray Catchment	https://www.wirraminna.org.au/portfolio/dr-dave-in-the-murray-catchment/	4 videos and fact sheets
	Dr Dave in the Outback	https://www.wirraminna.org.au/portfolio/dr-dave-in-the-outback/	13 videos and fact sheets
	Corroboree Frogs	https://www.wirraminna.org.au/portfolio/corroboree-frogs/	Education kit
	Water in the Murray Region	https://www.wirraminna.org.au/portfolio/water-in-the-murray-region/	4 videos
	Cultural Heritage of Lake Victoria	https://www.wirraminna.org.au/portfolio/cultural-heritage-of-lake-victoria/	7 videos
	Indigenous Culture in the Upper Murray	https://www.wirraminna.org.au/portfolio/indigenous-culture-upper-murray/	12 videos
