= Burrumbuttock =

- Town
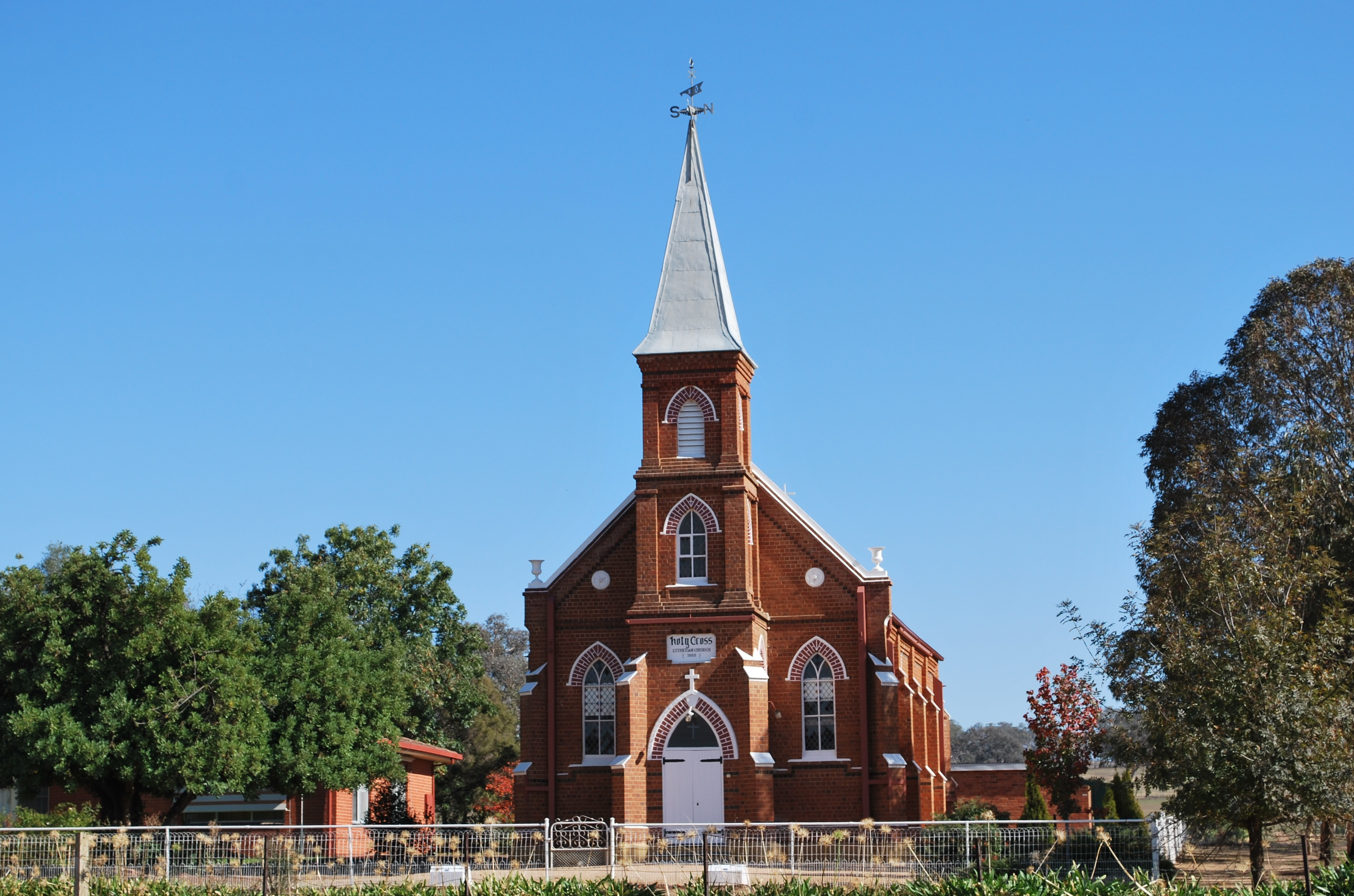
- Holy Cross Lutheran Church

- Coordinates: 35°49′S 146°47′E
- Country: Australia
- State: New South Wales
- LGA: Greater Hume Shire
- Location: 570 km (350 mi) from Sydney; 33 km (21 mi) from Albury; 19 km (12 mi) from Walbundrie; 15 km (9.3 mi) from Jindera

Government
  - State electorate: Albury
  - Federal division: Farrer
- Elevation: 246 m (807 ft)

Population
  - Total: 366 (2016)
- Postcode: 2642
- County: Hume

Burrumbuttock (/ˈbʌrəmbʌtək/ BURR-əm-but-ək) is a town in the central southern part of the Riverina region of the Australian state of New South Wales. The town is about 16 kilometres (10 mi) south east of Walbundrie and 34 kilometres (21 mi) north-west of Albury.

The town's name comes from the parish name and "T.P Gibson's estate".

== History ==
The town sits in an area that was termed Burrumbuttock station in 1839. The Crown Lands Alienation Act (Robertson Land Act) of 1861 saw the arrival of settlers to the region. By the 1870s, a large number of South Australian settlers of German origin came to Burrumbuttock. Burrumbuttock Post Office opened on 1 May 1883. A school, called Burrumbuttock East, was opened in 1889; the name was changed to Burrumbuttock Public School in 1929. The origin of the name "Burrumbuttock" is unclear, but believed to be of indigenous (probably Wiradjuri) in origin because the word "Burrum" usually refers to water. Locals claim that the name means "bullock's backbone", but there is no evidence for this name.

== Today ==
The town is known by its inhabitants as Burrum, with attractions ranging from a visit to the Wirraminna Environmental Education Centre, enjoying a drink at the Farmers Inn Hotel, to exploring the historic Burrum Hall.

The community holds its sporting culture in high regard. The town has tennis and cricket clubs, as well as an Australian Rules football and netball club. The football and netball club merged with the neighboring town of Brocklesby in 2006 to create a single club with a broader population base.

== Climate ==
Climate data for Burrumbuttock (Lat: 35.85° S Lon: 146.78° E) (precipitation normals 1961-1990)
Month	Jan	Feb	Mar	Apr	May	Jun	Jul	Aug	Sep	Oct	Nov	Dec	Year
Average precipitation mm (inches)	37.5 (1.48)	26.1 (1.03)	32.5 (1.28)	48.5 (1.91)	58.6 (2.31)	45.5 (1.79)	61.7 (2.43)	61.1 (2.41)	51.5 (2.03)	58.6 (2.31)	36.3 (1.43)	43.1 (1.70)	561 (22.11)
Source: Bureau of Meteorology

== People ==
- Tony Armstrong, former Australian Rules footballer and television presenter; 2022 Logie Awards winner for best new talent.
