= Wildland fire emission =

Wildland fire and wildland fire atmospheric emissions have been a part of the global biosphere for millennia. The major wildland fire emissions include greenhouse gases and several criteria pollutants that impact human health and welfare.:

Emissions	Grams of emission / kilogram of fuel burned	Percentage
Carbon dioxide	1564.8	71.44%
Water	459.2	20.97%
Carbon monoxide	120.9	5.52%
Atmospheric particulate matter <2.5μ	10.3	0.47%
Nitric oxide	8.5	0.39%
Methane	5.9	0.27%
Volatile organic compounds	5.2	0.24%
Organic carbon	5.2	0.24%
Non-methane hydrocarbon	4.3	0.20%
Particulate matter > 10μ	3.8	0.17%
Particulate matter <10μ and >2.5μ	1.9	0.09%
Elemental carbon	0.4	0.02%

Compared to the preindustrial era, wildland land fire in the conterminous U.S. has been reduced 90 percent with proportional reductions in wildland fire emissions. Land use changes (agriculture and urbanization) are responsible for roughly 50 percent of this decrease, and land management decisions (land fragmentation, suppression actions, etc.) are responsible for the remainder. Anthropogenic activities (e.g., industrial production, transportation, agriculture, etc.) today have more than replaced the lost preindustrial wildland fire atmospheric emissions.

The following charts compare preindustrial wildland fire emissions with contemporary emissions.

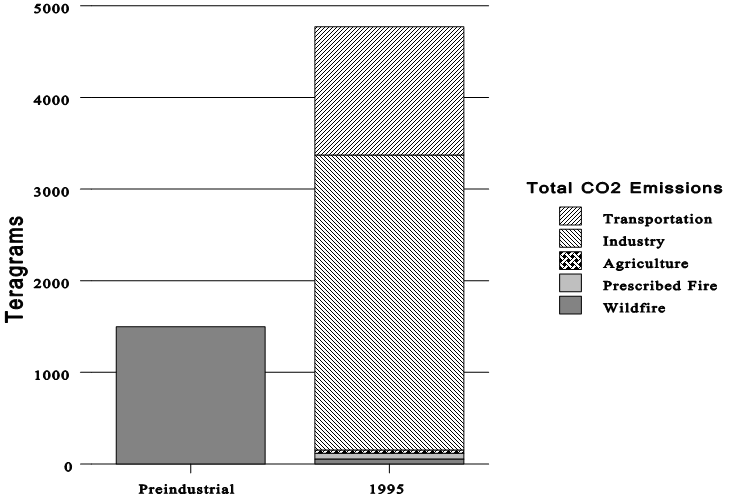
Carbon Dioxide

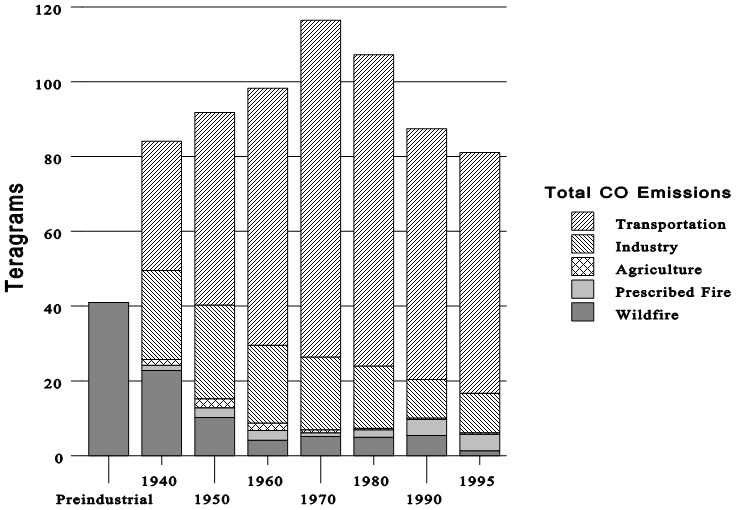
Carbon Monoxide

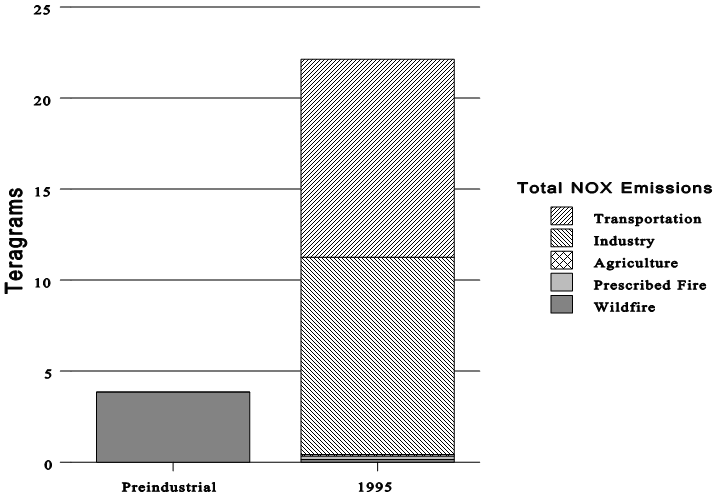
Nitric Oxide

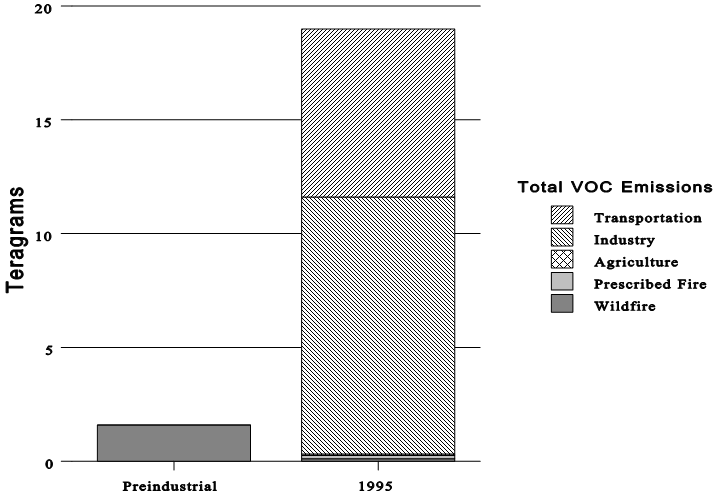
Volatile Organic Compounds

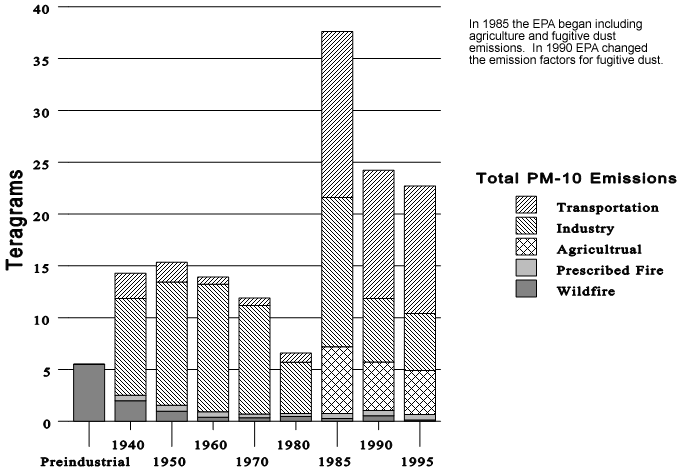
Particulate Matter <10μ

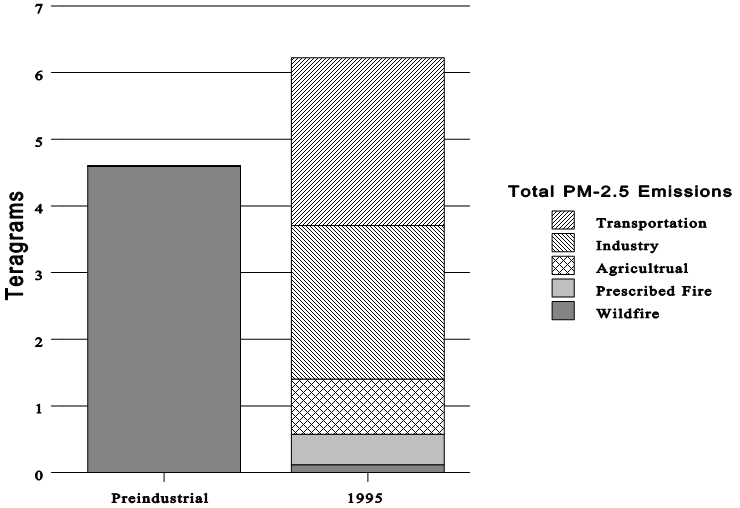
Particulate Matter <2.5μ

In addition to greenhouse gas emissions, particulates and smoke released can scatter or absorb solar radiation and be deposited elsewhere where they may affect albedo particularly if landing on snow or glaciers.
