= School of Law, Trinity College Dublin =

Oldest law school in Ireland

Coordinates: 53.344214°N 6.254437°W

The School of Law at Trinity College Dublin is the oldest established law school in Ireland. It teaches law to undergraduate and postgraduate students, as well as conducting legal research and holding conferences.

There are approximately 700 undergraduate students and 150 postgraduate students in the Law School. It publishes the Dublin University Law Journal and the Trinity College Law Review. The Law School is located in House 39 on New Square.

== Degrees ==
It offers five undergraduate degrees. The Bachelor in Laws (LL.B.), Law and French (the LL.B. (ling. franc.)), Law and German (the LL.B. (ling. germ.)), Law and Business (LL.B. Bus) and Law and Political Science (LL.B. Pol. Science) degrees are all four-year honors degree programmes in Law.

The School offers five taught Master in Laws degrees. Applicants who already hold a good honors (II.1) law degree or law related degree, can apply to study for the LL.M. (Master in Laws), Master in International and Comparative Law, Master in International and European Business Law and Master in Intellectual Property Law. All four postgraduate degrees are one-year taught programmes. The School of Law also offers two postgraduate research degree programmes - the M.Litt. or Ph.D., which are conducted by research. Finally, the LL.D. is an honour reserved for outstanding legal academics.

=== The LL.B. ===
In the freshman years of the LL.B., students study eight obligatory core law subjects:

- The Irish Legal System (including Legal Skills)
- Torts
- Constitutional law I
- Criminal law
- Contract law
- Administrative Law
- Private Law Remedies
- Equity
- Land law
- European Union law
- Constitutional law II

Mentoring Freshman law students can also choose to take a language course in the university.

Sophisters (third and fourth year students) choose 60 ECTs (European Credit Transfers) in each of the two years from a wide range of modules including commercial law, tax law, human rights law, corporate governance and criminology. They are also entitled to take a module in a different field under Trinity's Broad Curriculum programme. The marks obtained over the two final years count equally for the final degree grade.

==== Coursework ====
Each module generally has three hours of lectures per week throughout the year. There are also seminars attended by groups of approximately twelve students. Freshman modules have four seminars of one hour in length throughout the year. For sophister subjects, the number of seminars varies.

The Law School operates in 2 semesters, the examinations are respectively during December and at the end of the year, in the April–May period. The foundation scholarship exam is also available for senior freshman students, where they may sit an additional exam in January in order to win a scholarship. Many subjects allocate part of the grade for a major assignment submitted during the year.

==== International study ====
Junior Sophisters may study abroad for their third year on an exchange. Trinity has both Socrates or Erasmus exchanges with European universities and other reciprocal exchange agreements with universities in Canada, Finland and the USA. The Law School has exchange agreements with the following universities:

- Austria
  - Johannes Kepler University, Linz
- Belgium
  - Leuven University
- Canada
  - Osgoode Hall Law School
- Denmark
  - University of Copenhagen
- Finland
  - University of Helsinki
- France
  - Montesquieu University – Bordeaux IV
  - University of Strasbourg University of Strasbourg
  - University of Toulouse
  - Panthéon-Assas University
  - University of Poitiers
  - Institut d'Études Politiques de Paris (Sciences Po)
- Germany
  - University of Erlangen-Nuremberg
  - Hamburg University
  - Humboldt University, Berlin
  - Mainz University
  - University of Würzburg
  - LMU Munich
- Italy
  - University of Bologna
- The Netherlands
  - Leiden University
- Spain
  - University of Granada
- The United States of America
  - Emory University
  - Washington and Lee University
  - Indiana University Maurer School of Law

=== The law and language degrees ===
The degrees in Law and French and Law and German were created in 1993. They are taught in conjunction with Trinity's French and German departments. They are modelled on the LL.B., but also include study of the relevant language and civilisation and the civil and constitutional law of the relevant jurisdiction. It is obligatory for students on these courses to spend their third year on a Socrates exchange, where they study a range of law subjects in a French or German university. The marks obtained abroad count for 35% of a law and language student's degree grade. There are traditionally twelve places every year on each of these courses, however sixteen places were offered on the Law and German programme and thirteen places for Law and French for the academic year 2007–08. It is unclear whether this arrangement is to continue.

== Staff ==
The staff of the Law School includes a number of well-known Irish legal academics and authors of leading textbooks. The current Head of the Law School is Professor Oran Doyle. A number of lecturers, including Professor Ivana Bacik and William Binchy are known to the public for their involvement in political campaigns.

Past holders of the Reid Professorship in Criminal Law, currently held by Ivana Bacik, include former Presidents of Ireland, Mary Robinson and Mary McAleese.

== Student societies ==
A number of TCD student societies are particularly oriented towards law students. These are the Dublin University Law Society, FLAC (Free Legal Advice Centres) and the local branch of ELSA (European Law Students’ Association). The Law Society publishes student articles in the Trinity College Law Review. Many law students are active in the Hist and Phil and participate in debates and mooting competitions, such as the European Law Moot Court.
