= Income trust =

Vehicle that holds income-generating assets and distributes earnings to unitholders

An income trust is an investment that may hold equities, debt instruments, royalty interests or real properties. It is especially useful for financial requirements of institutional investors such as pension funds, and for investors such as retired individuals seeking yield. The main attraction of income trusts, in addition to certain tax preferences for some investors, is their stated goal of paying out consistent cash flows for investors, which is especially attractive when cash yields on bonds are low. Many investors are attracted by the fact that income trusts are not allowed to make forays into unrelated businesses; if a trust is in the oil and gas business, it cannot buy casinos or motion picture studios.

The names income trust and income fund are sometimes used interchangeably even though most trusts have a narrower scope than funds. Income trusts are most commonly seen in Canada. The closest analogue in the United States to the business and royalty trusts would be the master limited partnership. The trust can receive interest, royalty or lease payments from an operating entity carrying on a business, as well as dividends and a return of capital.

== Types ==
There are four primary types of income trusts:

=== Investment ===
Investment trusts (aka "mutual funds") are trusts established for communal investment in securities, encapsulated under the umbrella of a flow-through entity and typically managed by a 'fund sponsor', usually an investment firm, asset management firm, or investment bank. These trusts invest in a variety of investments including stocks, bonds, futures, etc., and are often marketed to the public directly when authorization has been received from provincial securities regulators to do so. This type of trust has not been affected by the recent changes in Canada concerning income trust taxation; like Canadian REITs, mutual fund investment trusts have been exempted from taxation. Some investment trusts have been specially structured with leverage in order to amplify cash yields paid to investors, while others deplete their assets to pay distributions to investors on a regular basis.

=== Real estate investment ===
Real estate investment trusts (REITs) invest in real estate: income-producing properties and/or mortgage-backed securities. The REIT structure was designed to provide a similar structure for investment in real estate as mutual funds provide for investment in stocks.

=== Royalty/energy ===
Royalty trusts, "resource trusts" or "energy trusts" exploit natural resources such as oil wells. The amount of distributions paid will vary from time to time based on production levels, commodity prices, royalty rates, costs and expenses, and deductions.

=== Business ===
Business income trusts are individual companies that have converted some or all of their stock equity into an income trust capital structure for tax reasons. Business income trusts are used in many sectors, such as manufacturing, food distribution, and power generation and distribution. They are not investment trusts in the classic sense, since they represent a single company's assets and not a pool of investments.

Among business trusts, utility trusts that invest in or operate public utilities such as electricity distribution or telecommunications are sometimes put in a separate category as they are inherently less growth-focused.

In the US, the business trust structure typically takes the form of publicly traded partnerships (PTPs) or master limited partnerships (MLPs), essentially limited partnerships (LPs) with units that trade on public securities exchanges. Those were very popular in the mid-1980s but are rare today. Revised IRS tax treatment of MLPs made the structure inefficient and infeasible, in light of the special tax that is levied on MLP owners who hold them in tax-deferred or exempt accounts such as 401(k)s, IRAs, and Roth IRAs. A more recent alternative called income depositary shares (IDS) has also failed to attract investor attention due to the trust activity being focused on the Canadian market.

== By country ==
The tax advantages offered to trusts in certain jurisdictions have fueled investor interest in this type of investment vehicle.

=== Australia ===
Resource-rich Australia has had royalty trusts (and REITs) for a long time but in the early 1980s, a wider range of firms sought the same tax benefits and started converting into income trusts. Yield-hungry investors jumped on the bandwagon and rewarded the trusts with higher valuations. When Queensland Coal converted to a trust in 1984, its stock price tripled overnight.

The Australian government, citing ever-increasing (but unquantified) losses of tax revenues, clamped down in 1985. All trusts except REITs and royalty trusts were given 3 years to find an exit strategy: to either keep the current structure at higher tax rates, or convert (back) to a public company. As unit prices started to collapse, the majority dropped the trust structure.

It is notable, however, that the legal trust structure and the public trust structure persists in Australia to this day. As of December 2006, the Australian government was revisiting the income trust issue to consider whether further legislation was needed to address the many thousands of trusts that have been maintained and developed since taxes were imposed in the mid-1980s.

=== Canada ===
The first Canadian tax ruling enabling the income trust structure, inspired by the American PTPs, was awarded in December 1985 to the Enerplus Resources Fund royalty trust. The first corporate conversion into a proper business trust, using the 1985 ruling, was Enermark Income Fund in 1995. The move attracted little attention at the time as the vast majority of trusts were still REITs and royalty trusts (the so-called "CanRoys").

A substantial historic and status report on the Canadian income trust market was published at the end of 2006 coinciding with the announcement of new taxes on income trusts proposed by the Canadian Minister of Finance"Breach of Trust" (PDF). Advocis Forum magazine from the Canadian Association for Professional Financial Planners and Advisors. December 2006. Archived from the original (PDF) on 2014-05-14.

The trust structure was "rediscovered" after the dot-com crash of 2000, as investment banks were searching for new sources of fees after the initial public offering (IPO) market had dried up. The first high-profile conversion was former Bell Canada Enterprises unit Yellow Pages Group becoming the Yellow Pages Income Fund and raising Can$1 billion in the process. By 2002, trusts accounted for 79% of all money raised through IPOs in Canada, with only 38% in the traditional sectors of petroleum and real estate. By 2005, the income trust sector was worth Can$160 billion (approximately US$135 billion at October 2005 rates). The mere announcement by a company of its intention of converting could add 10-20% to its share price.

Trusts received another boost in 2004-2005 as the provinces of Ontario, Alberta and Manitoba implemented limited liability legislation that shields trust investors from personal liability. (Such legislation existed in Quebec since 1994.)

Partly as a result of this ruling, Standard & Poor's then announced plans to add the largest income trusts to the S&P/TSX Composite Index (which it eventually did on December 19, 2005), starting with a 50% weighting and gaining full representation on March 17, 2006. A new equity-only composite index would be created that will resemble the present structure without trusts. This move is seen as a strong gesture of support for the trusts, who would see increased demand from index fund managers and institutional investors replicating the index. However, the S&P, as a major bond rating agency, has expressed concerns about the sustainability and the quality of the accounting concerning many trust entities as going concerns in the future.

Business trusts came to the attention of the government. In the March 2004 federal budget, Liberal Finance Minister Ralph Goodale had tried to prohibit pension funds from investing more than 1% of their assets in business trusts or owning more than 5% of any one trust. Powerful funds led by the Ontario Teachers Pension Plan, which at the time had a significant stake in the Yellow Pages Income Fund, fought the proposed measure; the government backed off and suspended the restrictions.

On October 31, 2006, Goodale's successor, Conservative Jim Flaherty announced a new 34% tax on income trust distributions in a bid to stem the growing number of companies that were converting to trusts. Since January 2011, all Canadian income trusts (except REITs) are considered as Specified Investment Flow-Through (SIFT) entities that are subject to double taxation at a rate approximately equal to corporate income tax rates.

==== Suspension of advance tax rulings ====
On September 8, 2005, the Canadian Department of Finance issued a white paper suggesting that the trusts had cost it at least Can$300 million in tax losses the preceding year, with provincial governments possibly losing another $300 million. The markets barely reacted and on September 13, Gordon Nixon, CEO of the Royal Bank of Canada, mentioned in passing that he was not opposed to Canada's largest bank converting into a trust. One week later on September 19, the Department of Finance announced that it was suspending advance tax rulings – essential for investor confidence – on future trusts.

The resulting uncertainty caused an immediate slump with the trust market losing approximately $9 billion in market capitalization during the following week. This caused CanWest Global Communications to reduce its proposed $700 million IPO spin-off to $550 million. CI Fund Management also showed hesitation regarding its planned trust conversion. Previous plans by ACE Aviation Holdings to spin off Air Canada Jazz into a trust were suspended indefinitely. "Traditional" Canadian REITs, once content to ride the trust boom, tried to distance themselves from the new business trusts, to avoid regulatory "collateral damage".

In the day following the change in working tax policy, the unit price for all income trusts and REITs on the TSX dropped by a median of more than 17% according to the iTrust Report published by TrustInvestor.com and its iTrust Index. Studies by Leslie Hayman, publisher of the Report, indicated that the change in advance tax rulings in 2005 was the most statistically significant volatility event in the history of the trust market.

According to RBC Dominion Securities, yearly trust cash distributions amounted to Can$16 billion in 2005, not including potential capital gains taxes on trust conversions. Of that amount, $3.3 billion was collected in tax. RBC estimates that taxing trusts like regular companies could slash the market value of Canadian business trusts by as much as 30% – again, not counting the loss of the share price premium of companies that had announced their conversion and would then back off.

Following the announcement, Goodale and the Department of Finance declined to comment or answer questions on the future of income trusts. Intense lobbying efforts to "save the trusts" were undertaken by the business community and the Conservative Party. They demanded that if equal treatment is to be granted to trusts and traditional companies, it should be implemented by leaving the trusts alone and cutting corporate and/or dividend tax to match the trust advantage. That solution would cost the government an additional Can$1 billion, which the lobbyists claim would be a small price to pay for stabilizing the market and satisfying the public investors/voters.

Since any decision was to affect the finances of an unknown proportion of the government's voting base, the trust debate turned into an important issue in the 2006 election. Analysts were trying to estimate the political repercussions, mostly depending on how much retail investors, especially seniors saving for retirement, were involved in the market. Some analysts put this at 60-65% of the market, up to 80% when counting mutual funds. If this is the case, a pre-election decision unfavorable to income trusts would have proven hazardous to Prime Minister Paul Martin's minority Liberal government.

==== Dividend tax cut announcement ====
The government found itself under increasing pressure throughout November as the opposition moved towards a vote of no confidence that meant the Liberal government might not remain in place by the time the trust consultation and review concluded on December 31. After the close of the markets on November 23, 2005, Mr. Goodale made a surprise announcement that the government would not tax the trusts, and would instead cut dividend taxes; the advance tax rulings were also resumed. The announcement described the proposed cut:

"To accomplish this, the Government proposes to introduce an enhanced gross-up and dividend tax credit (DTC) for eligible dividends received by eligible shareholders. An eligible dividend will be grossed-up by 45%, meaning that the shareholder includes 145% of the dividend amount in income. The DTC in respect of eligible dividends will be 19%, based on the 2010 federal corporate tax rate as proposed in the 2005 federal budget. The existing gross-up and tax credit will continue to apply to other dividends."

The markets rallied in the hours leading to the announcement (the government denied any leaks, see below) and on the following days as well, sending the S&P/TSX Composite Index to a new five-year high. The day's biggest gainers were income trusts, income-trust candidates, high dividend-paying companies, and the TSX Group itself. Former trust candidates such as Air Canada Jazz announced that they were considering a trust conversion or spinoff once again.

The decision, while applauded by financial circles, was widely seen as confused and hurried (an earlier government statement on the same day had mistakenly suggested a slight tax on the trusts).

The Liberal government had come under fire for the very strong stock market rally that immediately preceded the announcement, suggesting leaks from government insiders to financial circles. Opposition parties requested an official investigation on insider trading activity on that day. The Ontario Securities Commission has rejected the suggestion, saying it amounted to political interference; however, the Royal Canadian Mounted Police launched an inquiry on December 28, 2005. On February 15, 2007, the RCMP announced the conclusion of the income trust investigation and laid a charge of 'Breach of Trust' against Serge Nadeau, an official in the Department of Finance. Finance Minister Goodale was cleared of any wrongdoing.

==== New rules ====
Following announcements by telecommunications giants Telus and Bell Canada Enterprises of their intentions to convert to income trusts, on October 31, 2006, Finance Minister Jim Flaherty proposed new rules that would end the tax benefits of the income trust structure for most trusts. The new rules broke the Conservative Party's election promise to avoid taxing income trusts.

Brent Fullard of the Canadian Association of Income Trust Investors pointed out that at the time of the announcement Telus and Bell Canada Enterprises did not pay any corporate taxes nor would they for several years. According to his analysis, had Bell Canada Enterprises converted to a trust it would have paid $2.6 to 3.17 billion in the next four years versus no taxes as a corporation.

Subsequent to the October 31 announcement by Flaherty, the TSX Capped Energy Trust Index lost 21.8% in market value and the TSX Capped Income Trust Index lost 17.6% in market value by mid-November 2006. In contrast, the TSX Capped REIT Index, which is exempt from the 'Tax Fairness Plan', gained 3.2% in market value. According to the Canadian Association of Income Funds, this translates into a permanent loss in savings of $30 billion to Canadian income trust investors.

In the month following the tax announcement, the unit price for all 250 income trusts and REITs on the TSX dropped by a median of almost 13% according to the iTrust Report published by TrustInvestor.com and its iTrust Index. Studies by Leslie Hayman, publisher of the report, indicated that the tax news at the end of 2006 was the second most significant volatility event in the market following only the suspension of advance tax rulings by the Minister of Finance, Ralph Goodale in 2005. In Hayman's report entitled Breach of Trust, published as the 2006 year-end market review in Forum magazine by Advocis, the Financial Advisors Association of Canada, detailed analysis showed the substantial value to investors of the income trust structure and Canadian market being erased through new taxation.

Income trusts, other than real estate income trusts, and mutual fund investment trusts, that were formed after that date were to be taxed in the same way as corporations:

- income flowed out to investors were subject to a new 34% tax as of 2007 (which fell to 31.5% in 2011), which approximates the average corporate income tax paid by corporations—this is equivalent to the current prohibition against deducting dividends paid to investors in determining corporate taxable income; and
- income flowed out to investors are eligible for the dividend tax credit to provide equivalent treatment to dividends paid by corporations.

Income trusts formed on or before that date were not subject to the new rules until 2011 to allow a period of transition. Real estate income trusts are not subject to the new rules on real estate income derived in Canada (the non-Canadian real estate operations of existing REITs are subject to the same taxation as business trusts).

Flaherty proposed to reduce the federal corporate income tax rate from 19% to 18.5% in 2011. The 34% tax on distributions is split between the federal and provincial governments.

Flaherty also introduced a $1000 increase to the amount on which the tax credit for those over 65 (the "age amount") is based, and new rules to allow senior couples to split pension income in order to reduce the income tax they pay. Flaherty said these changes were designed to mitigate the impact on seniors of the new income trust rules.

The legislation to implement these proposals was included in the 2007 federal budget, which was presented to Parliament by Jim Flaherty on March 19, 2007.

===== Department of Finance role in decision =====
While at the Department of Finance, Mark Carney engineered the federal Conservative government's plan to tax income trusts at source. Carney was a Senior Associate Deputy Minister of Finance, and expected to succeed David A. Dodge as the Governor of the Bank of Canada on February 1, 2008. Carney was appointed by Finance Minister Flaherty on October 4, 2007.

The Department of Finance also eliminated a 15% withholding tax on foreign leverage buyout loans, and created capital insertion rules that restrict growth on Canadian trusts. Brent Fullard claimed that this creates conditions which favour foreign entities who purchase Canadian income trusts and are not required to comply with rules that restrict growth. that constituted Mark's idea of accountability and transparency."

===== Support =====
The Conservatives had the support of the Jack Layton and the New Democratic Party, and a majority of provincial finance ministers on this issue. The Conservatives lost Bloc Québécois support because of Bloc concerns of capital losses to small Canadian investors.

Jack Mintz of the C.D. Howe Institute noted in a December 2004 brief that the dividend tax credit changes were not sufficient to level the playing field between income trusts and corporations, and that the tax system continued to distort the efficiency of capital markets. Further, he wrote that "The tax system encourages excessive distributions since trusts that retain taxable profits are subject to onerous taxation."

The C.D. Howe Institute issued a report in October 2006 in which Mintz indicated that since 2004 "the income trust market has grown by about a third from $62 billion to $83 billion in issuance". He estimated that the total reduction in federal and provincial taxes to be $700 million annually, and that with the proposed conversion by BCE and Telus to trusts, the total federal and provincial tax reductions for investors would rise to $1.1 billion annually.

In a November 2006 The Globe and Mail's survey of business leaders (CEOs, CFOs and the like), 58% supported the proposed changes. Most support was related to different tax treatment of trusts over other corporate structures. The CEO of EllisDon was quoted as saying "I just don't see the logic in allowing a group of companies to pay dramatically lower taxes than private companies or companies that aren't organized that way. I really don't see how [the government] had any choice."

When the final vote on the Conservative budget was held, the Bloc supported the taxation of income trusts in the "Tax Fairness Plan" as a quid pro quo for receiving a huge allocation of cash from the Conservative government. Canada's Senate later passed this budget as law. Gwyn Morgan former president and CEO of Encana continued to support the changes in taxation in an October 31, 2007, interview on BNN.

===== Opposition =====
Criticism of the new tax rules included:

- The effect of the rules on the sector, on owners of income trust units, and the breaking of an explicit campaign promise by the Conservative Party.
- The lack of consultation by the government, and criticism of the execution of the decision (timing of the announcement, the way in which it was announced, and potential malfeasance by insiders).
- The substance of the decision and the reasoning and data provided by the government to justify the decision. These reasons include, in particular, challenges to the government's calculation and methodology of 'tax leakage'.

Economist Yves Fortin has challenged the reasons for the change in tax regime announced by Flaherty and disputed the Harper government assertion that the trust structure has led to loss of tax revenue because of trust conversions in a research paper.

The December 2006 report, Breach of Trust, summarized the facts underlying previous and subsequent presentations made by Leslie Hayman to the government on behalf of more than 4500 income trust investors, fund managers and analysts who subscribed to Reports on the market by TrustInvestor.com. Its on-going in-depth analysis indicated that flow-through structures provided generally greater contractual transparency in business management and better total overall returns to investors than other equity issuers and issues in general, while providing relatively high and growing tax revenues to governments compared to other public equities and securities. Government regulation caused market volatility that broke the confidence of investors, many being retired do-it-yourself investors who rely on investment income: Government-driven volatility caused by both the Liberal government in 2005 and the Conservative government in 2006-2007 not only hurt the assets and diminished quality of life for Canadian investors. The Conservative Party won the Federal election on the basis that they and their leader, Stephen Harper promised to protect income trusts from additional taxation. By frightening investors into professionally managed funds, their policy-driven volatility strengthened the oligopoly among Canadian banks and financial services.

In a January 12, 2007 paper Fortin outlined his concerns regarding the claim of tax leakage. Flaherty stated in his October 31, 2006, policy statement "If left unchecked, these corporate decisions would result in billions of dollars in less tax revenue for the federal government to invest in the priorities of Canadians, including more personal income tax relief" but Minister Flaherty has not documented the claimed losses nor the methodology used to estimate them. Fortin's paper gives several examples on how the tax on income trusts could lead to a loss in government tax revenue.

Analyst Gordon Tait also raised concerns about the lack of consultation and misconceptions surrounding the change in tax policy on trusts in "The Inconvenient Truth About Trusts", although Mr. Tait also notes that he recognizes "the dilemma the Finance Minister found himself in," and that "the potential for a large number of corporate conversions to income trusts necessitated some kind of action."

A December 11, 2006 "Income Trust Report" by PricewaterhouseCoopers reviewed the surveys and studies conducted in 2004 and 2005, the economic benefits and impact of income trusts in Canada. The report concluded that income trusts do have a place in Canadian capital markets and the 'Tax Fairness Plan' is unfair to Canadian investors who hold trusts in a tax-deferred Registered Retirement Savings Plan or a registered retirement income fund.

Analyst Cameron Renkas examined the Department of Finance assertion that the United States and Australia have taken action to shut down flow-through structures. In his research paper "Digging Deeper" he gives a perspective on how the United States taxes publicly traded flow-through entities and master limited partnerships, the US equivalent of Canadian income trusts.

Analyst Dirk Lever wrote on January 15, 2007: "We cannot understand why any Canadians would support double taxation of retirement benefits - it affects all of us eventually." Mr. Lever also looked at the Conservative government's policy in his research paper "Deep Dive into Tax Issues: Canadian Pensioners Taxed Twice on Canadian Corporate Dividends". In the report Mr. Lever questions the logic behind double taxation of dividends, and claims that foreign investors pay less tax on distributions than domestic investors. The proposed solution, however, is not to retain the existing benefits of income trusts, but to have identical tax regimes for both corporate and income trust distributions (dividends). The report does not address the benefit received from tax deferred savings plans (such as RRSPs and pensions) at the time of contribution, nor the tax-free accumulation throughout the life of these plans.

Hearings on the proposed changes to income trust taxation by the House of Commons' Finance Committee commenced January 30, 2007. John McCallum, the Liberal Finance critic, called on Minister Flaherty to explain the reasoning behind the change in income trust tax policy. In a February 8, 2007, news release McCallum said that "essentially they released close to a thousand pages of public documents, not one of which brings Canadians any closer to understanding what type of information or calculations led the Minister break his election promise and tax income trusts, either the Minister is in contempt of the committee's motion or he had absolutely no data from his own department before shutting down the sector and destroying tens of thousands of Canadians' life savings."

In a July 9, 2007, interview on Business News Network, former Conservative Alberta Premier Ralph Klein criticized Prime Minister Stephen Harper and Flaherty for their mishandling of the income trust issue and for not keeping their word on income trust taxation. According to the Canadian Association of Income Trust Investors, the change in tax rules cost investors billions of dollars in market value. Harper had promised "not to raid Senior's nest eggs" by changing taxation rules for income trusts only a few months earlier during the 2006 federal election.

===== Standing Committee on Finance report =====
On February 28, 2007, the House of Commons Standing Committee on Finance released a report "Taxing Income Trusts: Reconcilable or Irreconcilable Differences?"

===== Challenge under NAFTA =====
On October 30, 2007, American citizens Marvin and Elaine Gottlieb filed a Notice of Intent to Submit a Claim to Arbitration under the North American Free Trade Agreement (NAFTA). The couple claimed that thousands of U.S. investors lost a total of $5 billion in the fall-out from the Conservative government's decision to tax income trusts in the energy sector at the same rates as corporations, removing the tax advantage of the income trust structure.

Under the NAFTA, Canada is not allowed to target other NAFTA citizens when they impose new measures. The NAFTA also stipulates that Canada must pay compensation for destroying investment by U.S. investors. Prime Minister Harper made a public promise that his government would not tax trusts, as had the previous Liberal government. Canada's tax treaty with the United States also says that trust income will not be taxed at more than 15%.

The Gottliebs maintain a website for American and Mexican citizens interested in filing a NAFTA claim against the Government of Canada.

==== Examples of publicly traded royalty trusts ====
- Baytex Energy Trust (Canada: oil and natural gas)
- BP Prudhoe Bay Royalty Trust (US: Prudhoe Bay oil field, Alaska)
- Canadian Oil Sands Trust (Canada: oil sands)
- Enerplus Resources Fund (Canada: oil and natural gas; properties both in Canada and the U.S.)
- Harvest Energy Trust Canada: 70% oil, 30% natural gas, and also owns a refinery)
- Permian Basin Royalty Trust (US: Texas, oil and gas)
- Penn West Energy Trust (Canada: oil and gas)
- Pengrowth Energy Trust (Canada: oil and gas, including oil sands)
- Precision Drilling Trust (Canada: drilling contractor to the oil and gas industry)

==== Private energy income trusts ====
- Petrocapita Income Trust (Canada: western Canada, oil and gas)

=== United States ===
In the US, the business trust structure appeared with publicly traded partnerships (PTPs; also known as master limited partnerships or MLPs) which were limited partnerships with units that trade on public securities exchanges, combining the tax advantages of partnerships with the liquidity of public companies. PTPs started in the early 1980s in the oil and gas and real estate industries. As the decade went on, a variety of other businesses, from manufacturers to the Boston Celtics basketball team, began using the PTP structure .

In 1987, there were more than 100 PTPs and Congress estimated that the trend was costing Washington $245 million a year in lost revenue. A law was enacted that treated PTPs as corporations unless they derived 90 percent of their income from so-called "passive sources", which included interest, dividends, capital gains, real estate rents, income and capital gains from real estate (e.g., developers and homebuilders), income and gain from natural resources activities, and commodities. All existing PTPs whose income did not qualify (roughly a third of them) were given 10 years before they would be taxed as corporations. Just like in Australia, many of these eventually changed structures, went off the market, etc., but the decade-long transition meant fewer sharp losses for investors. Others such as Cedar Fair received a special tax rate at the end of the ten years on the condition that they would not be allowed to diversify outside of their core businesses. Only three of these "grandfathered" PTPs exist today; however, those with qualifying income, primarily in the energy sector, have thrived, and there are roughly 100 trading today.

With the Canadian income trust market booming in the 2000s, American investment bankers have tried to import the Canadian model in a structure called income depositary shares (IDS). A handful of small IPOs have used this model since late 2003; but due to lack of investor demand, interested companies have preferred to go public directly in the hot Canadian market. ("Chasing Higher Yields Up North". BusinessWeek. March 28, 2005. Archived from the original on September 12, 2005.)

== Tax characteristics ==
In a typical income trust structure, the income paid to an income trust by the operating entity may take the form of interest, royalty or lease payments, which are normally deductible in computing the operating entity's income for tax purposes. These deductions can reduce the operating entity's tax to nil.

The trust in turn, "flows" all of its income received from the operating entity out to unitholders. The distributions paid or payable to unitholders reduces a trust's taxable income, so the net result is that a trust would also pay little to no income tax. The net effect is that the interest, royalty or lease payments are taxed at the unitholder level.

1. As a flow-through entity (FTE) whose income is redirected to unitholders, the trust structure avoids any possible double taxation that comes from combining corporate income tax with shareholders' dividend tax.
2. Where there is no double taxation, there can be the advantage of deferring the payment of tax. When the distributions are received by a non-taxed entity (like a pension fund), all the tax due on corporate earnings is deferred until the eventual receipt of pension income by participants of the pension fund.
3. Where the distributions are received by foreigners, the tax applied to the distributions may be at a lower rate determined by treaty, that had not considered the forfeiture of tax at the corporate level.
4. The effective tax an income trust owner could pay on earnings could actually be increased because trusts typically distribute all of their cashflow as distributions, rather than employing leverage and other tax management techniques to reduce effective corporate tax rates. Certain investors, particularly those in the highest tax brackets, could be significantly worse off investing in income trusts compared to traditionally structured corporations. While the benefits of trusts for tax-deferred and tax exempt entities are clear, trusts are clearly less attractive for other investors facing high marginal rates.

== Investor risks ==
Generally, income trusts carry the same risk levels as dividend paying stocks that are traded on stock markets. And since income trusts or dividend paying stocks sometimes pay out a portion of their profits every month, investors get the equivalent of a capital gain (in the form of monthly distributions) on their investment without having to sell their stocks. Income trusts are equity investments, not fixed income securities, and they share many of the risks inherent in stock ownership, but often not the same rights and responsibilities, especially concerning corporate governance and fiduciary responsibility. Investors in Canadian income trusts cannot rely upon provisions in the Canada Business Corporations Act allowing for derivative actions and the oppression remedy, and often do not even have the right to elect a board of directors. Each trust has an operating risk based on its underlying business; the higher the yield, the higher the risk. They also have additional risk factors, including, but not limited to, poorer access to debt markets.

- Valuation: When distributions include return of capital the investor is receiving excess capital back from operations of the trust. A trust unit with high return of capital distributions will often attract a higher market value because the return of capital portion of the distribution is tax deferred until the unit is sold.
- Lack of income guarantees: similar to a dividend paying stock, income trusts do not guarantee minimum distributions or even return of capital. If the business starts to lose money, the trust can reduce or even eliminate distributions; this is usually accompanied by sharp losses in units' market value.
- Exposure to interest rate risk: since the yield is one of the main attractions of income trusts, there is the risk that trust units will decline in value if interest rates in the rest of the cash/treasury market increase. This risk is common to other dividend/income based investments such as bonds.

Interest rate risk is also present inside the trusts themselves on their balance sheets since many trusts hold very long term capital assets (pipelines, power plants, etc.), and much of the excess distributable income is derived from a duration mismatch between the life of the asset, and the life of the financing associated with it. In an increasing interest rate environment, not only do the attractiveness of trust distributions decrease, but quite possibly, the distributions themselves decrease, leading to a double whammy of both declining yield and substantial loss of unitholder value.

- Sacrifice of growth unless more equity is issued: because most income is passed on to unitholders, rather than reinvested in the business. In some cases a trust can become a wasting asset. Because many income trusts pay out more than their net income, the shareholder equity (capital) may decline over time. For example, according to one recent report, 75% of the 50 largest business trusts in Canada pay out more than they earn. However a PriceWaterhouseCoopers study indicated that contrary to opinions expressed elsewhere, Income Trusts were efficient at reinvestment in their businesses and added significant value for their unitholders.
- Exposure to regulatory changes: to the extent that the value of the trust is driven by the deferral or reduction of tax, any change in government tax regulations to remove the benefit will reduce the value of the trusts. See Canadian income trusts below on how changes in Canadian taxation rules diminished market values.

== See also ==
- Flow-through entity
- Income fund
- Investment trust
- Real estate investment trust
- Royalty trust
