= Companies listed on the New York Stock Exchange (P) =

== P ==
Stock name	Symbol	Country of origin
Pacific Coast Oil Trust	ROYT	US
Pacific Drilling S.A.	PACD	US
Packaging Corporation Of America	PKG	US
Pall Corporation	PLL	US
Pampa Energía S.A.	PAM	Argentina
Pandora Media, Inc.	P	US
Panhandle Oil and Gas Inc	PHX	US
PAR Technology Corporation	PAR	US
Park Electrochemical Corporation	PKE	US
Parker Drilling Company	PKD	US
Parker Hannifin Corporation	PH	US
Parsley Energy, Inc.	PE	US
PartnerRe Ltd.	PRE	Bermuda
Paycom	PAYC	US
PBF Energy	PBF	US
PBF Logistics LP	PBFX	US
PCM Fund, Inc.	PCM	US
Peabody Energy	BTU	US
Pearson PLC	PSO	United Kingdom
Pebblebrook Hotel Trust	PEB	US
Pembina Pipeline	PBA	Canada
Pengrowth Energy	PGH	Canada
Penn Virginia	PVA	US
Penn West Exploration	PWE	Canada
PennantPark Investment Corporation	PNTA	US
PennyMac Loan Services	PFSI	US
PennyMac Mortgage Investment Trust	PMT	US
Penske Automotive Group	PAG	US
Pentair, Ltd.	PNR	Ireland
Pep Boys Manny Moe & Jack	PBY	US
Performance Sports Group Ltd.	PSG	US
PerkinElmer	PKI	US
Permian Basin Royalty Trust	PBT	US
Perrigo	PRGO	US
Petrobras	PBR	Brazil
Petrobras - Petróleo Brasileiro S.A.	PBR.A	Brazil
Petrobras Argentina	PZE	Argentina
PetroChina	PTR	China
Petroleum & Resources Corporation	PEO	US
Petroquest Energy, Inc.	PQ	US
Pfizer Inc.	PFE	US
Pacific Gas and Electric Company	PCG	US
PharMerica Corporation	PMC	US
PHH Corporation	PHH	US
Philip Morris International	PM	US
Philippine Long Distance Telephone Company	PHI	Philippines
Phillips 66	PSX	US
Phillips 66 Partners LP	PSXP	US
The Phoenix Companies	PNX	US
The Phoenix Companies, Inc.	PFX	US
Phoenix New Media Limited	FENG	China
Physicians Realty Trust	DOC	US
Piedmont Natural Gas	PNY	US
Piedmont Office Realty Trust	PDM	US
Pier 1 Imports	PIR	US
Pike Corporation	PIKE	US
Pinnacle Entertainment	PNK	US
Pinnacle Foods	PF	US
Arizona Public Service	PNW	US
Pioneer Energy Services Corp.	PES	US
Piper Sandler	PIPR	US
Pitney Bowes	PBI	US
Plains All American Pipeline	PAA	US
Plains GP Holdings, L.P.	PAGP	US
Plantronics	PLT	US
Platform Specialty Products Corporation	PAH	US
Platinum Underwriters Holdings, Ltd.	PTP	US
Plum Creek Timber	PCL	US
Ply Gem Holdings, Inc.	PGEM	US
PNC Financial Services	PNC	US
PNM Resources	PNM	US
Polaris Industries	PII	US
PolyOne Corporation	POL	US
Polypore International, Inc.	PPO	US
Portland General Electric Company	POR	US
Portugal Telecom SGPS SA	PT	Portugal
POSCO	PKX	South Korea
Post Holdings, Inc.	POST	US
Post Properties Inc.	PPS	US
Potash Corporation of Saskatchewan Inc.	POT	Canada
PowerSecure International, Inc.	POWR	US
PPG Industries, Inc.	PPG	US
PPL Corporation	PPL	US
PPL Capital Funding, Inc.	PPX	US
Praxair, Inc.	PX	US
Precision Drilling Trust	PDS	Canada
Premiere Global Services, Inc.	PGI	US
Prestige Brands Holdings, Inc.	PBH	US
Pretium Resources Inc.	PVG	US
Primerica, Inc.	PRI	US
Primero Mining Corp.	PPP	US
Principal Financial Group	PFG	US
Principal Real Estate Income Fund	PGZ	US
PrivateBancorp, Inc.	PVTD	US
ProAssurance	PRA	US
Procter & Gamble	PG	US
Progressive Corporation	PGR	US
Progressive Waste Solutions Ltd.	BIN	US
Prologis, Inc.	PLD	US
Promotora de Informaciones, S.A.	PRIS	Spain
PROS Holdings, Inc.	PRO	US
Prospect Capital Corporation	PRY	US
Prosperity Bancshares, Inc	PB	US
Protective Life Corporation	PL	US
Protective Life Corporation	PLP	US
Proto Labs	PRLB	US
Provident Bank of New Jersey	PFS	US
Prudential plc	PUK	United Kingdom
Prudential Financial	PFK	US
Prudential Financial, Inc.	PJH	US
Prudential Financial, Inc.	PRH	US
Prudential Financial, Inc.	PRU	US
Telkom Indonesia	TLK	Indonesia
Public Service Enterprise Group	PEG	US
Public Storage	PSA	US
Pulse Electronics Corporation	PULS	US
Pulte Homes	PHM	US
Puma Biotechnology, Inc.	PBYI	US
Putnam High Income Securities Fund	PCF	US
Putnam Managed Municipal Income Trust	PMM	US
Putnam Master Intermediate Income Trust	PIM	US
Putnam Municipal Opportunities Trust	PMO	US
Putnam Premier Income Trust	PPT	US
PVH Corp.	PVH	US
Pzena Investment Management	PZN	US
