= Canadian petroleum companies =

Although there are numerous oil companies operating in Canada, as of 2009, the majority of production, refining and marketing was done by fewer than 20 of them. According to the 2013 edition of Forbes Global 2000, canoils.com and any other list that emphasizes market capitalization and revenue when sizing up companies, as of March 31, 2014 these are the largest Canada-based oil and gas companies (they are either based entirely in Canada or majority Canadian owned).

As of 2009, Syncrude and Irving Oil were leaders in the Canadian industry, with Syncrude being the top producer of oil sands crude and Irving Oil operating the largest oil refinery in the country.

Canadian oil company profits quickly recovered following the 2008 financial crisis; In 2009 they were down 90% but in 2010 they reached $8.4 billion. The price gap between West Texas Intermediate oil ($85/bbl) and Western Canadian Select heavy crude ($65/bbl) with the price of upgraded synthetic oil surpassing WTI when supply falls (before being upgraded to synthetic crude, heavier oil produces fewer barrels of oil per metric ton than lighter oil). As of 2011, there were 2,412 oil and gas companies based in Calgary, Alberta alone.

According to a University of Calgary petroleum geologist, most oil sands companies in 2011 were still using 1980s recovery process technologies. With the price of oil at US$100, there was no incentive for companies to invest in research and innovation to be profitable. By 2001, the first commercial steam-assisted gravity drainage facility was started, and by 2011, there was more oil extracted from the oil sands using in situ steam-assisted gravity drainage (SAGD) than traditional bitumen strip mining extraction with its massive trucks, tailings ponds. By 2005, the petroleum industry in Canada began a major shift as oil producers renewed an interest in research and development projects to improve bitumen extraction technology and processing methods. From 2005 to 2010, ten oil and gas companies—including Suncor, Imperial Oil, Nexen, Calfrac and Laricina Energy Ltd.—increased the number of patent applications for new technologies to increase the amount of bitumen that can be recovered. According to the industry, in 2011, only 10% of the 1.6 trillion barrels (250 km^{3}) of crude buried in the oil sands, could be recovered with the 1980s technologies.

Canadian oil and gas companies with a market cap were included in the 2009 Forbes 500 list. In 2011, The Globe and Mail included eight oil and gas companies in their ranking of Canada's 1000 most profitable public companies. By 2013, Suncor and CNRL—Canada's two largest petroleum companies were also among top eleven of the country's most valuable companies.

In 2011, Canadian Natural Resources, overtook Suncor to become Canada's largest producer. Suncor produced 549,000 boe/d in 2012 only slightly higher than in 2011. In 2010, Canadian Natural Resources produced at a gross rate of 655,000 boe/d up from 600,000 boe/d the year before.

== Market capitalization (March 31, 2014), revenue (2022), profit (2022), production, reserves ==
Cumulative Market cap. rank	Name	Market cap. rank (all companies)	Market cap. (bln USD)	Revenue (bln Cdn)	Profit (mil Cdn)	Production (000 bpd)	*Proved Reserves (bill barrels)
1	Suncor	188	51.4622	62.907 ▲55%	9,077 ▲110%	724.7(2023); 562.4 (2013); 549.1 (2012)	7.2
2	Canadian Natural Resources	237	41.8688	49.530 ▲55%	10,937 ▲40%	1302.7(2023); 671.162 (2013); 654.665 (2012); 598.526 (2011)	2P 13.0 eq. Proved: 4.51 eq.
3	Cenovus Energy	458	22.599 Sept'13	71.765 ▲51%	6,450 ▼14%	768.7 (2023); 258.8 (2013); 230 *RBC est	1.9
acq	Husky Energy	361	29.5473	24.181▲5.4%	1,829 ▼9.5%	312.0 (2013); 301.5 (2012)	2P 2.915 (2.429); 2.375 oil .540 gas
4	Imperial Oil	253	39.5332	59.670 ▲65%	7,340 ▲300%	399(2023); 295 (2013); 282 (2012)	2.153 eq.
5	Enbridge	270	37.8299	53.309 ▲15%	2,938 ▼65%	na	na
6	TransCanada Corp.	331	32.2148	14,977▲14%	785 ▼66%	na	na
7	ARC Resources					342.0 2023; 340 2021	
8	Pembina Pipeline						
9	Ovintiv/Encana	na	22.692 June'11	5.858 ▲13.5%	236 ▲ (2794) '12	516.7 (2013); 527.8 (2012)	2.2
10	Tourmaline Oil					508.0 2023	
acq	Talisman Energy	na	21.162 June'11	4.486 ▼37.4%	(1175) ▼132 in 2012	373 (2013); 425.7 (2012)	1.0
11	Crescent Point Energy	na	17.317	3.526 ▲30.9%	144.876 ▼24%	120.288 (2013); 98.751 (2012)	0.663
12	MEG Energy						
13	Keyera						
14	Baytex Energy						

source for market cap, source for profit. Data rounded to nearest million.

- By market cap, Crescent Point Energy is the largest Canadian oil company never to make the global 500 list, according to Forbes
- Encana, Talisman Energy last made the Fortune 500 list in June 2011; Cenovus Energy dropped out December 2013.
- CNRL 2013 annual production was estimated to be 671,162 bbl (106,706.2 m^{3}) equivalent/d based on indicated production levels of 192,922 bbl (30,672.1 m^{3}) equivalent ngas (based on conversion factor of 5658.53 cubic feet::1 boe) and 478,240 bbl/d (76,034 m^{3}/d) of oil.
- proved reserves (doesn't include most bitumen/heaviest oil in reserves, in some cases probable reserves are included)
  - proved and probable reserves include those oil and possibly bitumen reserves estimated to be as much if not more than likely recoverable under most recent conditions, production of which is unrestrained by contingencies, for instance, under ideal conditions (the right bitumen extraction technology and oil price) Cenovus's reserves could be as high as 137 billion barrels (2.18×10^{10} m^{3}), 114 times larger than those presently recognized.
- After spinning off Cenovus Energy, Encana's production was 95% natural gas.
- based on conversion factor of .00018225 from cubic feet of natural gas to barrels of oil equivalent (1/5487).

== Other large oil and gas companies ==
These companies have at least 2 billion dollars in market value (6 of them being near or over $10 billion, the rest are between four and seven billion with the exception of Petrobank, Sherritt and Laricina Energy). In order of size

- Corporations that were all trusts until 2011 when they converted
  - Paramount Resources - Calgary based producer of oil and natural gas. The company operates in three Canadian provinces and two US states. Natural gas accounts for 80% of total production and 77% of total reserves.
  - Canadian Oil Sands - 36% interest in Syncrude could be worth as much as $US15 billion, revenue was $3.703 billion in 2012 up from $3.46 billion in 2010, $4.54 billion in 2008.
  - AltaGas - oil and gas infrastructure company
  - Penn West Petroleum / acq - Revenue was $2.64 billion in 2012, down 12% on the year, down 35% since 2008. For the first nine months of 2011 51.9% of company production came from light and medium oil up from 47.6% the year before (83,675 bpd out of 161,171 boe/d).
  - Crescent Point Energy - Oil and gas company with interests in the bakken oil field of Alberta. Revenue doubled between 2008 and 2010 (averaged $400 million '06-'08, ~$1.0b '08-'10) then doubled again between 2010 and 2012 ($1.2b - $2.2b). annual production was 33.8% higher in 2012 at 98,751 boe/d (90.8% crude oil). production was 41.5% higher in the third quarter of 2010 than the same period in 2009, to 65.548 bbl (10.4213 m^{3}) equivalent/d (89% crude oil); in July 2010 acquired Shelter Bay Energy (38.1 kbbl (6,060 m^{3}) equivalent of oil reserves) for $1.1 billion. Its market value climbed from $5.5 billion in August 2009 to $7.7 billion in July 2010 then surpassing $10 billion late that year.
  - ARC Resources - Just over $1.0 billion in revenue in 2012, 2011, and 2010 (up 23% versus 2009, about the same as it was in 2007), in 2009 revenue was at its lowest level in 5 years.
  - Baytex Energy - Most of production currently is heavy oil however many of its projects involve light oil.
  - Pengrowth Energy - For years between 2009 and 2012 revenue ranged from $1.1 to $1.2 billion, 16% more than what it was in 2006. Production grew 26.58% between 2006 and 2009 reaching 79,518 bbl (12,642.4 m^{3}) equivalent/d (about half from natural gas) though production was highest in 2007 (87,401 bbl (13,895.6 m^{3}) equivalent/d)
  - Enerplus - Has operations and projects in four Canadian provinces (Western Canada) and seven U.S. states. Produced about 79,000 bbl (12,600 m^{3}) equivalent/d in 2010 60% of which is natural gas. 2012 revenue was $1.19 billion about the same as 2010, half of what it was in 2008.
  - Inter Pipeline Fund private - Oversees one of Canada's biggest petroleum and petrochemical transport, pipeline and storage business; transports most of Canada's oil sands bitumen produced by such companies as Shell Canada, Chevron and Encana. Major moves include the 2007 $760 million acquisition of the Corridor pipeline in Alberta, 2008 $1.8 billion expansion of oil sands pipelines, 2004 $540 million purchase of 3 of Canada's largest natural gas treatment plants. Market value was $4 billion in 2008 more than 6 times what it was in 1997.
  - Keyera - midstream company with 18 natural gas liquid processing plants in Alberta.
- Independent Oil and Gas
  - Pacific Rubiales Energy - Deeply rooted in Colombia where it enjoys strategic partnerships with Ecopetrol (state oil company that produces about 63% of all Colombian oil and gas production) and where a major part of the company was started (Petro Rubiales, acquired in 2008 was one of the original developers of the Rubiales Field one of Colombia's largest). It is the 2nd largest independent oil and gas company operating in South America.
  - MEG Energy - Borderline large cap oil sands producer with 5 billion barrels (790,000,000 m^{3}) 6 billion barrels (950,000,000 m^{3}) of 2P reserves in Christina Lake and Surmont (the 2 projects are 50 km apart).
  - Tourmaline Oil - Primarily a natural gas company with operations in Northern BC and central Alberta. In the first half of 2012 88% of daily production was natural gas. In 2012 petroleum reserves were up 69%. On November 30, 2012 Tourmaline acquired Huron Energy Corp for 7.4 million of its own shares (~$200 million).
  - Athabasca Oil Sands Corp
  - Niko Resources Ltd - Oil and Gas company with significant natural gas reserves in India. It is also one of the largest owners of underwater exploration properties in Indonesia (though it has a history that goes back to 1987 it only recently began producing at significant levels).
  - Vermilion Energy, Pembina Pipeline, Petrobank Energy and Resources, Sherritt International Corporation, Laricina Energy (Private in-situ oil producer worth $1.2 billion)
  - Inter Pipeline - major processor of natural gas that handles bulk storage in Canada, the U.S., and Germany. Has considerable access to the Edmonton market through majority stake in the cold lake pipeline system.

== Suncor Energy ==
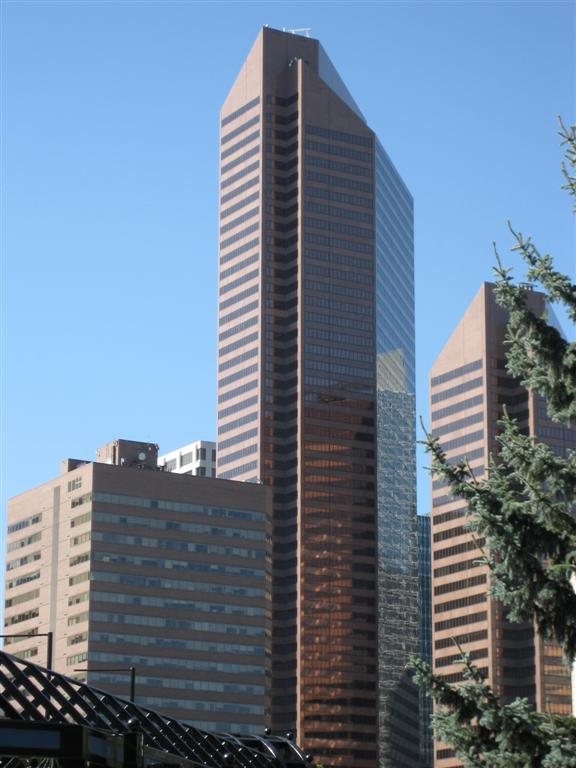
Suncor Energy Center

Revenue 36.82 bn MV 59.927 bn (2011)

- Suncor Energy completed merger with Canada's 11th largest company Petro Canada on August 1, 2009 in a 21 billion dollar deal to form the largest oil and second largest company overall in Canada. At the time of the merger it had a market capitalization of $43 billion and held the biggest position in Alberta's oil sands.
- 680,000 barrels per day (108,000 m^{3}/d) of oil production (532,000 from oil sands and conventional oil in 2008).
- with about $30 billion in revenue, $50 billion market capitalization and immense growth coming from the oil sands as a result of rising oil prices, the new company should rival the 12th and 13th largest oil and gas companies in the world Rusneft and Lukoil.
- After acquiring Petro Canada, Suncor divested at least $2.8 billion worth of Petro Canada assets.
- In November 2010 Suncor was Canada's 4th most valuable company.
- Recently has shown renewed interest in developing patents (including ones for conveyor belts and hand railings), when considered with nine other oil companies patent applications were up 250% between 2005 and 2010 when compared to 2000 to 2004.
- In December 2011 oil sands production was at a record high 346,000 bbls/d.
- Total production steady in 2012 at 549 mbbl/d. 2011 production fell 11.2% to 546 mbbl/d due to the loss of output from Libya. In 2008 production was 680 mbbl/d.

== Canadian Natural Resources Limited ==
CNRL, which has its headquarters in Calgary, Alberta, is Canada's largest oil producer. In the third quarter of 2021, the company made which made C$2.1 billion ($1.66 billion) adjusted profit. By November 4, shareholders had received $3.1 billion in 2021. shareholders has been significant totaling $3.1 billion year to date through dividends and share repurchases. It operates in the North Sea (4% of oil production), Western Canada (93% of oil / 97% of gas production), and West Africa (3% of oil / 2% of gas production).

In 2011, its revenue was $14.625 billion, MV 48.379 bn. In last quarter of 2011 company production leaped by a significant margin and stayed there: 2011 production: 657,599 b/d in the fourth quarter, 598,526 b/d over the entire year. Gross output went on to average 655th b/d in 2012 and 671th b/d in 2013. Oil accounted for 90% of product sales in 2013. In 2009, it was the 34th ranked oil company according to Fortune 500. It was 7th most valuable Canadian company in November 2010. In 2009, it was the 2nd largest natural gas producer in Canada.

- During the third quarter of 2010 upstream oil and natural gas production reached the highest rate among Canadian producers (the rate was not maintained however, production fell back slightly due to planned and unplanned maintenance shutdowns).

== Encana Corporation ==
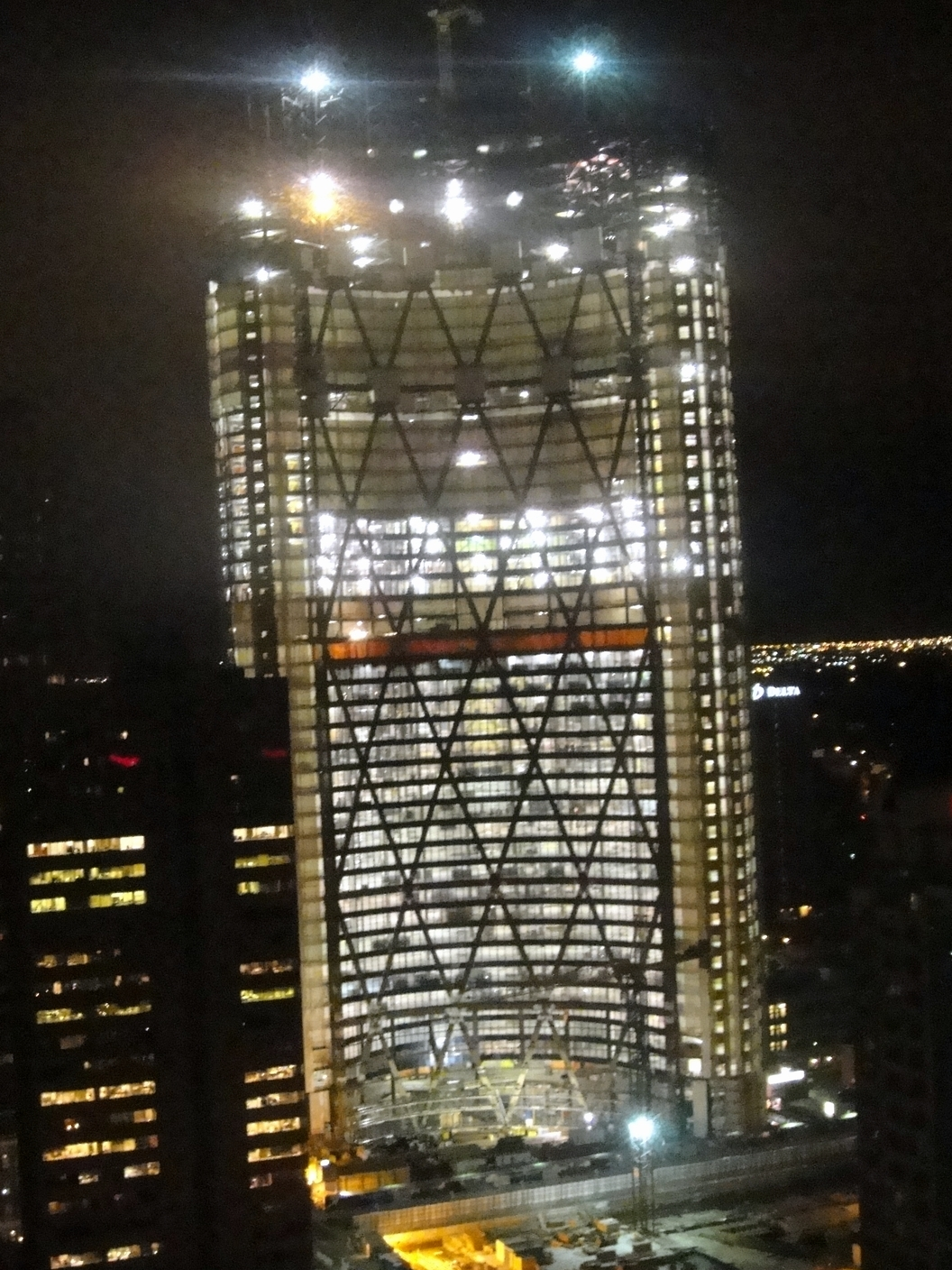
The Bow building under construction in June 2010

Revenue 9.097 bn MV 21.419 bn (2011)

Encana, North America's largest natural gas producer was formed in 2002 when PanCanadian Energy merged with Alberta Energy Company. It operates in Alberta, British Columbia, Nova Scotia, Colorado, Wyoming, Texas and Louisiana and had the largest reserve base among Canadian producers as recently as 2007. At the end of 2009 Encana created Cenovus Energy when it split its integrated oil and natural gas components. In February 2012 Encana sold 40% of its 100% interest in the Cutbank Ridge Complex, a natural gas resource in NE British Columbia. The deal is worth $2.9 billion, in 2011 the company made $3.5 billion in deals. The deal came just after another one involving Petro China collapsed.

- Headquarters: The 774 ft (236 m) tall skyscraper called The Bow is the tallest office building in Calgary and the tallest built in Canada since 1990.

== Husky Energy ==
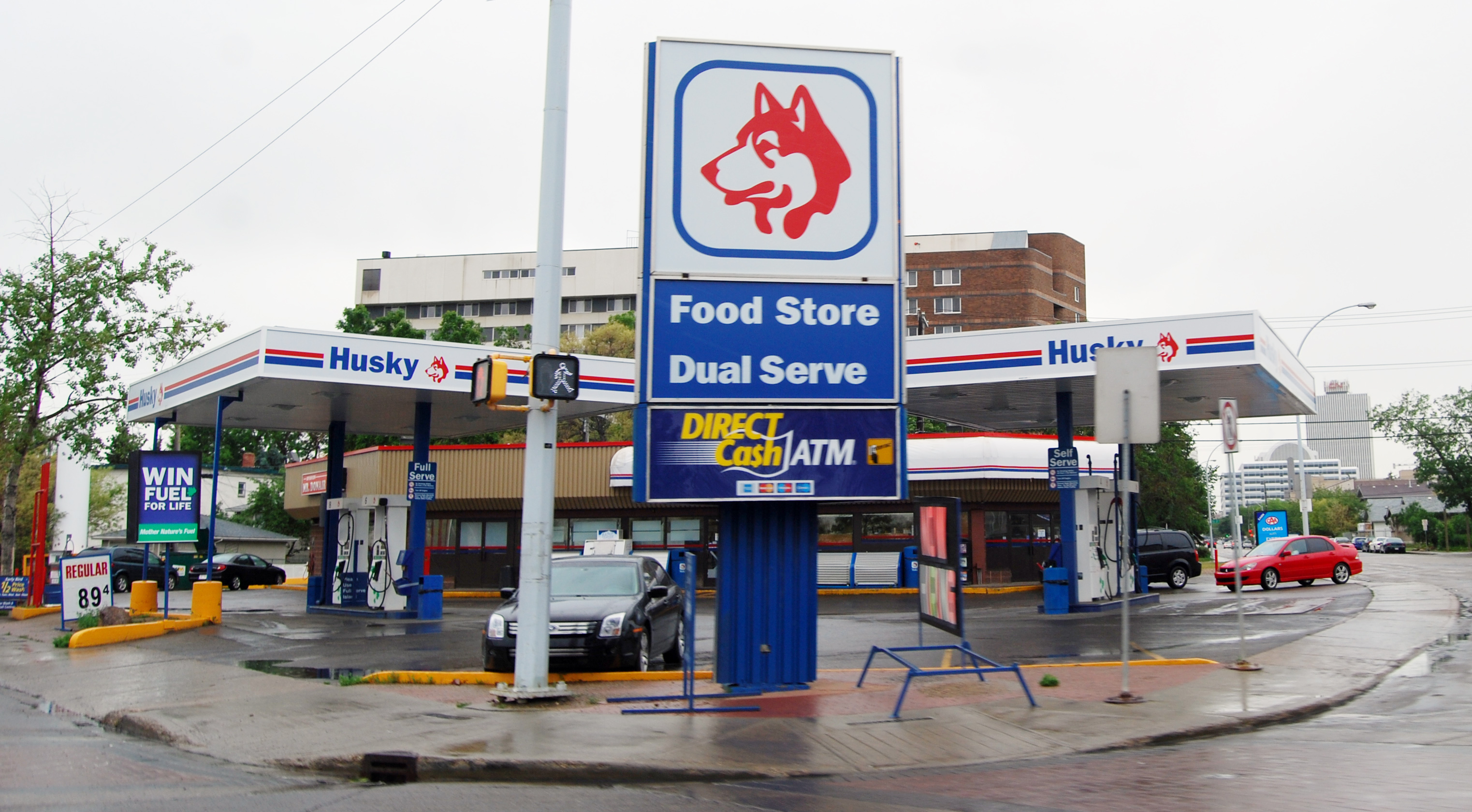
Husky gas station located in Edmonton, Alberta

Revenue 18.261 bn MV 23.648 bn (2011)

Husky Energy was founded in Wyoming by Albertan Glenn Nielson who with 2 partners, bought 2 heavy oil refineries, and used them to establish the Husky Refining Co. in 1938. This was followed by major purchases of oil rich land and gas stations. In 1946 Nielson moved part of the company to Canada where Husky Oil Ltd. was created separate from the parent company. By the late 1970s the company's need for more funding eventually forced Nielson to sell all his stake in the company. Another Albertan, Bob Blair CEO of the pipeline company AGTL (later renamed Nova Corp.) took advantage of the situation gradually increasing his stake in the company until he owned a controlling interest. About a decade later Husky ran into financial problems that were solved when Hong Kong billionaire Li Ka-shing started investing in the company leading to a buy out of Blair's interests in 1991. The 1988 acquisition of Centerra Energy Ltd. made Husky a top 10 Canadian oil company. After a turbulent couple decades, Husky reasserted itself as a major Canadian petroleum company in 2000 by purchasing Renaissance Energy Ltd. in a $3.02 billion deal.

Husky Energy has proven petroleum reserves of 430,000,000 barrels (68,000,000 m^{3}) and 2 trillion cubic feet (5.7×10^{10} m^{3}) of natural gas. It owns approximately 500 filling stations in Canada as well as property and/or mineral rights to some 6.67 million acres (27,000 km^{2}) in Western Canada.

Husky's oil production was exactly the same in 2011 as it was in 2003 (312,500 boe/d).

== Enbridge ==
Revenue 15.539 bn MV 21.664 bn (2011)

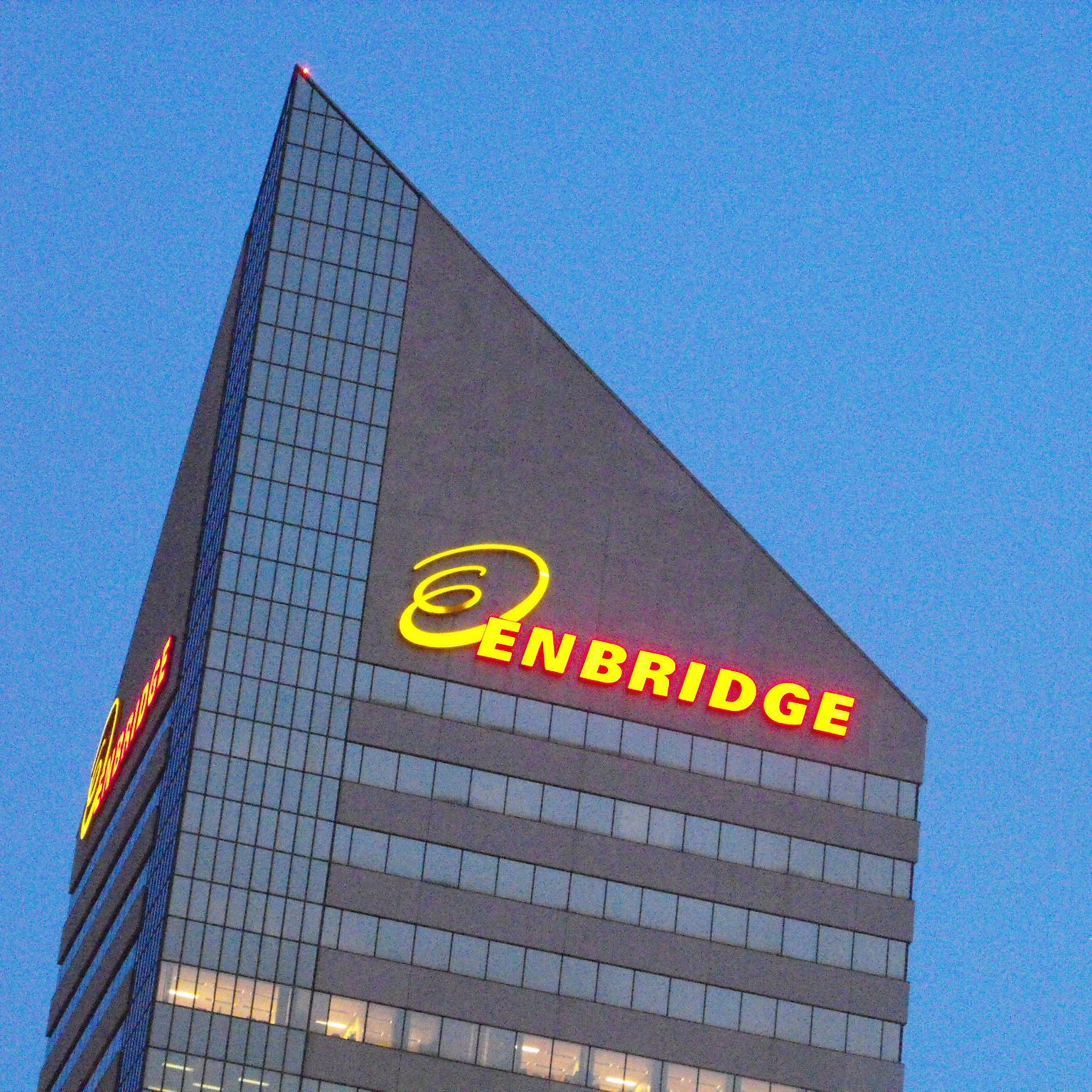
Enbridge building in Edmonton, Alberta

Began as a pipeline company called interprovincial pipelines incorporated by Imperial Oil in the 1940s as a result of growth at the Leduc oil fields in Alberta exceeding the capacity of Alberta's refineries to process the oil. In 1950 its pipelines were operational and in 1953 it was a publicly traded company at stock exchanges in Toronto and Montreal. By the late 1950s its main pipeline was almost 2,000 miles (3,200 km) long handling about 200,000 barrels (32,000 m^{3}) of oil per day in certain sections. In the late 1960s refineries in the US and Canada demanded more oil be delivered from Canadian sources, and the solution deemed best by management, and government officials was to build a new line through Chicago. The access expansion gave the company to Chicago helped the company grow rapidly and by the early 1970s throughput reached 900,000 barrels (140,000 m^{3}) of oil. By 1986 Imperial Oil's ownership of the company was down to 33% and through an exchange of shares Imperial Oil helped interprovincial acquire another oil company called Hiram Walker while subsequently changing its name to Interhome Energy Inc. Later it was renamed IPL Energy Inc. During the 1990s it acquired a number of other companies (consumers gas, altagas, interest in Chicap pipeline) which delivered natural gas as well but most of the company's business was still in crude oil. The new divisions gave the company greater access to Toronto, Quebec and New York. Its last name change made in 1998 was to Enbridge Inc. a combination of the words energy and bridge.

Currently Enbridge owns the world's longest oil pipeline system (delivers 2,000,000 barrels (320,000 m^{3}) per day), owns Canada's largest natural gas distributing company, and has 1.9 million customers. It is also active in the alternative energy sector, having an interest in wind farms, waste heat recovery plants and photovoltaic projects the largest of which is the Sarnia Solar Project.

Revenue comes from commodity sales (79%), gas distribution sales (6.9%), transportation and other services (14.0%).

== Cenovus Energy ==
Revenue 13.621 bn MV 25.049 bn (2011) Cenovus Energy Inc. is the former component of Encana that focused more on integrated oil than natural gas though natural gas continues to contribute about half of total production (exceeded oil (crude and synthetic combined) as recently as the end of 2009 however a steady fall in output combined with new oil sands production has reduced that).

Cenovus Energy owns a 50% interest in two major US refineries operated by Phillips 66, which can act as a natural hedge for the company as commodity prices fluctuate.

== Talisman Energy ==
In 2011 and 2012 Talisman sold off some of its largest assets including 50% of British operations; that resulted in revenue loss ($8.347b in 2011 to $7.312b in 2012).

Originally BP Canada, Talisman Energy is a publicly traded Tsx 60 petroleum company that operates in Canada, USA, Columbia, Scotland, Peru, Algeria, Tunisia, UK, Norway, Indonesia, Malaysia, Vietnam, Australia, and Qatar.

- 420,000 barrels (67,000 m^{3}) of oil per day production.

== CNOOC Petroleum North America ==
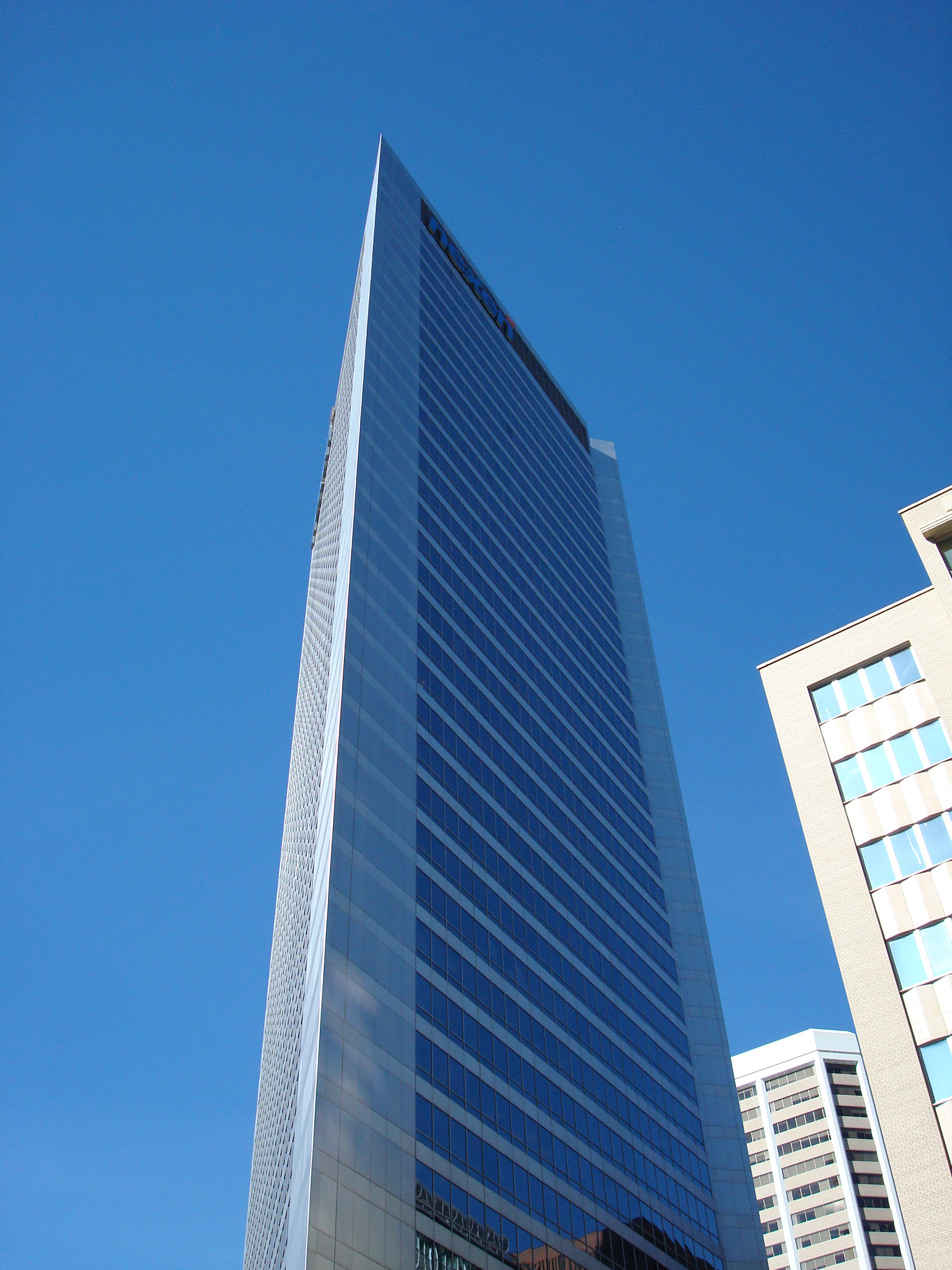
Nexen Building

Revenue 5.840 bn MV 11.986 bn (2011)

In February 2013 Nexen was taken over by Cnooc in a $15.1 billion deal. At the time, Nexen's 2.5 billion boe reserves would've ranked 8th among Canada's oil companies.

When Nexen was created in 1971 it was a subsidiary of the American company Occidental Petroleum called Canadian Occidental Petroleum. After taking over a number of smaller companies in Canada while increasing their international holdings they became larger and more independent of their parent company that by then held only a minor stake. In 2001 the name was changed to nexen in recognition of that. In 2012 the company profited $333 million on revenues of $6.7 billion which is down since 2008 (US$8–9 billion, market value of US$11.14 billion, and a profit of US$1.68 billion). On November 29, 2011 Nexen sold 40% of its Horn River, Cordova and Liard basins shale-gas assets in northeast B.C. to Inpex Corp and JGC Corp of Japanese for US$676 million. At the Long Lake project oil is upgraded by a process known as steam assisted gravity drainage.

Operates in Canada, Yemen, Colombia, West Africa and the UK (offshore).

- Market cap peaked in 2008 at between US$20 and 24 billion (at the time it was reported that oil major Total was prepared to offer US$19.7 billion for the company) but has since fluctuated between $US10 and $US14 billion

In February 2011 the Usan offshore oil field began producing. It has a capacity of 180,000 barrels per day and Nexen holds a 20% interest in it.

- production : 207,000 barrels (32,900 m^{3}) of oil/day in 2011 16% lower than the year before. Production net of royalties was 186,000 boe/d.

== Syncrude ==
- Based on the price paid for a 9% share by Sinopec the company could be worth as much as $US50 billion.
- Syncrude is the world's largest producer of oil sands crude.
- Opened in 1978 and started expanding in 1996
- is a joint venture involving 4 Canadian companies (80.97% owned), 3 American(19.93% owned), and 1 Japanese.
- #1 single source of oil in Canada

== Irving Oil ==
- operates the largest refinery in Canada and has 1.3 billion dollars in revenue
- The family that controls the company includes 3 billionaires Arthur, James, and John E. Irving *Operates 769 gas stations in Atlantic Canada, New England and Quebec as well as the convenience stores at many of those locations and the Big Stop chain of family restaurants.
- The company has been based in New Brunswick since it was established in 1924.

== Addax petroleum ==
Addax Petroleum (Sinopec) was one of about 60 Canadian companies that made it onto the Forbes Global 2000 2009 list. It was acquired by sinopec of China in June 2009 for C$8.27 billion.

== Forbes ranking of Canadian companies ==
113 oil and gas companies made the list in 2015 (down from 121 in 2014 / 98 in 2013 / 131 in 2012 / 126 in 2011 / 115 in 2010) 10 of which are Canadian (down from 12 in 2014 / 9 in 2013 / 13 in 2012 / 14 in 2011 / 8 in 2010).

In 2014 Enbridge and TransCanada re-entered the list after a one-year absence; Pembina Pipeline is also a new addition. Dropping out of the list was Canadian Oil Sands Ltd, Pacific Rubiales Energy in 2015, Penn West Petroleum in 2013, Arc Resources in 2012.

Revenue and profit are from the 12-month period ended March 2015, assets and market capitalization are from March (2014 for Canadian Oil Sands Ltd, Pacific Rubiales Energy)

May 2015 Cum. Rank	Name	Rank (all) 2013	Rank (all) 2014	Rank (all) 2015	2015 Rank (oil companies)	2014 Rank (oil companies)	2015 rev (bil.USD)	2015 Profit (mil.USD)	Assets (bil.USD)	Market cap March (mil.USD)
1	Suncor	142	149	188	20	20	34.0	1,300	62.9	44,900
2	Enbridge	na	344	245	25 ▲15	40 ▲	32.2	600	54.2	42,000
3	Canadian Natural Resources	288	278	257	27 ▲4	31 ▲2	17.1	3,600	53.4	35,300
4	Husky Energy	289	315	399	35	35 ▼1	21.9	1,100	34.5	21,400
5	TransCanada Corp.	na	390	406	38 ▲6	44 ▲	9.3	1,700	50.9	30,700
6	Cenovus Energy	427	523	637	51 ▲1	52 ▼11	17.8	674	21.4	14,600
7	Encana	1166	1189	677	54 ▲30	84 ▼18	7.6	3,400	24.6	9,800
8	Crescent Point Energy	1532	1586	1362	86 ▲17	103 ▼23	3.1	461	14.5	11,100
9	Pembina Pipeline	na	1533	1547	94 ▲7	101 ▲	5.5	347	9.7	10,900
10	Talisman Energy	1043	1405	1728	105 ▼10	95 ▼35	4.6	(960)	17.3	8.000
11	Canadian Oil Sands Limited	1130	1296	na	na	92 ▼28	3.9	800	9.6	10,100
12	Pacific Rubiales Energy	1641	1704	na	na	108 ▼23	4.6	400	11.2	5,900

Sources Oil Services 2015 Oil Operations 2015 Oil Services 2014 and Oil Operations 2014

== Key people ==
James Miller Williams, John T Ferguson, Richard L. George, Randy Eresman, David P.O'Brien, John C.S. Lau, Li Ka-shing, David D. Daniel, John Manzoni, Philip D. Dolan, Marvin Romanow, John Backer

== See also ==
- Hibernia (oil field)
- White Rose oil field
- Hamburg oil field, Alberta
