= Prudhoe (disambiguation) =

Prudhoe is a town in Northumberland, England.

Prudhoe may also refer to:

== Related to Prudhoe, England ==
- Prudhoe Castle

- Algernon Percy, 4th Duke of Northumberland (1792–1865), known as Lord Prudhoe between 1816 and 1847

- Prudhoe Town F.C., football club
- Prudhoe railway station, railway station on the Tyne Valley line

== Related to Prudhoe Bay, Alaska ==
- Prudhoe Bay, Alaska, a census-designated place (CDP) in Alaska
- Deadhorse Airport, also known as Prudhoe Airport
- Prudhoe Bay Oil Field, oil field on Alaska's North Slope

- Prudhoe Bay oil spill, a 2006 oil spill
- BP Prudhoe Bay Royalty Trust, New York-based owners of the oil field

== People with the surname Prudhoe ==
- Lord Prudhoe (see above)
- Mark Prudhoe (born 1963), English football goalkeeper
- William Prudhoe (1832–1908), mayor of Christchurch, New Zealand

== Other ==
- Prudhoe Lions, pair of Ancient Egyptian monumental sculptures
