= Royalty trust =

Type of corporation

A royalty trust is a type of corporation, mostly in the United States or Canada, usually involved in oil and gas production or mining. However, unlike most corporations, its profits are not taxed at the corporate level provided a certain high percentage (e.g. 90%) of profits are distributed to shareholders as dividends. The dividends are then taxed as personal income. This system, similar to real estate investment trusts, effectively avoids the double taxation of corporate income.

Texas oilman T. Boone Pickens is often credited with creating the first royalty trust in 1979; however Marine Petroleum Trust (Marps) was created in 1956, twenty three years earlier.

== Characteristics of royalty trusts ==
Royalty trusts typically own oil or natural gas wells, the mineral rights of wells, or mineral rights on other types of properties. An outside company must perform the actual operation of the oil or gas field, or mine, and the trust itself, in the United States, may have no employees. Shares of the trust generally trade on the public stock markets, but the trust itself is typically overseen by a trust officer in a bank.

They are a powerful investment tool for people who wish to invest directly in extraction of petroleum or mining of other materials, but who do not have the resources or risk tolerance to buy their own well or mine. Additionally, since trusts often own numerous individual wells, oil fields, or mines, they represent a convenient way for the average investor to diversify investments across a number of properties. Also, since commodities are considered a hedge against inflation, the popularity of royalty trusts as investments rises as interest rates rise, and their shares often rise as a result.

These trusts often attract investors with their relatively high yields; in 2007, their distributions were often in the 10 to 15 percent annual range. This makes the shares sensitive to interest rates, as share prices are likely to decline in periods of rising interest rates, and to rise when interest rates fall. Additionally, royalty trusts in the United States and Canada usually involve oil and gas fields or mines which are at or past their production peak, and will gradually decline in output as well as revenue; however, the infrastructure to develop them has already been built, so that an investor can expect a reasonably steady income stream.

In addition to allowing investors to achieve high distribution returns, especially during periods of low interest rates, royalty trusts allow investors to speculate directly on commodities such as gas, oil, or iron ore without having to buy futures contracts, or use the other investment vehicles traditionally associated with commodities—since the trusts trade like stocks. During times when a commodity price is rising, the share value as well as the dividend return of a trust engaging in production of that commodity will rise as well.

== Canadian royalty trusts (CanRoy) ==
Royalty trusts are found mainly in Canada and the United States; there is also one in Germany. Canadian royalty trusts, called "Canroys" or "CanRoys", typically trade on the Toronto Stock Exchange, while some of the larger trusts also trade on the New York Stock Exchange. Canroys usually offer higher yields than U.S. trusts; for non-Canadian investors, this higher yield is reduced by the 15% foreign tax withholding that is absent in the U.S. trusts.

The most significant difference between Canadian and U.S. royalty trusts involves their legal status in their respective countries. In the U.S., trusts are not allowed to acquire additional properties, once they are formed. Since they are restricted to their original properties – for example, a group of oil fields or natural-gas-bearing rock formations—they can be expected to be depleted over time, the royalties they pay out will correspondingly decline, and eventually the trust will be dissolved. In Canada, trusts may be actively managed, and run as businesses. They may have employees, issue new shares, borrow money, acquire additional properties, and may manage the resources themselves.

Bell Canada Enterprises corporate unit Yellow Pages Group converted to Yellow Pages Income Fund on 25 June 2003, making it the "first high-profile conversion to the trust structure". Their income fund raised "$1-billion in the process".

According to a 2012 article in Canadian Energy Law,

"The royalty trust and income trust markets trace their origins to 1986 and 1995, respectively. As interest rates declined during the period and beyond these trusts became popular, since they provided lofty yields well in excess of the prevailing interest rate payable by corporations with similar credit ratings. The reason for the discrepancy was primarily due to the fact that royalty trusts and income trusts were flow-through vehicles that avoided the payment of corporate level tax. The yields payable by these trusts varied, but were typically in the 8 – 10% range."

— Doug Richardson 2012

Richardson argued that by 2012 foreign asset income trusts (FAITs) had revived interest regarding income trusts in Canada. Because FAITs involve assets outside Canadian borders, they are "not subject to traditional Specified Investment Flow-Through (SIFT) rules".

=== Hallowe'en massacre ===
In 2006 $70 billion of new trust conversions were announced. The largest was proposed in September 2006 when Bell Canada Enterprise BCE announced its intention to convert its Bell Canada subsidiary to a CanRoy trust thereby saving the corporation $800 million in tax by 2008. The royalty trusts were increasingly popular because they do not pay corporate tax, rather they "pay out most of their income in distributions to unit holders, who then pay tax on those distributions". On 31 October 2006 then-Finance Minister Jim Flaherty made his now famous proposal to introduce new rules — later known as Specified Investment Flow-Through(SIFT) rules — nicknamed the "Halloween Massacre". Under Prime Minister Stephen Harper — who was sworn into office 6 February 2006 after winning against the incumbent Paul Martin — the Canadian federal government announced the elimination of the loophole that placed over 250 income trusts at a tax advantage over other corporations. Starting in 2011 "income trusts, with the exception of those focused on real estate, would be subject to a tax on trust distributions" at the full 31.5% rate. Existing trusts would have a four-year transition period (2007 to 2011) whereas newer trusts such as the proposed Bell Canada trust would be applicable in 2007. What prompted the move was that the trusts were costing the Canadian government upwards of $500,000,000 each year in lost revenue. Flaherty described the conversion of corporations into royalty trusts as "a growing trend to corporate tax avoidance" which was hurting the Canadian economy and defended his response as "measured". If the trend of trusts conversions was not stopped, it was estimated that the Canadian federal and provincial governments would lose "$1 billion annually in tax revenue".

Immediately after the announcement share prices of the trusts dropped. Penn West Exploration. then- Penn West Energy Trust) — still referred to as known as Penn West Petroleum in the media — In an interview in January, 2013 Matt Donohue, an analyst at UBS AG in Calgary, argued that the growth-and-income model was "bruised" not "broken" with income trusts converting back into a corporate structure. With the increased use of horizontal drilling in the energy industry, energy trust adopt a hybrid policy that promised both "per-share growth and sustainable income for their shareholders". This model is least lucrative in periods of weak commodity prices.

Since the announcement of the Canadian "Tax Fairness Plan" approximately 90% of Canadian Royalty Trusts (CANROY's) have either converted to corporations, merged with other companies, or simply liquidated. While the Tax Fairness Plan did not require a conversion to corporate status most companies found it beneficial to do so. After conversion most companies were required to slash their dividend payouts to reflect the new level of taxation they would be required to pay.

== Publicly traded royalty trusts ==
- Baytex Energy Trust TSX: BTE (Canada: oil and natural gas)
- BP Prudhoe Bay Royalty Trust NYSE: BPT (US: Prudhoe Bay oil field, Alaska)
- Canadian Oil Sands Trust TSX: COS (Canada: oil sands)
- Enerplus Resources Fund TSX: ERF (Canada: oil and natural gas; properties both in Canada and the U.S.)
- Permian Basin Royalty Trust NYSE: PBT (US: Texas, oil and gas)
- Penn West Energy Trust TSX: PWT (Canada: oil and gas)
- Pengrowth Energy Trust TSX: PGF (Canada: oil and gas, including oil sands)
- Precision Drilling Trust TSX: PDS (Canada: drilling contractor to the oil and gas industry)

=== Former publicly traded royalty trusts, now liquidated ===
- Torch Energy Royalty Trust (originally traded on NYSE under the symbol TRU) (US: Louisiana, Alabama, Texas; mainly natural gas; trust liquidated in 2008)
- LL&E Royalty Trust (original NYSE symbol LRT; Pink Sheets symbol LRTR) (US: Florida, Alabama, and in the Gulf of Mexico; oil and gas); the trustee sought to liquidate the trust at 31 December 2010, but unitholders sued to attempt to prevent this.

== See also ==
- Investment trust
- Income trust
- Real estate investment trust
- Mutual fund trust
