= Trinidad Drilling =

Trinidad Drilling Ltd.
- Type: Public
- Traded as: TSX: TDG
- Industry: Oil and gas
- Founded: Calgary, Alberta (1996)
- Fate: Acquired by Ensign Energy Services
- Headquarters: Calgary, Alberta, Canada
- Key people: Lyle C. Whitmarsh, CEO; Brent J. Conway, President
- Products: Drilling & well services
- Revenue: $859.327 million CAN (2012)
- Number of employees: 3,000
- Website: www.trinidaddrilling.com

Trinidad Drilling Ltd. was a corporation headquartered in Calgary, Alberta, Canada that operated in the drilling and well servicing sectors of the North American oil and gas industry. Trinidad was acquired by Ensign Energy Services between late 2018 to early 2019, and was amalgamated into Ensign in 2019.

== History ==
The company converted to an income trust in 2002 and did business under the name Trinidad Energy Services Income Trust. It later reverted to a corporation under the name Trinidad Drilling.

In 2014 Trinidad entered a joint venture with Halliburton/Baker Hughes (40%) and plans to drill in Saudi Arabia that led to surmising of a Halliburton takeover plan.

In August 2017 Trinidad purchased RigMinder Inc. in a $40 million cash and stock acquisition. This has allowed the integration electronic data between the rig and the directional drilling tools as well as cutting costs.

In January 2018 Trinidad announced it would be moving eight rigs, two from Canada, three from Saudi Arabia, and three from other areas of the US, to the Permian Basin area in West Texas and New Mexico. The plans had to be altered because the company decided to sell the three rigs in Saudi Arabia instead of moving them. The price of around $114 million will see a net of $69 million with the rest going to partner Halliburton. According to the new report CEO Brent Conway stated "selling is a better option because the funds can be used for its capital program or to repay debt."

=== Acquisition ===
A strategic review process that began in late 2017, a procedure to court potential buyers looking for a "white knight" to reportedly maximize value for shareholders, was not fruitful. In August 2018 the company was tendered a formal unsolicited offer, that is considered a hostile takeover bid, by Ensign Energy Services. By October 2018 Precision Drilling made an offer, valued at over $1 billion, potentially pitting the two largest Canadian drilling companies against each other.

A turn of events started with the director of Trinidad Drilling purchasing shares of the company in August 2018 that happened during a strategic review process looking for buyers. When no offers were tendered Ensign Energy Services stepped in with an unsolicited offer or hostile takeover attempt, valued at C$947 million (US$720.26 million) including $477 million in debt at $1.68 a share. This was a 20% premium to the volume weighted average price of the common shares of Trinidad on the TSX for the trading days between August 1, 2018 through August 10, 2018 and an 11% premium to the closing price on the last trading day prior to the announcement. By the end of August 2018 Ensign owned 9.8 percent of Trinidad’s shares. Although not part of the strategic review process Ensign tendered an informal offer that was rejected. The company then made the same unsolicited offer formal. The Board of Directors has recommended shareholders reject the Ensign offer because it undervalues the company with a low balling bid.

The financial market has mixed reviews on the future company share value with National Bank Financial lowering the price objective for the stock in September 2018 from an outperform rating to a sector perform rating with a target price of $2.20 a share. Analysts at Canaccord Genuity lowered the price objective from $2.20 to $2.10 a share and BMO Capital Markets lowered the price objective from $3.00 to $2.00. Raymond James had raised the price objective from C$2.75 to C$3.00. Three investment analysts have issued a "hold" rating on the stock, five have it listed as "buy", with an average target price of C$2.41.

In October 2018 Precision Drilling entered into an agreeable negotiation with Trinidad, that includes a stock swap of 0.445 Precision stocks for each Trinidad stock. Including debt the deal is worth $1.03 billion dollars. Also included is a $20 million break fee that Precision will have to agree to pay if the deal does not materialize. A Raymond James analyst, Andrew Bradford, noted that Ensign could sweeten the deal, also agreeing to pay the break fee, or walk away. The counter offer may lead a bidding war that would be beneficial to Trinidad stock holders.

== See also ==
- List of oilfield service companies
