= Australian Worldwide Exploration =

AWE Limited
- Formerly: Australian Worldwide Exploration
- Type: Public
- Traded as: ASX: AWE
- Industry: Energy
- Founded: 1997
- Founder: Bruce Phillips
- Defunct: 2018
- Fate: Taken over by Mitsui & Co
- Headquarters: North Sydney, Australia
- Products: Gas; Oil
- Revenue: $104 million (2017/18)
- Net income: $41 million (2017/18)
- Website: www.awexplore.com

AWE, formerly Australian Worldwide Exploration, was an oil and gas producer with operations in Australia, Indonesia and New Zealand that was listed on the Australian Securities Exchange. In May 2018, it was taken over by Mitsui & Co and the brand retired.

The company's assets included the BassGas project in Bass Strait, Tasmania, the Casino gas project in Otway Basin, Victoria, and onshore Perth Basin interests in Western Australia.

== History ==
Australian Worldwide Exploration was established in 1997 and listed on the Australian Securities Exchange with its headquarters in Sydney and an office in Perth.

In November 1999 the Australian assets of Premier Oil were acquired. In January 2001, Premier Oil acquired a 23% shareholding in AWE. This was sold in June 2003.

In early 2001 AWE acquired 44.5% of the undeveloped Yolla field in Bass Strait.

In mid 2003, AWE acquired a 25% interest in VIC/P44. Transaction included the Casino gas field which was brought into production in 2006.

Tui Area, acquired in 2006, started oil production on 30 July 2007. In December 2013 company purchased an additional 15% interest in the Tui area oil project.

In 2006 AWE opened an office in Indonesia to review exploration and potential development opportunities. AWE's first drill in the Bulu basin took place in early 2008. In early 2012, AWE purchased a 100% interest and operatorship of two Indonesian Production Sharing Contracts: Ande Ande Lumut (AAL) oil field and the Anambas gas.

In August 2008 company merged with ARC Energy gaining additional equity in the BassGas and Cliff Head projects. In 2009 Australian Worldwide Exploration was rebranded as AWE Limited.

On 22 December 2016, AWE stated that the performance of Stage 1A of Waitsia gas project surpass pre-production expectations. In May 2018 AWE was acquired by Mitsui & Co and delisted from the Australian Securities Exchange.
