= PennWest =

PennWest may refer to:

- Obsidian Energy, a Canadian energy company previously known as Penn West Exploration Ltd., Penn West Petroleum and Penn West Energy Trust
- Pennsylvania Western University, a public university in the Pennsylvania State System of Higher Education

== See also ==
- Penn, West Midlands
- West Penn Railways
