= Mutual fund trust =

Tax-advantaged Canadian investment trust

A Mutual fund trust (MFT) is a type of Canadian investment portfolio which is popular in Canada due to favorable taxation laws. It is a type of unit trust which must also comply with section 132 of the Canadian Income Tax Regulation Act 4801. The members of a mutual fund trust are called unitholders.

== Definition ==
If a trust becomes a MFT within 90 days after the end of its first taxation year, it may make an election with the Canada Revenue Agency to be treated as such from the beginning of that taxation year.

Under Canadian Federal Legislation, a trust may elect to have its taxation year end on December 15 if it is a MFT on the 74th day after the end of a calendar year and its taxation year (the taxation year concerned) would normally end on December 31 of the calendar year.

A MFT must have 150 distinct unitholders by the end of its first full taxation year.

== RRSP Eligibility ==
A MFT is eligible for Canadian registered retirement savings plans (RRSP), registered education savings plans (RESP), or locked-in retirement accounts (LIRA). In addition to RRSP eligibility, MFTs have certain tax advantages to standard corporations and are typically deemed to be "flow-through" vehicles. Private mutual funds gained in popularity in Canada following the changes to tax legislation which forced many publicly traded royalty trusts to convert back into corporations. Investors seeking the high yields typically associated with the public royalty trusts are increasingly investing in private MFTs.

== Non-reporting Issuers ==
The MFT structure is frequently used to create investment holding vehicles for "non-reporting" issuers in Canada due to the tax efficiency and simplicity of creating eligibility for registered plans (RRSP, RESP, LIRA etc.) without having to go to the cost of creating a public company.

== See also ==
- Trust (law)
- Canada Revenue Agency
- Mutual fund
- Income fund
- Exchange fund
