= Suncor Energy =

Canadian energy company

Suncor Energy Inc.
- Type: Public
- Traded as: TSX: SU; NYSE: SU; S&P/TSX 60 component
- Industry: Oil and gas
- Predecessor: Sun Oil Company; Great Canadian Oil Sands
- Founded: August 22, 1979; 47 years ago
- Headquarters: Calgary, Alberta, Canada
- Key people: Richard Kruger (CEO) Russell Girling (chairman)
- Products: Petroleum; Natural gas; Petrochemicals
- Revenue: ▼CA$49.310 billion (2025)
- Net income: ▼CA$5.918 billion (2025)
- Total assets: ▲CA$89.913 billion (2025)
- Total equity: ▲CA$45.124 billion (2025)
- Number of employees: 15,424 (2025)
- Subsidiaries: Petro-Canada
- Website: suncor.com

Suncor Energy Inc. (French: Suncor Énergie) is a Canadian integrated energy company based in Calgary, Alberta. It specializes in production of synthetic crude from oil sands. In the 2026 Forbes Global 2000, Suncor Energy was ranked as the 256th-largest public company in the world.

Suncor was formed in 1979 through the consolidation of Sun Oil’s Canadian operations, including Great Canadian Oil Sands, which developed the world’s first commercial oil sands operation. Following its acquisition of Petro-Canada in 2009, the company became one of Canada’s largest integrated energy companies. In Canada, Suncor markets fuel primarily under the Petro-Canada brand, while in the United States it markets fuel through retail networks operating under the Shell, Exxon and Mobil brands.

== Predecessor companies ==
=== Sun Oil Company ===
The Sun Oil Company began operations in Canada in 1919 with the formation of the Sun Company of Canada. The company established offices in Montreal and imported petroleum products from the United States for sale in Canada. On 31 March 1923, Sun incorporated its Canadian subsidiary, the Sun Oil Company Limited. In 1932, the company relocated its headquarters from Montreal to Toronto. In 1950, the Sun Oil Company drilled its first successful Canadian oil well near Redwater, Alberta. In 1953, it opened a new refinery in Sarnia, Ontario.

=== Great Canadian Oil Sands ===
Great Canadian Oil Sands was incorporated on 29 December 1953, however, the company originated in several previous ventures dating back to 1920. In 1962, GCOS received a permit from the Government of Alberta to build a plant in the Athabasca Oil Sands. The following year, Sun purchased a majority stake in GCOS. The GCOS plant went online in 1967.

== History ==
In 1979, Sun formed Suncor by merging its Canadian refining and retailing interests; Great Canadian Oil Sands (a majority-owned subsidiary, which constructed and operated the first commercial plant to develop Canada's Athabasca oil sands and went on production in 1967); and its conventional oil and gas interests. In 1981, the Government of Ontario purchased a 25% stake in the company; it divested in 1993. In 1995 Sun Oil also divested its interest in the company, although Suncor maintained the Sunoco retail brand in Canada. With these two divestitures, Suncor become an independent, widely held public company.

In 2003, Suncor acquired a refinery and associated Phillips 66 gas stations in Commerce City, Colorado from ConocoPhillips. In 2005, Suncor acquired a second Commerce City refinery from Valero Energy. Suncor moved its retail brand from Phillips 66 to Shell from 2009 to 2013. Suncor added the Exxon and Mobil brands in Colorado and Wyoming in 2015.

On March 23, 2009, Suncor announced its intent to acquire Petro-Canada. This merger created a company with a combined market capitalization of C$43.3 billion. On June 4, 2009, a 98% approval rate was reached by Suncor's shareholders for the acquisition of Petro-Canada and the Competition Bureau approved the merger on June 21, 2009. The merger with Canada's 11th largest company was completed on August 1, 2009 in a $21 billion deal to form the second-largest company in Canada (after Royal Bank of Canada) in terms of market capitalization. In December 2009, as a condition of the merger, Suncor sold 98 gas stations in Ontario to Husky Energy, consisting of 68 Sunoco-branded locations and 30 Petro-Canada-branded locations.

In 2015, Suncor courted Canadian Oil Sands, the largest owner of the Syncrude project with 37% ownership (compared with Suncor's 12%), with proposals for acquisition and hostile takeover. In January 2016 they reached an agreement with Suncor acquiring COS for C$6.6 billion, raising its Syncrude ownership to 49%.

On April 27, 2016, Suncor announced that it had reached a $937-million deal to acquire Murphy Oil's 5% stake in the Syncrude project, growing its interest in Syncrude to nearly 54%, making it the majority shareholder of the project. In fall 2021, Suncor assumed operatorship of the Syncrude Joint Venture oil sands project in a bid to improve its performance. Suncor holds a majority stake in Syncrude with 58.74 per cent.

In April 2023, Richard Kruger was appointed president and chief executive officer of Suncor. In August 2026, Suncor announced that Peter Zebedee would succeed Kruger as president and chief executive officer in April 2027.

In June 2023, a cyberattack disrupted transactions with customers and suppliers and temporarily affected several company services, including digital payment systems. The company stated no customer information had been compromised.

In October 2023, Suncor Energy acquired TotalEnergies' Canadian operations for C$1.47 billion($1.07 billion).

== Operations ==
In North America, Suncor develops and produces oil and natural gas in Western Canada, Colorado, and offshore drilling in eastern Canada. Its international efforts include offshore developments in the North Sea, and conventional, land-based efforts in Libya, Syria, and Trinidad and Tobago.

Suncor operates refineries in Edmonton, Alberta; Sarnia, Ontario; Montreal, Quebec and Commerce City, Colorado. These refineries supply industrial, retail and commercial consumers. The company is also one of the largest Canadian retailers of petroleum products.

=== Upstream ===
Suncor is the world's largest producer of bitumen, and owns and operates an oil sands upgrading plant near Fort McMurray, Alberta, Canada. Originally developed by Great Canadian Oil Sands, a majority-owned subsidiary of Sun Oil, it is now wholly owned by the independent Suncor. It was the first commercial development on the Athabasca oil sands, although small, earlier projects like that at Bitumount also played a role in development. The company held a 36.75% interest in the Joslyn north oil sands project which was shelved pending an economic review by operator Total S.A. in May 2014. The Joslyn project was sold to CNRL in September 2018. The company also produces conventional oil, heavy crude oil, and natural gas.

Summary of Suncor's Upstream Operations
Project	Location	Type	Year Commissioned	2025 Production (kbpd)
Base Plant	Fort McMurray, AB	Mine & Upgrader	1967	263,000
Firebag	Fort McMurray, AB	SAGD	2004	245,000
MacKay River	Fort McMurray, AB	SAGD	2022	33,000
Fort Hills	Fort McMurray, AB	Mine	2018	175,000
Syncrude (Joint Venture, 58.74%)	Fort McMurray, AB	Mine & Upgrader	1964	222,000
Hibernia (Joint Venture, 20%)	Newfoundland	Gravity Base Structure	1997	14,000
Terra Nova (Joint Venture, 48%)	Newfoundland	FPSO	2002	11,000
White Rose (Joint Venture, 39%)	Newfoundland	FPSO	2005	4,000
Hebron (Joint Venture, 21%)	Newfoundland	Gravity Base Structure	2017	29,000

=== Refining ===
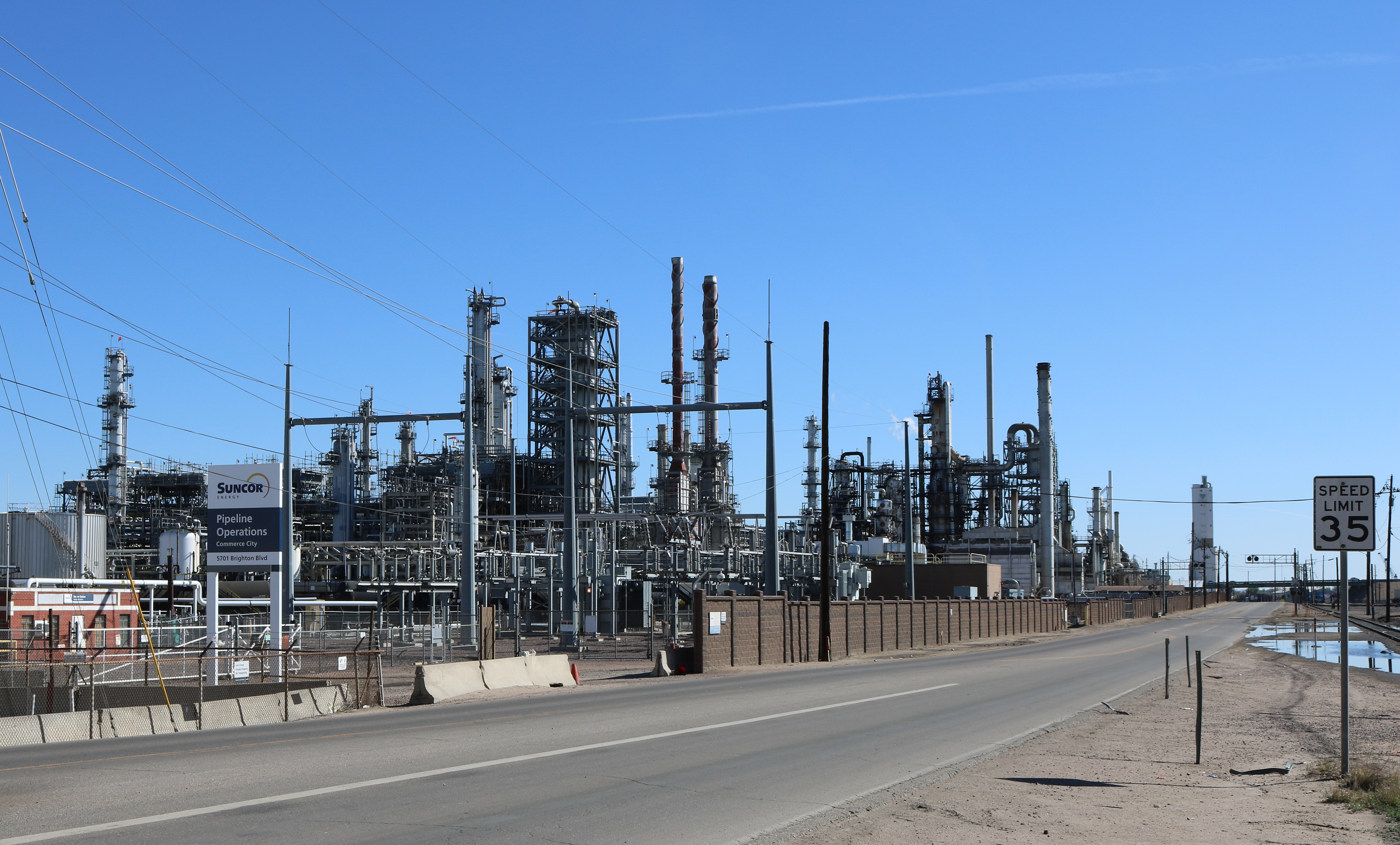
Suncor Energy's refinery in Commerce City, Colorado

In Canada, Suncor operates refineries in Alberta, Ontario and Quebec. The company's 135,000-barrel-per-day Strathcona, refinery runs entirely on oil sands-based feedstocks and produces a high-yield of light oils. A 137,000-barrel-per-day Montreal Refinery produces gasoline, distillates, asphalts, heavy fuel oil, petrochemicals, solvents and feedstock for lubricants. An 85,000-barrel-per-day refinery in Sarnia, Ontario produces gasoline, kerosene, jet and diesel fuels. A 98,000-barrel-per-day refinery in Commerce City, Colorado produces gasoline, diesel fuel and paving-grade asphalt.

Summary of Suncor's Refineries
Refinery	Year Commissioned	Employees	Throughput Capacity (bpd)
Edmonton	1951	~450	159,000
Montreal	1955	600	157,000
Sarnia	1952	500	92,000
Commerce City	1931	N/A	103,000

=== Retail ===
Suncor's main downstream brand in Canada is Petro-Canada. Suncor previously operated and franchised retail locations under the Sunoco brand, but post-acquisition, nearly all remaining Sunoco stations were converted to Petro-Canada. In addition, the company terminated all of its independent Sunoco franchises, as it planned to implement Petro-Canada's model of requiring franchisees to operate multiple locations. Presently, at least one Sunoco branded station exists, and is located in North Bay, Ontario. A group of affected franchisees filed a class-action lawsuit over the matter, claiming that Suncor had violated Ontario's Arthur Wishart Act. However, the case was blocked by an Ontario court.

In the United States, it operates retail outlets in Colorado under the Shell and Phillips 66 brands.

On April 13, 2012, Suncor paid a $500,000 fine after being found guilty of price-fixing in Ontario.

== Environmental record ==
According to a Pollution Watch fact sheet, in 2007 Suncor Energy's oil sands operations had the sixth highest greenhouse gas emissions in Canada. While Suncor has reduced the greenhouse gas emissions intensity of its oil sands operations by more than 50% since 1990, total greenhouse gas emissions from the company's operations have increased because of growing oil sands production.

On April 2, 2009, Suncor was fined $675,000 for failing to install pollution control equipment at its Firebag operation near Fort McMurray, Alberta in July 2006. On the same day, Suncor was fined $175,000 for dumping untreated wastewater from a company work camp near Fort McMurray into the Athabasca River in 2007.

In the United States, Suncor has also been fined by the Colorado Department of Public Health and Environment. In April 2012, a fine of $2.2 million was assessed for air pollution. Suncor failed to monitor and control emissions a number of times throughout 2009 and 2010, and numerous emissions exceeded regulations. Suncor was also cited for "failure to conduct equipment inspections, train employees, and fully develop standard procedures for operating equipment". Additionally, a benzene leak into Sand Creek was discovered in the fall of 2011. Employees at Suncor and the nearby Metro Wastewater Reclamation District Plant were exposed to benzene through the air and through drinking water. In April 2018, Suncor and ExxonMobil were sued by the city and county of Boulder, and the county of San Miguel over allegations that they were responsible for climate change in the state. The lawsuit was unique as it was one of the first to be based on these effects on a landlocked area, as opposed to those citing Sea level rise as a factor. In 2020, Suncor reached a US$9 million settlement agreement with authorities in Colorado for more than 100 air pollution violations from its Commerce City refinery. In 2024, Suncor settled with state regulators for US$10.5 million (a US$2.5 million fine and US$8 million in mandatory improvements) for violations by the Commerce City refinery, the largest settlement with a single facility over air pollution violations in Colorado history. Just months after the settlement, Colorado state regulators and the EPA regional office filed a joint notice claiming Suncor made additional pollution violations over the previous two years. According to the notice a federal and state inspection in October 2023 revealed that Suncor has continued to release benzene and other toxins in the air and water at the Commerce City plant. Also in 2024, a federal lawsuit was filed on behalf of a number of environmental groups seeking enforcement action against Suncor for repeated violations of the Clean Air Act. The lawsuit claims Suncor violated the Clean Air Act over 9,000 times. In May 2025, the Denver City Council voted unanimously to reject a $25 million asphalt contract with Suncor, despite the company having the lowest bid, due to its ongoing pollution issues in the state.

By 2009, Suncor was working to reduce the amount of bitumen entering tailings ponds. In 2009, under the auspices of the Natural Sciences and Engineering Research Council of Canada (NSERC), Suncor teamed with the University of Alberta and Matrikon, an Edmonton-based software company, to develop separation-cell technology to potentially reduce the amount of bitumen entering tailings ponds by 50 per cent.

By 2009, Suncor operated four wind farms. These wind farms provided 147 megawatts of power, providing an annual CO_{2} offset of 284,000 tonnes compared to coal-generated electricity. Suncor operates an ethanol facility in St. Clair Township, Ontario. The facility is the largest corn ethanol producer in Canada.

== Governance ==
=== President ===
1. Ross Allan Hennigar, 22 August 1979 – 11 January 1983
2. William Robert Loar, 27 January 1983 – 13 December 1984
3. Thomas Harold Thomson, 13 December 1984 – 1 February 1991
4. Richard Lee George, 1 February 1991 – 1 May 2012
5. Steven Walter Williams, 1 May 2012 – 14 November 2018
6. Mark Stephen Little, 14 November 2018 – 8 July 2022
7. Kristopher Peter Smith (interim), 8 July 2022 – 3 April 2023
8. Richard Michael Kruger, 3 April 2023 –

=== Chairman of the Board ===
1. Michael Milan Koerner, 29 January 1982 – 13 December 1984
2. William Robert Loar, 13 December 1984 – 30 September 1986
3. Michael Milan Koerner, 1 October 1986 – 1990
4. Thomas Harold Thomson, 1990 – 27 November 1992
5. Richard Lee George, 28 January 1993 – 1994
6. Robert Henry Campbell, 1994– 27 July 1995
7. William Robert Wyman, 27 July 1995 – 18 April 2001
8. James Robert Shaw, 18 April 2001 – 26 April 2007
9. John Thomas Ferguson, 26 April 2007 – 29 April 2014
10. James W. Simpson, 29 April 2014 – 27 April 2017
11. Michael M. Wilson, 27 April 2017 – 15 March 2024
12. Russell Keith Girling, 15 March 2024 –

== See also ==
- History of the petroleum industry in Canada (oil sands and heavy oil)
- History of the petroleum industry in Canada
- Syncrude
- Canadian petroleum companies
- List of articles about Canadian oil sands
