= Richard Kruger =

American business executive

- Born: March 10, 1959 (age 67); Minneapolis, Minnesota
- Education: University of Minnesota (BEng 1981); University of Houston (MBA)
- Spouse: Patti Kruger

Richard Kruger (born March 10, 1959) is an American business executive, and chief executive officer of Suncor Energy. He was CEO, chairman, and president of Imperial Oil from 2013 to 2019. Previously, he was President of Production and Vice President of Operations for ExxonMobil, having been employed by the company since 1981.

In September 2025, Kruger was honoured as Business Leader of the Year by the Canadian Chamber of Commerce.

Born March 10, 1959, he was raised in Richfield, Minnesota. A 1977 Richfield High School graduate, he holds a mechanical engineering degree from the University of Minnesota, and a business administration degree from the University of Houston.

In February 2023, Suncor Energy announced Kruger as its new chief executive officer. Kruger replaced interim CEO Kris Smith in April 2023.
