= Flow-through entity =

Business entity which is transparent for tax purposes

A flow-through entity (FTE) is a legal entity where income "flows through" to investors or owners; that is, the income of the entity is treated as the income of the investors or owners. Flow-through entities are also known as pass-through entities or fiscally-transparent entities.

Common types of FTEs are general partnerships, limited partnerships and limited liability partnerships. In the United States, additional types of FTE include S corporations, income trusts and limited liability companies.

Most countries require an FTE (or its owners) to file an annual return reporting the shares of income allocated to owners, and to provide each owner with a statement of allocated income to enable owners to report their shares of income on their own tax returns. In the United States, the statement of allocated income is known as a K-1 (or Schedule K-1).

Depending on the local tax regulations, this structure can avoid dividend tax and double taxation because only owners or investors are taxed on the revenue. Technically, for tax purposes, flow-through entities are considered "non-entities" because they are not taxed; rather, taxation "flows-through" to another tax return.

== Definitions ==
According to International Bureau of Fiscal Documentation (IBFD) a pass-through entity or flow-through entity (FTE) is a "non-taxable entity, such as a partnership, under which the income or expense is generally regarded as income or expense of the participants under the transparency principle." FTEs are based on conduit theory or pipeline theory which is defined as a "method of integrating the taxation at the entity and participator level under which income or deductions flow through from the entity to its participators. The entity is in effect regarded as an extension of the participators. A partnership is generally taxed according to the conduit system. The conduit system may be contrasted with the classical system."

== Types ==
In the United States, pass-through entities include "sole proprietorships, partnerships and S corporations that ... pay taxes at the individual rate of their owners" as well as income trusts and limited liability companies.

According to CNN Money, in the United States, most "businesses are set up as pass-throughs, not corporations" which "means their profits are passed through to the owners, shareholders and partners, who pay tax on them on their personal returns under ordinary income tax rates." In other words pass-through businesses are not "taxed like corporations and instead pay taxes on business income as if it were personal income."

=== Sole proprietorships ===
A sole proprietor is "someone who owns an unincorporated business by himself or herself." However, if one is the sole member of a domestic limited liability company (LLC), one is not a sole proprietor if one elects to treat the LLC as a corporation. In the United States, sole proprietors "must report all business income or losses on [their] personal income tax return; the business itself is not taxed separately. The IRS refers to this as "pass-through" taxation, because business profits pass through the business to be taxed on your personal tax return.

=== S corporation ===
S corporation shareholders are subject to tax on their "pro rata shares of income" based on their shareholdings in the S corporation which is not itself taxed.

=== Bond and bond option sales strategy (BOSS) ===
FTEs included in the 2009 IBFD International Tax Glossary included the Bond and Bond Option Sales Strategy (BOSS) transaction] referring to an "investment strategy developed in the United States to generate tax losses without a corresponding economic loss. The transaction involves the use of a partnership or other flow-through entity that makes an investment in a foreign corporation that is capitalized for the purpose of carrying out the transaction. Variants of Boss Transactions are referred to as Son of Boss Transactions.

== Chronology ==
According to a report published by Brookings in May 2017, in the early 1980s almost all business income in the United States was generated by C corporations. In terms of Income tax in the United States C corporations are taxed separately from their owners.

In December 2004 the Financial Asset Securitization Investment (FASIT) which was a flow-through entity formed in the United States, was repealed. FASIT was an investment instrument in "non-mortgage receivable pools such as credit card receivables, automobile loans, construction loans, and finance leases." FASITS in existence on October 24, 2004 were exempted from the repeal.

By 2005 the US Internal Revenue Service viewed Son of Boss as "an abusive transaction aggressively marketed in the late 1990s and 2000 primarily to wealthy individuals." The IRS began a "settlement initiative" which "required taxpayers to concede 100 percent of the claimed tax losses and pay a penalty of either 10 percent or 20 percent unless they previously disclosed the transactions to the IRS."

By 2013, "only 44 percent of the income of business owners was earned through C-corporations."

Starting in 2013, Kansas Governor Sam Brownback undertook what was described by The Atlantic in a June 2017 article as the United States' "most aggressive experiment in conservative economic policy". From 2013 to 2017, 300,000 businesses as pass-through income entities, benefited from the complete tax exemption. [T]ens of thousands of Kansans were able to "claim their wages and salaries as income from a business rather than from employment." Brownback's tax overhaul created pass-through income tax exemptions as well as trimming income tax, eliminating some corporate taxes. From 2013 to 2017, Kansas experienced budget shortfalls culminating in a $350 million budget shortfall in February 2017, which "threatened the viability of [the state's] schools and infrastructure". In response, in June 2017, the extreme tax cuts were rolled back to 2013 levels.

By 2017, pass-through businesses earned the "majority of business income" in the United States and "owners of S-corporations and partnerships now earn about half of all income from businesses."

According to a September 2017 article in The New York Times, about "95 percent of companies in the United States are structured as pass-through entities, generating the bulk of the government’s tax revenues."

On December 2, 2017 the U.S. Senate passed a tax overhaul bill as part of the proposed Tax Cuts and Jobs Act of 2017 that reduced taxes on pass-through business income by allowing them to "deduct 23% of their income". The Senate added features to the bill to prevent abuse. In a November article, The New York Times reported that the tax bill would "[r]educe the pass-through tax rate to 25% regardless of income level. Since 95% of businesses are incorporated as pass-through entities Examples include "sole proprietorships, partnerships and S corporations that currently pay taxes at the individual rate of their owners." whose owners pay taxes as if it were personal income at a much lower rate. This represents a large tax cut for owners that is capital as opposed to labor. Approximately the largest 2% of pass-through businesses represent 40% of pass-through income and today are taxed at 39.6%, the top individual rate."

== See also ==
- Sole proprietorship
