= Ensign Energy Services =

Canadian company that provides oilfield services

Ensign Energy Services Inc.
- Company type: Public
- Traded as: TSX: ESI
- Industry: Oil and Gas Equipment & Services
- Founded: 1987
- Headquarters: Calgary, Alberta, Canada
- Key people: N. Murray Edwards (Chairman)
- Services: Drilling; Directional Drilling; Well Servicing
- Number of employees: 5,000+ (2019)

Ensign Energy Services Inc. is a publicly traded Canadian company that provides oilfield services for the North American and international market. Founded in 1987, Ensign is headquartered in Calgary, Alberta. Ensign's Common Shares are publicly traded though the facilities of the Toronto Stock Exchange under the trading symbol ESI.

== Global Operations ==
Ensign is one of the world's land-based drilling and well servicing contractors serving crude oil, natural gas and geothermal operators. The company’s premium service is focused on contract drilling with complementary services such as directional drilling, underbalanced and managed pressure drilling, rental equipment, well servicing and production services. Today, the company owns 302 drilling rigs and 102 service rigs across the globe. It has more than 5,000 employees, the majority of whom are field-based.

North America

- United States
- Canada
- Mexico

South America

- Argentina
- Venezuela

Middle East

- United Arab Emirates
- Kuwait
- Oman
- Bahrain

Oceania

- Australia

== History ==
=== 1987 to 2007 ===
Ensign was founded in 1987 as Ensign Resource Service Group. It listed on the Toronto Stock Exchange in 1993. In the second quarter of 2005, the company changed its name from Ensign Resource Service Group to its current name.

=== 2008 to Present ===
In 2011, the company was accused of option backdating; it eventually reached a $4 million settlement. In 2015–2016, it experienced significant losses of $104 million and $150 million; in the 2009 to 2016 period, it closed down 200 rigs.

In August 2018, Ensign made a C$470 million hostile takeover offer for Trinidad Drilling. On November 27, 2018, Ensign announced the successful acquisition of a total of 66.73 per cent of the outstanding common shares of Trinidad Drilling Ltd. ("Trinidad"), including the 9.82 per cent previously held by Ensign, which increased to 89.3 per cent by December 21, 2018. The company reported a 72 per cent increase in revenue in its first full quarter since acquiring Trinidad Drilling Ltd.

In 2019, the company was awarded significant new drilling contracts in the United States, Canada and the Middle East.

== See also ==
- List of oilfield service companies
