= Enerplus =

Canadian oil and gas company

Enerplus Corporation
- Traded as: TSX: ERF; NYSE: ERF; S&P/TSX Composite Component
- Industry: Oil & Gas Drilling & Exploration
- Founder: Marcel Tremblay; John Brussa
- Headquarters: Calgary, Alberta, Canada
- Key people: Ian Dundas (CEO)
- Revenue: $1.29 billion (2018)
- Number of employees: ~400
- Website: www.enerplus.com

Enerplus Corporation is one of Canada’s largest independent oil and gas producers. It holds oil and natural gas property interest in the United States and in western Canada, in the provinces of Alberta, British Columbia and Saskatchewan.

Canada's first income fund, the firm is based in Calgary, Alberta and traded on both the Toronto Stock Exchange and the New York Stock Exchange before being acquired by Chord Energy.

== History ==
Enerplus was established in 1986 by Marcel Tremblay, a pension fund manager and John Brussa, a lawyer. It was originally called Enerplus Resources Fund, and it was Canada's first income trust. Its original purpose was to provide income from mature, aging oil and gas assets to retail investors, taking advantage of the tax advantages of the income trust structure. It started trading on the Toronto Stock Exchange in 1986 with a $10 million IPO.

In 1996, Mark Resources renamed itself Enermark, became an income trust, and joined the Enerplus group of companies. This was at the behest of Enerplus's then-CEO, Marcel Tremblay, in response to a hostile take-over attempt. In 2000, Enerplus merged with the Westrock Funds. In 2001, Enermark was merged into Enerplus. In 2004, it bought some of ChevronTexaco's western Canadian assets for $467 million. In 2005, Enerplus acquired American energy company Lyco Energy for $500 million, as part of an expansion strategy into the United States. Lyco held assets in South Dakota and Montana. This was the largest American acquisition by a Canadian oil and gas income trust to that time.

In 2008, Enerplus acquired Focus Energy Trust for $1.4 billion in stock. Focus unit-holders ended up owning 20% of the merged entity. Focus primarily specialized in natural gas production. In 2010, Enerplus sold their Kirby oilsands leases for $400 million, as a move of the company away from the oilsands. Around the same time, the company bought several properties in the Bakken formation in North Dakota for US$456 million.

Enerplus Corporation converted from an income trust to a corporate entity on January 1, 2011, after receiving approval by 98.5% of unitholders. This was done because of changes in the taxation rules for income trusts.

In 2016, Enerplus sold its Alberta natural gas properties for $193 million.

In 2024, it was announced that Enerplus would be acquired by Chord Energy for US$3.8 billion in cash and that its stock would be delisted from the TSX and NYSE. The acquisition was completed in June.

== Operations ==
As of 2015, Enerplus produced 110,800 barrels per day, 55% from natural gas, and 45% from crude oil and other liquids. 75% of production in the United States, and 25% is in Canada. It has three main areas of operation:

- The Williston basin: The company produces crude oil from properties in the Fort Berthold area of North Dakota. As of 2017, production was 30,000 barrels per day.
- The Marcellus region in Pennsylvania, where the company has shale gas assets, with a 2017 production of around 200 million cubic feet (5.7 million cubic metres) per day
- Southern Alberta and Saskatchewan, with 2016 crude oil production of 10,000 barrels per day

== See also ==
- Petroleum industry in Canada
- Canadian petroleum companies
