= Permian Basin Royalty Trust =

United States oil and natural gas royalty trust

- Company type: Public (NYSE: PBT)
- Industry: Oil and natural gas
- Founded: Fort Worth, Texas, United States (1980)
- Headquarters: Headquarters in Dallas, Texas; assets mostly in Crane County, Texas
- Key people: Ron E. Hooper, Vice President of Bank of America, N.A., Trustee
- Products: Oil and natural gas; royalty trust
- Website: Permian Basin Royalty Trust

The Permian Basin Royalty Trust (NYSE: PBT) is a United States oil and natural gas royalty trust based in Dallas, Texas. With a market capitalization of US $790,000,000, and an average daily trading volume of about 186,000 shares at the end of 2007, it was one of the largest royalty trusts in the United States. Its source of revenue is oil and gas pumped from the geologic formation for which it is named, the Permian Basin in west Texas, as well as a few locations in other parts of the state.

Most of the Trust's properties are on the Waddell Ranch in Crane County, Texas, where it owns a 75% net overriding royalty interest in the fee mineral interests (in this case, oil and natural gas). Other properties of the trust are in 32 other Texas counties, most of which are in the western portion of the state, on the High Plains; the trust owns a 95% net overriding royalty interest in all of its properties outside of the Waddell Ranch.

The principal productive zones for oil on the Waddell Ranch are in two geologic units, the Grayburg and the San Andreas, at a depth of from 2,800 to 3,400 feet (1,000 m) below ground surface; however there are a total of 12 producing zones on the ranch, including one at a depth of 10,600 feet (3,200 m). As of the end of 2006, there were a total of 800 operational and productive oil wells and 205 natural gas wells on the Waddell Ranch in the Trust. On December 31, 2006, the Trust claimed a lifetime of approximately 8.3 years for all mineral reserves of the Trust.

Permin Basin Royalty Trust came into being in November 1980, with an agreement between Southland Royalty Company and the First National Bank of Fort Worth. As is the case with U.S. royalty trusts, the trust cannot function as a business, and has no employees; all operations and maintenance are carried out by the Trustee and its subcontractors. Currently, the assets of the Trust are managed by ConocoPhillips, which acquired Meridian Oil, the previous operator. Meridian changed its name to Burlington Resources Oil and Gas Company, LP, in 1996, prior to being acquired by ConocoPhillips in 2006.

The Trust pays a relatively high dividend, yielding an annual rate of 12.4% in early 2008; in addition, it pays out monthly, a relative rarity for U.S. stocks. However, its distribution is dependent on the prices of oil and gas; thus, unlike traditional stocks (who, when declaring a dividend, usually maintain it at the same amount for each quarter of the year), the dividend payout will differ each month.

Since the Trust's assets are considered a depletable resource, its dividend payments are not taxed at the regular dividend rate, but rather as return of capital instead of return on investment; this is an additional tax advantage in the United States, and applies to all royalty trusts.
