= Return of capital =

Principal payments to shareholders

Return of capital (ROC) refers to principal payments back to "capital owners" (shareholders, partners, unitholders) that exceed the growth (net income/taxable income) of a business or investment. It should not be confused with Rate of Return (ROR), which measures a gain or loss on an investment. It is essentially a return of some or all of the initial investment, which reduces the basis on that investment.

ROC effectively shrinks the firm's equity in the same way that all distributions do. It is a transfer of value from the company to the owner. In an efficient market, the stock's price will fall by an amount equal to the distribution. Most public companies pay out only a percentage of their income as dividends. In some industries it is common to pay ROC.

- Real Estate Investment Trusts (REITs) commonly make distributions equal to the sum of their income and the depreciation (capital cost allowance) allowed for in the calculation of that income. The business has the cash to make the distribution because depreciation is a non-cash charge.
- Oil and gas royalty trusts also make distributions that include ROC equal to the drawdown in the quantity of their reserves. Again, the cash to find the O&G was spent previously, and current operations are generating excess cash.
- Private businesses can distribute any amount of equity that the owners need personally.
- Structured Products (closed ended investment funds) frequently use high distributions, that include returns of capital, as a promotional tool. The retail investors these funds are sold to rarely have the technical knowledge to distinguish income from ROC.
- Public business may return capital as a means to increase the debt/equity ratio and increase their leverage (risk profile). When the value of real estate holdings (for example) have increased, the owners may realize some of the increased value immediately by taking a ROC and increasing debt. This may be considered analogous to cash out refinancing of a residential property.
- When companies spin off divisions and issue shares of a new, stand-alone business, this distribution is a return of capital.

== Tax consequences ==
There will be tax consequences that are specific to individual countries. As examples only:

- Governments may want to prevent the shrinking of the business base of their economy, so they may tax withdrawals of capital.
- Governments may want to stimulate the exploration for O&G. They may allow companies to "flow-through" the exploration expense to the shareholders so it can be redeployed.
- REITs may also flow through the depreciation expense they do not need to shareholders. It may be decades before the property is sold and taxes payable. It is better to give the excess cash and the tax write-off to the shareholders.
- Since the ROC shrinks the business and represents a return of the investors' own money, the ROC payment received may not be taxed as income. Instead it may reduce the cost base of the asset. This results in higher capital gains when the asset is sold, but defers tax.

== Conclusions ==
- Cash flows do not measure income. They measure only cash flows.
- Depreciation, depletion and amortization cannot be ignored as "non-cash expenses". They are valid allocations of a one-time cash flow over the time period that the asset helps generate revenues.
- In the process of normalizing rates of return between different investment opportunities, ROC should not be included in the consideration of 'income' or 'dividends'.

== Time value of money ==
Some critics dismiss ROC or treat it as income, with the argument that the full cash is received and reinvested by the business or by the shareholder receiving it. It thereby generates more income and compounds. Therefore, ROC is not a "real" expense.

== See also ==
- Recovery of capital doctrine
- Return on capital
