= Precision Drilling =

Largest drilling rig contractor in Canada

Precision Drilling Corporation
- Type: Public
- Traded as: TSX: PD NYSE: PDS
- Industry: Oil Well Services
- Genre: Oilfield services company
- Founded: 1951
- Headquarters: Calgary, Alberta, Canada
- Key people: CEO: Carey P. Ford
- Products: Oil field services and rentals
- Revenue: $1.93 billion CAD (2023)
- Number of employees: 4,469 (2019)
- Website: www.precisiondrilling.com

Precision Drilling Corporation is the largest drilling rig contractor in Canada, also providing oil field rental and supplies.

== History ==
Precision Drilling Ltd. was founded in 1951.

In 1987, Precision Drilling was acquired by Cypress Drilling, led by president Hank Swartout, in a reverse takeover which left the company with a fleet of 19 rigs. Swartout led the company through extensive growth until his retirement in 2007.

In 2005, Precision sold its energy services and international contract-drilling divisions to Weatherford International for $2.28 billion and reorganized as an income trust. Precision converted from an income trust back to a corporation in 2010.

In 2008, Precision acquired its US rival Grey Wolf Inc. for $2 billion, a merger which expanded its rig count in the US, which it had largely left in 2005, over tenfold. The acquisition led to financial difficulties which led to a $330M CAD investment by the Alberta Investment Management Corporation (AIMCo) in 2009, characterized by Maclean's as a bailout. AIMCo divested its stake in 2013.

In 2018, Precision attempted to purchase Trinidad Drilling with over $1B CAD of shares as a white knight, opposing the cash bid of competitor Ensign Energy Services, however a drop in Precision's share price and thus bid value resulted in Ensign's bid prevailing.

In September 2019, amid a difficult energy sector in Alberta, Precision Drilling Corporation's share price fell below the required minimum for the S&P/TSX Composite Index and was removed from the index.

In July 2022, Precision Drilling acquired High Arctic Energy Services Inc.'s welling services and rental divisions for $29.3 million.

== Global fleet ==
In December 2023, Precision had 97 land drilling rigs in Canada (25% of total 386), 104 in the US (9% of total Super-Spec land drilling rigs), and 13 among Kuwait, Saudi Arabia, Iraqi Kurdistan, and Georgia.

== See also ==
- List of oilfield service companies
