= ARC Energy =

Advanced Renewable Energy Company LLC
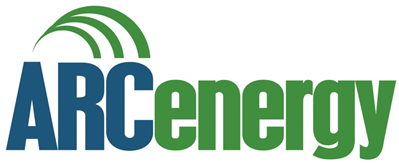
- Company type: LLC
- Industry: Sapphire, Mobile screens, LED, equipment manufacturing
- Founded: 2007
- Headquarters: Nashua, New Hampshire
- Key people: Kedar Gupta (CEO), Rick Schwerdtfeger (CTO)
- Products: CHES Furnaces
- Website: www.arc-energy.com

Advanced Renewable Energy Company LLC (ARC Energy) was a New Hampshire-based technology company that specializes in manufacturing sapphire growth furnaces and semiconductor scale technologies for the semiconductor and LED industries. It stopped doing business in 2016

== History ==
ARC Energy was founded in 2007 by Kedar Gupta and Rick Schwerdtfeger.

President Barack Obama visited ARC Energy on February 2, 2010. He touted ARC Energy in his speech at Nashua North High School later that same day, "That is why jobs will be our number one focus in 2010. And we’re going to start where most new jobs do – with small businesses. These are the companies that begin in basements and garages when an entrepreneur takes a chance on his dream, or a worker decides it’s time she became her own boss. They’re companies like ARC Energy, which I visited earlier today. These folks are hard at work on a new manufacturing process for ultra-efficient LED lights that will make them affordable for ordinary people. The technology they’ve created is the only of its kind in the world. They’re this little business in a condo out on Amherst Street, and they have the potential to revolutionize an industry. Right here in Nashua."

ARC Energy was visited by U.S. Commerce Secretary Gary Locke January 27, 2011 and discussed how a more competitive America will help rebuild the economy, create more jobs and prepare the country for challenges ahead.

From the time of President Obama's visit to Gary Locke's visit ARC Energy signed several hundred million dollars' worth of contracts and expanded its workforce over 300 percent.

In August 2015, ARC Energy became the first company to report repeatable growth of 300 kilogram Sapphire single crystals, having produced the first 300 kg crystal in April 2015, followed by the second one in July 2015 following the same semi-automated and repeatable process parameters.

== Operations ==
ARC Energy developed a sapphire crystal "c-axis" growth technology specifically for LED applications, called CHES (Controlled Heat Extraction System). CHES Furnaces enable substrate manufacturers to produce large diameter (4", 6", 8", 10" and larger), LED-quality sapphire for mass production.

ARC Energy also offers turnkey sapphire production solutions that include setup and installation, training, material handling, inspection, core fabrication and material recycling.
