= Obsidian Energy =

Canadian oil and natural gas company

Obsidian Energy Ltd.
- Trade name: Obsidian Energy Ltd
- Type: Public
- Traded as: TSX: OBE
- Industry: Oil and natural gas
- Founded: Calgary, Alberta, Canada (1979)
- Headquarters: Headquarters in Calgary; oil and gas wells throughout western Canada
- Key people: David L. French (CEO, 2016–19)
- Products: Oil and natural gas
- Number of employees: 300 (2017)
- Website: www.obsidianenergy.com

Obsidian Energy Ltd. (previously known as Penn West Exploration Ltd., Penn West Petroleum and Penn West Energy Trust) is a mid-sized Canadian oil and natural gas production company based in Calgary, Alberta.

For a while it was one of the S&P/TSX 60, the sixty largest companies on the Toronto Stock Exchange. From 2005–2011 it was a Canadian royalty trust (CANROY), and reached a peak market capitalization in January 2008 of approximately US $9.5 billion. In the 2012 Forbes Global 2000, Penn West Petroleum, Obsidian Energy's predecessor, was ranked as the 1086th largest public company in the world.

The company experienced operational and financial difficulties when crude oil prices fell significantly in 2014. As a result, the company underwent a significant restructuring with the majority of the assets sold over the next two years to reduce debt.

Obsidian's oil and gas fields are located in Alberta, along the Western Canadian Sedimentary Basin, a region which is one of the world's largest petroleum reserves. Production comes from three key areas in Alberta: the Pembina Cardium, the Peace River oil sands, and the Alberta Viking. Total production in 2017 is expected to average approximately 31,000 bbl equivalent per day.

On 26 June 2017, Penn West Petroleum changed its name to Obsidian Energy.

== Current operations ==
The formal name change from Penn West Petroleum Ltd. (TSX – PWT; NYSE – PWE) to Obsidian Energy Ltd. (TSX – OBE; NYSE – OBE) took place on June 26, 2017 at the shareholders meeting. The board of directors was elected with David L. French as CEO and board members including George H. Brookman, John Brydson, Raymond D. Crossley, David L. French, William A. Friley, Richard L. George, Maureen Cormier Jackson, and Jay W. Thornton.

In 2017, the 2017 Capex budget for Obsidian was C$160 million. In spite of the pressure from the low price of oil in general and the record low prices of Canada's heavy oil, benchmark Western Canadian Select (WCS), which is complicated by the lack of pipeline capacity, Obsidian's is "heavily weighted towards gas which resulted in relatively small impact from WCS differentials".

By December 2017, Obsidian set a target production for 2018 at 31,500 boe/d. with heavy oil accounting for about 20% of Obisidian's production. Obsidian's heavy oil, because of its specifications, has a bigger discount than the benchmark Western Canadian Select (WCS).

== History ==
In 1995 Penn West, then an independent exploration and production company called Penn West Petroleum Ltd, was the operator and licensee of a well in Saddle Hills Field, Alberta, where they held rights to an entire DSU.

In May 2005, Penn West under the new trade name "Penn West Energy Trust" operated as a Canadian royalty trust (CANROY). According to a 2004 article in The New York Times, the Canadian royalty trusts (CANROY) were "much larger, both in production and in market capitalization", than those in the United States. They produce about 11 percent of the oil and 23 percent of the natural gas in Canada and have a combined market capitalization of 34 billion Canadian dollars, or about $27 billion." (Note: This was an entity which pays the majority of its earnings directly to shareholders (known as "unitholders" in a trust), in the form of dividends.) Penn West was already one of the top ten Canadian oil and gas companies in terms of after tax profits from 2003 through 2007. (Note: 1. EnCana 2.36B (2003) and 3.96B (2007); Imperial Oil 1.71B (2003) 3.19B (2007); 3. Husky Energy 1.33B (2003) 3.21B (2007) 4. Suncor Energy 1.09B (2003) 1.08 1.16 2.97 2.83B (2007); 5. Petro-Canada 1.65B (2003) 2.73B (2007); Canadian Natural Resources 1.40B (2003) 2.61B (2007); Talisman Energy 0.98B (2003) 2.08B (2007); Nexen 0.58B (2003) 1.09B (2007); Canadian Oil Sands Trust 0.31B (2003) 0.74B (2007); 10. Penn West Energy Trust 0.45B (2003) 0.18B (2007)) Penn West Petroleum (PWT) was a Canadian royalty trust (CANROY) from 2005–2011, and as such did not pay federal income taxes.

Calgary-based Penn West Energy Trust acquired publicly-traded trust companies—Petrofund Energy Trust in June 2006, Canetic Resources Trust, a "smaller rival" for $3.6-billion in 2007, Vault Energy Trust in January 2008, and Endev Energy Inc. in July 2008. According to a 2007 CBC News article, Penn West became the largest oil and gas energy trust in North America after its acquisition of Canetic.

On January 1, 2011, the government cracked down on Penn West, one of a group of oil and gas producers, who from 2005 to 2011, through Canadian royalty trusts (CANROYs), did not pay "federal income taxes if they distributed their income to shareholders." (Note: Domash: "The resulting double-digit dividend yields grabbed dividend investors’ attention in the mid-2000s. Eventually the government cracked down and starting in 2011, trusts were required to pay the same taxes as regular corporations. Consequently, all trusts converted to corporations, and many cut their dividends") (Note: Penn West, Advantage, ARC Energy, Baytex Energy, Bonavista Energy, Bonterra, Canadian Oil Sands, Crescent Point Energy, Daylight Resources, Enerplus Resources, Enterra, Fairborne Energy, Freehold Royalty, NAL Oil & Gas, Paramount, Pengrowth, Peyto Energy, Progress Energy, Provident Energy, Trilogy, Vermillion Energy and Zargon Energy all benefited from Canadian royalty trusts (CANROYs).)

In response to the government crackdown, in January 2011, Penn West converted from a CANROY to a conventional corporation, a "newly-incorporated entity named Penn West Petroleum Ltd." (Note: CBR:"Unit holders of the Trust exchanged their units on a one-for-one basis into the common shares of a newly-incorporated entity named Penn West Petroleum Ltd. The new entity had, as part of the arrangement, amalgamated with an entity holding the assets of the Trust.") From 2012 to June 2014, Penn West cut back its work force by almost 50%.

The 2013 CBR company listings reported that by 2012, Penn West Petroleum Ltd. was operated as Penn West Exploration, "engaged in the business of acquiring, developing, exploiting and holding interests in petroleum and natural gas properties and assets". The board of directors in the fiscal year 2013 included David E. Roberts as President & CEO and David A. Dyck as Senior Vice President & CFO. In July 2014, Dyck had discovered and reported irregularities in the company's accounting practices that "misclassified nearly $300-million in expenses."

Penn West reported that preliminary findings revealed irregularities totaling "$381-million in 2013 and 2012." Penn West notified Canadian and U.S. regulators about the irregularities and expanded their own investigation to review results going back to 2007. Lawsuits tied to the accounting irregularities include those in Canada and a class action lawsuit in the United States. According to CBC News, by the end of July 2014, independent auditors contracted by Penn West to review its books uncovered that "$70 million worth of operating expenses that were reclassified as capital expenditures on things like property, plant and equipment in fiscal 2013; $110 million of similar expenses incorrectly classified in fiscal 2012; $100 million in operating expenses that were incorrectly reclassified as royalty expense" in 2012 and 2013. The 2012, 2013, and 2014 financial statements were audited by KPMG who were replaced by Ernst & Young (EY) for the audit of the 2015 financial statements.

Penn West's profit in the second quarter of 2014 was $143-million, or 29 cents per share. Rick George who was Suncor's CEO from 1991 to 2012, served as Penn West's CEO from 2013 to 2014. The company laid off 1350 of its 2350 employees since Dave Roberts became CEO.

According to a May 2015 CBC News article, at their May 2015 annual general meeting, Penn West's chair, Richard George, reassured shareholders of the company's viability in spite of a drop of 80% in the value of their shares in 2014/2015 as it struggled with low WTI benchmark prices of $60 US a barrel. At that time the company was facing "six different lawsuits from investors in Canada and one consolidated lawsuit in the United States." In response to the decline in oil prices, on September 2, 2015, Penn West announced cuts of about 400 full-time employees and contractors mainly from the company's headquarters in Calgary which represents 35 per cent of the total workforce at Penn West. Penn West also suspended "dividend payments to its shareholders after its next payment in October [2015] and reduc[ed] compensation for its board of directors."

== Deep disposal well and Peace River earthquakes ==
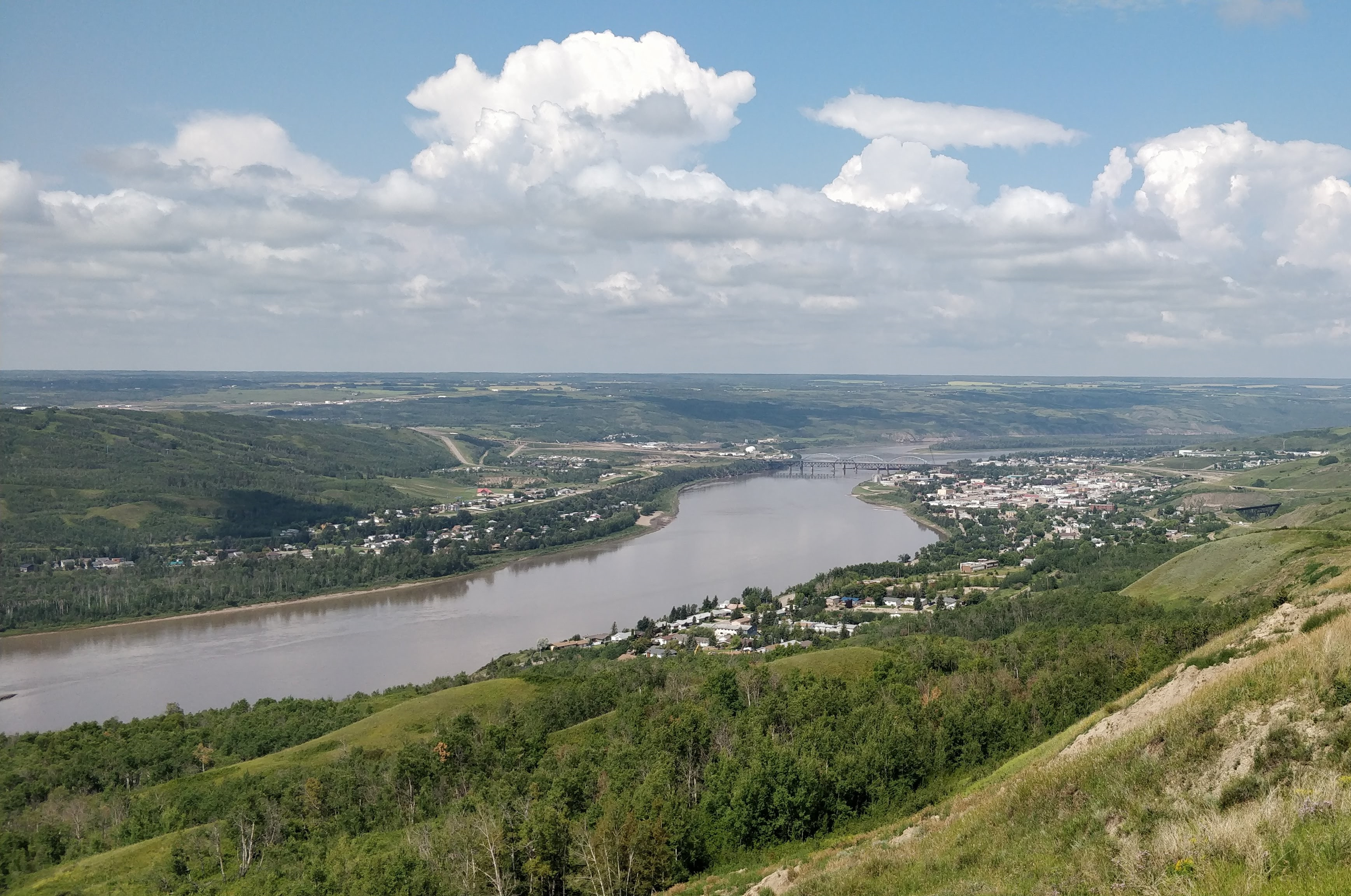
3 earthquakes 40 kilometres (25 mi) southeast of the town of Peace River

On March 23, 2023, the Alberta Energy Regulator (AER) issued an environmental protection order to Obsidian following months of investigation into three earthquakes that occurred near Obsidian's deep disposal injection well 40 kilometres (25 mi) southeast of Peace River Peace River, Alberta, a town of 6,000 in northwest Alberta. The magnitude of the first earthquake was 5.6, the second on March 9, 2023—which was more shallow—was a magnitude 3.2, and the third on a March 16, which occurred near the site of the first earthquake, was a magnitude 5. A timeline released in late March, conducted by AER's Geological Survey (AGS), says that there was a "clear" connection between the cluster of "large, felt seismicity" and the deep well disposal injections into the Leduc Formation. AGS scientists said that this recurrence of earthquakes is more typical of "induced"—as opposed to natural—seismicity. The AGS timeline was informed by scientific data about aftershocks and underground strata collected from sensors placed around the earthquake sites. A third party analysed this data. Further evidence, confirming the AGS timeline, was also collected through independent research undertaken by a team of seismologists from Stanford University, the University of Alberta and Natural Resources Canada.
