= BP Prudhoe Bay Royalty Trust =

American oil and natural gas royalty trust

- Company type: Public
- Traded as: NYSE: BPT
- Industry: Oil and natural gas
- Founded: New York, New York, United States (February 28, 1989; 37 years ago)
- Headquarters: Headquarters in New York; assets on the Alaska North Slope at the Prudhoe Bay Oil Field
- Key people: Bob Dudley (CEO); Marie Trimboli, Assistant Vice President, Bank of New York (trustee)
- Products: Oil and natural gas; royalty trust
- Website: bpt.q4web.com

The BP Prudhoe Bay Royalty Trust is a United States oil and natural gas royalty trust based in New York, New York. With a market capitalization of US$155 million in early 2020, and an average trading volume of 322,000 shares, BP Prudhoe Bay Royalty Trust is the largest conventional oil and gas trust in the United States. Its assets are in the huge Prudhoe Bay Oil Field, the largest oil field in North America, and at the end of 2006 the trust claimed to have proved reserves of 85.1 million barrels of crude oil. As of the end of 2018, the trust claimed to have proved reserves of 15.77 million barrels of crude oil.

Standard Oil Company and BP Exploration, both now branches of British Petroleum, set up the trust on February 28, 1989. They distribute royalties on a portion of the oil produced from the Prudhoe Bay Oil Field, typically 16.4246% of the first 90,000 barrels of net daily production. In their 2018 annual report, the trust estimated it would continue to make royalty payouts through the year 2022.

Royalty trusts typically pay enormous dividends by Wall Street standards, making them popular with investors, particularly during times when the price of oil is high, or other market sectors are performing poorly. Investing advice firm Motley Fool listed the trust in the top four dividend payers of the decade from 1997 to 2007, giving a total return on investment during that time of 1,369%. In early 2008, the trust's quarterly dividend per share was $3.05, which equated to an annual payout of approximately 16%. It pays its dividend quarterly, unlike many of the royalty trusts, which pay monthly. Unanticipated oilfield mishaps can occasionally cause volatility of the stock price, as happened in August 2006, when BP needed to shut down its operations at Prudhoe Bay to replace 22 miles (35 km) of corroded lines. The BP Prudhoe Bay Royalty Trust sued BP over its poor maintenance practices and reached a settlement of $29,469,081. The shutdown only affected one dividend payment, which was subsequently made up for with the settlement.
