= Canadian Oil Sands =

Canadian company

Canadian Oil Sands Limited
- Type: Subsidiary
- Industry: Energy
- Founded: 1978
- Defunct: 2016
- Fate: Acquired by Suncor Energy
- Headquarters: Calgary
- Key people: Ryan M. Kubik (CEO)
- Revenue: ▼3.912 billion CAD (2014)
- Net income: ▼440 million CAD (2014)
- Parent: Suncor Energy
- Website: www.cdnoilsands.com

Canadian Oil Sands Limited was a Canadian company that generated income from its oil sands investment in the Syncrude Joint Venture. Syncrude operated an oil sands facility and produced crude oil through the mining of oil sands from ore deposits in the Athabasca region of northern Alberta, Canada.

In 2016, Suncor Energy purchased all of the shares of Canadian Oil Sands Limited.

== History ==
In 1978, Syncrude produced its first barrel of oil.

PanCanadian Petroleum (later Encana, now Ovintiv) formed Canadian Oil Sands Trust in 1995 with a 10% interest in Syncrude. The following year, Gulf Canada formed Athabasca Oil Sands Trust with an 11.74% interest in Syncrude. Canadian Oil Sands Trust and Athabasca Oil Sands Trust merged in 2001, continuing as Canadian Oil Sands Trust. Canadian Oil Sands Trust increased its interest in Syncrude to 35.5% in 2003. A further purchase of a 1.25% incremental interest brought the trust's interest in Syncrude to its current level of 36.74%. Other investors with a significant shareholding in Syncrude are Suncor Energy Inc., Imperial Oil Ltd., and two major Chinese oil outfits. The trust is reliant on Syncrude for its income, while its partners have other investments.

In 2011, Canadian Oil Sands Trust converted from a royalty trust to a corporation, becoming Canadian Oil Sands Limited.

In October 2015, the company was subject to a hostile takeover bid from Suncor Energy, worth around $3.29 billion. The bid followed rejected advances earlier in the year in March and April.

On March 21, 2016 Suncor Energy completed acquisition of Canadian Oil Sands with the support of the Boards of Directors of both companies. The total aggregate transaction value was approximately $6.6 billion including company's estimated debt of $2.4 billion Their former website now redirects to Suncor Energy's site.

== Operations ==
Canadian Oil Sands' primary business operation was through its 36.74 per cent interest in Syncrude.

The company also held some arctic natural gas interests through a wholly owned subsidiary, Canadian Arctic Gas Limited.

The corporate head office was located in Calgary, Alberta.
