= Vancouverism =

Urban planning philosophy

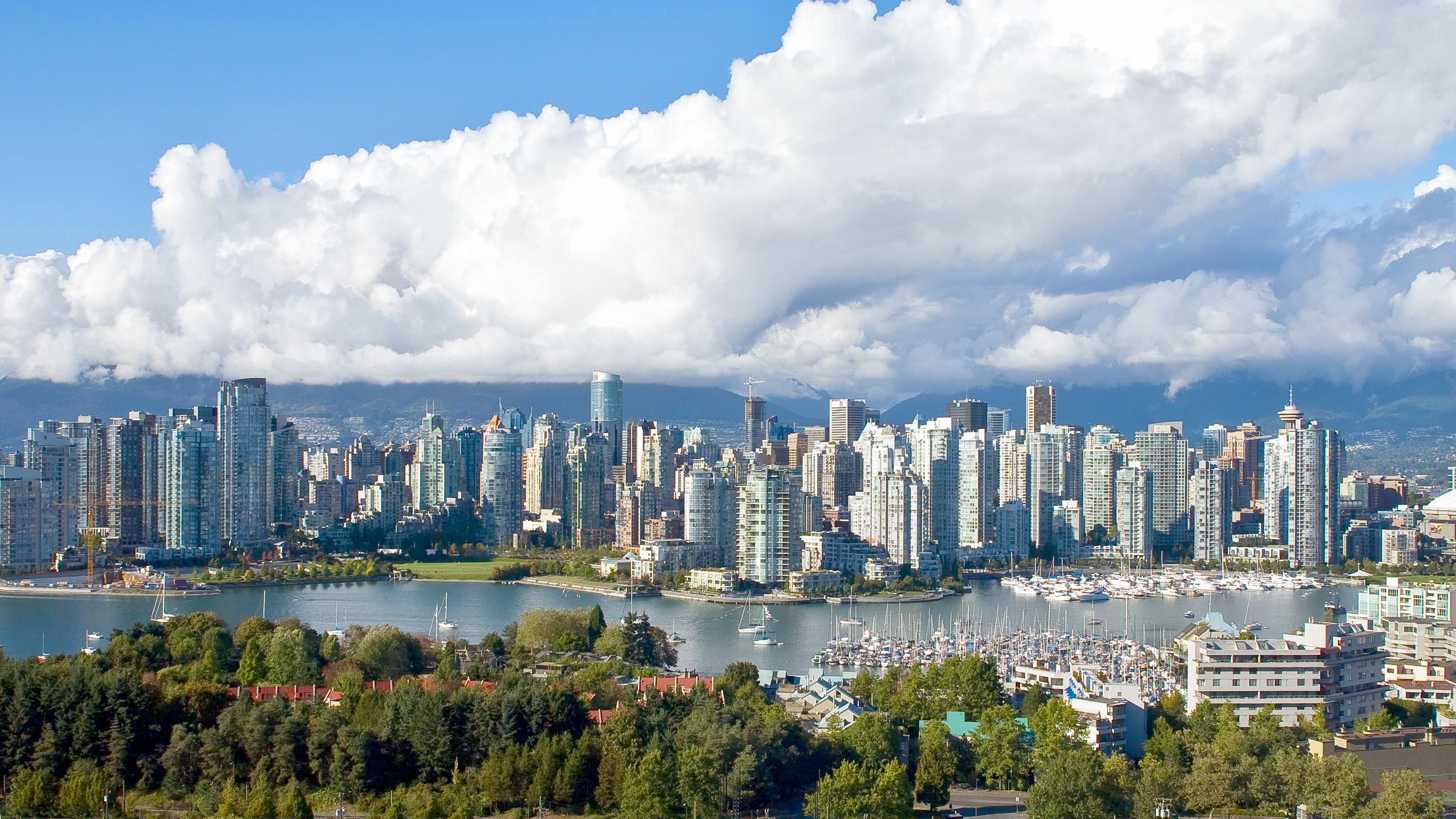
Vancouver skyline in June 2015, dominated by residential high-rises.

Vancouverism is an urban planning and architectural philosophy characterized by a large residential population living in the city centre in mixed-use developments, typically narrow, high-rise residential towers atop a wide, medium-height commercial base. It focuses on the reliance of mass public transit, the creation and maintenance of green spaces, and the preservation of view corridors. Vancouverism originates in its namesake city of Vancouver in British Columbia, Canada, and began as a means of addressing the city's expensive housing market while also decreasing the city's car dependency and improving city livability in and around the centre.

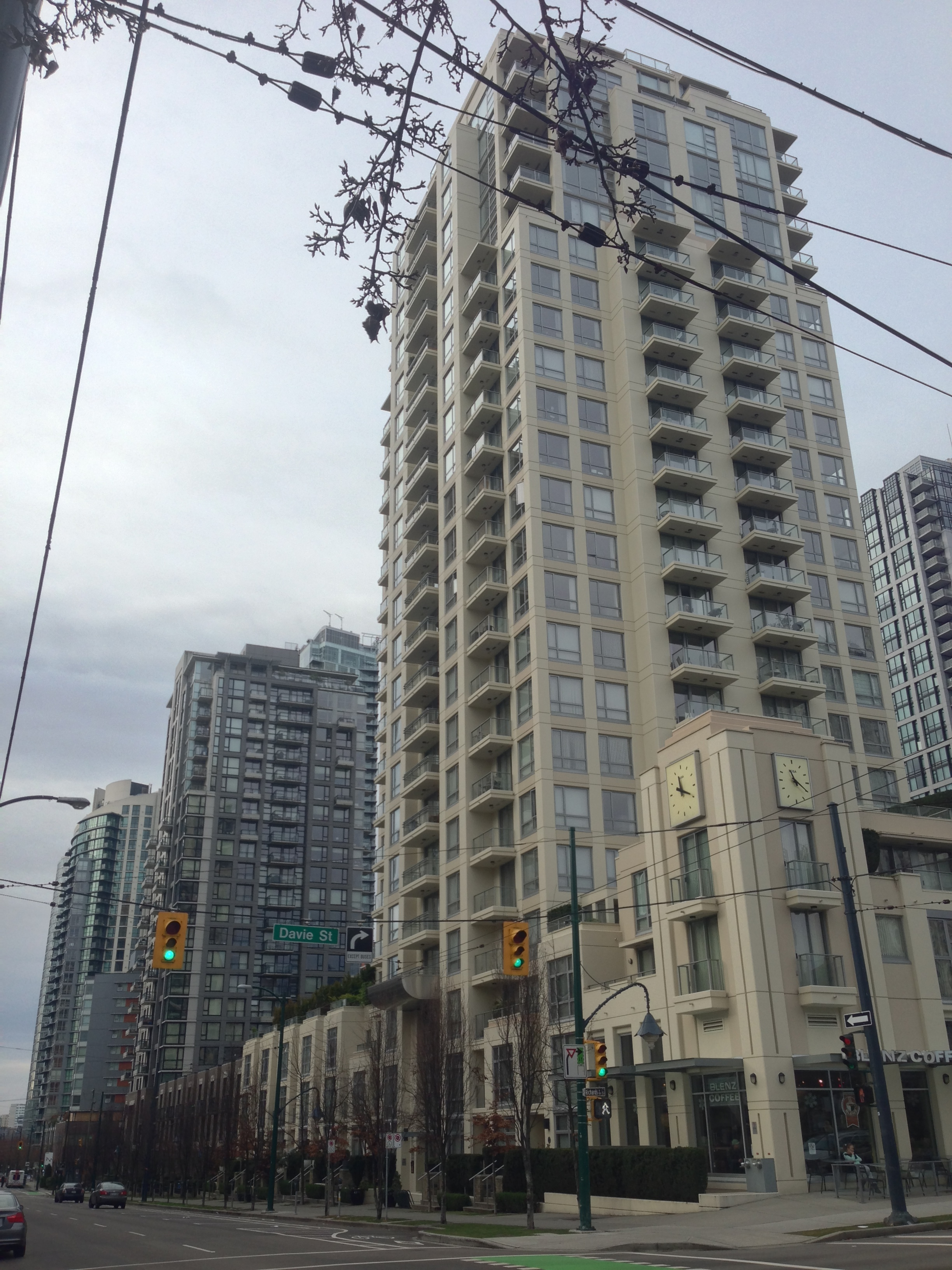
Vancouverism high-rises often sit on top of a commercial or residential podium.

Vancouverism consists of rapid and expansive residential and commercial developments, often with direct or close access to mass public transit, typically metro. Generally, the first few floors contain commercial space for business and offices that completely fill the plot, with some single-family townhouses constructed above. A narrow high-rise, or in lower-density areas a mid-rise tower is built above the initial structure, set back from the street; the narrow width allows additional light and air flow between the building to reach more units, and the set-back allows for private spaces such as a pool or green space for residents, and prevents shadows completely blocking the streets.

The philosophy of Vancouverism allows for cities to account for rapidly growing populations by providing housing directly in or near the city centre, as well as helping to provide affordable housing to address high housing costs or a lack of housing. When built around mass public transit, it can allow for cities to further develop such networks, providing higher ridership from residents and workers of the towers.

However, concerns have been raised over the strategy; such sudden and rapid developments, while beneficial for higher income groups, can price out existing residents and contributing to gentrification of a city. Their developments can also suffer from corruption by companies or local officials, possible money-laundering schemes, and lack of transparency and public engagement on such projects. Additionally, these projects can greatly reshape the skyline of an area, with concerns in lower-density residential neighborhoods over the shadows cast by high-rises.

== Background ==
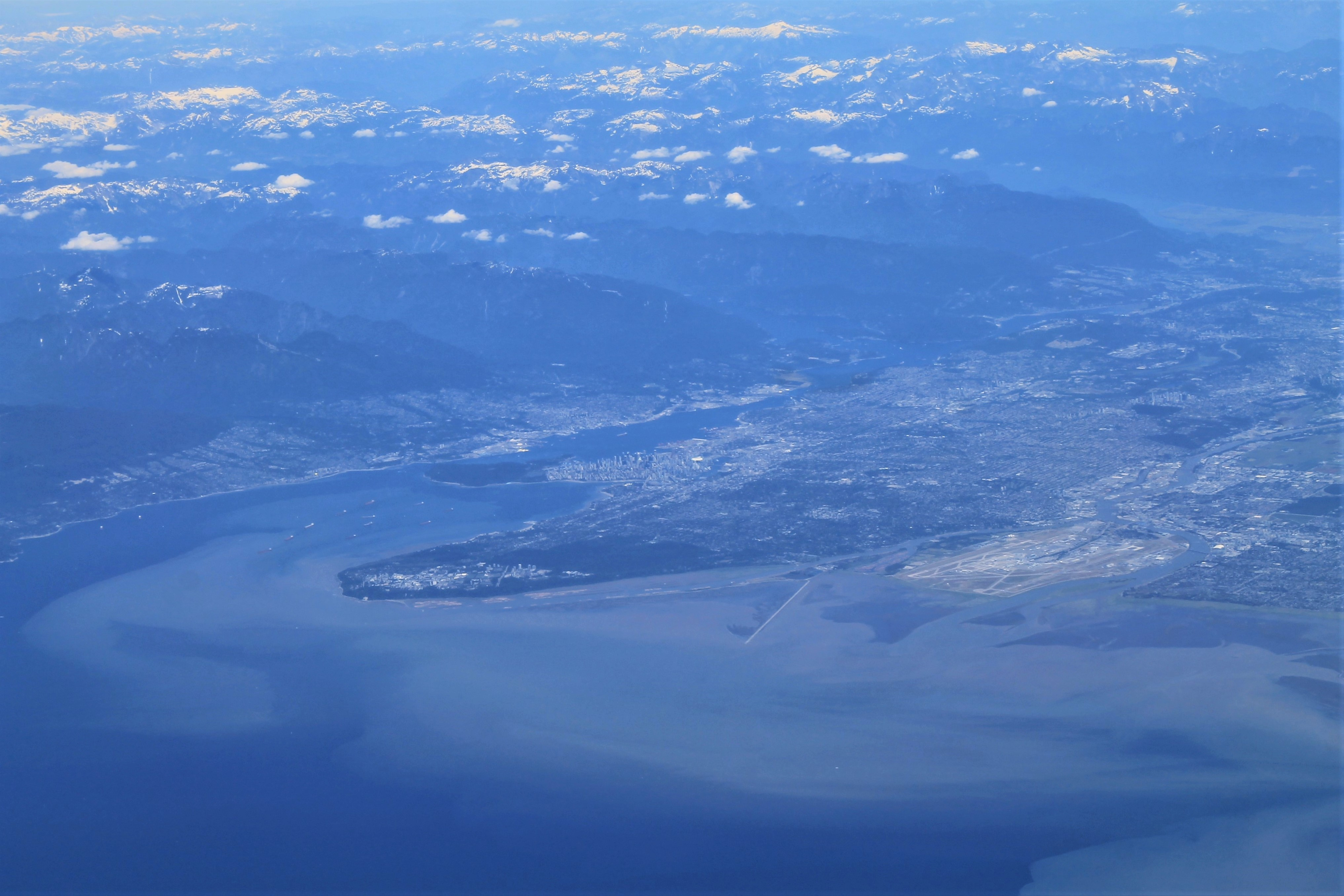
The Vancouver metropolitan area as seen in 2018; note the Strait of Georgia in the lower foreground and the North Shore Mountains in the upper background.

Vancouverism developed in part as a product of Vancouver's geographical context. Wedged between the Strait of Georgia, the North Shore mountains, and the border with the United States, the Metro Vancouver Regional District partnered with the Fraser Valley municipalities to encourage controlled development. Early recognition that British Columbia's farmland would be engulfed by urban sprawl led to the establishment of the Agricultural Land Reserve in the 1970s, which assisted in containing and intensifying development throughout the metro Vancouver area.

Architect Arthur Erickson is credited by some with developing the concept of Vancouverism in the mid 1950s in a development called "Project 56"; although this development was never realized, many of the mixed-use principles were incorporated into the development of the West End. The city's planning department, under the direction of Ray Spaxman in the 1980s, began to expand on the concepts, many of which were brought into fruition with the development of the former Expo 86 lands along False Creek and Yaletown. Journalist Jane Jacobs also contributed to this concept in her book The Death and Life of Great American Cities, where she outlined many of the concepts of Vancouverism.

== Aesthetics ==
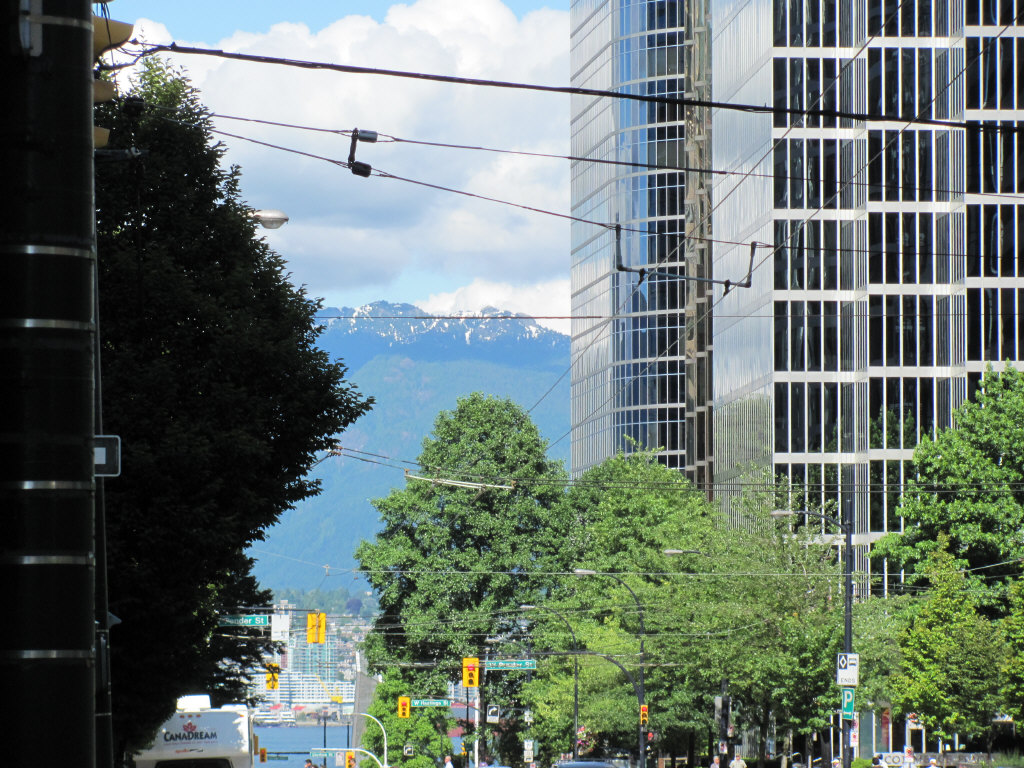
Example of a view corridor in Vancouver, showing an open view of the North Shore Mountains.

One principle aesthetic of Vancouverism, as evidensed by planning policy, involves protecting view corridors. Vancouver's "View Protection Guidelines" were approved in 1989 and amended in 1990, establishing height limits to protect views of the North Shore Mountains. This approach, while credited with preserving the city's scenic backdrop, has also been criticised for lessening visual interest and failing to represent the city's contemporary image. In response, the Vancouver City Council commissioned a study of its skyline in 1997, concluding that Vancouver's skyline would benefit from the addition of a handful of taller buildings through their additional visual interest.

Modern, residential high-rises are another aesthetic of Vancouverism, often featuring large glass features, hundreds of stacked decks, and green roofs. Furthermore, green spaces are widely integrated into a city in Vancouverism, and public spaces are often designed to maximise their space as well.

== Densification and walkability ==
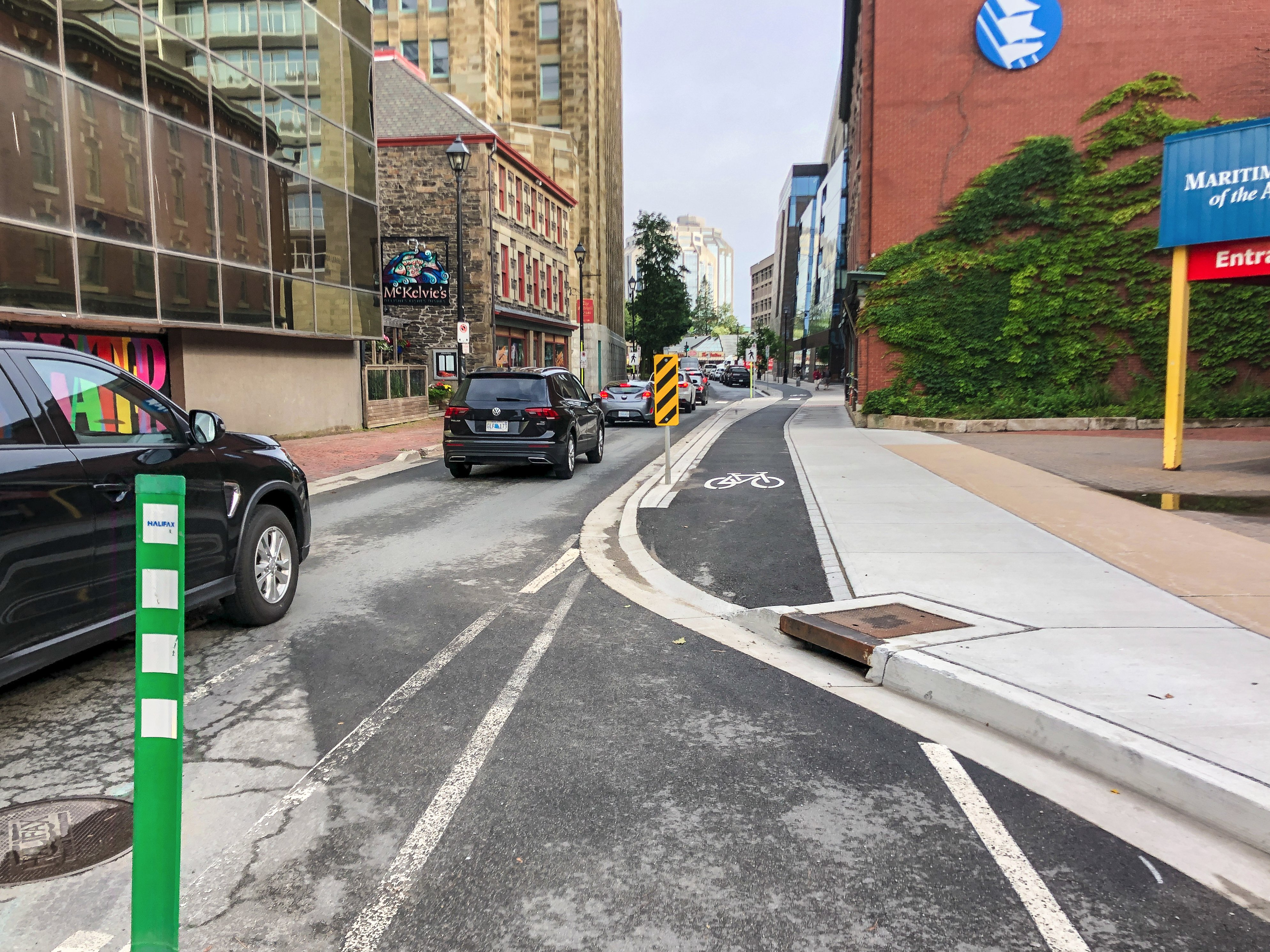
A narrow street with dedicated bike path in the urban centre of Hallifax, Nova Scotia, Canada.

Due to the mixed-use nature of Vancouverism, the philosophy inherently hinges on, and contributes to, the walkability of its city. The greater density of residents and commercial destinations results in generally closer destinations, as well as higher volumes of pedestrian traffic within the area. This is generally done through redesigning streets to account for the greater amount of mixed local and regional vehicle, bike, and pedestrian, many developments have elements such as narrowed streets, widened sidewalks, protected bike paths, and separate vehicle routes intended to circumvent the city or to encourage the use of bikes or public transit instead.

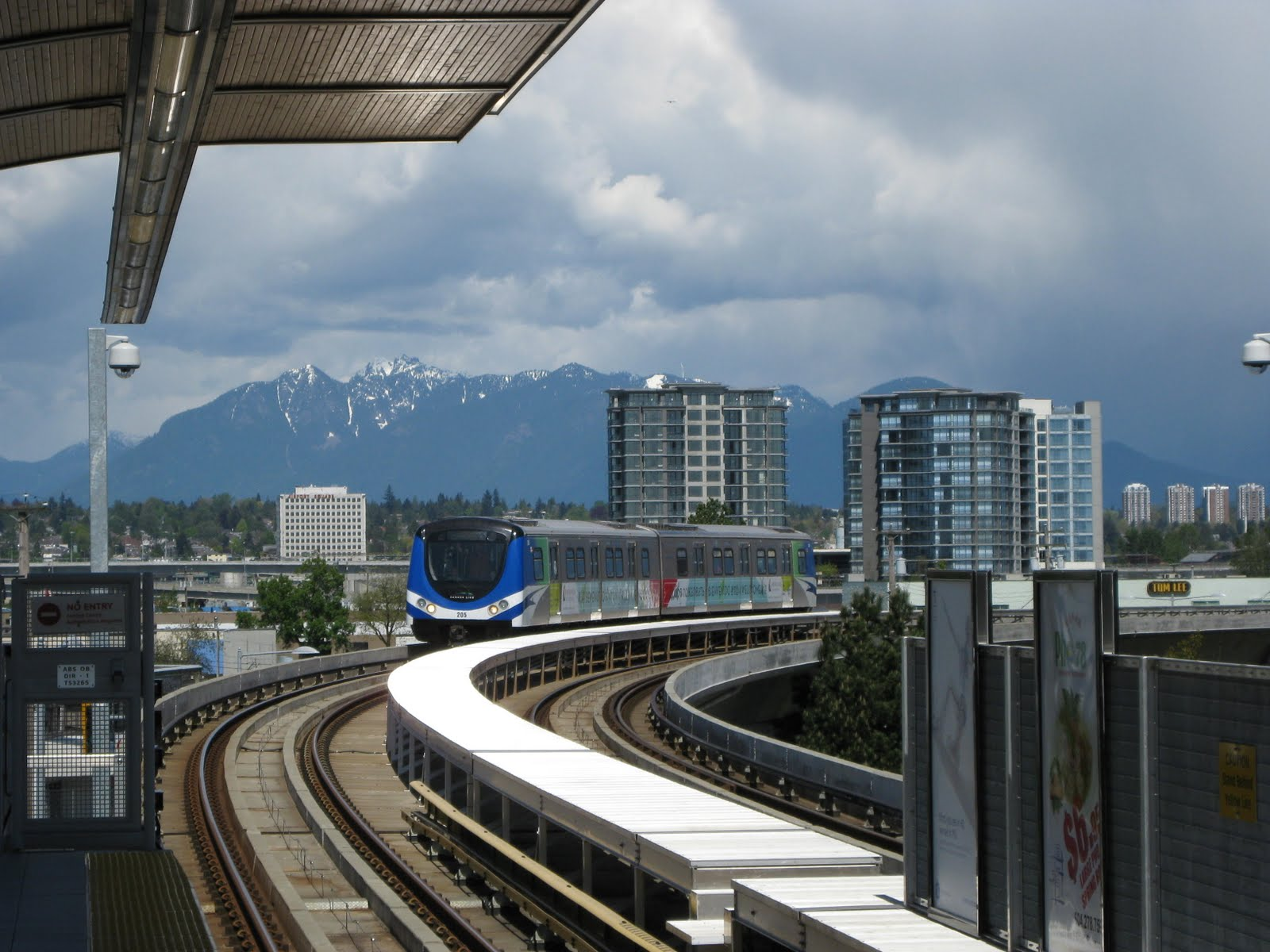
Above-ground metro tracks, such as the SkyTrain, are common transit solutions with Vancouverism.

As part of the densification and walkability that comes with Vancouverism is the expansion and reliance on public transit, often through expanding light rail, heavy metro, and commuter rail service in large metropolitan areas. For instance, the namesake city Vancouver utilises mixed-use developments built on and around many of its SkyTrain metro stations to encourage and boost ridership, resulting in greater ability to expand such networks.

== Planning process ==
One of the circumstances that allows the development of Vancouverism is more discretionary planning processes by the city. For instance, the planning process of Vancouver is based on collaboration by aligning the development goals of the city prior to determining the particular actions for individual drivers. Following the extended public outcry over a freeway and development program known as Project 200, Vancouver voted the centrist political party The Electors' Action Movement (TEAM) into the Vancouver city council, which ran on a platform of implementing more stringent design criteria and oversight to city developments. As well as favouring the urban form found along South False Creek, TEAM implemented significant reforms to the planning process. Discretionary planning allows the automatic approval of small developments that conform to the existing building codes. Larger projects are subject to the design review of the planning department, which is empowered to make decisions that will force developments to conform to certain design guidelines.

== Sustainable development ==
A key component of Vancouverism is the sustainable development of projects and expansion of city infrastructure. It requires the consideration of both the existing population and expected future generations, ensuring that the project is capable of addressing current housing and commercial needs by residents and visitors while also meeting potential changes from a growing population in the future. However, it must also not exceed the current needs too much, lest the project may risk issues with public perception of economically wasteful projects. There must also be limits in how much projects can sprawl, as maintaining close proximity to basic necessities is key in Vancouverism and sustainable developments as a whole.

== Views on Vancouverism ==
Views on Vancouverism are varied; proponents of the concept argue for its potential to expand and grow cities, revitalizing urban cores in car-centric regions, improving liveability of the city, and handling or sparking large growths in city population. On the other hand, opponents express concern over the impacts of such sudden density including gentrification of city centres, spikes in housing prices, shadows cast by towers in lower-density areas, and a lack of public engagement and negotiation in the planning process.

=== Proponents ===
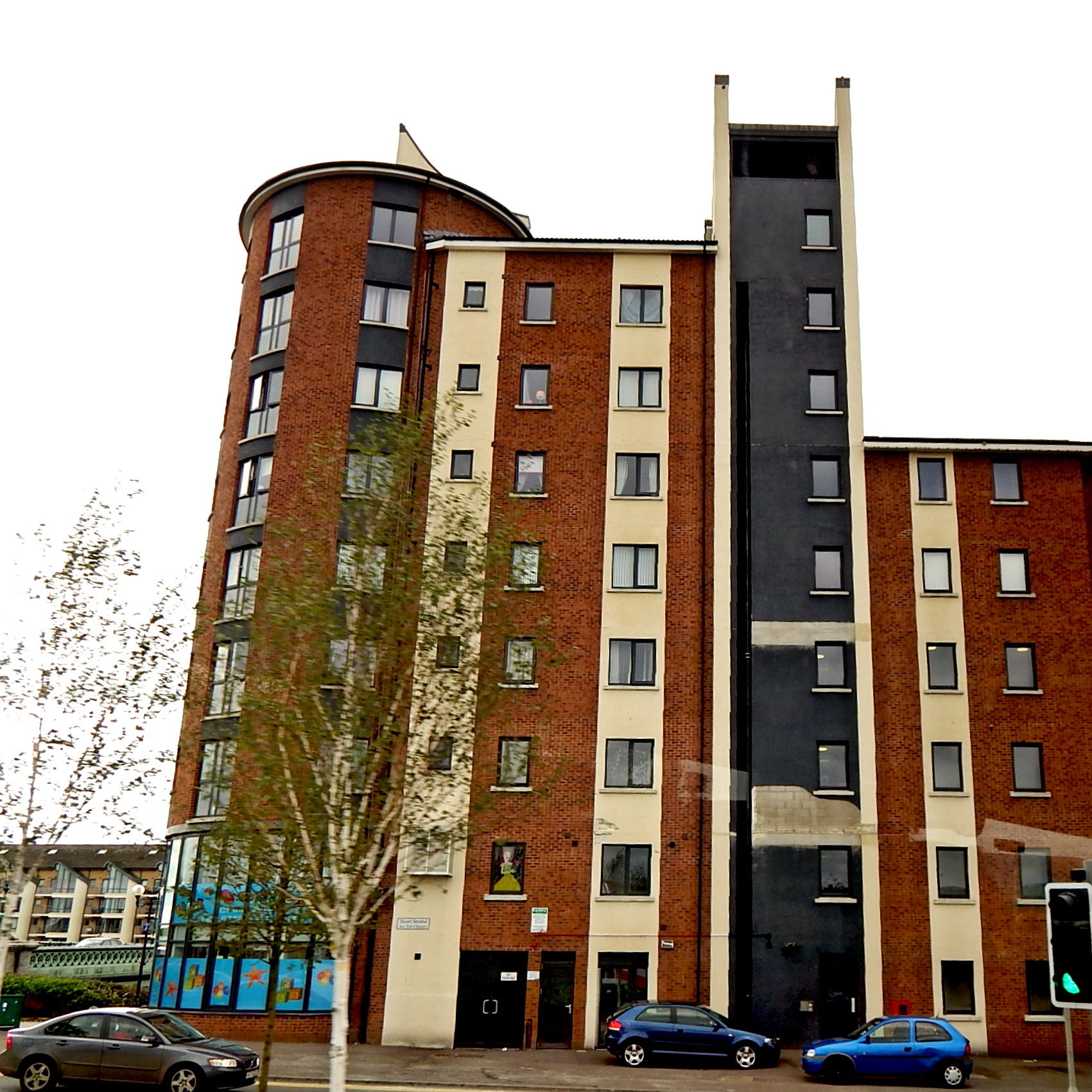
A medium-rise residential building in a residential area of Belfast, Northern Ireland.

Urban planners have expressed extensive praise for the philosophy of Vancouverism as a form of revitalizing stagnating or declining cities; as a result of the rapid expansion of infrastructure within the city and the addition of available housing into and around the city centre and surrounding areas, the housing market can be developed into a more affordable, accessible environment, thereby helping to address the housing crisis faced by many cities. Additionally, when medium-rises are used in lower-density neighborhoods, they present additional housing options for people in the community, making movement of residents and the choice between renting and owning more effective.

As a result of a growing population, Vancouverism increases the ability for the city to develop and expand its existing infrastructure; this expansion, particularly in the creation and maintenance of public spaces, can help to expand the city's livability to residents and visitors, improving the livability.

Furthermore, public transit can experience boosts in ridership through Vancouverist developments, as more residents favour utilising the closer and often efficient public transit built into and around these locations. With improvements in public transit ridership, it becomes more effective for cities to continue constructing and growing their public transit infrastructure. It provides more alternatives for travel, reducing the reliance on cars and improving the overall accessibility of the city for mobility by residents and visitors.

=== Opponents ===
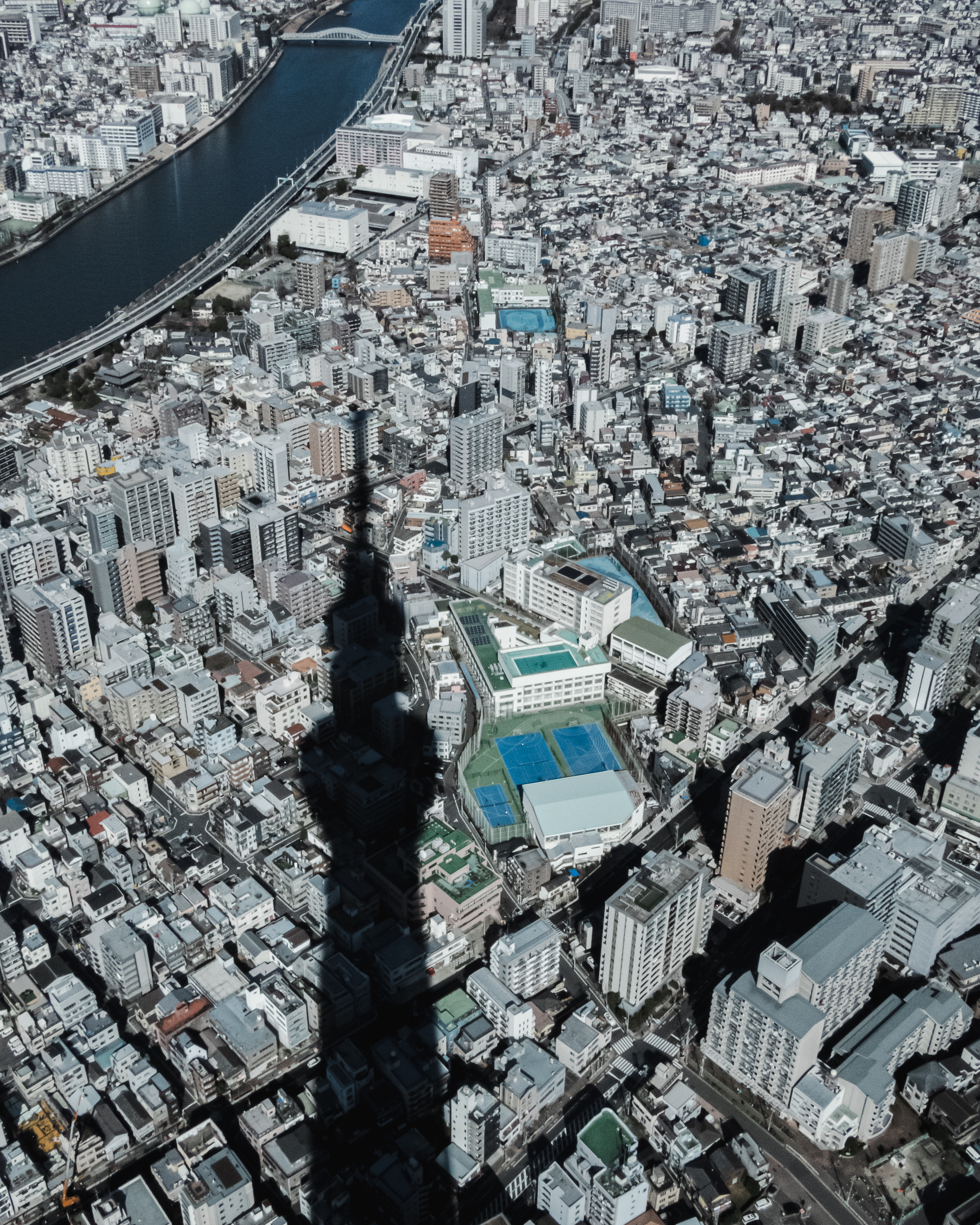
The Tokyo Skytree casting a large shadow over the Sumida ward of Tokyo, Japan, an expressed concern of Vancouverism.

Vancouver's planning process and Vancouverism have also been widely criticized by both urban planners and the public, including by prominent members of the planning and architectural communities in Vancouver, such as Patrick Condon, Scot Hein and Bing Thom, for a variety of reasons. In the instance of Vancouver, development potential on a site is typically divided into two categories, "outright" and "discretionary". Outright development is clearly defined in terms of use, height, and floor area and can proceed along a faster track than discretionary; however, the outright development potential is less than the discretionary track. A developer can exceed the outright potential by negotiating with the Planning Department over the limitations on categories that have been identified in the various planning controls at the discretion of the Director of Planning. Regardless of how the project is approached, many opponents have expressed concerns over the philosophy and strategy of Vancouverism as a whole.

Projects may have an absence of up-front quantifiable values for height, floor area, use and setbacks in discretionary planning make it difficult for planners, developers, architects, residents or any others to predict or forecast accurately what can be built on any site in the city or what the development costs will be. The negotiations between planners and developers involve large amounts of money and affect the public, but lack transparency despite being negotiated by public servants on behalf of citizens.

In some cities, Vancouverism requires a lengthy planning process, especially in cities with many restrictions on developments. Arriving at a negotiated agreement for the development of a site – usually performed as a custom rezoning arrangement called "spot rezoning", especially for a large site – produces a significant amount of work for the developer, designer and planner; the excessive workload borne by the Planning Department on numerous such approvals at any given time causes delays in the issuing of permits for development. In the case of Vancouver, the city has the longest wait times for permit approvals in the region.

The amount of money involved in real estate development, together with the discretionary power of planning officials and lack of transparency in negotiations, also combine to create a system of development approval that can be highly prone to corruption and likely to involve dark or laundered money.

== See also ==
- Architecture of Vancouver
- Brusselization
- James K. M. Cheng
- Manhattanization
- Neomodern architecture
- Vancouver Special
