= Project 200 =

Proposed waterfront redevelopment program during 1968

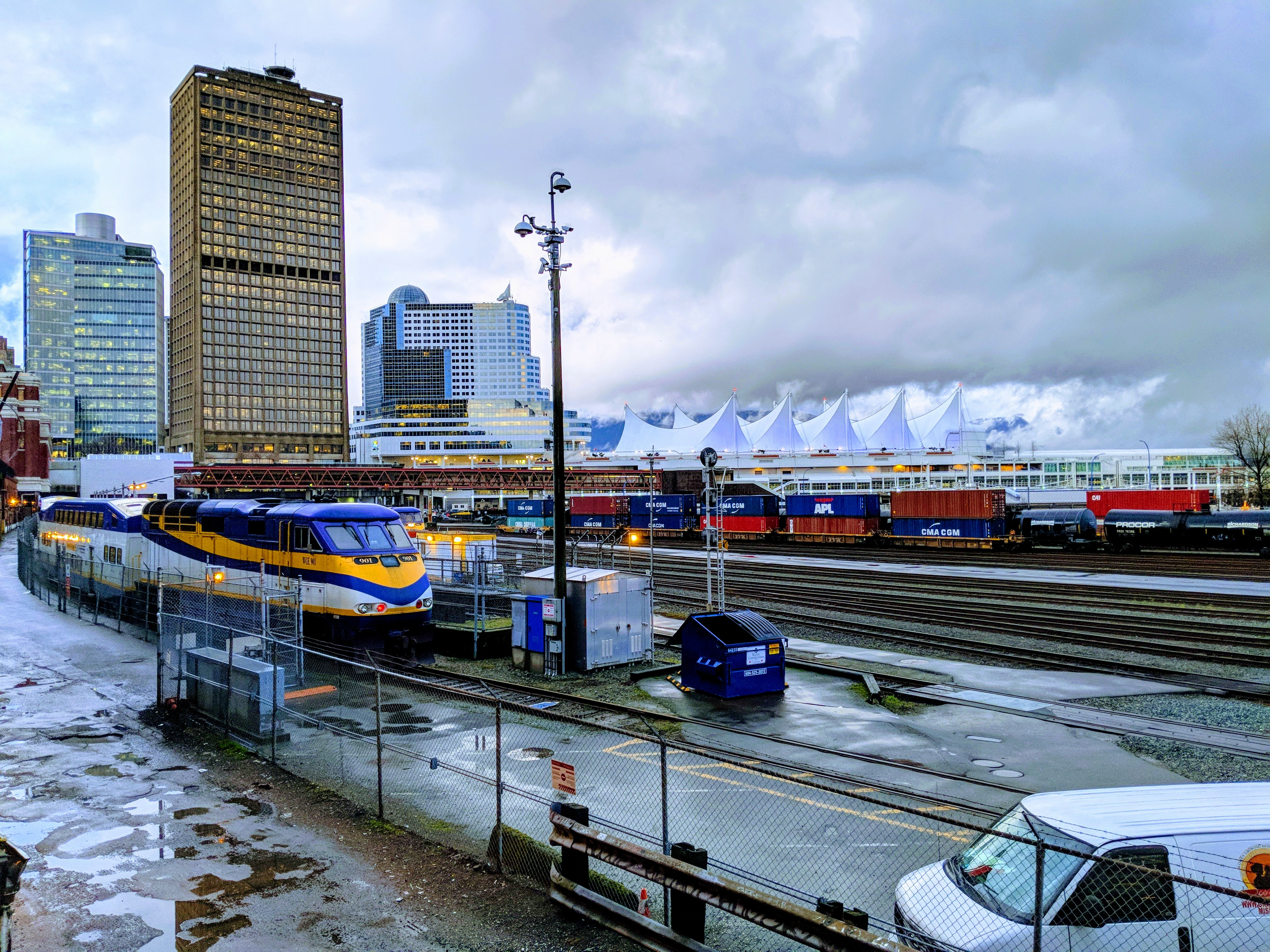
Waterfront Station with Granville Square in the background. These tracks were to be covered by a freeway linking parking garages in Downtown Vancouver with the surrounding communities.

Project 200 was a waterfront redevelopment initiative launched in 1968 in Vancouver, British Columbia. Named for its initial budget projection of $200 million, the project aimed to revitalize the area north of Cordova Street, stretching from Howe Street to Abbott Street. It was conceived as a modernist mixed-use complex, which at the time was believed to be the largest single development planned in Canada.

== Location ==
The proposed site for Project 200 was at the base of Granville Street on the harbour, consisting of some of Vancouver's most valuable real estate.

== Project design and amenities ==
The development was planned to include up to 14 office towers, 1,000 apartment units, a 40-storey hotel, 5,000 parking spaces, and comprehensive retail shopping areas featuring a new department store. Key amenities were to include elevated pedestrian plazas, offering expansive views of the waterfront and enhancing the area's accessibility and aesthetic appeal.

Central to the project was the proposed waterfront freeway, a thoroughfare intended to link the city with the Trans-Canada Highway to the east and west, and with BC Highway 99/I-5 to the south. The design included direct access to underground parking garages from the freeway.

Only a small portion of Project 200 was realised, as the project faced financial hurdles, and opposition to the demolition of historic structures such as the CPR Station, now known as Waterfront Station, which was ultimately preserved.

== Legacy ==
Although most of Project 200 did not come to fruition, several components were completed, including:

- Granville Square: This office tower at 200 Granville Street was completed in 1973, and has since become a prominent feature of Vancouver's Financial District.
- CNCP Telecommunications Building: Located at 175 W Cordova, this building was originally part of a joint venture between the two major Canadian railway companies, and is now occupied by Allstream.
- Woodward’s Parking Garage: Known today as the Cordova Street Parkade, this structure was rebuilt in the early 2000s and has since been recognized as one of the "coolest parkades in the world."

== See also ==
- Highway revolt
