= ITelegram =

International telegram provider

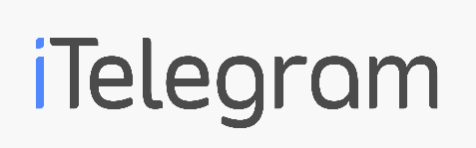

International Telegram or iTelegram provides telegram, telex, and mailgram service. Initially, it was founded as Telegrams Canada in 2003 when AT&T Canada abandoned its telegram service. It took over telegram service in the United States from Western Union on January 27, 2006.

As of 2019, the company maintains telegram services in around 180 countries.
