= Allstream Inc. =

Canadian communications business

- Company type: Subsidiary
- Founded: 1967; 59 years ago (as CNCP Telecommunications)
- Headquarters: Mississauga, Ontario, Canada
- Key people: Michael Strople (president and CEO)
- Number of employees: 200+
- Parent: Zayo Group

Allstream Inc. is a business communications provider based in Mississauga, Ontario, Canada, that provides Internet Protocol (IP) connectivity, managed IP services, unified communications and voice services to its customers in the United States and Canada.

The company traces its history to CNCP Telecommunications, a joint company operated by Canadian National Railway (CN) and Canadian Pacific Railway (CP) from the 1960s. In the 1980s, they spun off the telex and telegram network to Teleglobe Canada (later Telegrams Canada) and changed the name to Unitel Communications in a bid to offer commercial long distance service. The service changed hands several times, for a time becoming AT&T Canada.

Allstream emerged in its current form in 2012 when its latest owners Manitoba Telecom Services (MTS) split off the commercial side of their offerings. Since 2015, the company has been owned by Zayo Group, a US-based fibre optic network operator.

== History ==
When the telegraph and telex businesses went into decline, CN Telegraphs and CP Telegraphs, aligned with their respective railways, formed a joint venture in 1967, CNCP Telecommunications, to operate the telegraph and telex business more profitably. CNCP applied in 1983 to operate a long-distance network in competition with the incumbent local telephone companies' long-distance services. The application was rejected by the Canadian Radio-television and Telecommunications Commission.

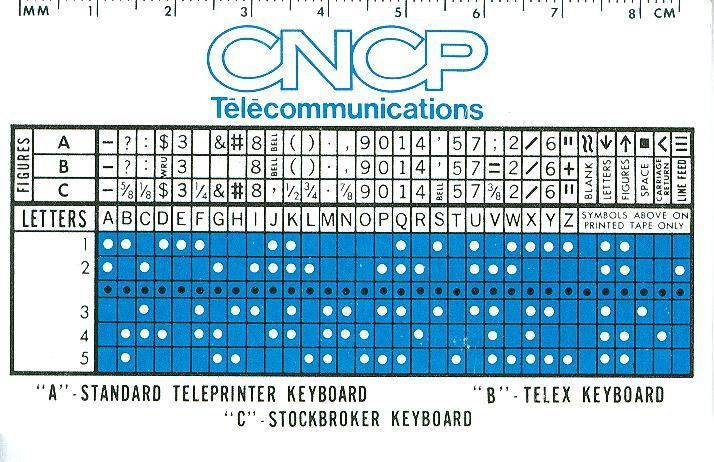
Teletype Card

CNCP later changed its name to Unitel Communications Inc., and in 1990 it made a second bid to compete in the long-distance markets of Bell Canada, BC Tel and the four Atlantic telephone companies under that name. At the time, only these four companies and Northwestel, another telecommunications company, were under federal regulation. The bid was successful, and the Canadian Radio-television and Telecommunications Commission (CRTC) opened the Canadian telephone market to long-distance competition. At the time of the decision, Alberta's AGT (later known as Telus) also had come under federal regulation, and all other Canadian carriers followed before the end of the 1990s. Each was opened to competition at different time.

Unitel, unable to compete successfully in the environment it had created, was then sold to Rogers Communications, where the company attempted to enter the competition for long-distance communication. Later, the company was sold to a consortium of Canadian banks, with AT&T Communications owning 33% share, but more than any one of the banks, giving them operational control.

For a time during the 1990s, there were Canadian TV spots for Unitel starring Steven Weber of Wings.

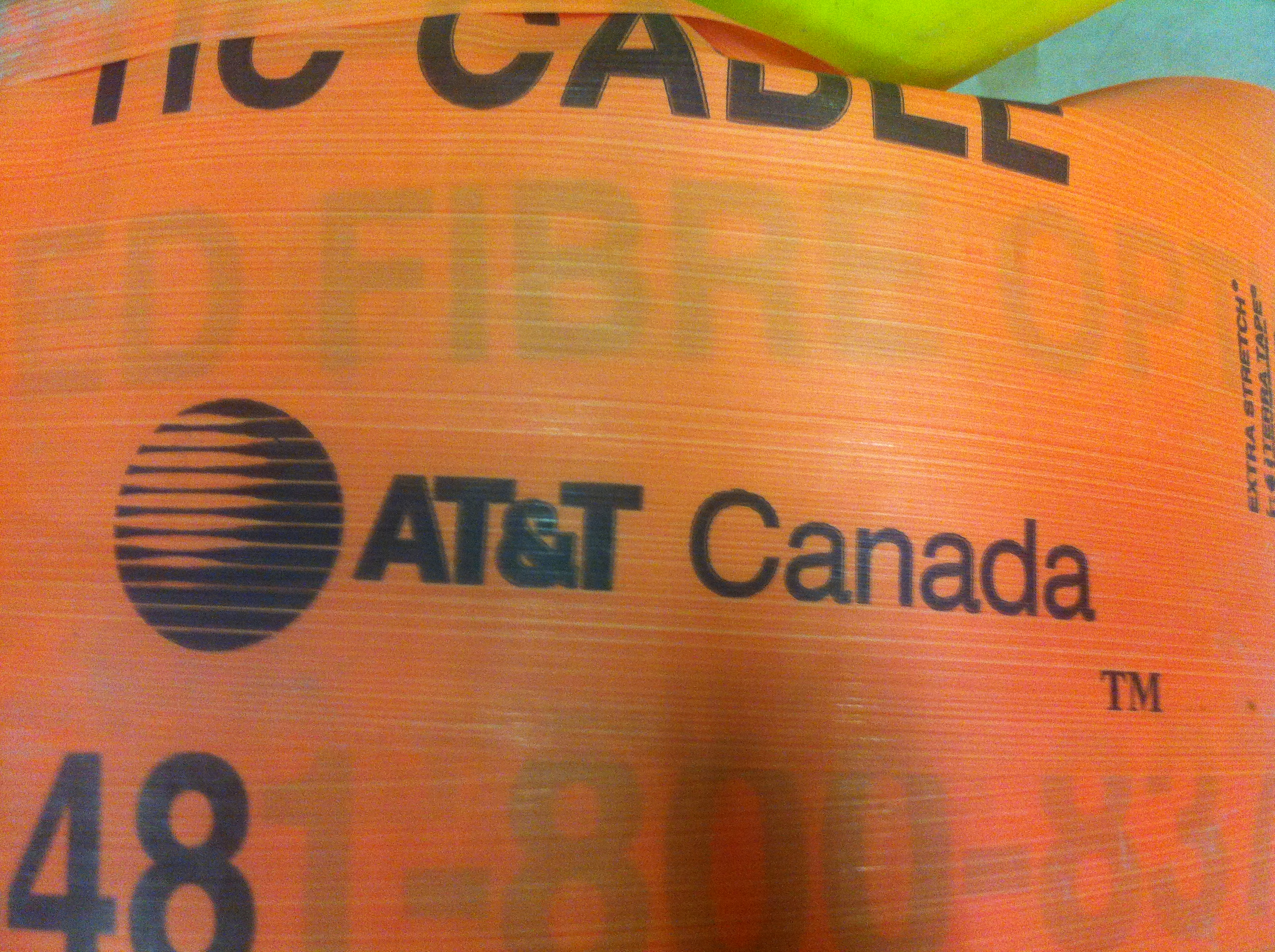
ATTCanada - Office

Unitel underwent turnaround management by CEO Bill Catucci, allowing it to be renamed AT&T Canada Long Distance Services. AT&T Canada was a Canadian long-distance telephone service provider, the Canadian subsidiary of AT&T Communications. In 1999, the company also merged with Metronet Communications of Calgary, Alberta. In 2003, the company was renamed Allstream as a result of AT&T's declining participation in the company. AT&T sold its remaining interests in the Canadian company in 2004.

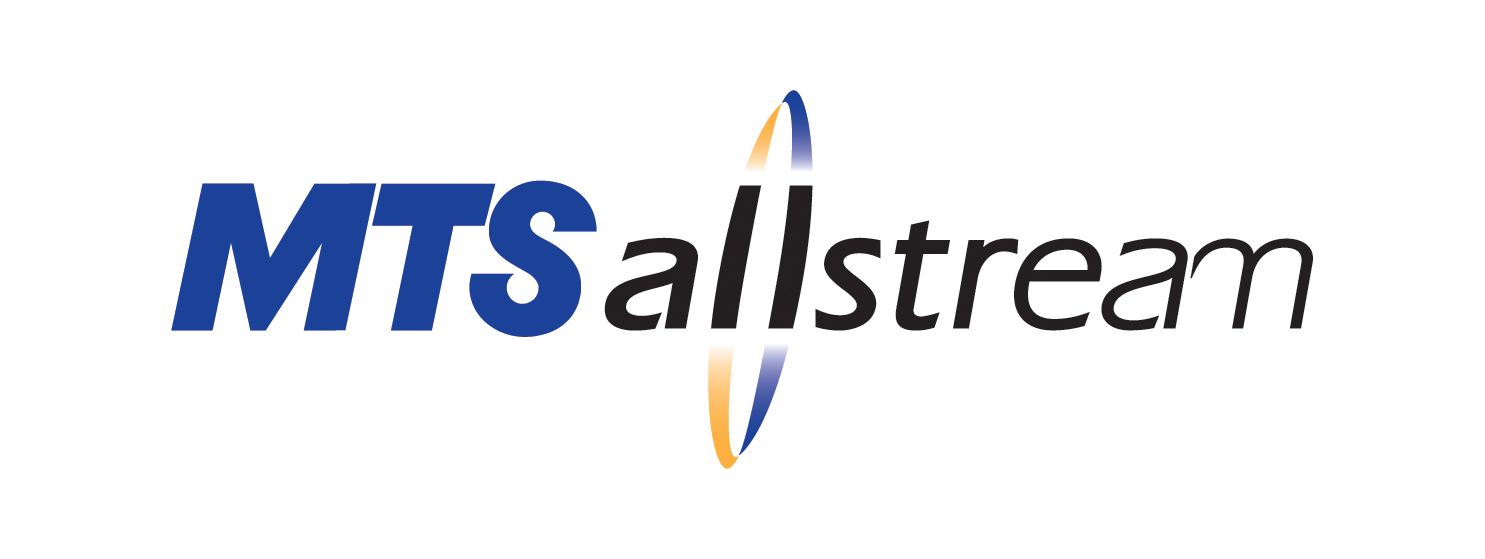
MTSAllstream Logo 2004

The company was subsequently acquired by MTS in 2004 and was renamed MTS Allstream Inc. until 2012, when it was divided into two separate companies, MTS Inc. and Allstream Inc. Allstream was to be sold to Accelero Capital in May 2013, with the deal expected to close by the end of the year. However, on 7 October 2013, the Government of Canada blocked the sale over "concerns of national security", noting that "MTS Allstream operates a national fibre optic network that provides critical telecommunications services to businesses and governments, including the Government of Canada."

Allstream was sold to US fibre optic provider Zayo Group on 15 January 2016, for CA$465 million. In 2017, Zayo acquired Electric Lightwave/Integra Telecom, and integrated the voice and small business assets of Allstream and Electric Lightwave/Integra Telecom under the Allstream brand and established Allstream as a separate operating subsidiary. Following Zayo Group’s privatization in 2020, led by EQT and Digital Colony, a new board of directors was established for Allstream.

From 2009 until 2017, Allstream held the naming rights to the Allstream Centre convention facility in Toronto, Ontario, Canada, housed in the heritage Automotive Building.
