= Telex =

Switched network of teleprinters

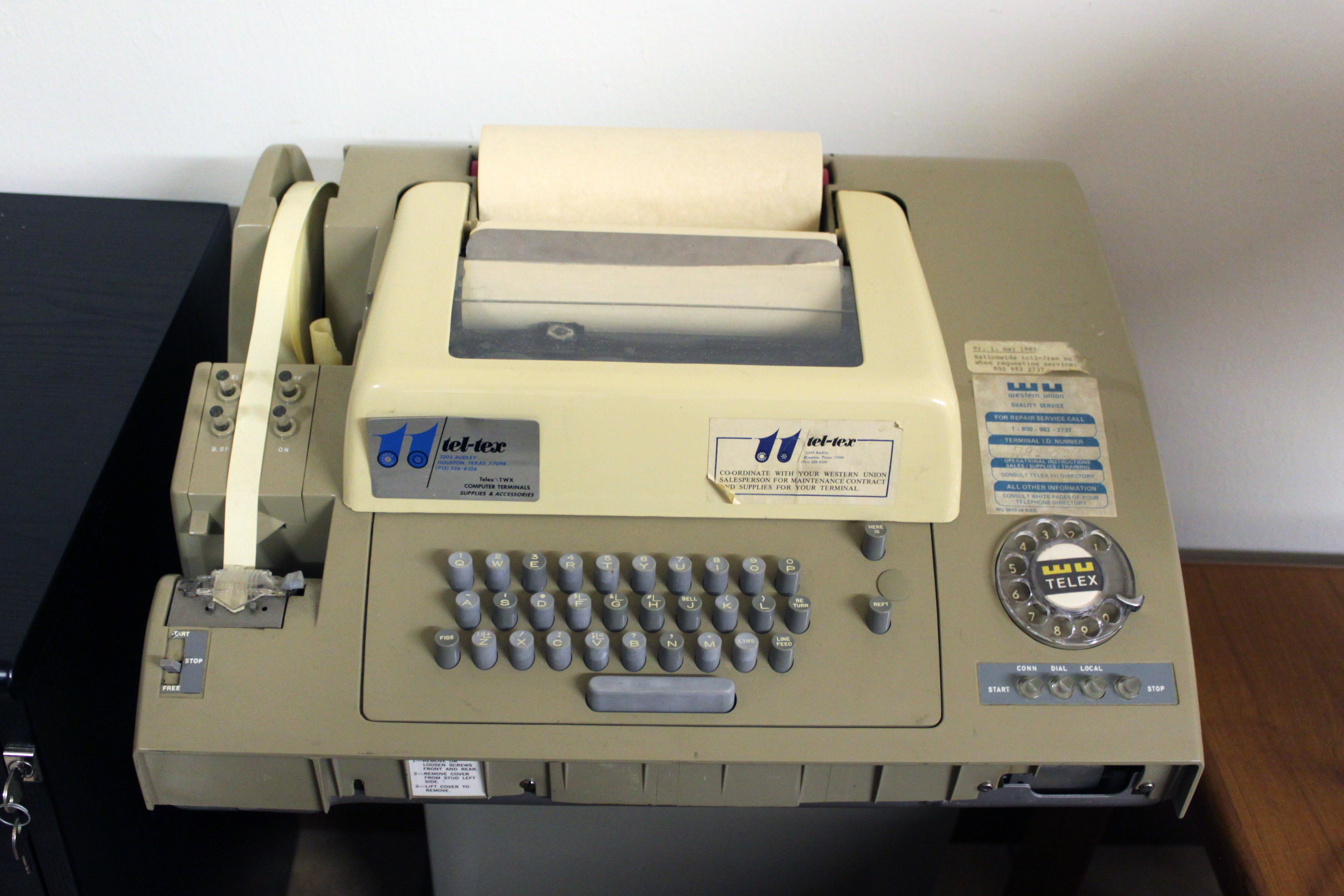
A Teletype Model 32 used for telex service

Telex is a telecommunication system that allows text-based messages to be sent and received by teleprinter over telephone lines. The term "telex" may refer to the service, the network, the devices, or a message sent using these. Telex emerged in Germany in the 1930s and became a major method of sending text messages electronically between businesses in the post–World War II period. Its usage declined as the fax machine grew in popularity in the 1980s.

The technology operates over the circuits of the public switched telephone network or by private lines, using binary signals encoded with the International Telegraph Alphabet No. 2 at a standard speed of 50 baud. Telex provided the first common medium for international record communications using standard signalling techniques as specified by the International Telecommunication Union (ITU). A key feature of telex was the "answerback" system, which allowed senders to confirm with a high degree of certainty that their message had been received by the correct recipient.

Telex networks were established in many countries. In the United States, the American Telephone and Telegraph Company developed the Teletypewriter Exchange Service (TWX) beginning in 1931, while Western Union built a separate telex network starting in 1958. The United Kingdom developed its own telex network from the 1930s, with full automatic switching completed by 1961. Canada, New Zealand, Kenya, and many other nations also established telex services, often connecting local subscribers to an international network spanning Europe, Africa, Asia, and the Americas. In the 1980s, the successor to CCITT, ITU-T, developed an enhanced system, Teletex, which only saw limited adoption, although some of the associated standards influenced computer networking protocols such as LDAP.

Telex has been largely superseded by fax, email, and systems such as SWIFT, though radiotelex via HF radio remains in use in the maritime industry as part of the Global Maritime Distress and Safety System.

== Technology ==
The technology operates on switched station-to-station basis with teleprinter devices at the receiving and sending locations. It operates over the circuits of the public switched telephone network or by private lines. Point-to-point teleprinter systems had been in use long before telex exchanges were built in the 1930s. Teleprinters evolved from telegraph systems, and, like the telegraph, use binary signals, with mark and space logic represented by the presence or absence of a certain level of electric current. This differs from the analog telephone system, which used varying voltage to represent sound. For this reason, telex exchanges were entirely separate from the telephone system, with their own signalling standards, exchanges and system of telex numbers (the counterpart of telephone numbers).

Telex provided the first common medium for international record communications using standard signalling techniques and operating criteria as specified by the International Telecommunication Union. Customers on any telex exchange could deliver messages to any other, around the world. To reduce connecting line usage, telex messages were encoded onto paper tape and then read into the line as quickly as possible. The system normally delivered information at 50 baud or approximately 66 words per minute, encoded using the International Telegraph Alphabet No. 2. In the last days of the traditional telex networks, end-user equipment was often replaced by modems and phone lines, reducing the telex network to what was effectively a directory service running on the telephone network.

== Development ==
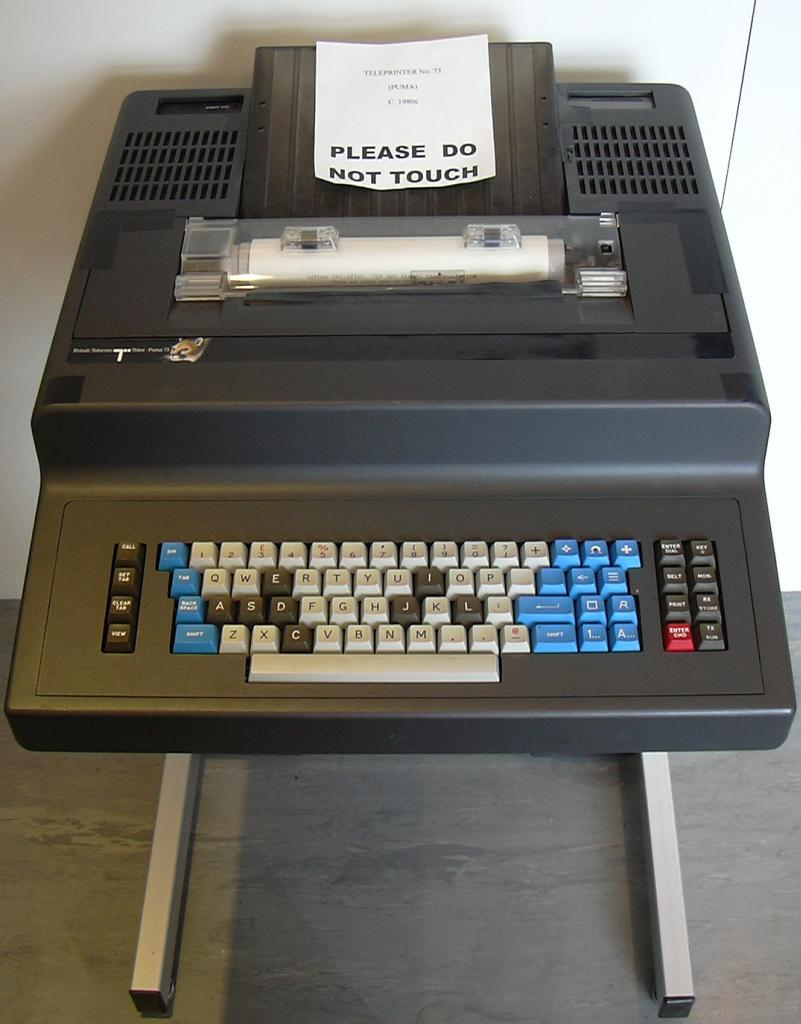
A late-model British Telecom "Puma" telex machine of the 1980s

Telex began in Germany as a research and development program in 1926 that became an operational teleprinter service in 1933. The service, operated by the German Reichspost had a speed of 50 baud, which is approximately 66 words per minute.

Soon after, telex services were developed by other nations. Telex spread within Europe and after 1945 around the world.

By 1978, West Germany, including West Berlin, had 123,298 telex connections. Long before automatic telephony became available, most countries, even in central Africa and Asia, had at least a few high-frequency shortwave telex links. Often, government postal and telegraph services (PTTs) initiated these radio links. The most common radio standard, CCITT R.44 had error-corrected retransmitting time-division multiplexing of radio channels. Most impoverished PTTs operated their telex-on-radio (TOR) channels non-stop, to get the maximum value from them.

The cost of TOR equipment has continued to fall. Although the system initially required specialised equipment, as of 2016 many amateur radio operators operate TOR, also known as radioteletype (RTTY), with special software and inexpensive hardware to connect computer sound cards to short-wave radios.

Modern cablegrams or telegrams actually operate over dedicated telex networks, using TOR whenever required.

Telex served as the forerunner of modern fax, email, and text messaging – both technically and stylistically. Abbreviated English (like "CU L8R" for "see you later") as used in texting originated with telex operators exchanging informal messages in real time – they became the first "texters" long before the introduction of mobile phones. Telex users could send the same message to several places around the world at the same time, like email today, using the Western Union InfoMaster Computer. This involved transmitting the message via paper tape to the InfoMaster Computer (dial code 6111) and specifying the destination addresses for the single text. In this way, a single message could be sent to multiple distant telex and TWX machines as well as delivering the same message to non-telex and non-TWX subscribers via Western Union Mailgram.

== Operation and applications ==
Telex messages are routed by addressing them to a telex address, e.g., "14910 ERIC S", where 14910 is the subscriber number, ERIC is an abbreviation for the subscriber's name (in this case Telefonaktiebolaget L.M. Ericsson in Sweden) and S is the country code or location code. Solutions also exist for the automatic routing of messages to different telex terminals within a subscriber organization, by using different terminal identities, e.g., "+T148". The country codes (formally, network identification codes) for the first countries to adopt telex are single letters, while other countries have two-letter codes. Some specialty services and American cities have three-letter network or location codes (such as MAS for Inmarsat or LSA for Los Angeles), and a few towns have four-letter codes (such as ROVE for Rockville, Maryland).

A major advantage of telex is that the receipt of the message by the recipient could be confirmed with a high degree of certainty by the "answerback", which is a transmission-control enquiry character. At the beginning of the message, the sender would transmit a WRU (Who are you?) code, and the recipient machine would automatically initiate a response which was usually encoded in a rotating drum with pegs, much like a music box. The position of the pegs sent an unambiguous identifying code to the sender, so the sender could verify connection to the correct recipient. The WRU code would also be sent at the end of the message, so a correct response would confirm that the connection had remained unbroken during the message transmission. This gave telex a major advantage over group 2 fax, which had no inherent error-checking capability.

The usual method of operation was that the message would be prepared off-line, using paper tape. All common telex machines incorporated a five-hole paper-tape punch and reader. Once the paper tape had been prepared, the message could be transmitted in minimum time. Telex billing was always by connected duration, so minimizing the connected time saved money. However, it was also possible to connect in "real-time", where the sender and the recipient could both type on the keyboard and these characters would be immediately printed on the distant machine.

Telex could also be used as a rudimentary but functional carrier of information from one IT system to another, in effect a primitive forerunner of electronic data interchange. The sending IT system would create an output (e.g., an inventory list) on paper tape using a mutually agreed format. The tape would be sent by telex and collected on a corresponding paper tape by the receiver and this tape could then be read into the receiving IT system.

One use of telex circuits, in use until the widescale adoption of X.400 and Internet email, was to facilitate a message handling system, allowing local email systems to exchange messages with other email and telex systems via a central routing operation, or switch. One of the largest such switches was operated by Royal Dutch Shell as recently as 1994, permitting the exchange of messages between a number of IBM Officevision, Digital Equipment Corporation ALL-IN-1 and Microsoft Mail systems. In addition to permitting email to be sent to telex, formal coding conventions adopted in the composition of telex messages enabled automatic routing of telexes to email recipients.

== United States ==
=== Teletypewriter Exchange Service ===
The Teletypewriter Exchange Service (TWX) was developed by the American Telephone and Telegraph Company (AT&T) in the United States, commencing service on November 21, 1931.

From 1942 to 1952, AT&T published progress with the system in the trade magazine TWX. It published articles that touched upon many aspects of the technology.

From inception to 1962, access to the service was provided by operator-assisted, manual switching. By 1962, the network had grown to 100 switchboard locations to handle the traffic, causing considerable delay in the speed of connections of up to 2 1/2 minutes on average. On August 31, 1962, the service was integrated into the Direct Distance Dialing (DDD) network, which improved connection times to about thirty seconds. For the new dial technology, each station was assigned a ten-digit telephone number from a reserved set of N10 area codes, designated as Service Access Codes (SAC). Area code 510 was assigned for the United States and Area Code 610 in Canada. Sixteen operating centers were established across the United States.

Later in the decade, the United States was subdivided into three service regions. and assigned codes from the remaining set of SACs (710, 810, and 910). SAC 710 covered the Northeast of the United States (New England, New York, New Jersey, Pennsylvania, Maryland, the District of Columbia, Virginia, and West Virginia). 810 was assigned from Michigan southward and east of the Mississippi River to Ohio, Indiana, and Kentucky, and the entire South and 910 served west of the Mississippi to the Southwest and West Coast.

TWX lines were configured with a special Class of Service to prevent interconnections with voice services.

Western Union purchased the TWX system from AT&T in January 1969. The TWX system and the use of the special US area codes continued until 1981, when Western Union completed the conversion to the Western Union Telex II system.

Canada moved its TWX-numbers, as well as Datalink services, to the non-geographic area code 600, effective October 1, 1993, in exchange for returning 610.

The network originally transmitted at a speed of 45.45 baud, or approximately 60 words per minute, using five-bit Baudot code, often referred to as 3-row coding with 32 characters arranged in three key rows of the keyboard.

In 1963, AT&T implemented a new coding technology for TWX, called 4-row (64 characters in four key rows) based on the new Teletype Model 33 teleprinter using a 110-baud modem and a subset of the seven-bit ASCII code without lower-case letters. TWX was offered in both 3-row Baudot and 4-row ASCII versions up to the late 1970s.

The modem for the 4-row ASCII service was the Bell 101 dataset, developed by 1958 for military applications. It is the direct ancestor of the Bell 103 modem that launched computer time-sharing. The 101 was revolutionary because it allowed the Bell System to run TWX on its regular voice telephone lines.

The code and speed conversion between 3-row Baudot and 4-row ASCII TWX service was accomplished using a special Bell 10A/B board via a live operator. A TWX customer would place a call to the 10A/B board operator for Baudot–ASCII calls, ASCII–Baudot calls, and also TWX conference calls. The code and speed conversion was facilitated by a special service unit made by Western Electric. Multiple code and speed conversion units were placed at each operator position.

During the conversion to Telex II, the remaining 3-row Baudot customers were converted to the new service during the period 1979 to 1981.

In February 1969, AT&T installed the first electronic switching system (ESS) for TWX service. It was a version of the No. 1ESS switch, arranged for data features (1ESS-AFD) in the Long Lines Department of AT&T. It had a capacity of handling 1,250 4-row teletypewriters. However, due to the purchase of TWX by Western Union, further installations were canceled.

Western Union's Telex II system was re-acquired by AT&T in 1990 in the purchase of the Western Union assets that became AT&T EasyLink Services.

=== Western Union ===
In 1958, Western Union started to build a telex network in the United States. This telex network started as a satellite exchange located in New York City and expanded to a nationwide network. Western Union chose Siemens & Halske AG, now Siemens AG, and ITT to supply the exchange equipment, provisioned the exchange trunks via the Western Union national microwave system and leased the exchange to customer site facilities from the local telephone company. Teleprinter equipment was originally provided by Siemens & Halske AG and later by Teletype Corporation. Initial direct international telex service was offered by Western Union, via W.U. International, in the summer of 1960 with limited service to London and Paris. In 1962, the major exchanges were located in New York City (1), Chicago (2), San Francisco (3), Kansas City (4) and Atlanta (5). The telex network expanded by adding the final parent exchange cities of Los Angeles (6), Dallas (7), Philadelphia (8) and Boston (9), starting in 1966.

The telex numbering plan, usually a six-digit number in the United States, was based on the major exchange where the customer's telex machine terminated. For example, all telex customers that terminated in the New York City exchange were assigned a telex number that started with a first digit "1". Further, all Chicago-based customers had telex numbers that started with a first digit of "2". This numbering plan was maintained by Western Union as the telex exchanges proliferated to smaller cities in the United States. The Western Union Telex network was built on three levels of exchanges. The highest level was made up of the nine exchange cities previously mentioned. Each of these cities had the dual capability of terminating telex customer lines and setting up trunk connections to multiple distant telex exchanges. The second level of exchanges, located in large cities such as Buffalo, Cleveland, Miami, Newark, Pittsburgh and Seattle, were similar to the highest level of exchanges in capability of terminating telex customer lines and setting up trunk connections. However, these second level exchanges had a smaller customer line capacity and only had trunk circuits connected to regional cities. The third level of exchanges, located in small to medium-sized cities, could terminate telex customer lines and had a single trunk group running to its parent exchange.

Loop signaling was offered in two different configurations for Western Union Telex in the United States. The first option, sometimes called local or loop service, provided a 60 milliampere loop circuit from the exchange to the customer teleprinter. The second option, sometimes called long distance or polar was used when a 60 milliampere connection could not be achieved, provided a ground return polar circuit using 35 milliamperes on separate send and receive wires. By the 1970s, under pressure from the Bell operating companies wanting to modernize their cable plant and lower the adjacent circuit noise that these telex circuits sometimes caused, Western Union migrated customers to a third option called F1F2. This F1F2 option replaced the DC voltage of the local and long distance options with Bell 108 modems at the exchange and subscriber ends of the telex circuit. The Bell 108 was operationally compatible with the Bell 103 standard, minus ring detection, as it was designed for use over leased lines.

Western Union offered connections from telex to the AT&T Teletypewriter Exchange (TWX) system in May 1966 via its New York Information Services Computer Center. These connections were limited to those TWX machines that were equipped with automatic answerback capability per CCITT standard.

USA-based telex users could send the same message to several places around the world at the same time, like email today, using the Western Union InfoMaster Computer. This involved transmitting the message via paper tape to the InfoMaster Computer (dial code 6111) and specifying the destination addresses for the single text. In this way, a single message could be sent to multiple distant telex and TWX machines as well as delivering the same message to non-telex and non-TWX subscribers via Western Union Mailgram.

=== International record carriers ===
International record carrier (IRC) was a term created by the Federal Communications Commission in the United States. Bell's original consent agreement limited it to international dial telephony, and the Western Union Telegraph Company had given up its international telegraphic operation in a 1939 bid to monopolize U.S. telegraphy by taking over ITT's postal, telegraph and telephone service (PTT) business. The result was a de-emphasis on telex in the U.S. and the creation of several international telex and telegraphy companies, collectively called IRCs:

- Western Union Telegraph Company developed a subsidiary named Western Union Cable System. This company was later renamed as Western Union International (WUI) when it was spun off by Western Union as an independent company. WUI was purchased by MCI Communications (MCI) in 1982 and operated as a subsidiary of MCI International.
- ITT's "World Communications" division (later known as ITT World Communications) was amalgamated from many smaller companies: Federal Telegraph, All American Cables and Radio, Globe Wireless, and the common carrier division of Mackay Marine. ITT World Communications was purchased by Western Union in 1987.
- RCA Communications (later known as RCA Global Communications) had specialized in global radiotelegraphic connections. In 1987, it was purchased by MCI International.
- Before World War I, the Tropical Radiotelegraph Company (later known as Tropical Radio Telecommunications, or TRT) put radio telegraphs on ships for its owner, the United Fruit Company (UFC), to enable them to deliver bananas to the best-paying markets. Communications expanded to UFC's plantations, and were eventually provided to local governments. TRT eventually became the national carrier for many small Central American nations.
- The French Telegraph Cable Company (later known as FTC Communications, or just FTCC), which was founded in 1871, was owned by French investors and headquartered in the United States; it laid transatlantic cable between the two countries. International telegrams routed via FTCC used routing ID "PQ", the initials of the company's founder, Augustin Pouyer-Quertier (1820–1891).
- Firestone Rubber developed its own IRC, the United States-Liberia Radio Corporation, which operated shortwave from Akron, Ohio to the rubber plantations in Liberia. Services on this circuit were formally discontinued in 1994.

Bell Telex users had to select which IRC to use, and then append the necessary routing digits. The IRCs converted between TWX and Western Union Telegraph Co. standards.

== United Kingdom ==
Telex began in the UK as an evolution from the 1930s Telex Printergram service, appearing in 1932 on a limited basis. This used the telephone network in conjunction with a Teleprinter 7B and signalling equipment to send a message to another subscriber with a teleprinter, or to the Central Telegraph Office.

In 1945, as the traffic increased, it was decided to have a separate network for telex traffic, and the first manual exchange opened in London. By 1954, the public inland telex service opened via manually switched exchanges. A number of subscribers were served via automatic sub-centres which used relays and Type 2 uniselectors, acting as concentrators for a manual exchange.

In the late 1950s, the decision was made to convert to automatic switching and this was completed by 1961; there were 21 exchanges spread across the country, with one international exchange in London. The equipment used the Strowger system for switching, as was the case for the telephone network. Conversion to Stored Programme Control (SPC) began in 1984 using exchanges made by Canadian Marconi, with the last Strowger exchange closing in 1992. User numbers increased over the ensuing years into the 1990s.

The dominant supplier of the telex machines was Creed & Company, a division of the ITT Corporation.

A separate service Secure Stream 300 (previously Circuit Switched Data Network) was a variant of telex running at 300 baud, used for telemetry and monitoring purposes by utility companies and banks, among others. This was a high-security virtual private wire system with a high degree of resilience through diversely routed dual-path network configurations.

After privatization of the telecommunications network under Margaret Thatcher's government at the start of the 1980s, Mercury Communications also provided a telex network, based on T200-series switching equipment supplied by the Swiss company Hasler in 1986 (after 1987 a member of the Ascom company). In 1996 Mercury was incorporated into Cable & Wireless Communications, which continued telex operation until 2006 when the remaining telex subscribers were transferred to Swiss Telex, which operated a multinational telex network until 2020 (also with T200 equipment).

British Telecom stopped offering the telex service to new customers in 2004 and discontinued the service in 2008, allowing users to transfer to Swiss Telex if they wished to continue to use telex.

== Canada ==
Canada-wide automatic teleprinter exchange service was introduced by the CPR Telegraph Company and CN Telegraph in July 1957 (the two companies, operated by rivals Canadian National Railway and Canadian Pacific Railway, would join to form CNCP Telecommunications in 1967). This service supplemented the existing international telex service that was put in place in November 1956. Canadian telex customers could connect with nineteen European countries in addition to eighteen Latin American, African, and trans-Pacific countries. The major exchanges were located in Montreal (01), Toronto (02), and Winnipeg (03).

== New Zealand ==
In 1960, telex was introduced in New Zealand for businesses to communicate with the northern hemisphere, specially with the United Kingdom. In 1966 there were over 400 subscribers, and by 1981 the number had jumped to 3,600.

In 1960, the New Zealand Post Office released GENTEX, a telex system cheaper than those otherwise available at the time.

== Kenya ==
Telex was introduced in Kenya by the British Empire during the Kenya Colony period. International telex and telephone lines were installed on Kenya's major urban centers, such as Nairobi and Mombasa, to connect British administrators and merchants with their counterparts in England. After the independence of Kenya in 1963, the telex system was expanded to the rural areas. In 1977 there were 920 lines on Kenya, raised to 2,800 in 1988.

== Decline ==
Telex is still in operation but not in the sense described in the CCITT Blue Book documentation. Telex has been mostly superseded by fax, email, and SWIFT, although radiotelex (telex via HF radio) is still used in the maritime industry and is a required element of the Global Maritime Distress and Safety System.

== See also ==
- Dot matrix printing
- Morse code
- Telegraphy
- Text messaging
- Ticker tape
- Worldwide use of telegrams by country
- Fax
