= Granville Square =

Building in Vancouver, Canada

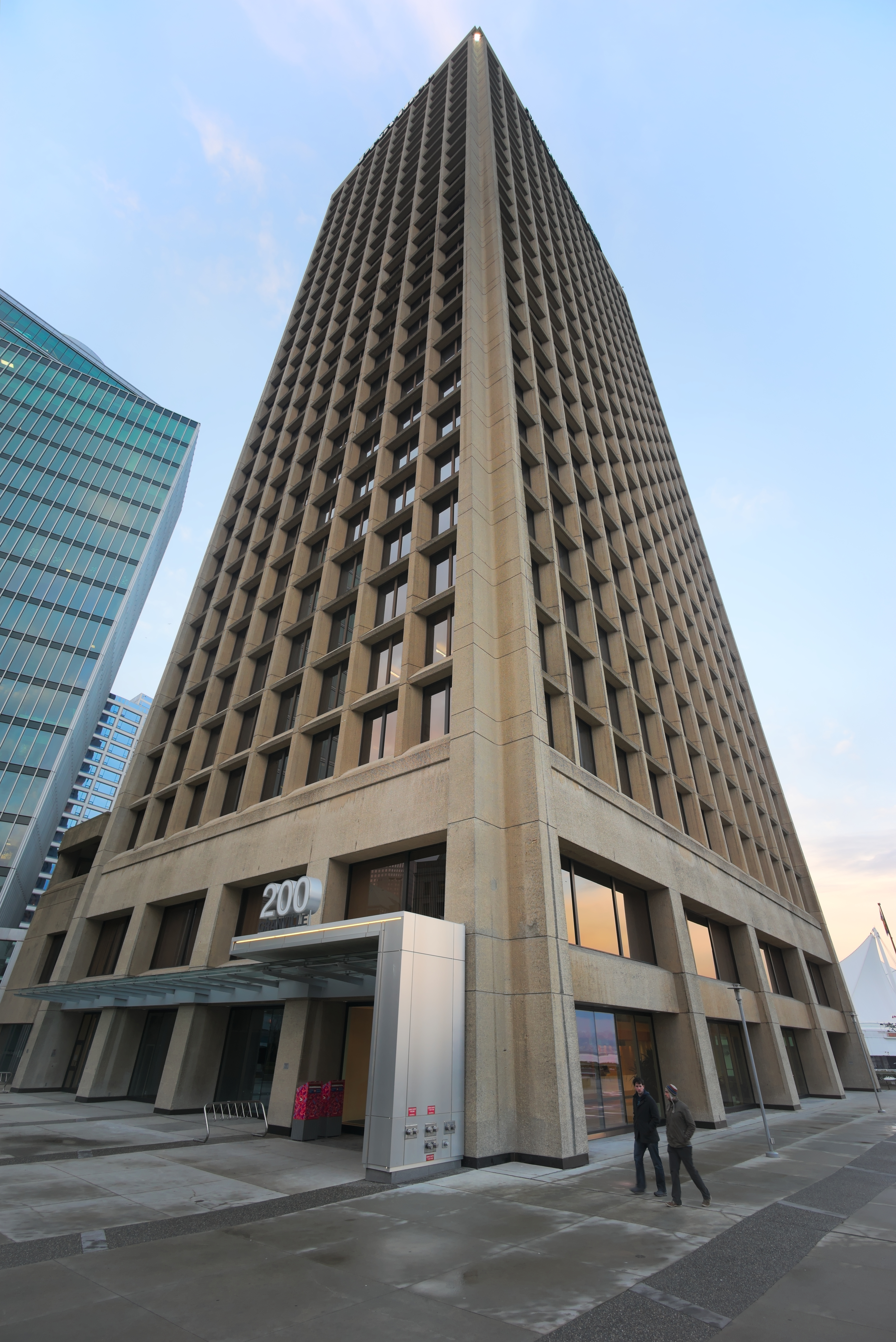

General information
- Status: Completed
- Type: Office
- Architectural style: Brutalist / Modernist
- Location: 200 Granville Street; Vancouver, British Columbia; V6C 1S4
- Coordinates: 49°17′13″N 123°06′45″W
- Construction started: 1971
- Completed: 1973

Height
- Architectural: 138.4 m (454 ft)

Technical details
- Floor count: 30
- Floor area: 36,940 m^{2} (397,600 sq ft)

Design and construction
- Architect: Francis Donaldson
- Developer: Marathon Reality

Granville Square is a prominent tower located at 200 Granville Street in the Financial District of the downtown core of Vancouver, British Columbia, Canada. Completed in 1973, the building stands at 138.4 metres (454 feet) tall. The building and its plaza are located adjacent to Waterfront Station (formerly CPR station), atop the tracks of the Canadian Pacific Railway.

== History ==
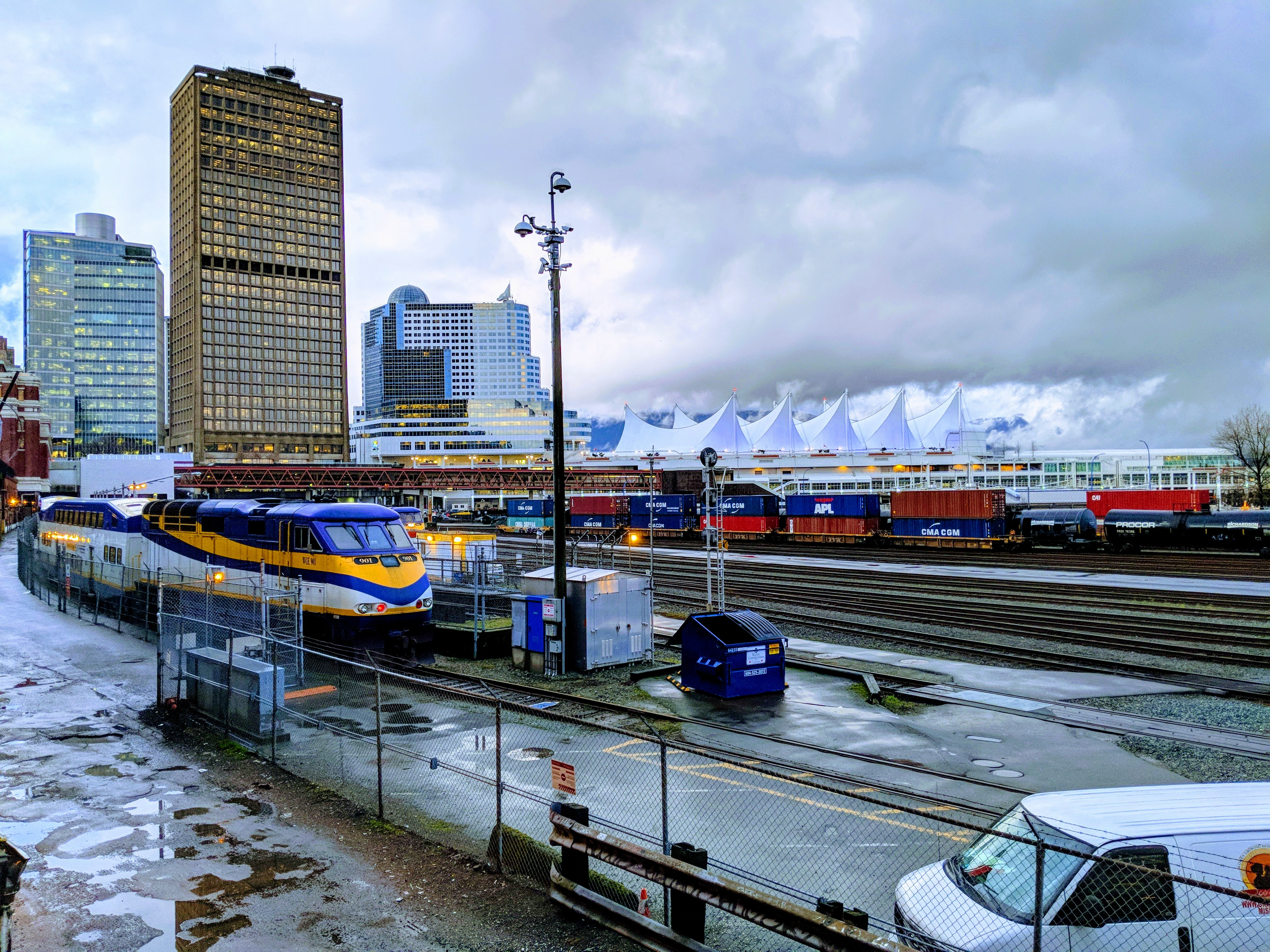
Granville Square overlooks the rail yard of Waterfront station.

Granville Square was originally built by Marathon Realty to house the headquarters of the Canadian Pacific Railway. Construction of the building began in 1971 and finished in 1973. The tower was one of the only completed parts of Project 200, a proposed mixed-use redevelopment in Vancouver's Gastown and Downtown Eastside neighbourhoods. The project included offices, hotels, and residential towers to be built over the CPR train tracks and other historic structures. The project was cancelled due to a lack of funding and grassroots opposition, leaving Granville Square as one of its only remnants.

In 2022, Granville Square received a Zero Carbon Building certification from the Canada Green Building Council (CaGBC) following a number of decarbonization initiatives.

== Ownership and usage ==
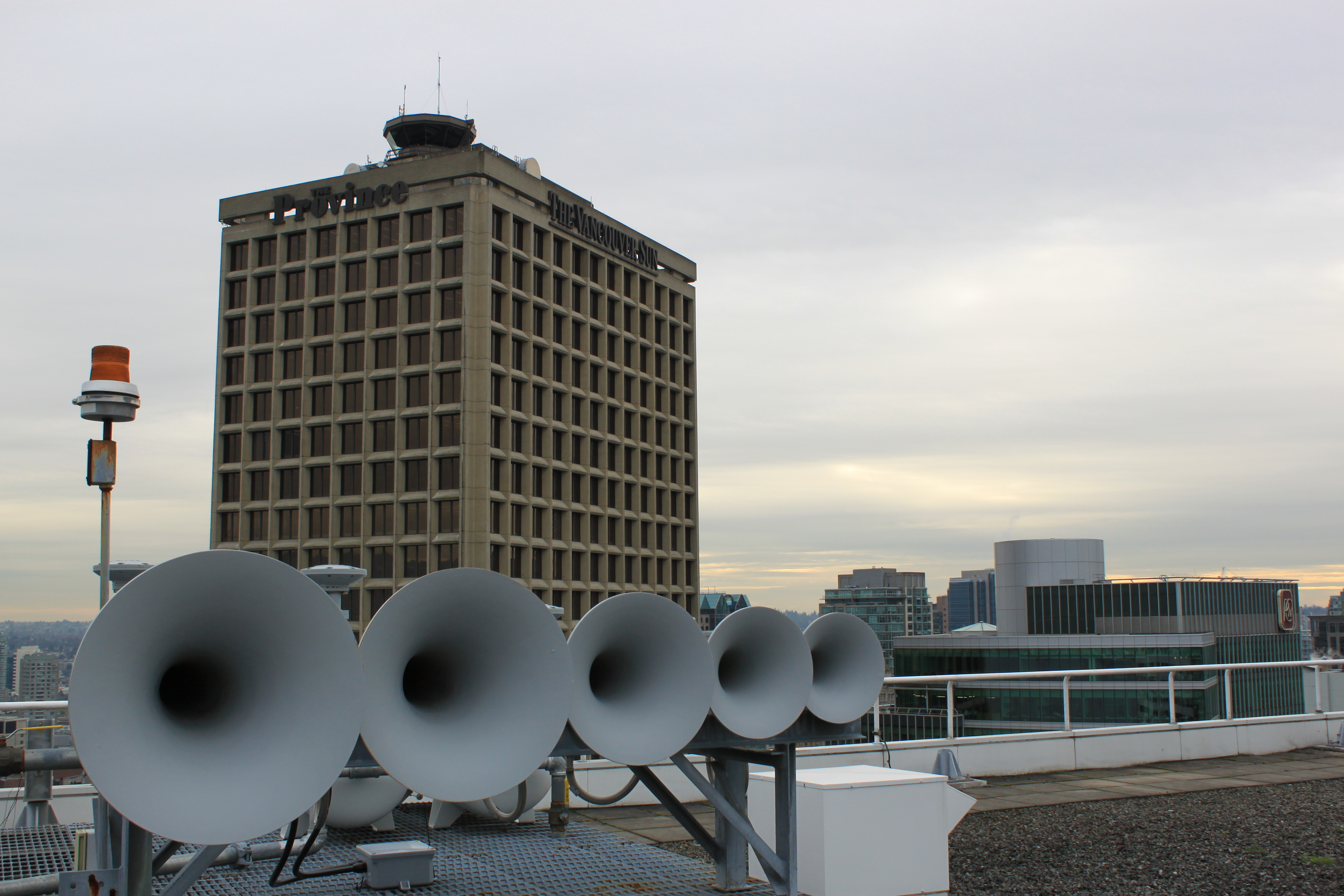
The building as seen from the Heritage Horns atop Canada Place

The building was fully owned by Cadillac Fairview until 2017, when the real estate company sold a 50% stake in its Vancouver portfolio, split evenly between the Ontario Pension Board and Workplace Safety and Insurance Board.

Real estate investment firm Colliers International occupies four floors and has been located in the building since its completion in 1973. Postmedia newspapers the Vancouver Sun and The Province operated out of the building from 1997 to 2017, initially occupying eight floors but shrinking to three floors over the years. As of 2024, software company Alida (formerly Vision Critical) occupies the mezzanine.

On top of the building sits the Vancouver Harbour Control Tower, which is responsible for guiding the floatplanes that take off and land on the Burrard Inlet. At 142 metres high, it was the tallest air traffic control tower in the world as of 2019.

== See also ==
- List of tallest buildings in Vancouver
- Project 200
- Vancouver Harbour Control Tower
