= Vancouver Harbour Control Tower =

Air traffic control tower in Vancouver, Canada

Coordinates: 49°17′11″N 123°06′44″W

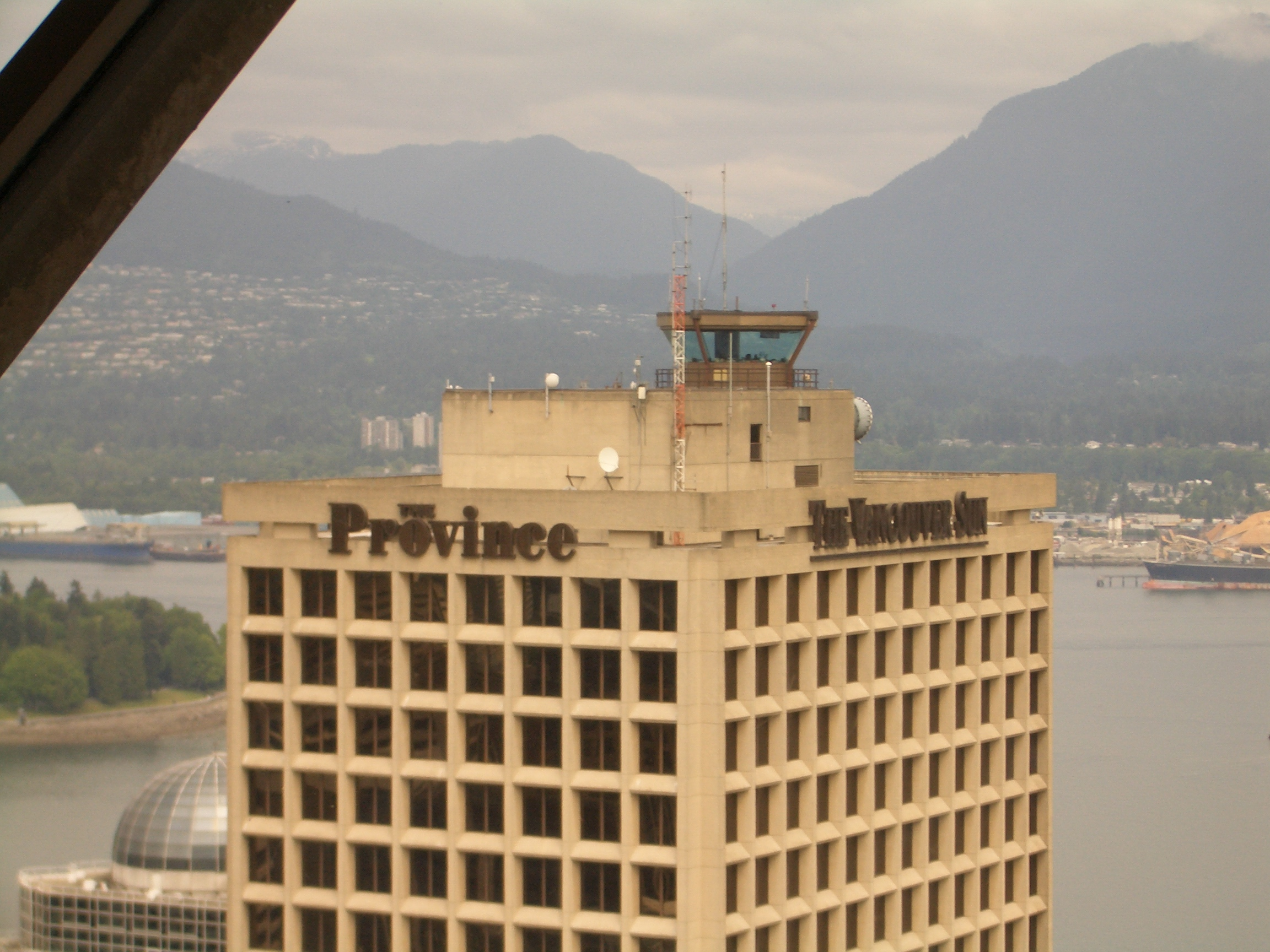
Vancouver Harbour Control Tower

The Vancouver Harbour Air Control Tower, which serves Vancouver Harbour Water Airport (CYHC), is placed on top of the 142 m (466 ft) skyscraper Granville Square in Vancouver, British Columbia, Canada. Built in 1973 it remains the highest air traffic control tower in the world, in the city with one of the world's highest levels of seaplane activity.

In 2009 the tower handled 54,741 aircraft movements, the 32nd busiest control tower in Canada. It is also the 8th busiest airport in BC and the busiest water aerodrome in Canada. Itinerant aircraft movements (from one airport to another) for the aerodrome were 54,711 while local movements were 30. The small number of local movements is because float training and circuits are discouraged in the busy Vancouver Harbour.

The major floatplane operators are Harbour Air and Seair Seaplanes. Both of these operators offer scheduled passenger service to Victoria Harbour and Nanaimo Harbour on Vancouver Island. In addition, they fly charters to many small communities and harbours along the BC coast. Kenmore Air also operates out of Vancouver Harbour. Floatplanes commonly seen in Vancouver Harbour include de Havilland Beavers (DHC2), de Havilland Turbine Otters (DH3T) and de Havilland Twin Otters (DHC6).

Helicopter activity is also extensive in Vancouver Harbour with the floating Vancouver Harbour Heliport located on the waterfront, east of the control tower. One of the busiest public heliports in Canada, the Harbour Heliport is used by Helijet and other helicopter operators such as Talon Helicopters and Blackcomb Helicopters. Helijet offers scheduled passenger service to Victoria Harbour Heliport and Nanaimo Harbour using 12-passenger Sikorsky S-76 helicopters.

Aviation activity in Vancouver Harbour also includes many overflying aircraft. These include recreational scenic flights, photo flights, banner tows, traffic watch aircraft and police aircraft.
