= T200 telex and data switching system =

Pioneering telex exchanges

The T200 telex switching system produced by Hasler Ltd of Berne broke new ground in the modernization and spread of Telex. During the 1970s and 1980s it pioneered the introduction of digital equipment and the deployment of Stored Program Controlled (SPC) Exchanges, gradually replacing the former electromechanical telex networks.

The first T200 telex exchange went into service in February 1972 in Hong Kong on the telex network of the telecommunications company Cable & Wireless. It was the world's first stored-program-controlled telex switch in public service with call switching over a digital data bus.

A special feature of the T200 was a computer architecture designed to ensure uninterrupted operation based on three synchronously running processors with majority monitoring. (The Apollo Moon landing program also used Triple Modular Redundancy (TMR) for failure-critical equipment). Over 50 T200 systems went into in service in 16 countries between 1972 and 2020, with a focus on Hong Kong, Switzerland and the People's Republic of China.

== Initial development ==
In December 1967 Cable & Wireless (London) awarded Hasler Ltd the order for the delivery and commissioning of a Telex switching system with 750 lines in Hong Kong. It was based on a technical description created by Hasler in 1966 entitled Electronic Telex Exchange. Hasler was a world leader in the 1960s with its TOR system (Telex over Radio) and was thus well known to Cable & Wireless. This first T201 exchange went into operation on 2 February 1972.

=== Hardware ===
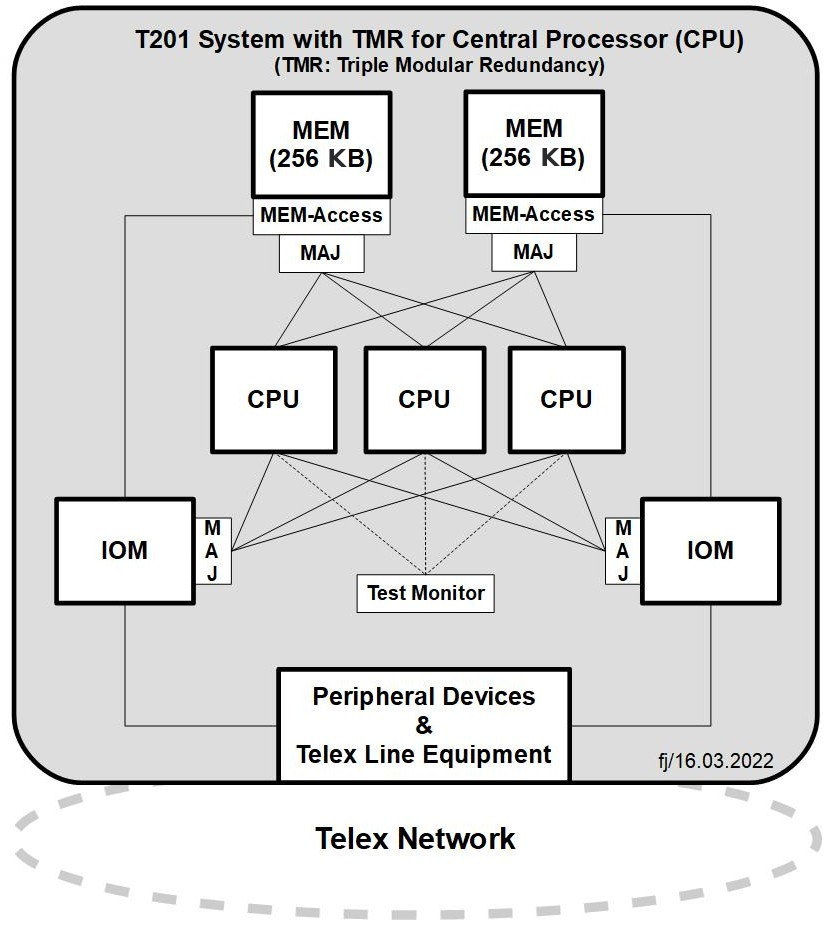
T201 System Architecture, showing triplicated CPUs

System architecture:

For the purpose of almost 100 percent operational availability, a redundancy concept was implemented with triplicated processors whose signals were constantly monitored using majority circuitry. This prevented hardware errors that might occur in the processors from affecting the behaviour of the system. All other system elements that were important for central operation were duplicated and protected by parity checks.

Technology:

With the exception of the central core memory and the input/output devices, all of the electronic equipment was developed by Hasler using transistor-transistor logic (TTL).

Features:

The memory addressing capacity was 256 kB. The clock for real-time processing was 10 ms. The (32-bit parallel) transfer bus allowed the connection of up to 16 line processors, each with 256 lines, i.e. a maximum of 4096 lines.

=== Software ===
The TELMOS assembler language developed by Hasler was designed for efficient real-time programming and optimal use of the limited memory capacity of 256 kB. Among the software functions implemented were the operating system, call handling with various signalling types and subscriber services, destination searching and routing, call data recording and utilities. With the exception of the CCITT standards, the functions were originally only described in summary form and had to be defined in detail during development. The development of a completely new, complex real-time software for such a system was a major challenge. The British software company Scicon Ltd was called in during 1970 to ensure prompt delivery.

=== First Exchange in Hong Kong ===
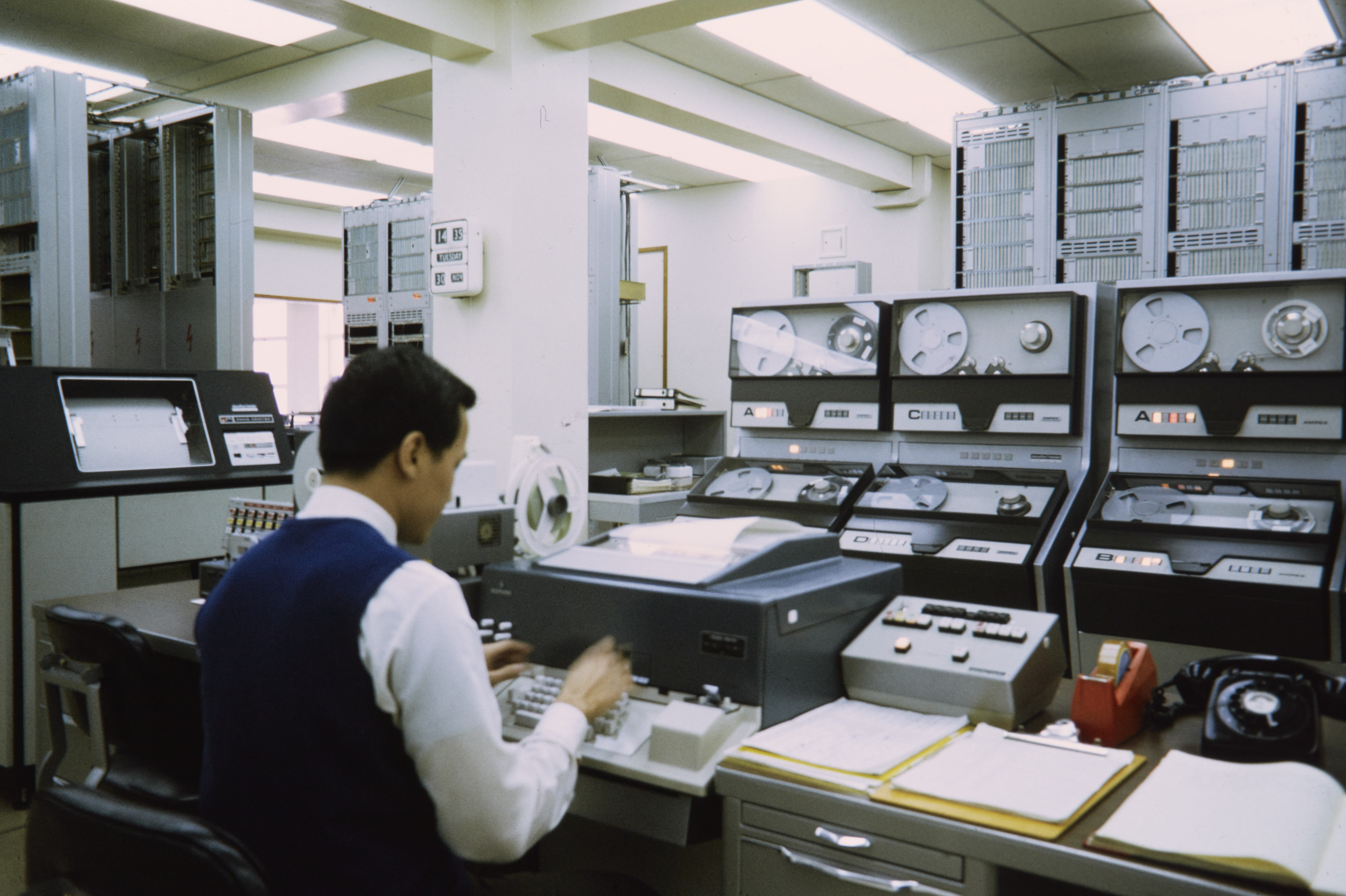
The T201 Telex Exchange in Hong Kong, 1971

The first T201 exchange went into service on 2 February 1972 in Hong Kong at Old Mercury House. In August 1972, a second T201 switching system was installed, which began full operation in 1973. A noteworthy feature was the first Hasler data link (2.048 Mb/s PCM) for connecting telex subscribers in Kowloon via a radio link across Hong Kong harbour

== T202: More capacity ==
Increased requirements for traffic performance and functionality were predictable. It was decided to upgrade the original system as follows:

- twin processors with load sharing
- expansion of memory capacity to 1 MB (core memory)
- introduction of visual display units and disk storage
- line equipment for a maximum of 32,000 lines (at 50 Bd)
- handling of 300Bd character data for the Telex and Data Switching Network of the Swiss Post, Telephone and Telegraph Company (PTT)

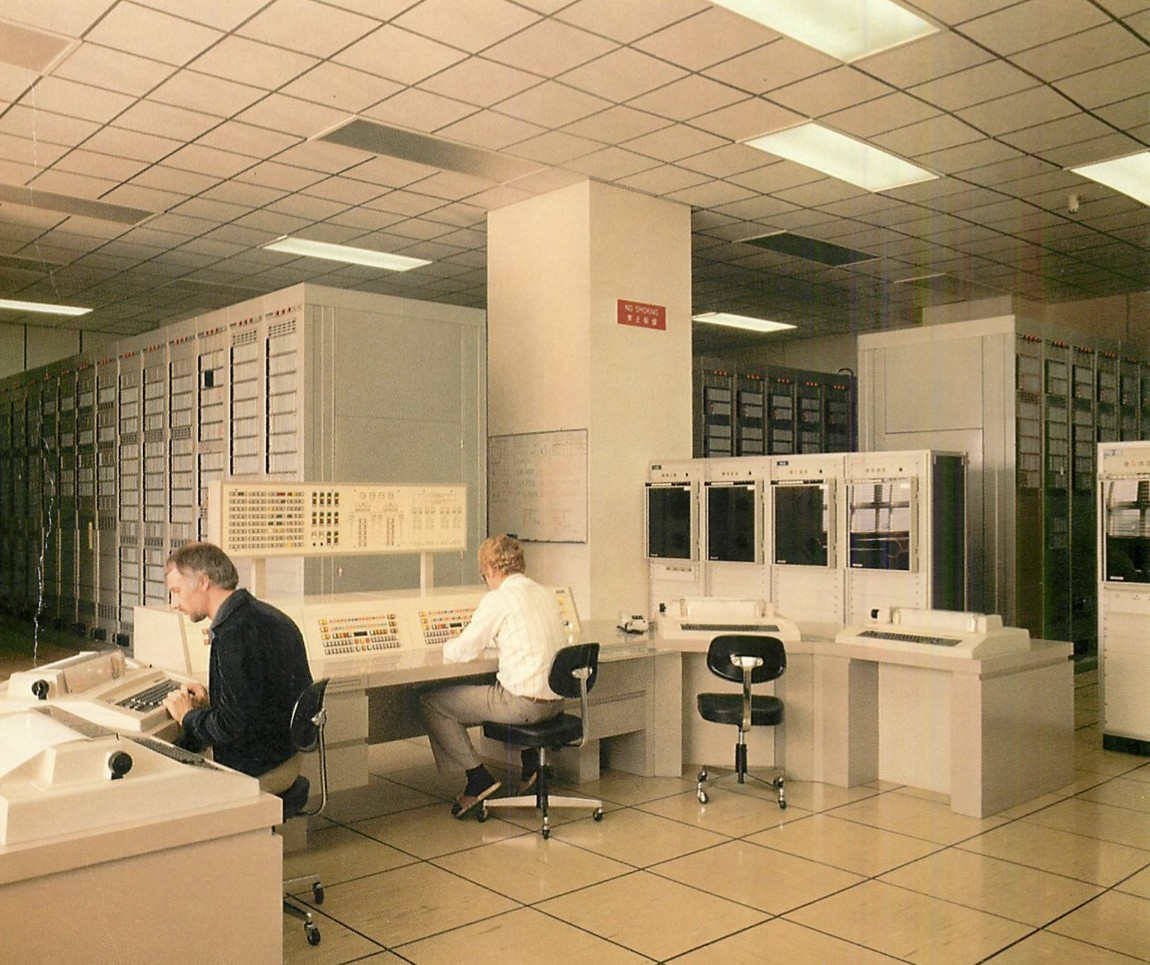
Installing the HK-D T202 Telex Exchange in Hong Kong, 1981

The first twin-processor T202 telex exchange went into service in Sydney in late 1975 as an international gateway for the Overseas Telecommunications Commission (OTC(A)). Another gateway exchange followed in 1979 for the Bureau Télégraphique International (BTI) in Paris. In Switzerland, the successful transition from the electro-mechanical telex network to the new Electronic Data Switching Network (EDWA) began in 1979 with the T202 exchanges in Zurich and Geneva. In Hong Kong telex experienced strong growth and customer needs for new subscriber services such as Store and Forward, and an automatic information service. For this purpose, a T202 twin processor system was put into operation in 1979, followed in 1982 by a second T202 system.

== T203: Updated Technology ==
The T203 computer developed as part of the Swiss Integrated Telecommunications Project (Integriertes Fernmelde-System ― IFS) was released in 1981. Among the advantages of the T203 system were an improved performance-to-volume ratio of 10:1 and the replacement of expensive core memory with semiconductor memory using 64 kB chips. Further expansion of the Swiss Telex and Data network was carried out with the T203 processor. The T202 processors already in use were replaced. The first T203 switching system went into operation in Basle in 1984. By 1989 the entire Swiss PTT telex network was connected to T203 exchanges.

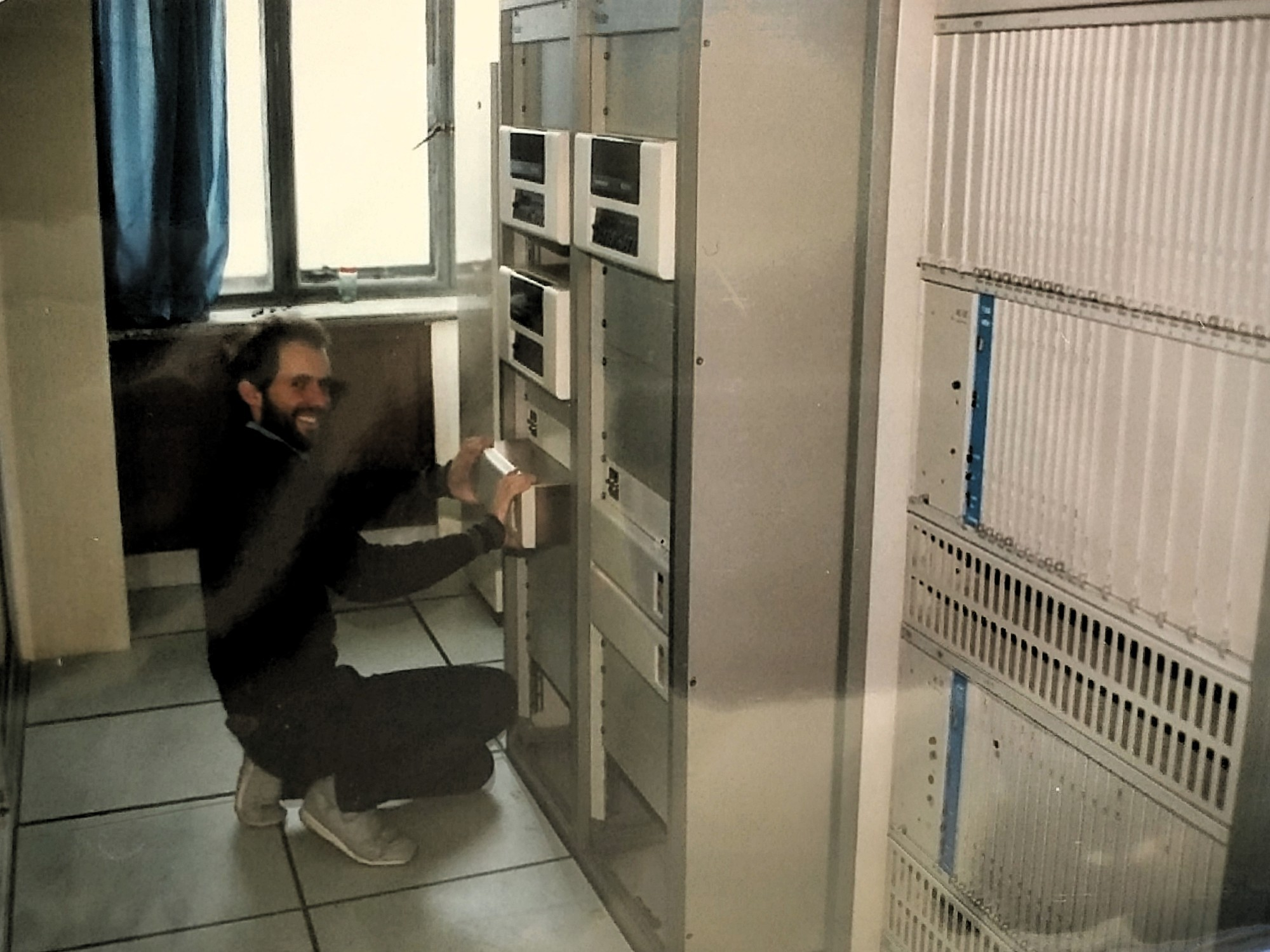
Hasler staff installing the T203 Telex switching equipment at the Telecommunications Building, Wuhan, China,1988

At the beginning of 1985, a cooperation agreement was concluded in the People's Republic of China for the expansion of the telex network using T203 exchanges. The first T203 exchange began operating in Taiyuan in December 1985. In 1989, the Chinese Ministry of Posts and Telecommunications ordered an integrated telex and telegram switching system, named TM203, which was introduced in several Chinese telecommunications headquarters. By 1997, 17 T203 systems had been commissioned in China.

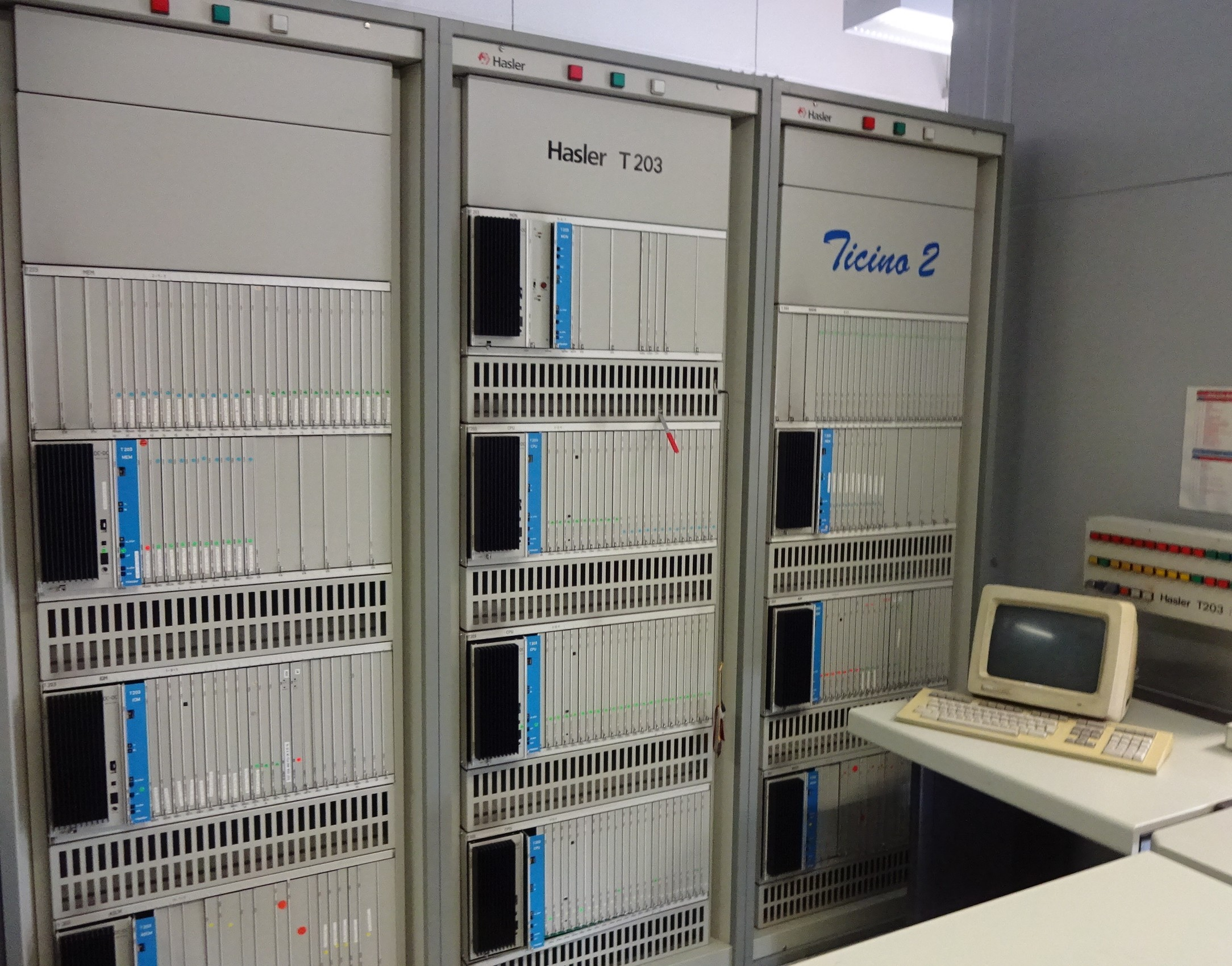
T203 Telex exchange, Lugano, Switzerland, 2020

In the early 1980s, the imminent replacement of the Telex service seemed likely. A new Teletex service was introduced in Germany in 1981. It was expected that this would replace the telex service over time. Hasler used Teletex/Telex converters with the T203 for intercommunication between the new Teletex service and Telex. Converters for X.25 interfaces to message systems (TPAD) and integrated R.101 multiplexers and subscriber concentrators controlled by the T203 exchange were also developed.

== Decline of Telex ==
From 1987 the telex service experienced a decline in the number of subscribers. Ascom, the successor to Hasler AG, was planning a long-term withdrawal from the T200 business. The orderly withdrawal included compliance with existing customer obligations, exploiting risk-free business opportunities that continued to arise and ensuring long-term maintenance, especially for the software. This strategy was successful. Further T203 systems continued to be delivered until 1997.

== The final 20 years – SwissTelex ==
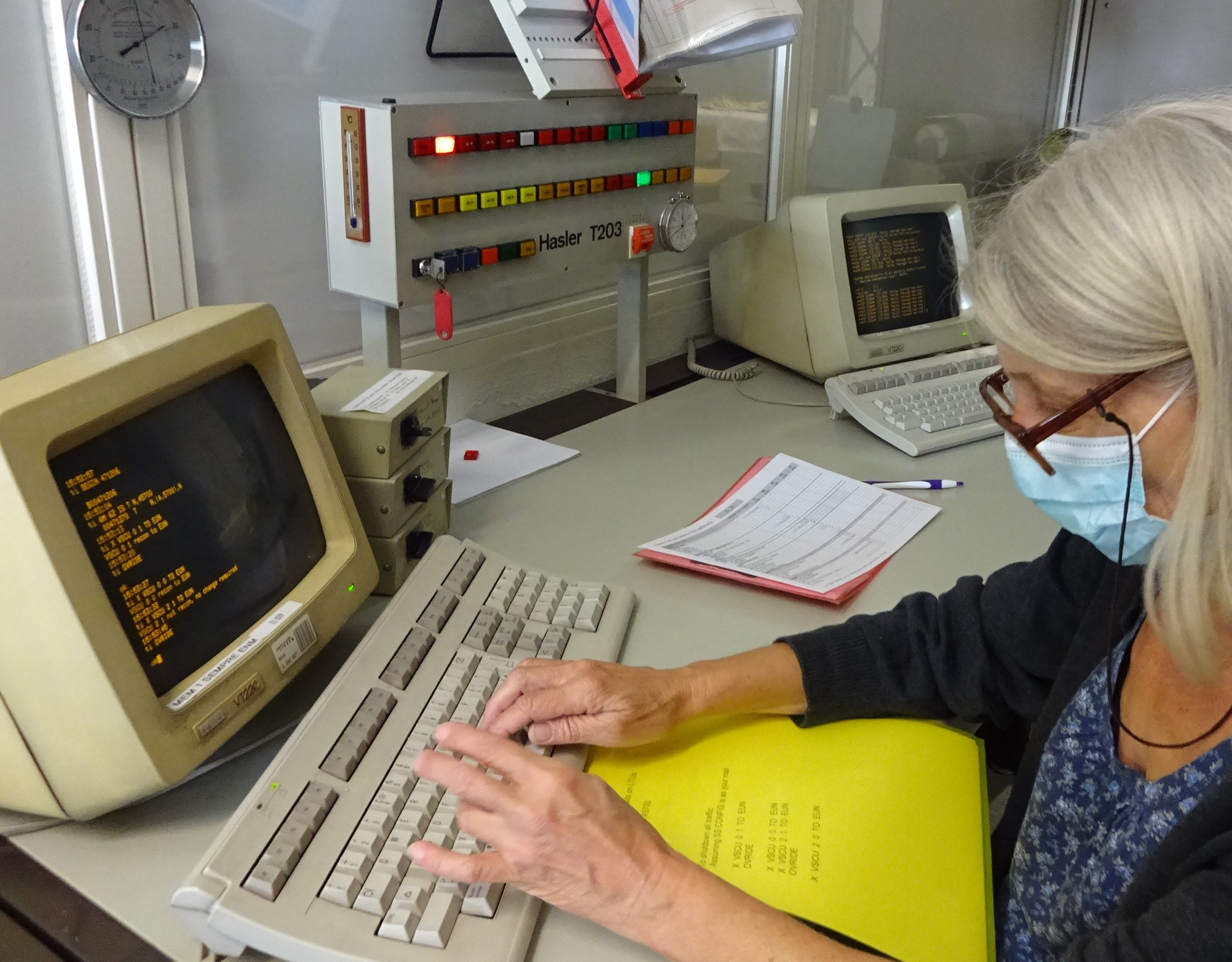
T203 Telex exchange, Lugano, 2020: Entering the command for decommissioning

As already planned by Swiss Telecom PTT in 1994, all Swiss telex connections were connected to the remaining T203 exchange in Lugano by 1997. Thanks to the liberalization of telecommunications services, it had become possible over time, with the help of license agreements, to also operate a telex service for subscribers connected abroad. Software in the T203 system enabled the creation of virtual telex networks. In 2006, Swisscom, as the former owner of the Swiss telex network, encouraged the establishment of a new private company, SwissTelex, to operate the T203 telex exchange in Lugano, which still had around 7,000 subscribers. As a result, in 2015, this T203 system still served users from 20 countries, including UK subscribers transferred from British Telecom and Mercury Communications.

On August 31, 2020, this T203 telex exchange in Lugano was the last exchange of its kind to be decommissioned. The triplicated processor of this system is kept in the Museum for Communication in Berne.
