= CNCP Telecommunications =

Former telecommunications and telegraph company

- Industry: Telecommunications
- Predecessor: CN Telegraph, CP Telegraphs
- Founded: 1967; 59 years ago
- Defunct: May 1990; 36 years ago
- Fate: Merged with Rogers Communications.
- Successor: Unitel, AT&T Canada, Allstream, Zayo
- Headquarters: Etobicoke, Ontario, Canada
- Products: Telegrams, Fax, Telex
- Brands: TelePost, Facsroute, Mach III, Infodat

CNCP Telecommunications (Canadian National-Canadian Pacific Telecommunications) was an electrical telegraph operator and later a telecom company, which operated between 1967 and 1990.

CNCP was created as a joint venture between the Canadian National Railway and the Canadian Pacific Railway in the era when telegraph operation was declining and maintaining two separate networks was no longer profitable. The new company also began several expansions into new markets, first with a Montreal to Vancouver microwave relay network carrying voice and data, and later, its replacement with fibre optic links.

Rogers Communications purchased a major stake in the company in 1984, and CN sold its remaining share in 1988. The network was taken over entirely by Rogers in 1990, and renamed it Unitel Communications in a bid to enter the commercial long distance market. This division changed hands several times from 2002 to 2012 when it was renamed Allstream.

== History ==
=== Beginnings ===
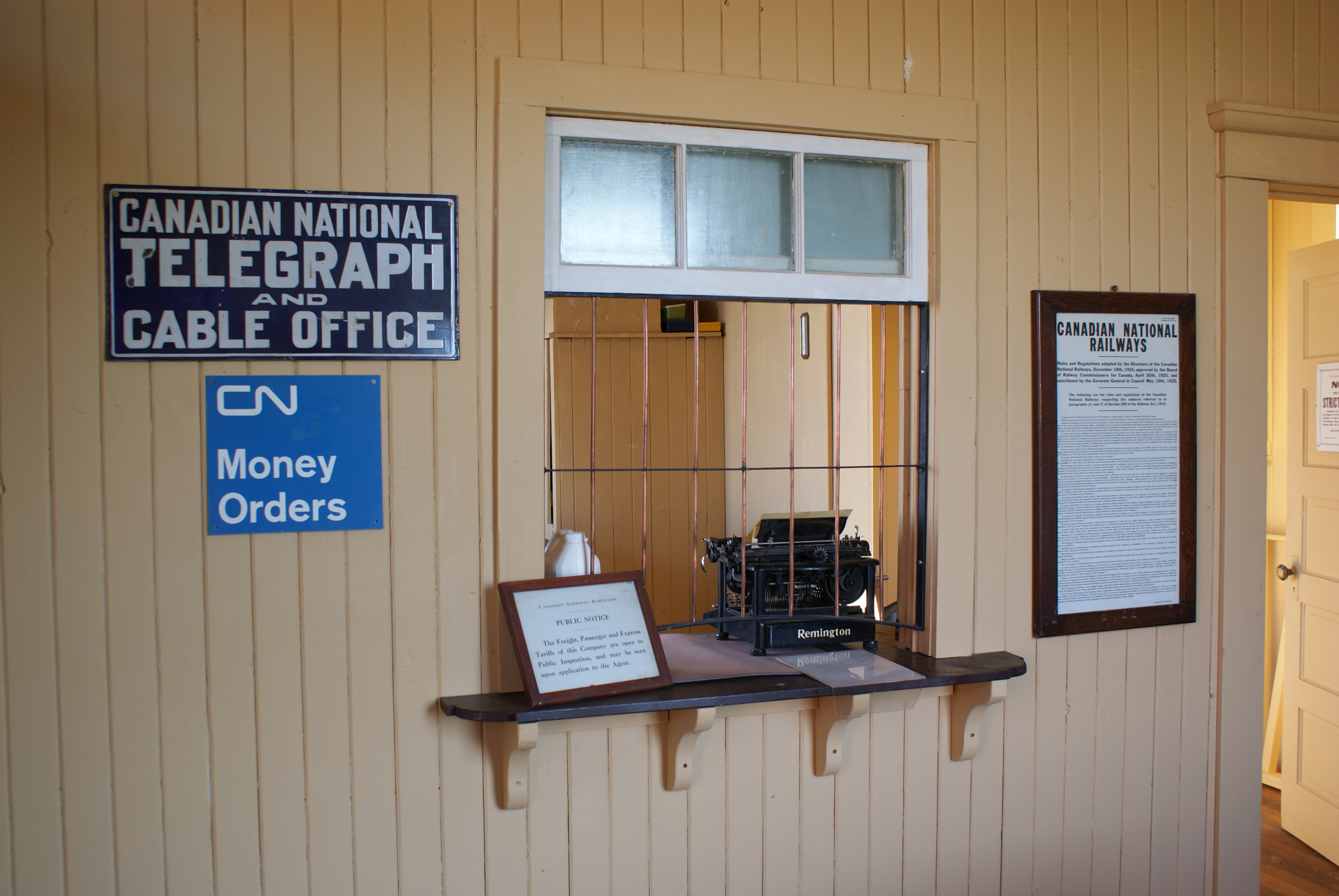
Restored CNCP counter on display at the Saskatchewan Railway Museum

Beginning in 1967, the different networks used by the two railway companies (CN Telegraph interchanged traffic with the Postal Telegraph Cable Company in the US while CPR Telegraphs networked with Western Union) were replaced by a single corporate entity. The two networks, former rivals, had been co-operating increasingly since the 1930s.

The next year, CNCP and TCTS (Trans Canada Telephone System, later Telecom Canada) published a brief, stating that they could work together in financing a Canadian telecommunications satellite so long as the federal government also had a stake in the project.

TelePost was a joint venture between CNCP and Canada Post that began in 1973. Using the service, an individual or company could compose a message electronically, then have it delivered by a postal carrier the next business day.

The last commercial telegraph operator with the company west of Thunder Bay (working in Regina) retired from the company in September 1971, with the six operators in Eastern Canada leaving soon after.

In 1973, CNCP added the Infodat data service, making it up to 90% cheaper to transfer teletype or computer data by using time-division multiplexing (TDM) and digital transmission.

In 1974 the Canadian Transport Commission (CTC) approved an 11% wholesale rate increase for telegrams, but rejected 9% on top of the granted increase.

=== Early telecom ===
In 1978, CNCP appeared before the Canadian Radio-television and Telecommunications Commission (CRTC). In their written filings with the commission, released a day before a second phase of hearings into the interconnect issue, they stated that they may have to completely go out of business if they are not allowed to interconnect with Bell Canada and other telcos. In its response to CNCP and the CRTC, Bell said that if CNCP wins approval for connection between the two carriers, Bell would increase its rates and seek government subsidies.

On May 17, 1979, the CRTC released its breakthrough Telecom Decision 1979-11, allowing CNCP to interconnect with the Bell Canada network. At this point, CNCP was no longer a telegraph company and emerged as an early telecom company. The CRTC directed Bell Canada that it was prohibited from refusing connections between the two networks. A month later, Bell Canada announced that it intended to appeal the decision, stating that they would lose $140 million a year from competition with CNCP. Cabinet upheld the decision.

Due to changes in technology towards electronic communications and fewer telegrams being sent, the company closed seven telegraph offices in Canada in January 1980: Prince Rupert, Vernon, Cornwall, Sherbrooke, Rouyn-Noranda, and the Gaspe region.

Infotex, a new service introduced in 1980, used dedicated word processors connected to the Bell Canada–CNCP network to enable speedy transmission of documents across the country. Telenews, on a trial basis to 500 customers, featured The Canadian Press newswire service, with regular updates every hour. Telenews was carried via the Telex network with a flat rate of 55 cents per minute.

After journalist Jeanne Sauvé noted "pay tv is inevitable" in the 1970s, the CRTC and the Department of Communications built a policy framework to accommodate future pay television services. CNCP leased a satellite channel to cable consortium Canadian Satellite Network Inc. (CSN), which was created by 50 Canadian cable television companies and headed by Kevin Shea. This carried two programming blocks from TVOntario: Galaxie, featuring four hours of children's programs; and Vista, featuring a three-hour weekly series of music, interviews, and science programming. Prior to the announcement of TVO's Galaxie and Vista, CSN had carried the Canadian House of Commons broadcasts since 1979. CSN's wish was that the CBC would take over the responsibilities of the House of Commons broadcasts, which by 1992 was given back to the cable companies. and became present day CPAC.

=== Mergers ===
Until this time, CNCP had operated financially as two separate entities (CN and CP). The two companies merged their telecommunications divisions in January 1981. After the CRTC approved, J. G. Sutherland was named president and CEO of the company.

Intelpost was a national and international fax service begun in early 1981 and managed by CNCP and Canada Post. A person wanting to send a document requiring more than simple text – charts, drawings, and other types of graphics – could send it from a few main post office locations, originally limited to Toronto, Montreal, Ottawa, Halifax, Winnipeg, Calgary, and Edmonton. Documents within Canada were sent via the microwave network. Those sent to the US or Europe were transmitted via satellite.

During the Canada Post strike of 1981, telecommunications carriers noted an increase in long-distance voice, data and fax usage. These services somewhat circumvented the need for the strike to resolve. CNCP reported sales increases of 25% for telegrams and 67% for Telex equipment during the month of July, which was usually a slack month for the hardware.

A 40% stake of CNCP was acquired by Rogers Communications in 1984 and CP acquired CN's stake. The company logo was updated in April 1984, removing the word Telecommunications.

Undaunted by the CRTC's unwillingness to allow competition in voice communications in Canada, the company applied to the CRTC for "tariff revisions" relating to providing electronic mail and "office communication services". The company had applied to the CRTC to have Canadian telecommunications regulations changed so that businesses and consumers would be able to choose between their regular telephone company and CNCP Telecommunications. The CRTC released their decision in August 1985, denying the company the go-ahead to provide mass-market communications to Canadians.

CNCP announced in April 1986 that it had connected Toronto and Montreal with 12 strands of fibre optic cable and that implementation of this technology would lead to a 30–40% reduction in long-distance telephone costs to consumers. The Hudson's Bay Company was the first to use the network to transmit a high volume of data.

In the summer of 1987, CNCP had to request that the CRTC direct Bell Canada to provide interconnections between the company and Bell Canada's connections to the United States to comply with CRTC's Telecom Decision 1979-11. A company in Toronto had requested 10 foreign exchange lines to a Sprint telecom switch in Buffalo, New York. In addition to this request, CNCP wanted exemption from over-regulation having to do with its services. At the same time, CNCP completed Dialcom, a digital microwave link which extended from Toronto, Ontario, to Calgary and Edmonton, Alberta. Dialcom allowed for exchange of e-mail messages, regardless of hardware equipment.

=== Divestment and Unitel rebranding ===
CN sold its share of the network for $235 million as the partnership with CP was dissolved in December 1988. Rogers renamed the company Unitel Communications Incorporated in May 1990.

Unitel applied for tariffs (fee schedule) for DS-1 telecom services (256 kbit/s, 384 kbit/s, 512 kbit/s, 768 kbit/s) and DS-2 6.312 Mbit/s over T2 lines in May 1990 and marketed as Mach III. A T1 cable carries up to 24 DS0 voice/data signals at a speed of 1.544 Mbit/s per 24 channel grouping. A T2 cable carries up to 96 DS0 voice/data signals at a speed of 6.312 Mbit/s per 96 channel grouping.

Unitel was later acquired by AT&T Canada, now known as Allstream (now part of Zayo Group).

== Services ==
CNCP provided a multitude of electronic data services to businesses across Canada. Some of these included:

- Connections with 34,000 teleprinters (Telex) in Canada and connections to other Telex networks around the world
- Financial transactions involving money orders
- Fax and other electronic data for Transport Canada, the RCMP, and the Canadian Armed Forces
- RTTY message relay service to northern Canada
- Transmitting wire photos from The Canadian Press and Southam News Services
- Voice reports from Broadcast News
- Transmitting telegrams (TelePost) across Canada and around the world

== CNCP Facsroute ==
CNCP FacsRoute was a Canadian telecommunications network that delivered fax documents, circa 1988. Initially a store and forward fax service was provided over an X.25 data network, and presented to the market with all the traditional "value added" arguments; it peaked at $2 million revenue and 2,000 subscribers.

A year later, the regulator allowed real time FacsRoute, which attracted $40 million of revenue and 50,000 subscribers of the 300,000 fax terminals then in Canada, doing so in nine months. Real time FacsRoute was provided over a 64 kbit/s bypass GSTN via "voice busters" which cut the dialed connection after a cumulative 70 seconds of speech per call: a remarkably "value subtracted" way of bringing a transcontinental 64 kbit/s service to market, but a 20-fold increase in business over the store and forward FacsRoute Plus.

== See also ==
- MCI
- Western Union
- AT&T
- Bell Canada
