= Mailgram =

Communication service created by Western Union (1970–2006)

A mailgram is a type of telegraphic message which is delivered to the recipient by the post office. Mailgrams are received at a mailgram center by telephone, teletypewriter service or computer. Each message is placed in a special envelope and dispatched to the local post office for delivery with the mail.

Western Union invented the mailgram in 1970 and registered the trademark "Mailgram". Service via Westar, Western Union's own communications satellite, was introduced in 1974.

The advantage of mailgrams over postal mail is speed and verifiability of transmission. In the late 20th century they were widely used in official notifications and legal transactions. Their advantage over full-rate telegrams was lower cost while still maintaining the look and feel of an important telegram. The mailgram quickly became a widely used medium for business-to-consumer communications.

Although iTelegram still provides a mailgram service in the United States, Western Union discontinued all telegram messaging, including Mailgram, in 2006.
