= Pipelines in Canada =

Component of Canadian energy infrastructure

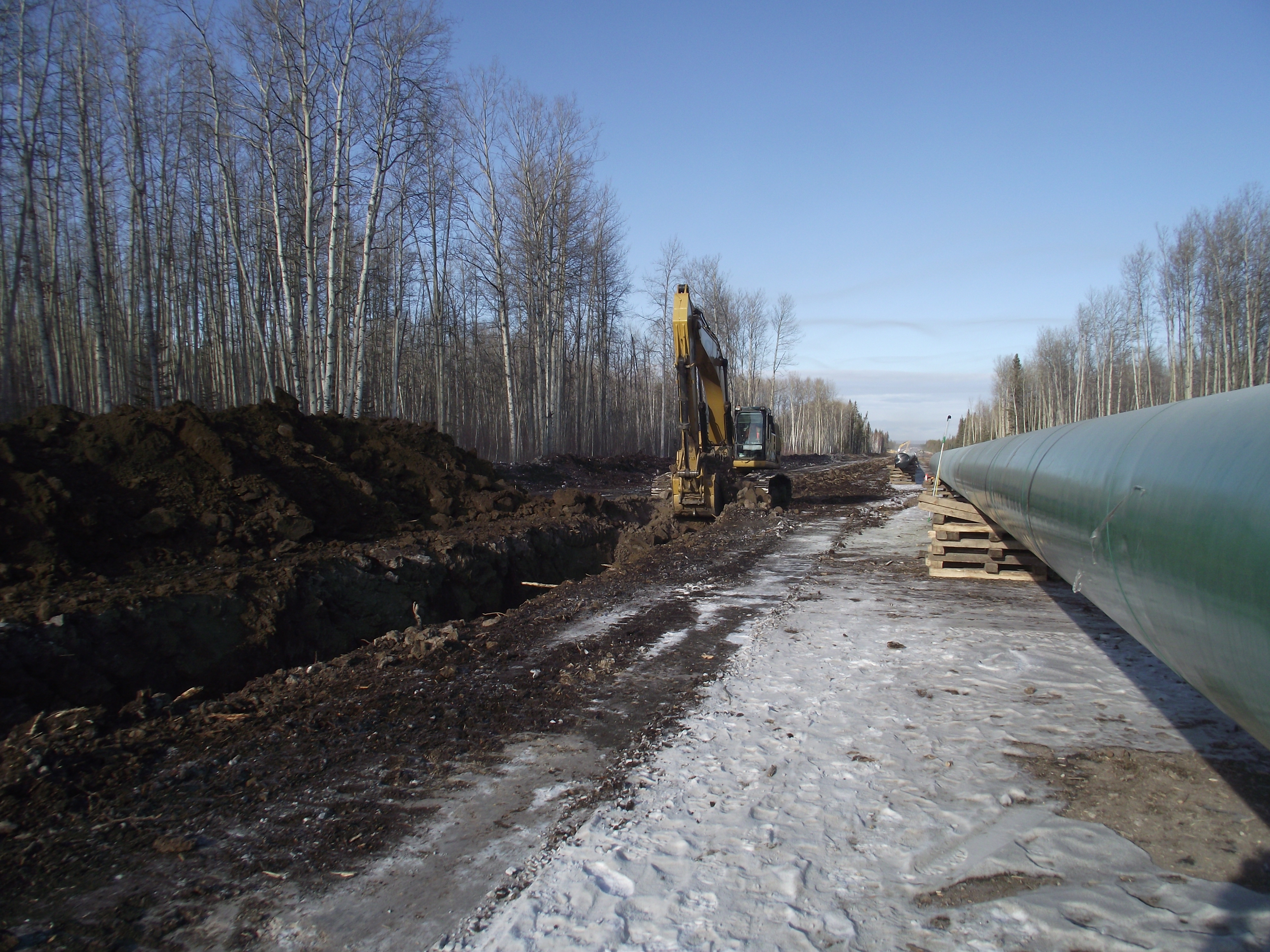
Pipeline construction shown in Alberta

Pipelines in Canada are important components of energy infrastructure in Canada as the majority of natural gas and oil reserves are located in landlocked Alberta and need to be transported to ports or terminals to access larger markets.

== Background ==
Early pipelines were built in Ontario during the 1850s to transport crude oil from nearby wells. However, Canada's modern pipeline system began following the discovery of Leduc No. 1 in Alberta in 1947. Since then, Alberta's economy has been energy reliant, with oil and natural gas production expanded after major pipelines were constructed in the 1950s to connect Western Canadian energy resources with domestic and international markets. The majority of Canada's natural gas production is exported to the United States. In the 21st century, pipelines in Canada became politicized, especially during the premiership of Justin Trudeau, whose government's environmental policies proved unpopular in Alberta. While some pipeline projects were cancelled because of environmental concerns, legal challenges, market conditions, and Indigenous rights issues, the Trans Mountain Expansion was completed in 2024 after the federal government purchased the project in 2018. Pipelines remain a vital part of Canada's economic development, while environmental protection and Indigenous consultation have received increased importance. During the premiership of Mark Carney, the construction of oil pipelines has been given increased importance due to the need for energy independence due to the 2025–2026 United States trade war with Canada and the 2026 Alberta independence referendum.

== Regulation and ownership ==
=== Regulation ===
The Canadian federal government regulates around 10% (by length) of pipelines through the Canada Energy Regulator. The Regulator has precedence over provincial regulation when pipelines cross provincial or international boundaries.

Provincially each provinces has its own regulator listed below:

Provincial Pipeline Regulators in Canada
Province	Ministry	Regulator
Alberta	Ministry of Energy (Alberta)	Alberta Energy Regulator
Ontario	Ministry of Energy (Ontario)	Ontario Energy Board
British Columbia	Ministry of Energy (British Columbia)	British Columbia Oil and Gas Commission
Saskatchewan	Ministry of Energy (Saskatchewan)	Ministry of Energy (Saskatchewan)
Manitoba	Directly supervised by Manitoba Legislature	Manitoba Public Utilities Board
New Brunswick	Ministry of Natural Resources (New Brunswick)	New Brunswick Energy and Utilities Board
Quebec	Multiple	Régie de l’énergie du Québec Régie du bâtiment du Québec Ministère de la Sécurité publique Ministère du Développement durable, de l’Environnement et de la Lutte contre les changements climatiques Ministère de la Justice Ministère des Forêts, de la Faune et des Parcs Société de l'assurance automobile du Québec Commission de la santé et de la sécurité du travail Commission de protection du territoire agricole du Québec Sûreté du Québec Bureau d’audiences publiques sur l’environnement Info Excavation
Newfoundland and Labrador	N/A	None (no pipelines are present in Newfoundland and Labrador)
Prince Edward Island	N/A	None (no pipelines are present in PEI)
Nova Scotia	Ministry of Finance (Nova Scotia)	Nova Scotia Utility and Review Board

== Rejected and abandoned pipelines ==
Proposed pipelines in Canada
Owner(s)	Name	Terminal	Terminal	Map	Status
TC Energy, ExxonMobil	Alaska gas pipeline	Alaska North Slope	Calgary, Alberta		Rejected
Enbridge	Enbridge Northern Gateway Pipelines	Bruderheim, Alberta	Kitimat, British Columbia		Rejected
Imperial Oil, The Aboriginal Pipeline Group, ConocoPhillips, Shell Canada, ExxonMobil	Mackenzie Valley Pipeline	Mackenzie Valley	Fort Simpson, Northwest Territories		Abandoned
TC Energy	Energy East	Hardisty, Alberta	Saint John, New Brunswick		Rejected
TC Energy	Keystone XL	Hardisty, Alberta	Patoka, Illinois, Port Arthur, Texas, Houston		Abandoned

== Proposed pipelines ==
Proposed pipelines in Canada
Owner(s)	Name	Terminal	Terminal	Map	Status	Status (as of date)
35 First Nations groups	Eagle Spirit Pipeline	Northern Alberta	Prince George, British Columbia		Applied for	
Enbridge	Enbridge Line 3	Hardisty, Alberta	Superior, Wisconsin		Applied for	
NW Infrastructure Limited Partnership	Prince Rupert Gas Transmission	Fort St. John, British Columbia	Prince Rupert, British Columbia		Approved by regulator - Awaiting final investment decision	
South Bow	Prairie Connector	Hardisty, Alberta	Phillips County, Montana		Applied for	
Proponent not yet selected	Northern Shield Energy Corridor	Hardisty, Alberta	Sarnia, Ontario		Feasibility study underway	
Alberta Petroleum Marketing Commission, Trans Mountain Corporation, Pembina Pipeline Corporation	Pacific Link	Bruderheim, Alberta	Roberts Bank, British Columbia		Announced	

== Operating pipelines ==
Pipelines in Canada
Owner(s)	Name	Substance	Terminal	Terminal	Map
Pembina	Alliance Pipeline	Natural gas			
Emera	Brunswick Pipeline	Natural gas	Saint John, New Brunswick	Woodland, Maine	
TC Energy	Gas Transmission Northwest	Natural gas	Kingsgate, British Columbia	Malin, Oregon	
TC Energy	Great Lakes Transmission	Natural gas			
TC Energy, Dominion Resources, KeySpan Corporation, New Jersey Resources Corporation, Energy East Corporation	Iroquois Pipeline	Natural gas			
Enbridge, Emera, ExxonMobil	Maritimes & Northeast Pipeline	Natural gas	Goldboro, Nova Scotia	Dracut, Massachusetts	
TC Energy, ONEOK Partners	Northern Border Pipeline	Natural gas			
Williams Companies	Northwest Pipeline	Natural gas			
TC Energy	TransCanada pipeline	Natural gas			
Emera	Brunswick Pipeline	Natural gas	Saint John, New Brunswick	Woodland, Maine	
SaskEnergy	TransGas pipeline	Natural gas			
Enbridge, DTE Energy Company	Vector Pipeline	Natural gas			
Portland Pipe Line Corporation (in the United States) Montreal Pipe Line Limited (in Canada)	Montreal—Portland pipeline	Oil	South Portland, Maine	Montreal, Quebec	
Enbridge	Canadian Mainline (Line 1, Line 2 A, Line 3, Line 4, Line 65, and Line 67)	Oil	Edmonton, Alberta	Gretna, Manitoba	
Enbridge	US Mainline (Line 1, Line 2 B, Line 3, Line 4, Line 5, Line 6, Line 14, Line 61, Line 62, Line 64, Line 67, Line 78)	Oil	Gretna, Manitoba	Sarnia, Ontario and Flanagan, Illinois	
Enbridge	Line 13 (Southern Lights pipeline)	Oil			
Enbridge	Line 72 (AOC Hanging Stone)	Oil			
Trans Mountain Corporation, a wholly owned subsidiary of the Canada Development Investment Corporation	Trans Mountain pipeline	Oil and refined petroleum liquids	Edmonton, Alberta	Burnaby, British Columbia	
TC Energy	Coastal GasLink Pipeline	Natural gas	Dawson Creek, British Columbia	Kitimat, British Columbia	

== Gallery ==
Pipeline Infrastructure in Canada
All Canadian Energy Regulator managed pipelines originating from Alberta

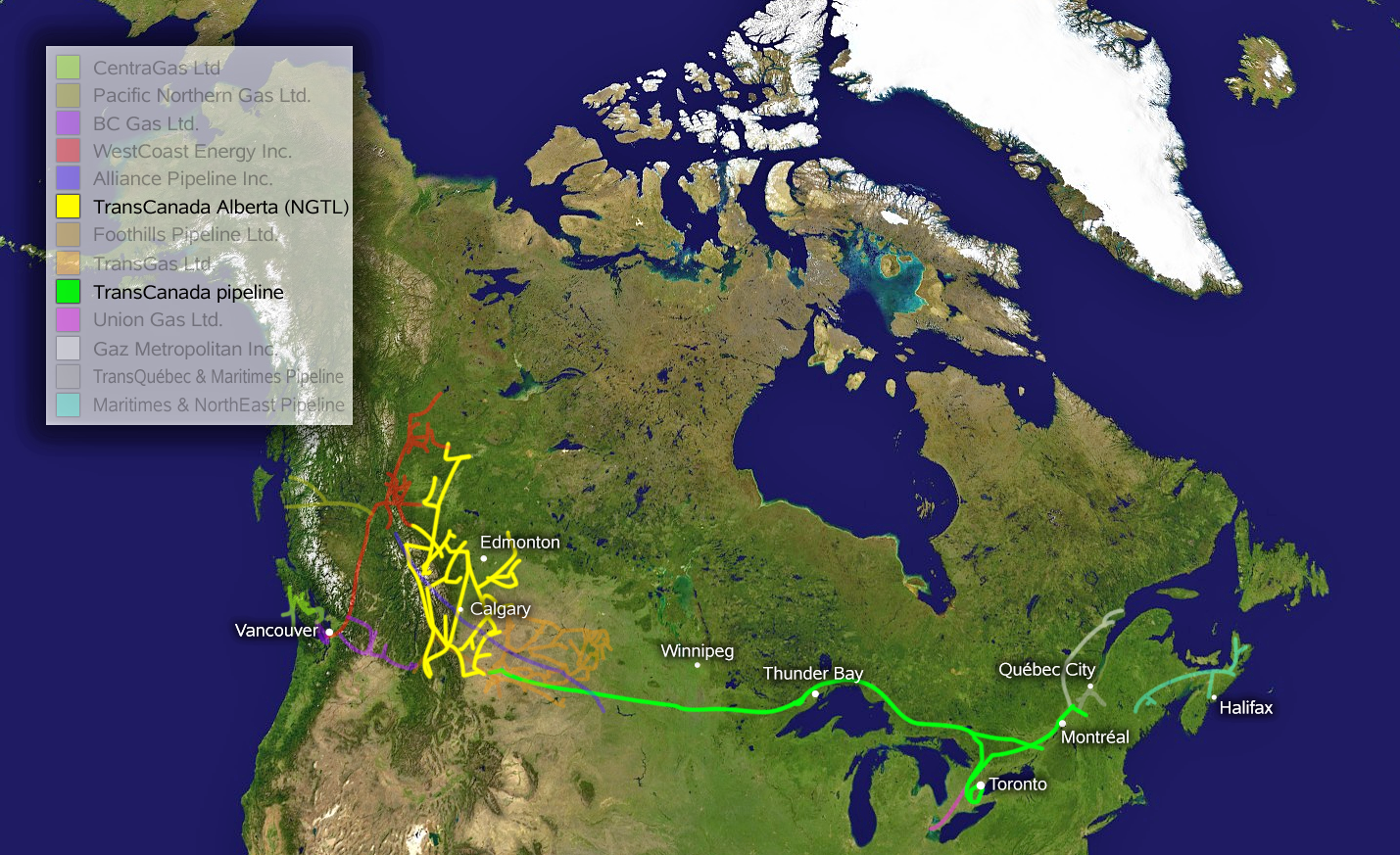
The TransCanada pipeline route
