= James S. Kinnear =

Canadian entrepreneur and philanthropist

James Kinnear
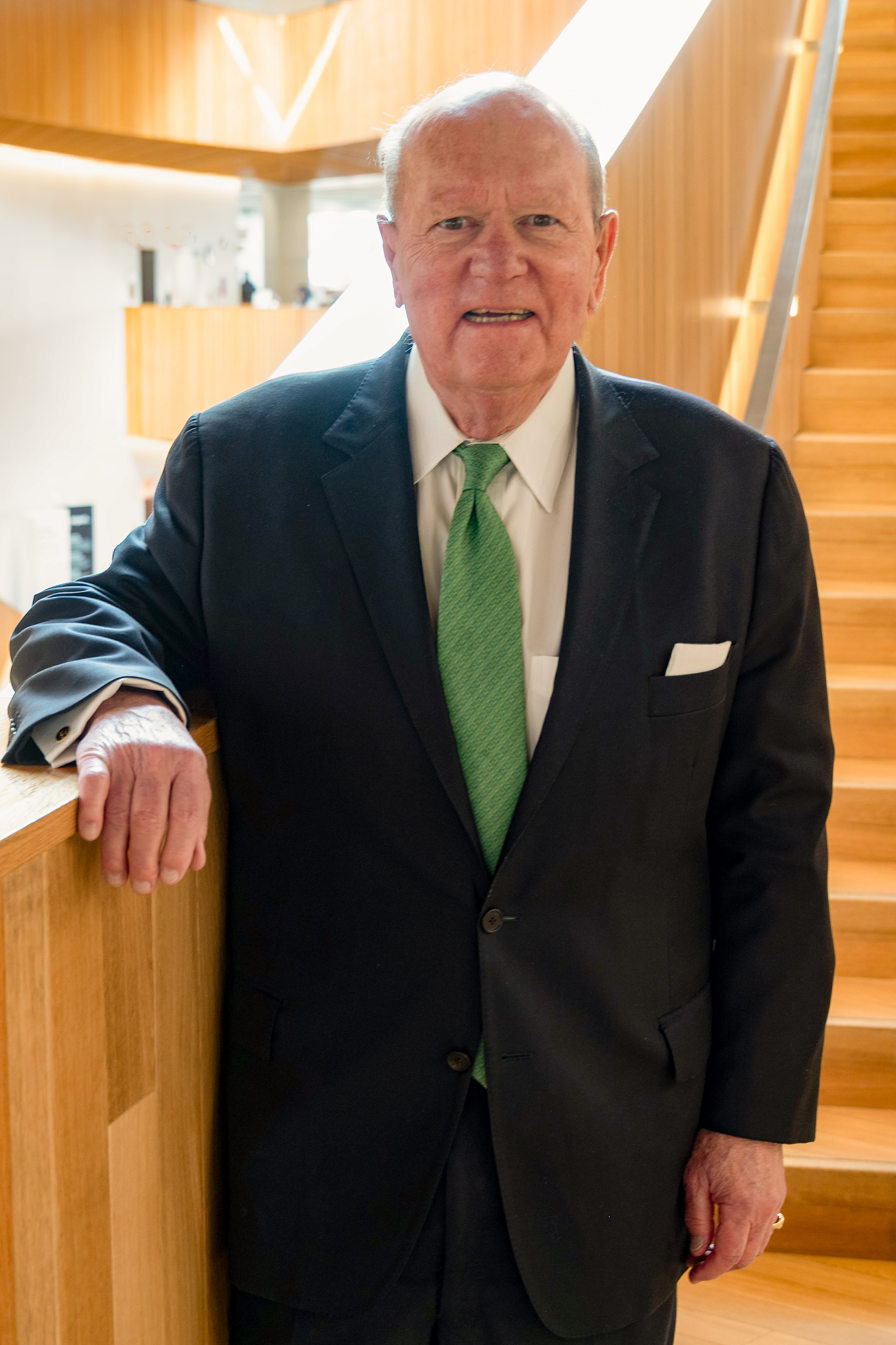
- Born: December 31, 1947 (age 78); Toronto, Ontario
- Occupations: Entrepreneur and philanthropist

James S. Kinnear (born December 31, 1947) is a Canadian entrepreneur and philanthropist. Kinnear was born in Toronto, Ontario, and grew up in Montreal and Toronto.

== Career ==
Kinnear graduated from the University of Toronto in 1969 with a Bachelor of Science degree and worked in the securities business in Toronto, London and Montreal until 1980. In 1979 he was awarded the Chartered Financial Analyst (CFA) designation. He subsequently moved to Calgary, Alberta where he established Kinnear Financial Consulting Limited in 1980 and then Pengrowth Management Limited in 1982.

Pengrowth Management Limited, a private company, initially initiated investments in oil and gas properties on behalf of pension fund clients. In December 1988, Pengrowth Management Limited launched Pengrowth Gas Income Fund (the name was later changed to Pengrowth Energy Trust) with an initial public offering of $12.5million, a new investment vehicle which permitted individual investors to be involved with oil and gas production without being exposed to the added risks of oil and gas exploration. Kinnear is recognized as a pioneer in the Canadian energy trust sector, and under his leadership Pengrowth Energy Trust grew into a $5 billion enterprise value.

Pengrowth Energy Trust acquired numerous oil and gas producing properties between 1989 and 2009 under the direction of James Kinnear and his company, Pengrowth Management Limited. Some of the more notable acquisitions include: Judy Creek/Swan Hills – acquired from Imperial Oil in 1997 for C$496 million; an interest in the Sable Offshore Energy Project – acquired in 2001 for C$265 million; the C$550 million acquisition of Murphy Canada assets in 2004; the Carson Creek purchase in 2006 – acquired from Imperial Oil for C$475million; and a C$1 billion acquisition of various assets from ConocoPhillipsin 2007. Additionally, Pengrowth Energy Trust combined with Esprit Energy Trust in 2006. At the time, Esprit Energy Trust’s market capitalization was over C$1.0 billion.

Upon his retirement from Pengrowth Energy Trust in 2009, Kinnear, along with other investors, established Caledonian Royalty Corporation, a private Canadian Corporation that purchases royalty interests in oil and gas properties. Caledonian Royalty Corporation currently holds royalty interests (royalties) in the oil and gas production of twelve Canadian energy companies.

== Community activity ==
Kinnear is active in the community, and is known for supporting various organizations that promote leadership, sports, culture, health and education. He has donated, and encouraged others to give, tens of millions of dollars to nonprofit and charitable initiatives.

Since 1992, he has chaired an annual golf tournament that has raised over C$10 million for the Calgary Health Trust. In January 2010, proceeds from this tournament were used to purchase a C$3.3 million surgical robot for the Rockyview General Hospital in Calgary. In honour and recognition of Kinnear’s long standing support of health care in Calgary, the recently opened emergency centre at the Rockyview General Hospital was named after him.

In 2000, Kinnear’s private company, Pengrowth Management Limited, sponsored the National Hockey League (NHL) arena in Calgary known as the Saddledome and it was thus renamed the Pengrowth Saddledome. This move helped to keep the Calgary Flames, the local NHL hockey team from leaving the city at a particularly difficult time for the franchise. The naming rights agreement with the Calgary Flames and the Saddledome expired in 2010.

Through Pengrowth Management Limited, Kinnear established the Pengrowth-Nova Scotia Energy Scholarship in 2005 in partnership with the government of the province of Nova Scotia. The aim of this $2.5 million scholarship program is to enhance petroleum industry skills for the students in Nova Scotia’s post secondary institutions. During the same year, Kinnear became a founding partner of the Duke of Edinburgh’s Award for Business. He subsequently became the National Benefactor for Canada as a result of making the largest single donation to the Duke of Edinburgh's Award in Canada.

In 2007 Kinnear lead an effort to assist the Royal Canadian Golf Association (RCGA) in the search for a title sponsor for the Canadian Open. He gathered several executives and business leaders for roundtable discussions at both the 2007 Canadian Open at Angus Glen Golf Club in Markham, Ontarioas well as the Presidents Cup in Montreal. His passion and dedicated efforts in 2007 proved to be a major catalyst in RBC ultimately signing on as title sponsor of RBC Canadian Open. As a result, he was awarded the RCGA Distinguished Service Award in 2008.

Kinnear has donated C$5 million and engaged his friends and business associates to commit a further C$5 million to the Banff Centre's Kinnear Centre for Creativity and Innovation, a major new building opened in 2010 at the heart of the Banff Centre.

Kinnear was a member of the board of directors of the National Art Centre Foundation from 2009 to 2012. He was co-chair of the Governor General's Annual Award for the Performing Arts in 2010 and 2011.

Substantial fundraising for renovation activities at St. George's Chapel in Windsor, England, were made possible by the Bray Fellowship of which Kinnear is a member.

== Selected honours ==
- Ernst & Young Prairies, Entrepreneur of the Year (2001)
- Alberta Centennial Medal (2005)
- Consumers’ Choice, Businessman of the Year (2006)
- The Fraser Milner Casgrain Pinnacle Award (2007)
- Business Person of the Year - Alberta Venture Magazine (2007)
- RCGA Distinguished Service Award (2008)
- Fifty Most Influential People in Alberta – Alberta Venture Magazine (2008)
- Honorary Doctor of Commerce, Saint Mary's University (Halifax) (2009)

== Boards and committees ==
- Pengrowth Energy Trust, Chairman and CEO(1988–2009)
- Kinnear Rockyview Invitational Golf Tournament, Past Chairman
- Rockyview General Hospital Development Council
- Canadian Association of Petroleum Producers, Past Governor
- National Arts Centre Foundation, Former Director
- Banff Centre Board of Governors, Former Member
- Rockyview General Hospital Development Council
- Canadian Olympic Foundation Board, former Member
- Calgary Petroleum Club, former Director
- Oilmen's Golf Tournament, former Governor
- Canadian Council of Chief Executives, Member
- Calgary Chamber of Commerce, Past Member of the Board of Directors
