= Pengrowth Energy =

Canadian oil and natural gas company

Pengrowth Energy Corporation
- Type: Public
- Traded as: TSX:PGF; NYSE:PGHEF; OTCX:PGHEF
- Industry: Oil and natural gas
- Founded: December 1988; 37 years ago
- Founder: James S. Kinnear
- Defunct: January 7, 2020
- Fate: Acquired by Cona Resources
- Headquarters: Calgary, Alberta, Canada
- Key people: James S. Kinnear (CEO (1988-2009)); Derek Evans (CEO (2009-18)); Peter Sametz (CEO (2018-20))
- Products: Royalty trust, oil and natural gas commodities
- Website: www.pengrowth.com

Pengrowth Energy Corporation was a Canadian oil and natural gas company based in Calgary, Alberta. Established in 1988 by Calgary entrepreneur James S Kinnear, it was one of the largest of the Canadian royalty trusts ("Canroys"), with a market capitalization of US$4.12 billion at the end of 2007. Its assets were approximately evenly distributed between oil and natural gas.

Pengrowth's assets are in the Western Canada sedimentary basin, a geologic region which has a long history of productivity in crude oil and natural gas. In addition to the properties in western Canada, the company had assets in the Atlantic Ocean off of Nova Scotia. Pengrowth produced petroleum ranging from heavy crude oil to light oil, natural gas liquids, and natural gas. Proved reserves in 2006 were reported to be 200 million barrels (32,000,000 m^{3}) of oil equivalent (boe) with an additional 160 million barrels (25,000,000 m^{3}) of probable reserves. Average daily production in 2006 was 62,821 barrels per day (9,987.7 m^{3}/d) (bpd) with a projected amount of 86,000 to 87,000 for 2007; figures verifying these totals should be released in early 2008 (those estimates for 2007 ended up being fairly accurate, that year Pengrowth produced 87,401 boe per day, the highest for any annual period between 2005 and 2009, also in 2007 natural gas made up the highest percentage for any of those years (51%)). In 2009 total production averaged 79,519 boe/d (29.0 million barrels for the year) of which 49,126 (61.78%) was natural gas related, 22,841 (28.72%) was crude oil and the rest 7,551 (9.50%) heavy oil.

Pengrowth Energy Trust paid a high dividend, yielding an annual rate of 15.9% in early 2008; in addition, it paid out monthly, a relative rarity for equities listed on the New York Stock Exchange. Since Pengrowth's assets were considered a depletable resource, its dividend payments were not taxed at the regular dividend rate, but rather as return of capital instead of return on investment; this is an additional tax advantage in the United States, and applies to all royalty trusts. However, in December 2015 the company suspended all dividends as it struggled to fund upcoming bond payoffs. In June 2018, the company was delisted from the New York Stock Exchange and changed its ticker symbol from PGH to PGHEF.

Scotiabank Saddledome, home to the Calgary Flames of the NHL, was known as Pengrowth Saddledome from 2000 until 2010 when Scotiabank took over their naming rights.

== Business model ==
The Pengrowth Energy Corporation owned Pengrowth Management Limited and the Pengrowth Gas Income Fund (later renamed Pengrowth Energy Income Fund). The income fund was a royalty trust that owned, wholly or partly, producing oil and gas wells. The income that the well derived from selling its commodity was distributed to shareholders as monthly dividends, after covering costs associated with infrastructure maintenance, debt payments and management fees. The management company was responsible for negotiating a price it would pay for the well, based on factors such as the expected maintenance costs, commodity prices and proven reserves, as well as how much money could be raised by issuing shares and through debt financing. Pengrowth was an early adopter of this new investment strategy which had emerged as a result of a tax ruling that this was a flow-through entity not subject to corporate tax. Further, as it only invested in depreciating assets it was eligible for tax deferrals benefits. The favourable tax treatment and avoiding initial exploration costs resulted in high dividend yields relative to other oil and gas companies and other income trusts, especially in times of rising oil and natural gas prices. However, the fund incurred risks in times of commodity prices lower than what was paid for the well, or lower than what is needed to cover costs like debt repayments. Pengrowth was unique from similar royalty trusts, such as Enerplus, in that it delivered monthly, rather than quarterly, dividends and it kept its management as a separate company.

== History ==
In 1982 Chartered Financial Analyst James S. Kinnear founded Pengrowth Management Limited to manage an investment portfolio of several pension funds. Finding success based on investments in the oil and gas industry, he founded the Pengrowth Gas Corporation under which Pengrowth Management Limited would manage the new Pengrowth Gas Income Fund. The fund was launched in December 1988 with a $12.5 million initial public offering. Over the next several years, Pengrowth would acquire interest in various oil and gas wells throughout Alberta and Saskatchewan. For example, in 1993, the company raised $8.4-million through selling 1.5 million new shares ($5.50 per share) to purchase $14 million of new properties, with the balance acquired through debt financing. In 1994 they purchased Acquifund Resources Ltd. and Dunbar Oil Ltd. for $39 million. The fund rapidly grew into 1995 when, with a market capitalization of $213 million it was listed on the TSE 300 index, though it was delisted from the index in 1997 due to a lack of clarity on how to properly value such a fund relative to traditional stocks. In 1996, with its interest equally split between oil and gas commodities, the fund changed its name to Pengrowth Energy Fund.

In 1997, Pengrowth made what would become one of its most significant purchases. With a market capitalization of $440-million, the company agreed to purchase Imperial Oil Ltd.'s Judy Creek and Swan Hills properties for $595 million with an additional $106-million purchase in 1999. By that time, the Canadian Bond Rating Service had devised a means to rank royalty trusts and ranked Pengrowth as "moderate", upgraded to "positive" the next year based on sustainability and volatility (i.e. commodity prices, interest rates, equity ownership vs. debt financing, etc.). By 2000 the company was valued over $1 billion and had properties producing 30,000 barrels per day of oil equivalent. In that year, on behalf Pengrowth Management Limited, Kinnear purchased the naming rights for the Calgary Saddledome for the next 10 years; it would be named the 'Pengrowth Saddledome' between 2000 and 2010.

In 2001 the company, along with Emera, acquired an 8.4% stake in the Sable Offshore Energy Project as the Nova Scotia government sought to divest itself from its oil and gas operations. Despite several corrections being made to the amount of Sable's proven gas reserves over the next few years, Pengrowth continued to invest there, buying out Emera and acquiring an undersea pipeline and processing infrastructure. At this time, the company was the largest oil and gas royalty trust in Canada, with a market capitalization over $1.2 billion and an interest in more than 60 oil and gas properties, until the Canadian Oil Sands Trust, with absorption of Athabasca Oil Sands Trust, overtook Pengrowth. In April 2002, seeking better access to American investors, the company listed shares at US$10.11 on the New York Stock Exchange seeking a $250 million cap-at the time its TSE shares were selling at CDN$16.01; it was the second Canadian energy royalty trust, just behind Enerplus, to seek investors on the NYSE. Later that year, with Calpine seeking to exit the Canadian market, Pengrowth acquired Calpine's British Columbia holdings, predominately crude oil. The acquisition grew Pengrowth to $2 billion, though still second behind Enerplus and with $600 million of debt and its shares trading at $14.73. With the 2004 acquisition of much of Murphy Oil's Canadian properties Pengrowth expanded to $3.3 billion.

Pengrowth peaked in mid-2006, with a $27 share price and 25 cent monthly dividends. It reached a nearly a $5 billion market cap in 2006 following its merger with natural gas heavy Esprit Energy Trust and the announcement that it would acquire $1 billion worth of properties from ConocoPhillips's newly acquired Burlington Resources Canada. However, the company suffered its first major setback, as it began a long decline, with the federal government's October 31 announcement that it would begin, effective 2011, taxing royalty trust distributions causing its share price to fall to $19 in November. Natural gas prices had already peaked in 2005 and despite a spike oil and gas commodity prices in mid-2008 when its share price was still at $20, with 22 cent dividends, it was down to a low of $6 and 10 cent dividends in March 2009 following the 2008 financial crisis. Founder and chief executive officer Kinnear would retire in September 2009 and be replaced by Derek Evans who had been Pengrowth's president and chief operating officer since March 2008. The stock price would peak again only at $14, in Spring 2011, just before their Judy Creek facility suffered a spill of approximately 1.9-million litres of produced water and oil caused by stress corrosion cracking. Nevertheless, in 2012, Pengrowth completed what would be its last major acquisition in a $1.9 billion deal, and expanded its market cap to $6.6 billion, to purchase NAL Energy Corporation.

With its dividends cut from 7 to 4 cents, Pengrowth's share price would fall again in 2012 and stay between $4 and $7 through 2014. The company had been transitioning its main focus from acquiring and extending the life of aging assets to developing its own long-term oil-producing facility. Having become overly burdened with debt, it began selling assets to develop a steam-assisted gravity drainage project near Lindbergh, Alberta, in the Cold Lake oil sands. While posting losses, they sold over $1 billion of assets throughout 2013 to fund the Lindbergh project, expected to come online in early-2015 at a cost $590 million, (revised in mid-2014 to $630 million) and to pay down some of its $2 billion of debt. However, as oil and gas commodity prices plummeted in 2015, Pengrowth struggled to meet its debt repayment schedules. While the Lindbergh project was producing, its expansion and all new spending was deferred. Throughout 2015 the company significantly reduced its staffing as more assets were sold or written off and reduced dividends to 2 cents before ending all dividend payments in November. In March 2016, with shares trading at $1.40, Toronto billionaire Seymour Schulich acquired a 14.7% stake in Pengrowth by purchasing 80 million out-standing shares. He continued buying in throughout 2016, reaching 19% by October and up to 30% in 2019. However, commodity prices did not rebound as expected and the company continued to sell properties until its only remaining major assets were the Lindbergh facility and the natural gas infrastructure in Groundbirch, British Columbia, though it had repaid $1.3 billion of its debt. Pengrowth's CEO Derek Evans retired in March 2018, replaced by Peter Sametz. The company was partially successful in its efforts to restructure or extend its debt but had to solicit offers to sell or merge the remainder of the business. In November 2019, with shares trading at 71 cents, the company announced its intention to be taken over by Cona Resources, an operations company established by oil and gas private equity firm Waterous Energy Fund, for 5 cents a share (totaling approximately $28 million) plus inheriting Pengrowth's remaining $712-million of debt. While the trading of the company's American stocks were transferred from the New York Stock Exchange to the OTCQX in June 2018, effective January 7, 2020, Pengrowth was delisted from both the Toronto Stock Exchange and OTCQX.
