= MDU Resources =

American energy company

MDU Resources Group, Inc.
- Type: Public
- Traded as: NYSE: MDU; S&P 600 component
- Industry: Electric Power; Natural Gas; Construction
- Founded: 1924; 102 years ago in Minneapolis, Minnesota, U.S.
- Founders: Rolland Heskett
- Headquarters: Bismarck, North Dakota, U.S.
- Area served: Most of United States
- Key people: Harry J. Pearce (Chairman); Nicole Kivisto (CEO)
- Revenue: ▲US$ 4.657 billion (2023)
- Operating income: ▲US$ 426.0 million (2023)
- Net income: ▲US$ 414.7 million (2023)
- Total assets: ▼US$ 7.833 billion (2023)
- Total equity: ▼US$ 2.905 billion (2023)
- Number of employees: 9,145 (2023)
- Subsidiaries: Knife River Corporation; MDU Construction Services Group, Inc; Cascade Natural Gas; WBI Holdings Inc.; Centennial Energy Resources LLC; Capital Electric Construction Co Inc; Granite City Ready Mix
- Website: mdu.com

MDU Resources Group, Inc. is a U.S.-based corporation supplying products and services to regulated energy delivery and utilities related construction materials and services businesses. It is headquartered in Bismarck, North Dakota, and operates in 48 states.

== Early history ==
MDU Resources got its start in 1924 as the Minnesota Northern Power Company. Its founder, Rolland Heskett, had previously been involved with utilities in Wisconsin and northeast Minnesota (the forerunners of Wisconsin Public Service Corporation and Minnesota Power (& Light Co.), respectively).

The firm's holdings initially consisted of the electric utility at Cushing, Oklahoma, Minnesota Electric Light & Power Company, which served the Bemidji, Minnesota area, the Eastern Montana Light & Power Company, centered around Sidney and Glendive, Montana, and the Eastern Montana Utilities Co., which was based in Fairview, Montana. The Cushing property was soon spun off to Oklahoma Gas & Electric. The Minnesota Electric Light & Power system was likewise spun off to the W.B. Foshay interests in 1925 (but by the end of WWII, it had become the Bemidji division of Otter Tail Power Company).

The company's remaining properties in eastern Montana became the nucleus of the MDU's present-day electric territory. The company became aware of another utility in that area (the United Power Co. of Crosby, North Dakota) serving several towns towards and including Kenmare, North Dakota. United Power was acquired in 1926, and the three companies began operating under the Montana-Dakota Power Co. name.

Initially, Minnesota Northern was in the business of selling electric power only, but entered the natural gas business following its discovery of oil in 1936 in the Williston Basin in Eastern Montana. As it expanded across Eastern Montana and western North Dakota, it acquired the electric franchise for Miles City, Montana, after an acquisition struggle with the Montana Power Company.

Shortly after passage of the Public Utility Holding Company Act of 1935 (PUHCA), Heskett reorganized all the gas and electric subsidiaries of Minnesota Northern Power under one name: Montana-Dakota Utilities.

== Later history ==
Unlike its neighboring utilities, MDU was generally not in the business of reselling energy at wholesale to other companies, with the exception of five Eastern Montana towns then served by the Mountain States Power Company. The distribution systems in these towns passed into MDU ownership by the early 1940s.

The company's common stock began trading on the New York Stock Exchange under the ticker symbol MDU in 1948. By the 1960s it was decided that the company's headquarters should be located within its service territory, in Bismarck, the largest town on the system, and the relocation was completed in 1968.

In 1985, the corporation realigned its operations under the name MDU Resources Group, Inc. In 1992, it acquired its first aggregates-mining company in central California, and has continued to expand its construction materials business. Knife River Corporation is now among the largest sand and gravel producing companies in the U.S. In 2001, Knife River sold its remaining coal-mining interests.

In 1997, MDU Resources started its utility services division, which over the years has expanded its construction services offerings and become the MDU Construction Services Group segment.

In 2024, MDU Resources rebranded its construction services business, MDU Construction Services Group, Inc., to Everus Construction Group, Inc. in preparation for a planned tax-free spinoff of the business.

== Acquisition and lawsuit ==
The largest addition of electric utility territory came in 1945, when MDU purchased the Dakota Public Service Company (DPSC) from NorthWestern Public Service Company (NWPS) of Huron, South Dakota. DPSC served a total of 91 towns in west-central North Dakota originally served by the Hughes Electric Company/North Dakota Power & Light Company (NDP&L) and south-central North Dakota/north-central South Dakota originally served by the Northern Power & Light Company (NP&L). When MDU examined DPSC's books after the purchase, they spent the next six years in litigation with NWPS over allegations of improper internal charges between NWPS, NP&L, and NDP&L. Both companies eventually realized the lawsuit was unproductive and they ceased litigation.

After the end of the lawsuit, MDU refocused on the growing demand for electricity and gas within its newly expanded territory and the necessary system improvements. In the late 1960s, MDU partnered with NWPS and Otter Tail Power in the construction of the Big Stone power plant near Big Stone City, South Dakota. The companies have since partnered on two base-load power plants (Big Stone and Coyote).

=== 2016 Portland gas explosion - Loy Clark lawsuits ===
The Oregon Public Utility Commission faulted MDU subsidiary Loy Clark for the 2016 Portland gas explosion that leveled a building, sent asbestos fragments flying, damaged numerous buildings and injured eight people. The damages totaled $17.2 million. The PUC faulted Loy Clark and listed the cause of the accident as Loy Clark's failure to give sufficient notifications to regulators about excavation plans. Additionally, OSHA cited and fined Loy Clark for safety violations as a result of this incident. Ten lawsuits were filed against Loy Clark in November 2018, two of which were by insurers who had paid out claims. Two additional lawsuits were filed against Loy Clark in December 2019.

== Subsidiaries ==
Cascade Natural Gas Corporation, serving parts of Oregon and Washington, was acquired by MDU Resources in 2006. Intermountain Gas Company, serving parts of Idaho, was acquired by MDU Resources in 2008. In 2023 MDU spun off Knife River Corporation, which provides construction materials and contracting services, including aggregate, asphalt, building materials, cement, construction services, liquid asphalt, and ready-mix concrete in 17 states, into a separate publicly traded company.

== See also ==
- Bombard Renewable Energy
- Williston Basin Pipeline
