= Brunswick Pipeline =

Gas transmission

The Brunswick Pipeline is a natural gas transmission pipeline in the Canadian province of New Brunswick.

It runs from the Canaport liquified natural gas (LNG) receiving and regasification terminal at Red Head in east Saint John, NB to Woodland, Maine in the United States where it connects to the Maritimes & Northeast Pipeline (M&NP). It is owned by Emera.

The Brunswick Pipeline is 145 km (90 mi) in length and 30 in (760 mm) in diameter. Construction began in November 2007 and the pipeline entered service in July 2009.

Approval of the pipeline by the National Energy Board was controversial for several reasons. The project was challenged by M&NP on the grounds that it was unnecessary and that their system's Saint John Lateral had sufficient capacity to handle the export-oriented requirements of LNG imported to the Canaport terminal. M&NP contended that the Brunswick Pipeline was considered a "bullet" that bypassed their Canadian system to interconnect in Maine instead. The project was also challenged for environmental reasons due to its route in the city of Saint John which crossed through Rockwood Park.

== Owners ==
- Emera Inc. (100%)

== See also ==
- Maritimes & Northeast Pipeline
- Enbridge Gas New Brunswick distributes natural gas to residential and commercial customers in New Brunswick
