= SOEP =

SOEP may refer to:

- Sable Offshore Energy Project, a natural gas consortium
- Socio-Economic Panel, a dataset of the population in Germany
