= Enbridge Gas New Brunswick =

Enbridge Gas New Brunswick Inc.
- Type: Subsidiary
- Founded: 1999
- Successor: Sold to Liberty Utilities

Enbridge Gas New Brunswick Inc. was a subsidiary of Enbridge that provided natural gas distribution in the Canadian province of New Brunswick. It was renamed and is now operated by Liberty Utilities, a subsidiary of Algonquin Power & Utilities.

On December 4, 2018, Enbridge announced an agreement to sell Enbridge Gas New Brunswick to Liberty Utilities (Canada) LP, a wholly owned subsidiary of Algonquin Power and Utilities Corp., for a cash purchase price of CAD $331 million.

Based in Fredericton, the company receives gas from the Maritimes and Northeast Pipeline system and is regulated under the New Brunswick Energy and Utilities Board.

It currently operates systems in Westmorland County, York County, Sunbury County, Saint John County and Charlotte County.

== Communities served ==
- Dieppe
- Fredericton
- Moncton
- Oromocto
- Riverview
- Sackville
- Saint John
- St. George
- St. Stephen
- Dorchester
