= TransGas =

Canada-US pipeline system

TransGas Limited
- Company type: Subsidiary
- Industry: Natural gas transmission, storage and distribution
- Founded: 1988
- Headquarters: Regina, Saskatchewan, Canada
- Products: delivery of natural gas
- Parent: SaskEnergy
- Website: www.transgas.com

TransGas Limited operates the TransGas Pipeline, is a natural gas pipeline system which collects gas from wells sites in Saskatchewan and moves gas between Alberta, Saskatchewan, Manitoba, and the United States. The system consists of nearly 14,000 kilometres of high-pressure natural gas pipelines and 8 storage locations providing 40.5 PJ in total capacity.

TransGas Limited is a wholly owned subsidiary of SaskEnergy, a Saskatchewan Crown corporation. TransGas owns and operates the transmission utility for SaskEnergy, and has the exclusive legislated franchise to transport natural gas within the province of Saskatchewan. TransGas owns Many Islands Pipe Lines (Canada) Limited that interconnects the TransGas pipelines with TransCanada Pipelines in Alberta, Havre Pipelines in Montana and Williston Basin Pipeline in North Dakota.

In 2011 TransGas began undertaking an initiative to generate electricity from waste heat at its compressor facilities.
