= Bombard Renewable Energy =

American renewable energy provider

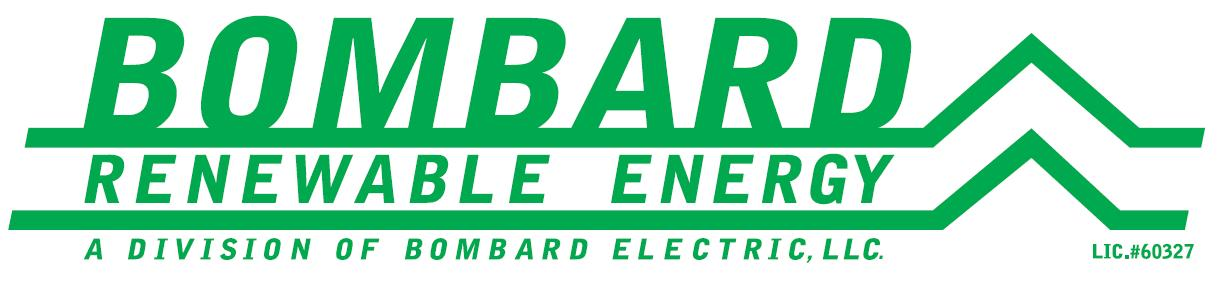
- Industry: Renewable Energy
- Founded: Renewable Energy Division of Bombard Electric, LLC began in 2006
- Headquarters: Las Vegas, Nevada, U.S.
- Area served: Nationwide (United States)
- Key people: Cliff Brooks Division Manager
- Number of employees: 250+
- Subsidiaries: Bombard Renewable Energy; Bombard Electric; Bombard Mechanical
- Website: Bombard Renewable Energy

Bombard Renewable Energy is an American provider of renewable energy services located in Nevada at Las Vegas. Bombard's primary services include the design, financing, construction, installation, operations, and maintenance of solar photovoltaic ("PV") energy systems. Additionally, Bombard performs energy efficiency audits, designs, and constructs mobile solar PV charging stations. Bombard specializes in building solar power systems that use solar photovoltaic (PV), wind energy and concentrated PV, also known as CSPV.

== History ==
Bombard Renewable Energy, located in Las Vegas, Nevada, is an indirect, wholly owned subsidiary of Everus Construction Group (EGC). Bombard Electric, LLC, founded in 1982 and acquired by MDU in 2005 and later split to Everus, later added the renewable energy division, Bombard Renewable Energy, in 2006. Bombard Renewable Energy has installed more than 70 Megawatts of Solar PV systems in Nevada and nationwide, both in the public and private sectors. In 2018, Bombard was ranked 13th on the Solar Power World's Top 100 Solar Contractors list as measured by kWh installed in 2027 with 235,848.3 kWh installed in 2020. In 2020, Bombard was 300th with 1,488 kWh installed capacity.

Bombard's staff includes four North American Board of Certified Energy Practitioners ("NABCEP") PV Installers, two of the first NABCEP certified Technical Sales staff in the United States, as well as the nation's second Underwriters Laboratories (UL), certified PV installer.

== Outreach ==
In 2009 Bombard donated and installed a 3-kilowatt Solar PV system at the Shade Tree Shelter in Las Vegas, consisting of 14 solar photovoltaic modules. The system was installed on the roof of Noah's animal house, The Shade Tree's animal shelter. The shelter will produce about 6000 or more kWh per year which will save them up to $500 per month from their monthly average energy bill of $5,000.

== Major Projects ==
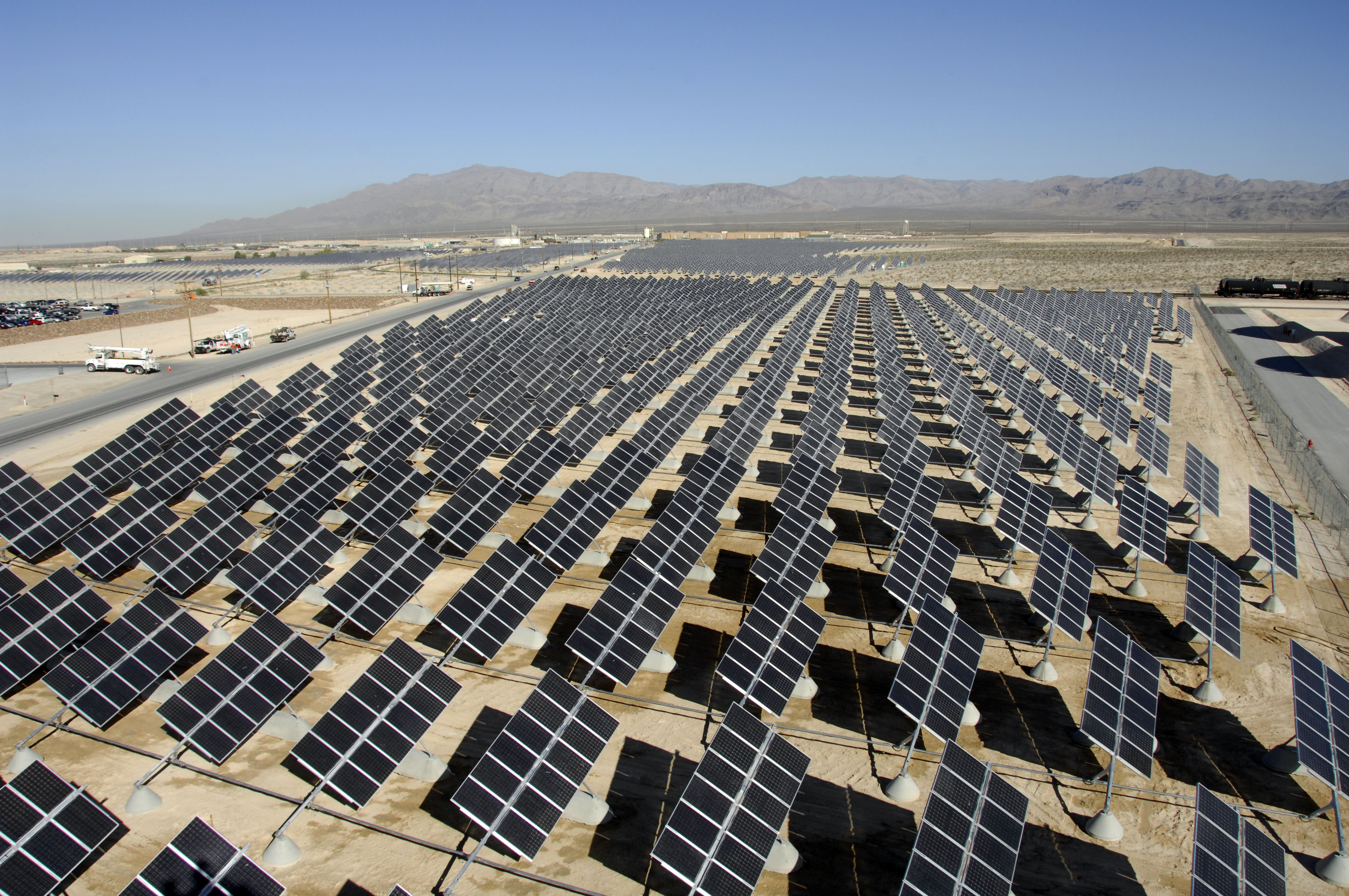
Nellis Solar Power Plant

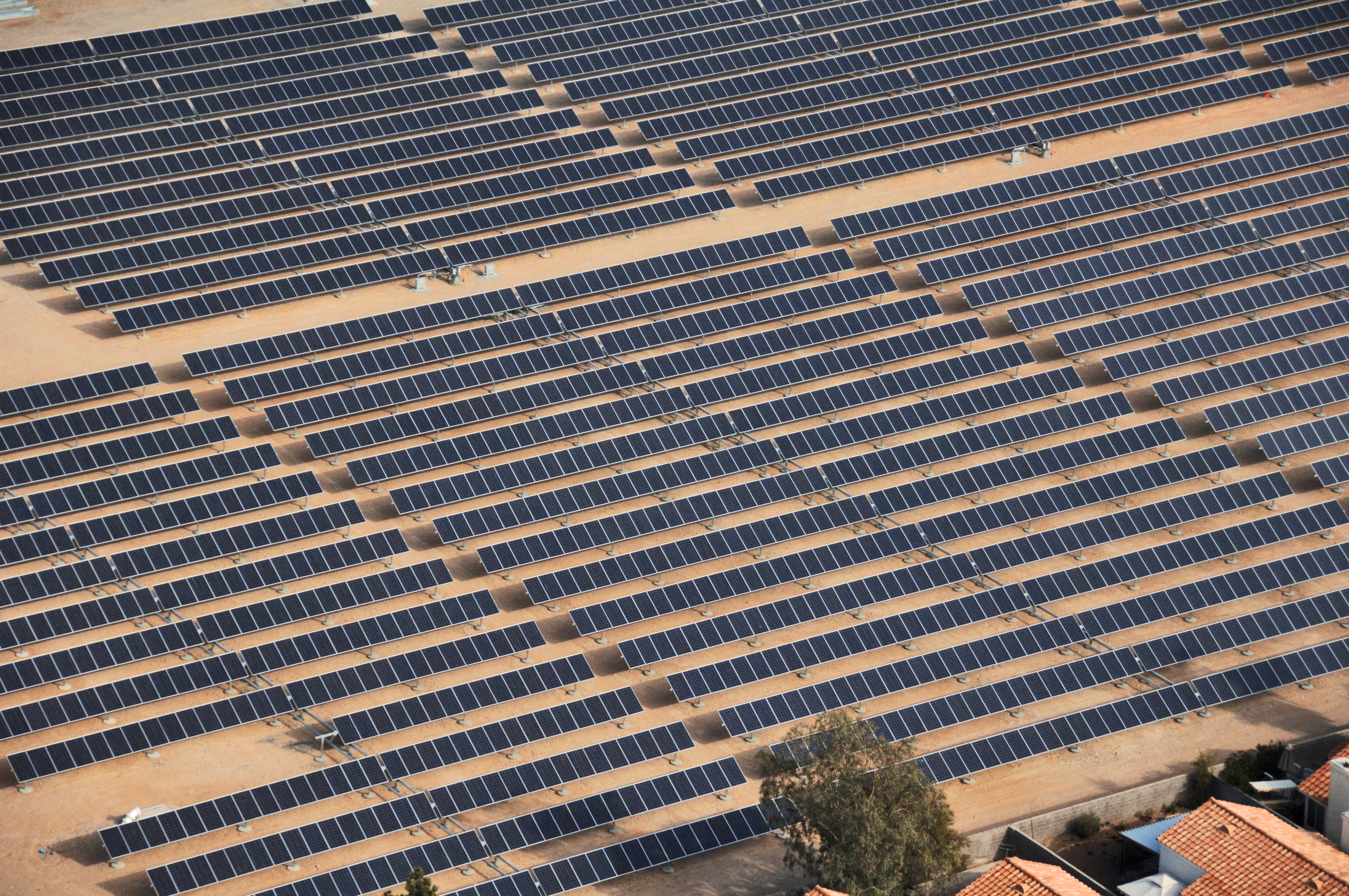
Las Vegas Water District's Ronzone Reservoir

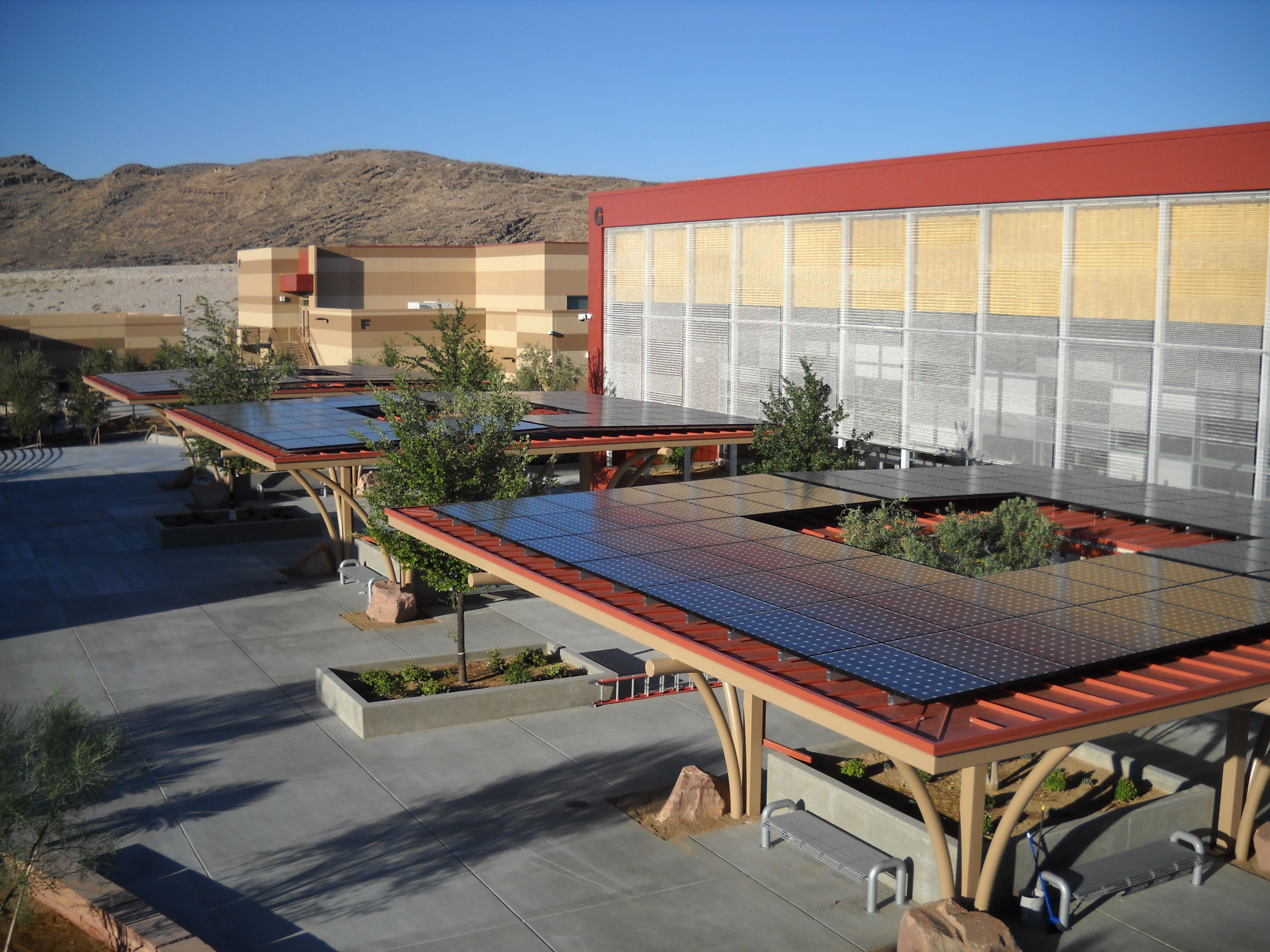
West Career and Technical Academy Las Vegas

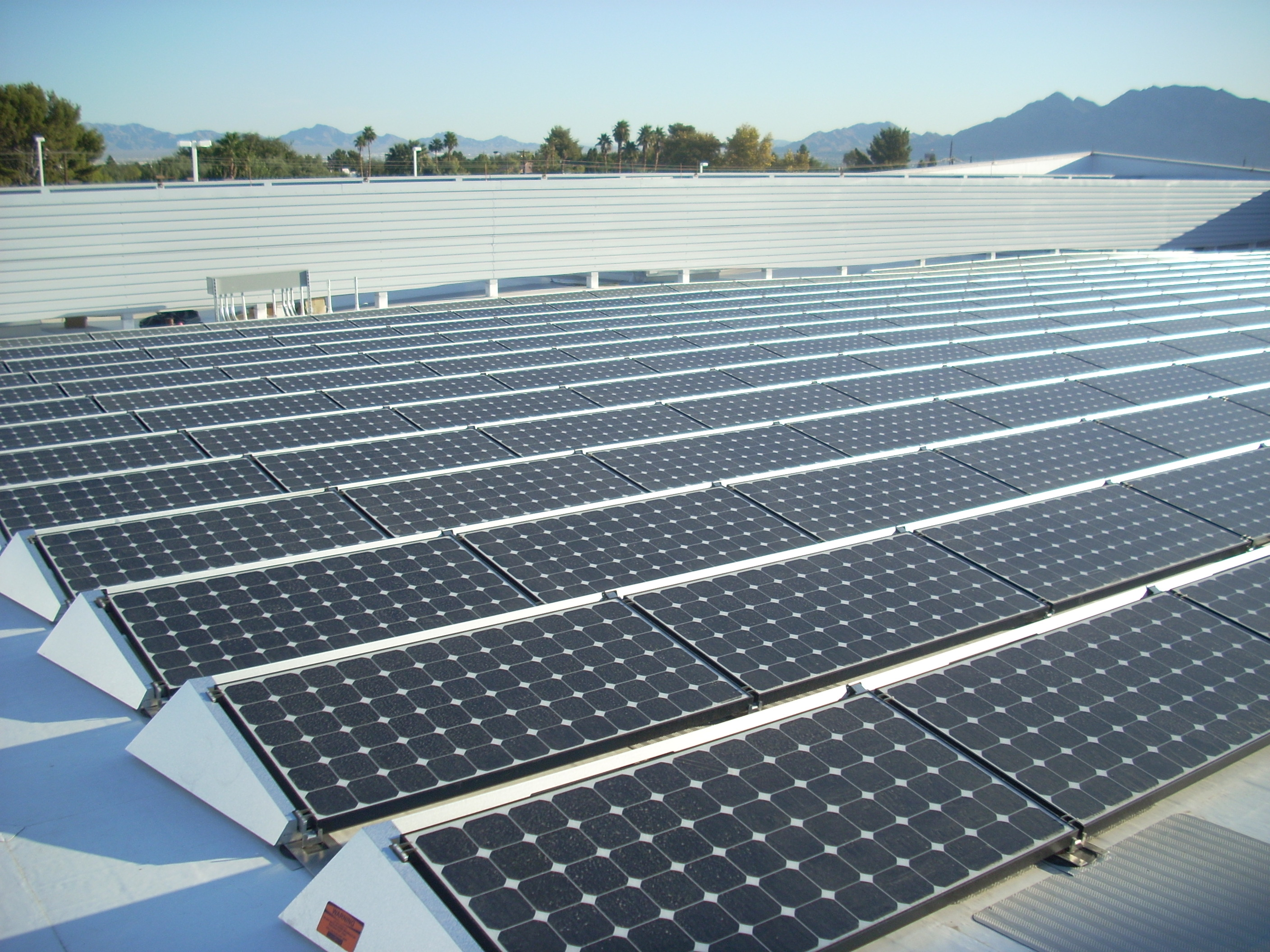
Roof of the Vegas PBS building

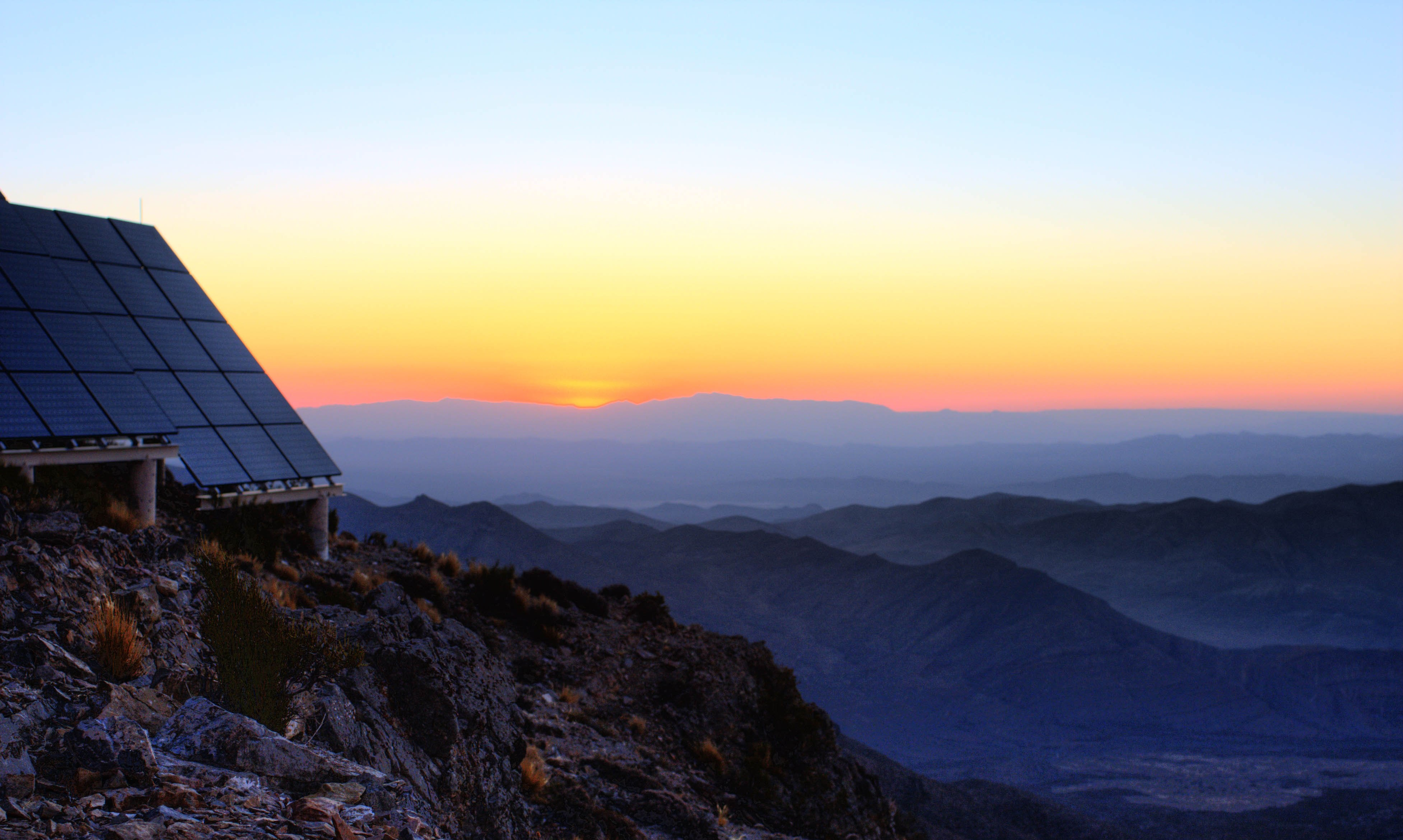
911 Emergency Expansion for LV Metro Police

In 2007, Bombard installed 11% of all grid-tied Solar Photovoltaic systems nationwide, to include an installation of 14 megawatts Nellis Solar Power Plant that generates about 25 million kilowatt-hrs of electricity annually and is located in the Nellis Air Force Base in Las Vegas. Bombard is also a partner with the local utility, NV Energy.

=== Nellis Air Force Base ===
14.2 Megawatt Ground Mount, Single Axis Tracking System.SunPower contracted Bombard to conduct R&D and to perform the installation of all solar PV and electrical equipment.

=== City of Las Vegas ===
3.5 Megawatt Ground Mount, Single Axis Tracking System for Water pollution Control Facility.

=== Las Vegas Valley Water District ===
3.1 Megawatts for various reservoirs (in conjunction with PowerLight Corporation).

=== Las Vegas Water District's Ronzone Reservoir ===
800 Kilowatt Ground Mounted Photovoltaic System (with PowerLight Corporation)

=== Clark County School District ===
690 Kilowatts of Photovoltaic Systems on eleven different schools.

=== Andre Agassi College Preparatory Academy ===
511 Kilowatts Photovoltaic System using ballasted roof mounted and covered parking mounting solutions.

=== Springs Preserve ===
400 Kilowatt Photovoltaic System(with PowerLight Corporation).

=== PBS Educational Technology Campus ===
In 2008, 182 kW PV system which consists of 792 SunPower SPR-230WHT solar modules. Generating approximately 73,600 kWh per yr.

=== UNLV, Greenspun College of Urban Affairs ===
135 Kilowatt Design-Build Photovoltaic System.

=== Ryan Operations Center (Nevada Power Co.) ===
115 Kilowatt Design-Build Photovoltaic System.

=== Las Vegas-Clark County Library District ===
103 Kilowatt Photovoltaic System using Ballasted roof mounted solution.

=== Sierra Plaza (Sierra Pacific Power Company Reno, NV) ===
90 Kilowatt Design-Build Photovoltaic/Wind Hybrid System.

=== Las Vegas Metro Police Department ===
Three locations totaling 90 kilowatts of Off-Grid Photovoltaic System using Fixed Ground Mounted solution.

=== Downtown Reno Wind Turbine ===
In 2009, the first wind turbine installed in downtown Reno.

=== Welcome to Fabulous Las Vegas sign ===
In 2014, solar energy for the Welcome to Fabulous Las Vegas sign.

== See also ==
- Renewable energy
