= Scotiabank Saddledome =

Multi-purpose indoor arena in Calgary, Alberta, Canada

- The Dome

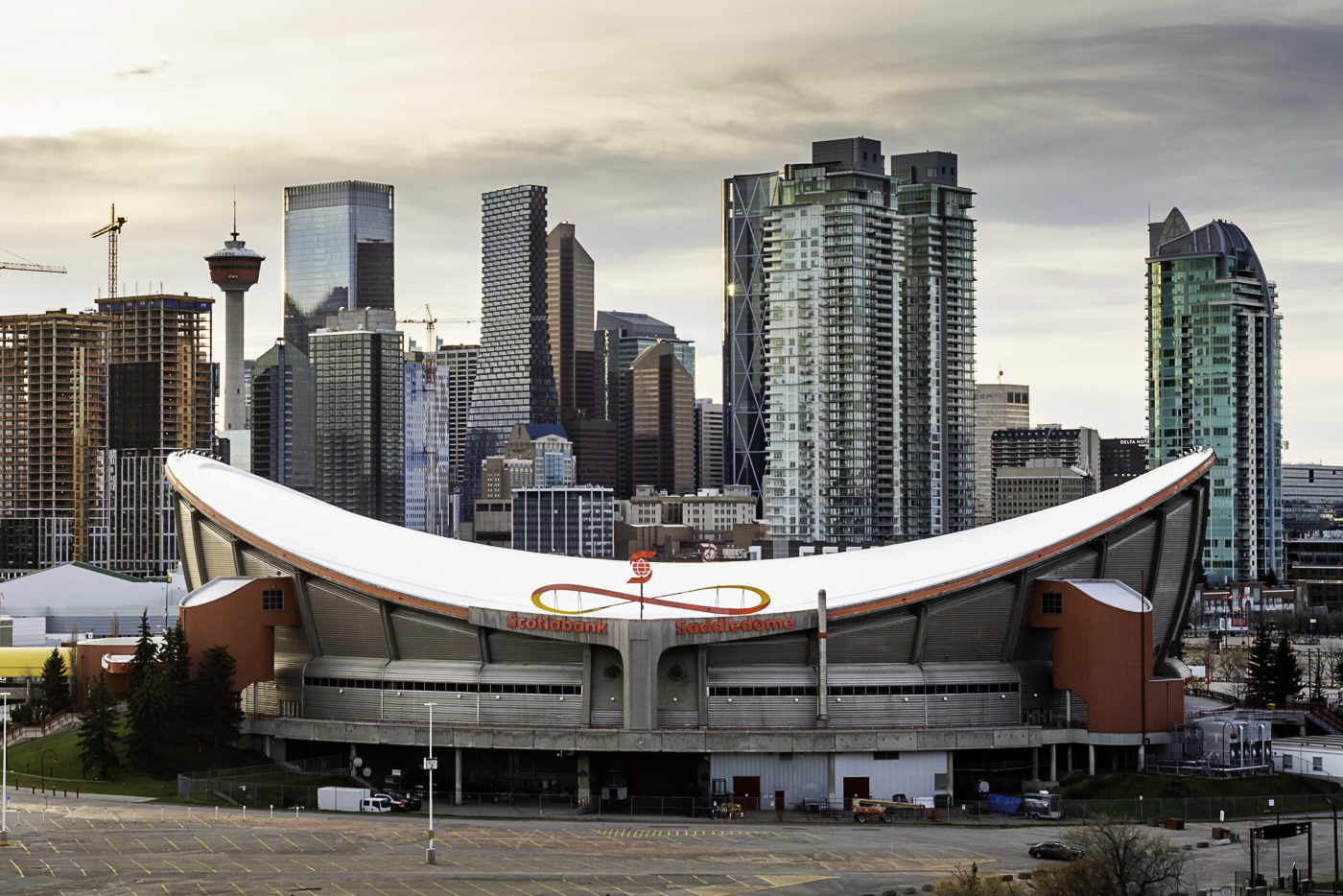
- Scotiabank Saddledome in 2020
- Interactive map of Scotiabank Saddledome
- Former names: Olympic Saddledome (1983–95); Canadian Airlines Saddledome (1995–2000); Pengrowth Saddledome (2000–10)
- Address: 555 Saddledome Rise SE
- Location: Calgary, Alberta, Canada
- Coordinates: 51°02′15″N 114°03′07″W
- Elevation: 1,045 m (3,430 ft) AMSL
- Owner: City of Calgary
- Operator: Saddledome Foundation; Calgary Sports and Entertainment
- Capacity: 16,605 (1983–1988); 20,240 (1988–1995); 19,289 (1995–present)
- Field size: 474,000 sq ft (44,000 m^{2})
- Public transit: Victoria Park/Stampede

Construction
- Groundbreaking: July 29, 1981
- Opened: October 15, 1983; 43 years ago
- Renovated: 1994
- Cost: C$97.7 million ($324 million in 2025 dollars) Renovation: 1994: C$37 million ($70.9 million in 2025 dollars)
- Architect: Graham McCourt Architects
- Structural engineers: Jan Bobrowski and Partners Ltd.
- Services engineer: Vinto Engineering Ltd.
- General contractor: CANA Construction Co. Ltd.
- Main contractor: SE Johnson

Tenants
- Calgary Flames (NHL) (1983–present); Calgary 88s (WBL) (1988–1992); Calgary Rad'z (RHI) (1993); Calgary Hitmen (WHL) (1995–present); Calgary Roughnecks (NLL) (2001–present); Calgary Wranglers (AHL) (2022–present)

Website
- scotiabanksaddledome.com

Scotiabank Saddledome is a multi-purpose indoor arena in Calgary, Alberta, Canada. Located in Stampede Park in the southeast end of downtown Calgary, the Saddledome was built in 1983 to replace the Stampede Corral as the home of the Calgary Flames of the National Hockey League (NHL), and to host ice hockey and figure skating at the 1988 Winter Olympics.

The facility also hosts concerts, conferences and other sporting championships, and events for the Calgary Exhibition and Stampede. It underwent a major renovation in 1994–95 and sold its naming rights, during which its original name of Olympic Saddledome was changed to Canadian Airlines Saddledome. The facility was given the name Pengrowth Saddledome in 2000, after Pengrowth Management Ltd. signed a ten-year agreement. It adopted its current name in October 2010 as Scotiabank signed on as title sponsor.

The Saddledome is owned by the City of Calgary, who leases it to the Saddledome Foundation, a non-profit organization, to oversee its operation. Since 1996, it has been managed by the Flames. The Saddledome was damaged during the 2013 Alberta floods in June and July that year, but was repaired and reopened in time for the 2013–14 NHL season.

The arena's roof is shaped like a horse saddle, thus earning the name "Saddledome". It is the third oldest arena in the NHL, after Climate Pledge Arena in Seattle and Madison Square Garden in New York City, although the latter two have been extensively renovated. The Saddledome is slated to be replaced by Scotia Place for the 2027–28 NHL season.

== Construction ==
Calgary had been served for 30 years by the Stampede Corral when the Calgary Flames arrived from Atlanta in 1980. With a total capacity of 8,700, the Corral was the largest arena in Canada west of Toronto in 1950, but had fallen below major league standards by the 1970s. The Corral was deemed insufficient for the National Hockey League (NHL) in 1977, leading the World Hockey Association's Calgary Cowboys to fold rather than hope to be a team selected to merge with the NHL.

Calgary's bid to host the 1988 Winter Olympics, coupled with the arrival of the Flames, drove the need to build a new arena. City Council debated the merits of several locations for the city's new Olympic Coliseum, and narrowed their choices down to two areas in the Victoria Park neighbourhood on the east end of downtown. Two other sites, one on the west end of downtown, and a late bid by several businessmen pushing to build the arena in the northern suburb of Airdrie were also considered.

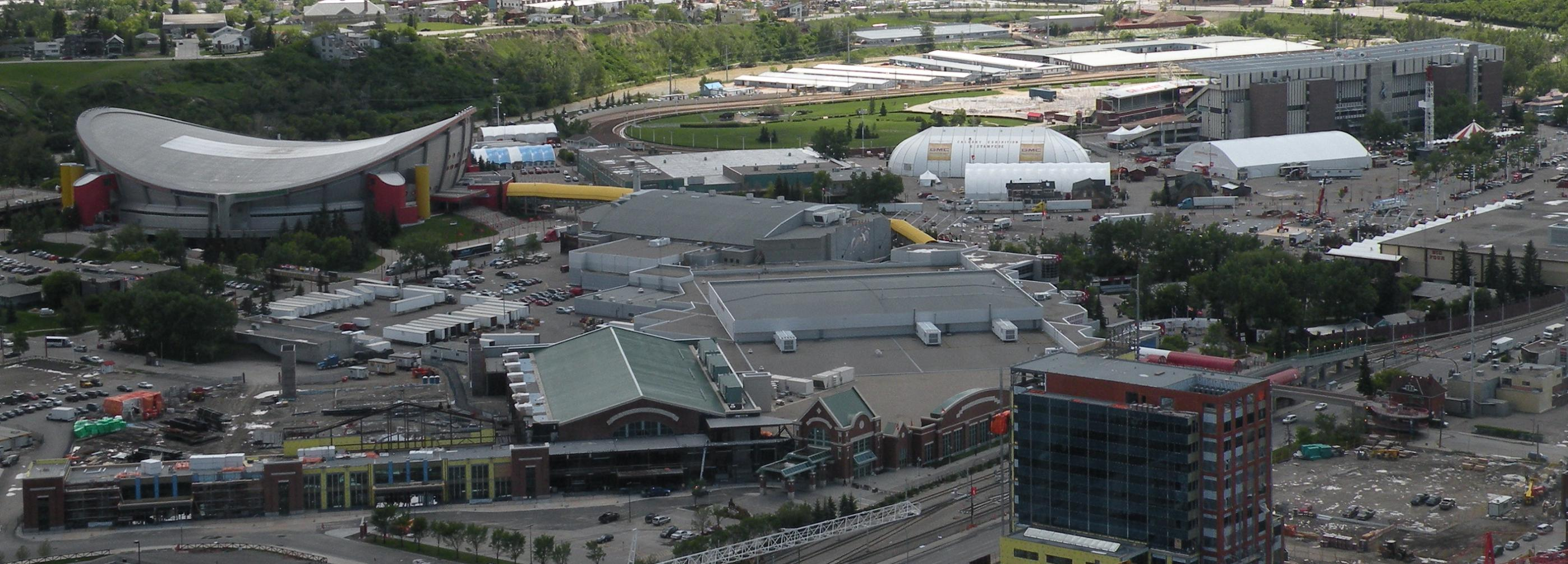
The Saddledome's location within Stampede Park, as seen from the Calgary Tower

The Victoria Park Community Association fought the bid to build the arena in their neighborhood, threatening to oppose the city's Olympic bid if necessary. City Council voted on March 3, 1981, to build the proposed 20,000-seat arena on the Stampede grounds, immediately east of the Corral and south of Victoria Park. The community continued to fight the city over rezoning the land to allow for the new arena amidst fears of traffic congestion in their neighbourhood which resulted in numerous costly delays to the start of construction. In a bid to end the battle, Mayor Ralph Klein asked the provincial government in July 1981 to take over the land designated for the arena to bypass the appeals process and force approval. The province supported the city amidst protests by community associations and invoked rarely used powers to overrule planning regulations, allowing construction to begin. The following day, on July 29, 1981, builders began construction of the arena. The International Olympic Committee was impressed that the project was underway, as noted in the XV Olympic Winter Games official report which stated "The fact that this facility was already being built added credibility to (Calgary's) bid and proved to be a positive factor in demonstrating Calgary's commitment to hosting the Games".

The facility was designed by Graham McCourt Architects. While they set out to design a unique building, the idea of a western theme never occurred to Barry Graham or his team. The roof of the building was designed to be a reverse hyperbolic paraboloid, similar to the 1971-built Scandinavium in Gothenburg, allowing for a pillar-free view from all seats and reducing the interior volume by a third relative to traditional arenas, resulting in reduced heating, lighting and maintenance costs. Additionally, the floating roof can flex to compensate for the city's frequent temperature fluctuations. When the design was unveiled, the roof was immediately referred to as being saddle-shaped. Of 1,270 entries submitted in a contest to name the arena, 735 involved the word Saddle. The winning name in the contest, Olympic Saddledome, was drawn from a hat filled with several similar saddle-themed names. At the time the name received a tepid reception from some, including the chairman of Calgary's Olympic Organizing Committee (OCO), Frank King, who was quoted as saying "It is neither Olympic nor western, and it's not even dome".

The designers won several architectural and engineering awards for their work on the Saddledome, and were honoured by the Royal Architectural Institute of Canada at its millennium celebration of architecture in 2000. As of 2008, the Saddledome was still reported as the world record holder for the longest spanning hyperbolic paraboloid concrete shell. The Saddledome was featured on the cover of Time magazine on September 27, 1987, for an article discussing the city of Calgary and the upcoming 1988 Olympics.

The location of the Saddledome within Stampede Park allows for easy access to Calgary's CTrain light rail transit system via the Victoria Park/Stampede station that stands parallel to Macleod Trail. Direct vehicle access is gained from the north via 5th Street East or Olympic Way.

== History ==
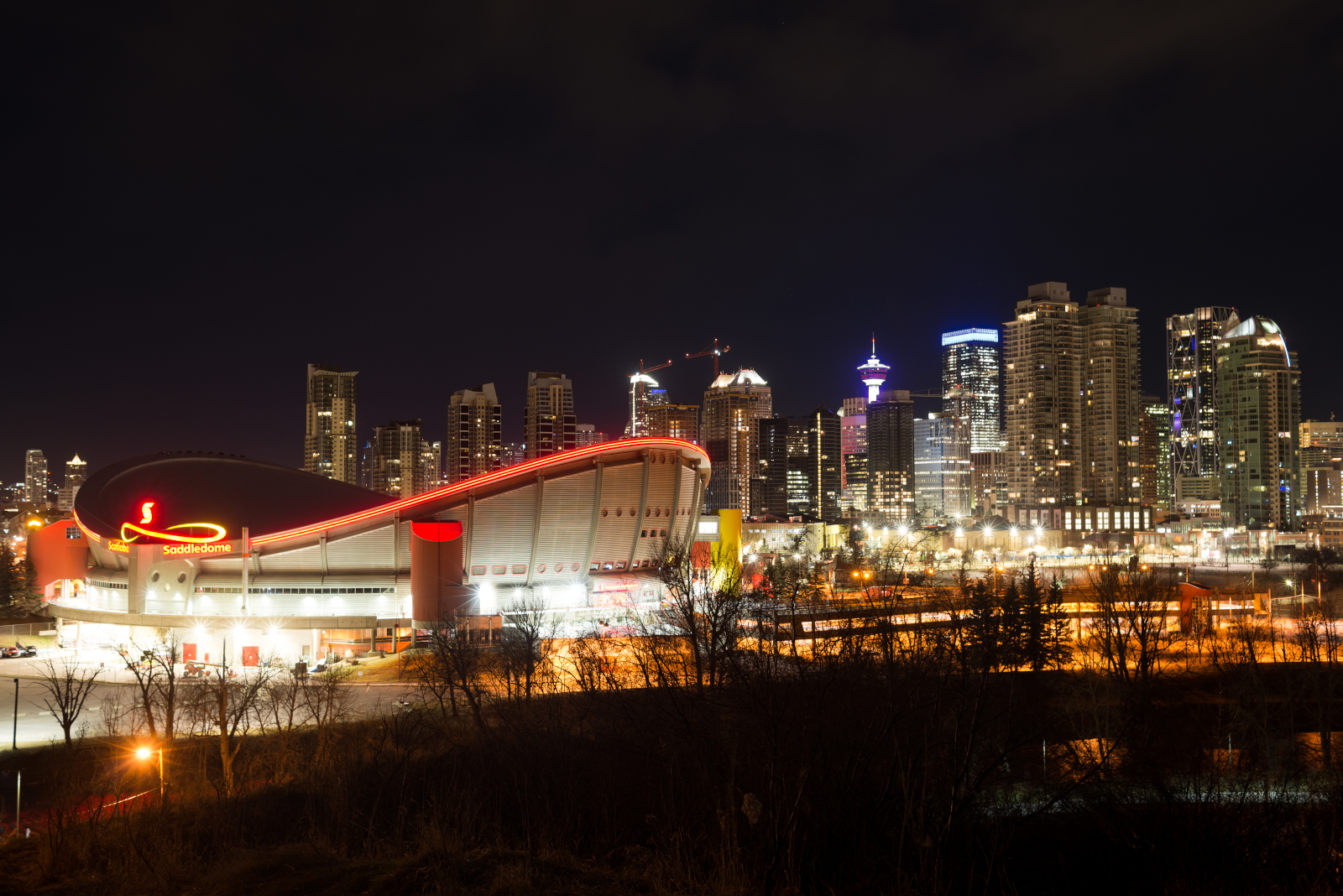
The Saddledome and Calgary skyline at night

The arena was initially projected to cost $60 million to build, and later revised to over $80 million. Attempts to fast track construction resulted in a $16 million cost overrun, resulting in a final cost of $97.7 million and an eight-month delay in its completion. Builders faced delays while building the roof as numerous adjustments were required to fit the giant concrete slabs between the array of cables that held them in place. Upset with the excess cost, opposition politicians in Alberta demanded a public hearing into the issue. A hearing conducted by the city placed much of the blame on the project manager, while the city and province were required to pay the additional costs.

When it opened on October 15, 1983, the Olympic Saddledome served to boost the morale of a city that was experiencing a significant downturn as a result of the international oil market collapse, high interest rates, and the federal government's National Energy Program. During the first event, an NHL game between the Flames and the Edmonton Oilers, the standard of Prime Minister Pierre Trudeau was the first thing booed by a population upset with the government's policies. The Oilers defeated the Flames 4–3 in front of a sold-out crowd of nearly 17,000 fans.

The initial seating capacity was 16,605 for hockey as the upper loges were not immediately completed. As the Olympics neared, the Calgary organizing committee spent $1 million to add over 2,600 seats to the upper loges in a bid to alleviate a scandal that resulted from the organizing committee giving its partners and sponsors preferential treatment in ticket sales. With a capacity of 20,016, the International Ice Hockey Federation noted that it was the largest arena ever used at the Winter Games, and called the facility "the finest international rink in the world" The International Olympic Committee praised the city's commitment to hosting the Olympics, noting in its official report that constructing the arena prior to being awarded the Games lent credibility to Calgary's bid and positively influenced voters. The Saddledome was the first arena in North America designed to accommodate the larger international ice surface (international rinks are 15 feet (4.6 m) wider than NHL rinks). The Saddledome reached its highest capacity in the early '90s at 20,240.

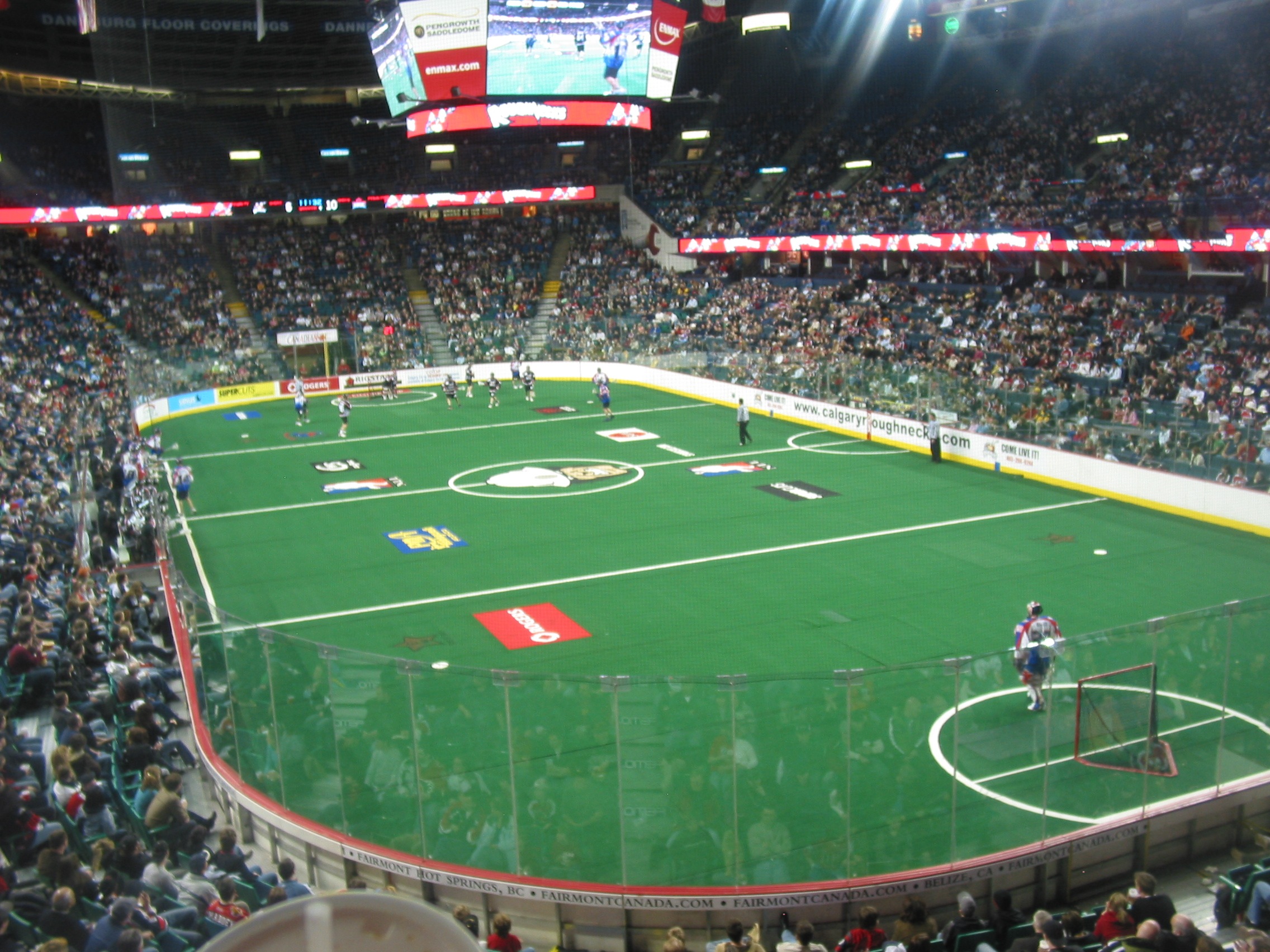
Inside the Saddledome during a Calgary Roughnecks game

The Flames petitioned the City of Calgary and the Saddledome Foundation to upgrade the facility in 1994, requesting renovations to add additional luxury boxes and a new club section. The Flames insisted the upgrades were necessary for the team to remain viable in the arena. They argued it was important that their landlord bring the arena up to the higher standards they felt was required. The team lobbied City Council in the hope it would agree to fund the majority of the $18 million renovation using federal infrastructure funds. At the same time, they rejected a counter proposal for applying a ticket surcharge to pay the cost. Media reports claimed the team was considering relocating out of Calgary if council did not agree. Flames' owners denied the reports, but said they had threatened to build a new rink elsewhere in the city. City Council supported the Flames' proposal in a 9–6 vote following several months of negotiations.

Renovations occurred between 1994 and 1995 and saw the addition of 41 new luxury suites at the top of the lower bowl, an 1,172 seat club section, a new restaurant, expanded offices for the Flames, Saddledome management and Hockey Canada, as well as a significant restructuring of the public concourse and a new parkade structure. The arena remained operational until the spring of 1995 despite ongoing construction, but was closed entirely between April and October 1995. The Saddledome officially reopened on October 25, 1995, for the Flames' first home game of the 1995–96 NHL season.

Prior to its reopening, the Flames signed a deal with Canadian Airlines to rename the facility. Under a 20-year agreement worth approximately $1 million per year, the arena became the Canadian Airlines Saddledome. Removing the "Olympic" moniker was controversial with both the public and City Council, though the city voted in favour of the deal which included the donation of a portion of the naming rights to fund amateur sports within the city. The arena was renamed again in 2000 when Canadian Airlines was acquired by Air Canada and ceased operations. Pengrowth Management Ltd. signed a 10-year agreement that gave the facility the name Pengrowth Saddledome.

The arena has received cosmetic upgrades in recent years. In 2004, the Flames spent $1 million on a LED "power ring" display that lines the facing of the second level. The JumboTron that was installed in 1995 was replaced in 2006 with a new HD video scoreboard. Along with the new board, the previous speakers were replaced with Apogee ALA-9 arrays in 2007. Manufactured by Daktronics and branded as the "Enmax Energy Board", the display contained 12 screens and two LED ribbons. A new scoreboard was installed in 2024, branded as the "Sportsnet Scoreboard"; which contains four, 30-foot (9.1 m)-tall displays with a total area of 2,160 square feet (201 m^{2}), and a 40-foot (12 m) "halo" ring.

=== 2013 flood ===
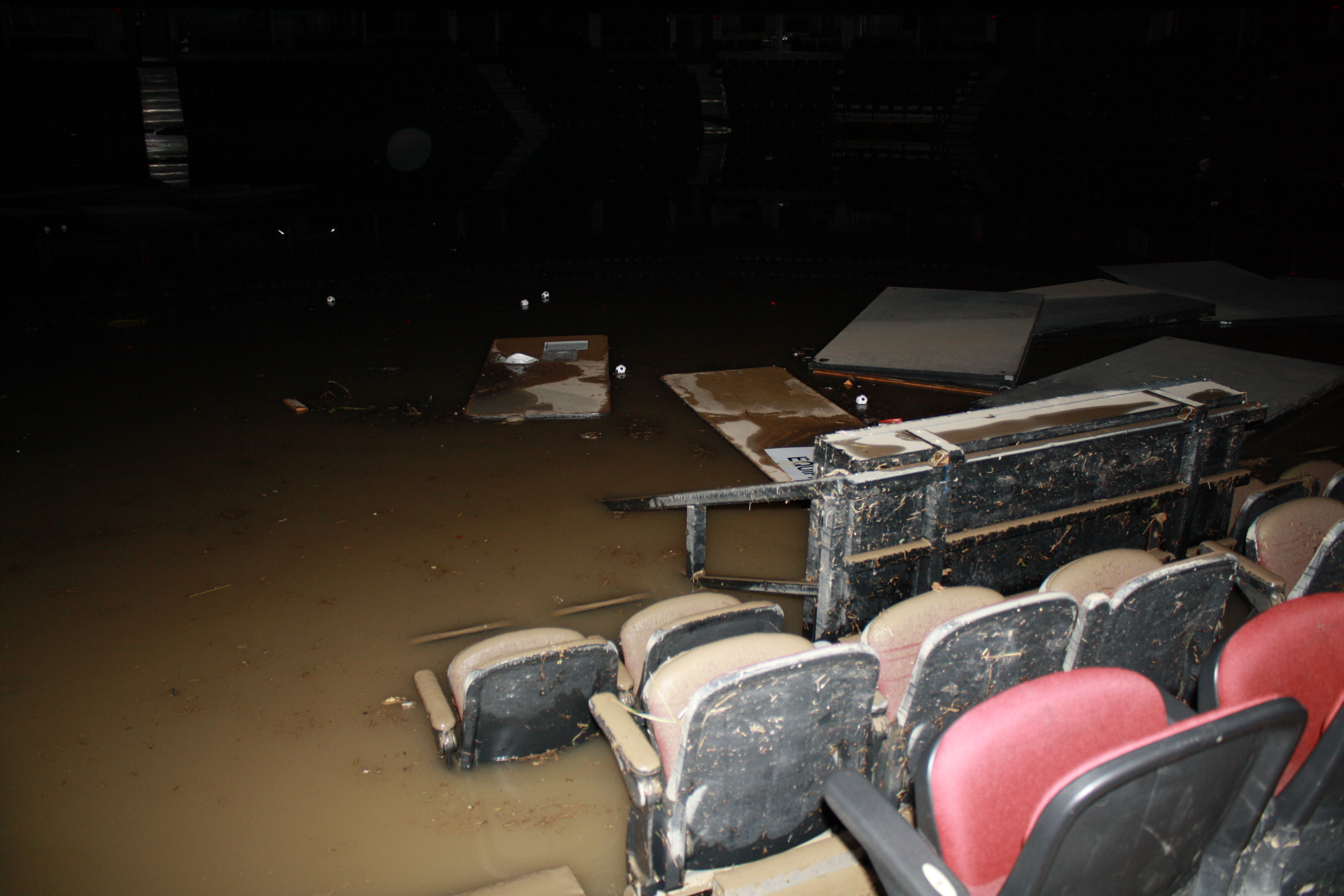
Flooding of the lower bowl reached the eighth row of seating.

The Saddledome was one of many buildings impacted by the 2013 Alberta floods. The flooding of the Elbow and Bow Rivers swamped many areas of the city, including Stampede Park where the Saddledome is located. The event level of the arena was filled with water, also wrecking the high definition scoreboard that had been sitting on the rink floor during the summer downtime, while the dressing rooms and control room for the video replay screen were swamped. At a press conference held on June 22, 2013, team president Ken King stated that the arena had flooded up to the eighth row and that the event level of the facility was a "total loss". He added that the team's equipment and some memorabilia had also been destroyed, but expressed confidence that the facility would be repaired and ready in time for the October start to the 2013–14 Calgary Flames season. Repairs to the facility forced the cancellation of all concerts and agricultural events scheduled for the 2013 Calgary Stampede.

Crews worked around the clock to repair the facility; Saddledome director of building operations Robert Blanchard estimated that 650,000 man hours of work was performed on the facility and noted that they had compressed a six-month project into two. The facility was granted its occupancy permit in late August, and the first event following the Saddledome's reopening was an Eagles concert on September 11. The first hockey game was September 14, a Flames pre-season contest.

== Events ==
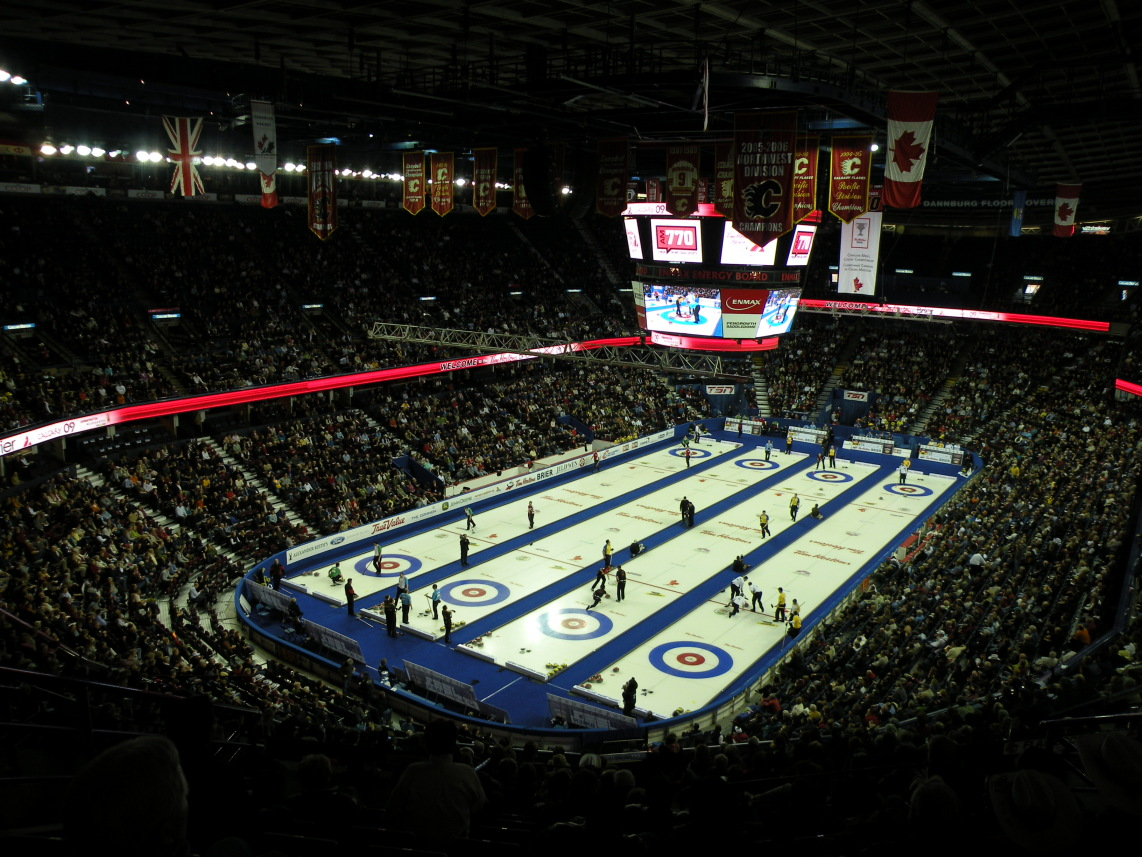
The Saddledome hosted the 2009 Tim Hortons Brier

As the home of the Flames, the Saddledome hosted the 1985 NHL All-Star Game, and the 2000 NHL entry draft. The Flames have played three Stanley Cup Finals series in the Saddledome: 1986, 1989 and 2004. The arena is also the home of the Calgary Hitmen of the Western Hockey League (WHL). The Hitmen won the President's Cup in 1999 before a WHL playoff record crowd of 17,139. Playing in the largest arena in the WHL, the Hitmen also hold league records for overall attendance (362,227 in 2004–05), as well as single game (19,305 in 2007–08). Once a year, the Saddledome also hosts the Crowchild Classic, a rivalry game between the men's and women's ice hockey teams of two Calgary universities, the Calgary Dinos and the Mount Royal Cougars. The 2026 men's game was the most attended in USports history, with 13,324 spectators. The Saddledome is also the home of the Calgary Roughnecks of the National Lacrosse League (NLL) and hosted the 2005 NLL All-Star Game. It has hosted the NLL Champion's Cup game four times: 2004, 2009, 2014 and 2019. The Roughnecks would raise the Cup on their home floor in all of these games except 2014. The stadium was one of the venues for the 2012 World Junior Ice Hockey Championships.

The opening of the Saddledome allowed Calgary to host major musical acts that were bypassing the city in the early 1980s, because the city's existing facilities were not large enough to accommodate the industry's top performers.

The Moody Blues were the first musical act to appear with Stevie Ray Vaughan opening, in November 1983, while Rod Stewart has made the most appearances in the Dome, 11. Many other top acts have made stops in the Saddledome; however, the inability of the roof to support the massive light, speaker and special effect rigs that some performers currently use has led the city to again be bypassed for some major tours.

In addition to hockey and figure skating at the 1988 Olympics, the Saddledome has been the site of numerous major national and international events. The facility has hosted Brier, the Canadian men's curling championship, on four occasions (1997, 2002, 2009 and 2015). It also hosted the women's championship, the Tournament of Hearts in 1995. The 2006 World Figure Skating Championships was also held in the arena. WWE held numerous shows at the Saddledome, including the pay-per-view event In Your House 16: Canadian Stampede in July 1997, as well as various episodes of Raw & SmackDown and live events/house shows. The Saddledome hosted its' final WWE event on August 23, 2026. AEW also held events such as Dynamite and Battle of the Belts VII. Among non-sporting events, the Saddledome most recently hosted a public address by the Dalai Lama in 2009 that was attended by 15,000 people. In 2005, Queen Elizabeth II attended a celebration of Alberta's centennial at the Saddledome.

The arena was also the site of the 1990 Liberal Party leadership convention.

It has also hosted PBR Bud Light Cup events; in 1998 and 1999 the event was known as "Cody Snyder's Bullbustin'", and in 2000 and 2001 the event was called the Professional Bull Riders Canadian Open. The Saddledome has also been a host for PBR Canada events.

On October 3, 2016, the Saddledome hosted a National Basketball Association preseason game between the Toronto Raptors and Denver Nuggets.

On July 21, 2012, the Saddledome hosted an Ultimate Fighting Championship event, which was UFC 149. Six years later, on July 28, 2018, the Saddledome hosted another UFC event, which was UFC on Fox: Alvarez vs. Poirier 2.

On April 1, 2026, the Professional Women's Hockey League (PWHL) played its first Calgary match with the Toronto Sceptres and Ottawa Charge, as part of the league's Takeover Tour. The Sceptres won 2–1 in front of 16,150 fans. The PWHL returned for its second and final game at the Saddledome on February 15, 2027 between the Ottawa Charge and Hamilton Havoc.

== Amenities ==
The Saddledome seats 19,289 for hockey and lacrosse, with different capacities for other events depending on the arena's configuration. It has 72 luxury suites, 41 of which were constructed at the top of the lower bowl in 1995 and 31 were constructed at the top of the second level when the facility was built. There are also six party suites on the corners of the upper loges that are rented on an event by event basis. Sections 115 through 122 of the lower bowl form The Club and offers in-seat concession service at Flames games. This was later expanded to the remainder of the lower bowl during Flames, Hitmen and Roughnecks games via the Saddledome Live app.

The Club features a private dining room available during Flames games, large concerts and private events. Dutton's Canadian Lounge is a sports bar located at the west entrance to the building. There are three additional restaurants within the facility: The Saddleroom Grill, the Alumni Lounge and the King Club. The Iconic Platinum Club is a 188-seat executive club accessible with a purchased membership. It features a private bar and restaurant as well as a fully functional business centre.

== Saddledome Foundation ==
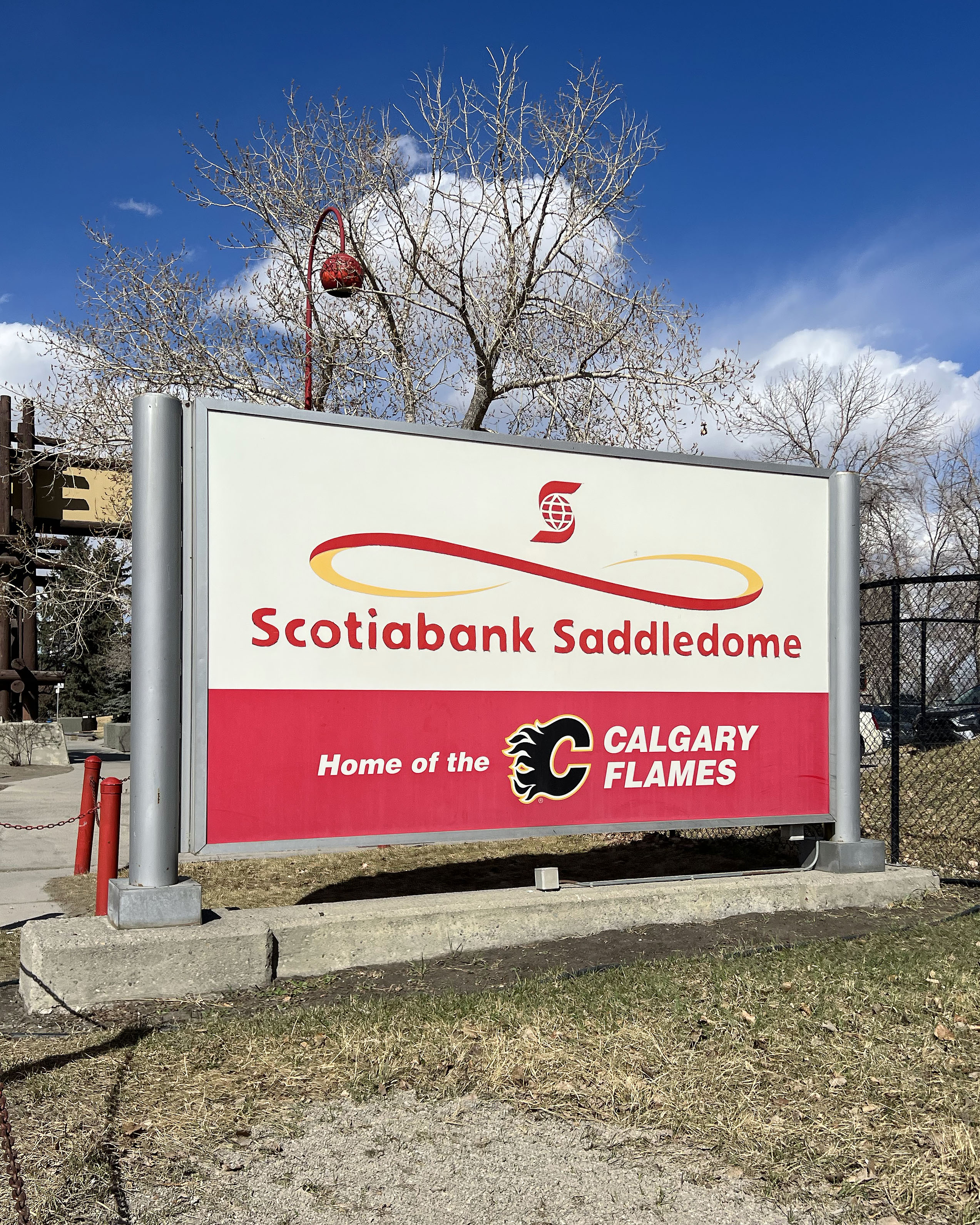
Saddledome entrance sign

The City of Calgary established the Saddledome Foundation in 1983 and leased the arena for 50-years to the non-profit organization. Its mandate was to "oversee the operation in a manner that protects taxpayers and benefits amateur sports at the local, provincial and national level". The foundation is made up of a board of nine directors: three appointed by the city, three appointed by the province, and one each appointed by the Calgary Olympic Development Association (now WinSport Canada), Hockey Canada and the Calgary Exhibition and Stampede. The foundation contracted the Stampede to manage the arena, and through its lease agreements with the Stampede and the Flames, earned 15% of gross concession sales, 50% of net income from luxury suites and executive seating and investment income on the arena's revenues. The Flames signed a 20-year lease in 1983 that earned them 70% of advertising revenues and 90% of ticket revenues. The Stampede earned 85% of concession revenues and all revenue from parking.

As part of the 1994 deal with the city, the Flames bought out the Stampede's contract for $20 million and took over management of the facility. While the city and Saddledome Foundation paid for the 1994–95 renovations, the new agreement required the Flames to pay for future arena maintenance and repairs, as well as any further renovations. The Flames agreed to manage the arena for 20 years and to contribute $14.5 million toward amateur sport in the city over that time. The Saddledome Foundation retains the responsibility of distributing funds to amateur sport. From its inception through 2007, it had allocated over $20 million toward this cause.

== Replacement ==
The Saddledome is one of the oldest arenas in the NHL and the oldest among the seven Canadian franchises, fuelling speculation that it is due to be replaced. Only Madison Square Garden in New York City and Climate Pledge Arena in Seattle are older than the Saddledome; however, Madison Square Garden underwent significant interior renovations during the NHL off-seasons between 2010 and 2013, while Climate Pledge Arena was rebuilt under the original 1962 superstructure of the Washington State Pavilion from 2018 until its reopening in 2021. Flames president and chief executive officer Ken King said in 2008 that plans for a new arena were "five to eight years away" creating the expectation that the team hoped to have a new arena built for when their lease was due to expire in 2014, but such plans never came to fruition. Team chairman Murray Edwards argues that the ability of the facility to host major events and concerts is growing increasingly limited as the facility ages. Along with Edwards, sports financial analysts note that newer arenas generate far more revenue for their teams than the Saddledome does for the Flames.

It is expected that any new arena would also be located either on the Stampede Grounds or elsewhere in downtown Calgary. While NHL Commissioner Gary Bettman has lobbied on behalf of both the Flames and the Oilers for government support, Calgary mayor Naheed Nenshi and alderman John Mar have stated their opposition using taxpayer money to help fund a new arena. King stated that the Flames have concepts and designs for a new building, but are not ready to release them. Some of the plans being considered for Stampede Park would include lowering the city's C-train light rail transit line below ground and run straight into a new facility.

In 2015, Calgary Sports and Entertainment proposed CalgaryNEXT—a sports complex in the western downtown area that would feature a new arena and football stadium to replace the Saddledome and McMahon Stadium. The proposal was shot down in 2017 by Calgary's city council, who voted to support a "plan B" of a new arena on a site adjacent to the existing Saddledome, which is currently used as a parking lot for the Stampede grounds.

On September 12, 2017, King stated that the team was no longer pursuing the arena, as "we've been working for a long time trying to come up with a formula that really works to replace this building and we really put our best foot forward and I’ve come to the conclusion sadly and I'm very disappointed that I don't think we can make a deal that works for us". Mayor Nenshi subsequently proposed a partnership wherein portions of the cost of "plan B" would be covered by the city, and the rest covered by the team ownership and user surcharges. King objected to this proposal.

Critics alleged that the Flames had been trying to use the issue of a new arena to influence the 2017 municipal elections, where Nenshi was elected for a third term as mayor of Calgary. King denied that this was the case, stating that "we did not raise this as an election issue: it became an election issue".

On July 30, 2019, Calgary city council had approved a $550 million Event Centre to replace the Saddledome. The new Event Centre would have been located to the north of the Saddledome in the Victoria Park neighbourhood. The city of Calgary would own the arena while Calgary Sports and Entertainment Corporation would be responsible for the facility's operation and maintenance under a 35-year, no-relocation lease agreement. The new arena had a planned capacity of around 19,000; plans for the Event Centre also included the possibility for a smaller arena to replace the now-demolished Stampede Corral. The Saddledome would have been subsequently demolished had the proposed Event Centre been built.

On April 14, 2021, the deal for the new arena was put on hold by Calgary city council over budget concerns.

On July 26, 2021, the city announced the cost of the arena had gone from $550 million to $608.5 million. The arena was planned on an inverted bowl design which may not have worked on that particular piece of land and would've been bad for accessibility. As the engineers got further into design work, they realized there are some other things, there weren't enough women's bathrooms as well as there may be too many luxury boxes and not enough seats for regular people. To address cost overruns, both the City of Calgary and Calgary Sports and Entertainment Corporation would each be putting forward an additional $12.5 million. The clause was part of the original deal signed in 2019 and has already been approved by council. The Calgary Sports and Entertainment Corporation has agreed to cover anymore cost overruns.

On December 22, 2021, Calgary Sports and Entertainment pulled out of the deal, citing disagreements in significant infrastructure costs ($15 million) and climate mitigation costs ($4 million); costs not previously identified as project costs by CMLC or the City nor included in the $608.5 million target budget in July 2021. Despite this, CSEC intends on staying in the Saddledome.

At a press conference on April 25, 2023, it was announced that the Calgary Event Centre project, estimated to cost $1.22 billion, would be moving forward consisting of a new arena, indoor rink, and indoor and outdoor plazas. The city would pay $537 million, with the Flames owners and the province paying $356 million and $300 million over three years, respectively.

On October 5, 2023, the City of Calgary, Province of Alberta, and CSEC announced that they had finalized agreements for the Calgary Event Centre, with district improvements worth $1.22 billion. On July 22, 2024, ground was broken for the Calgary Event Centre, and its final design and name was unveiled as Scotia Place; the new arena is scheduled to open in time for the 2027–28 NHL season.

The final Flames regular season game at the arena is scheduled to take place on April 10, 2027 against the Vancouver Canucks.

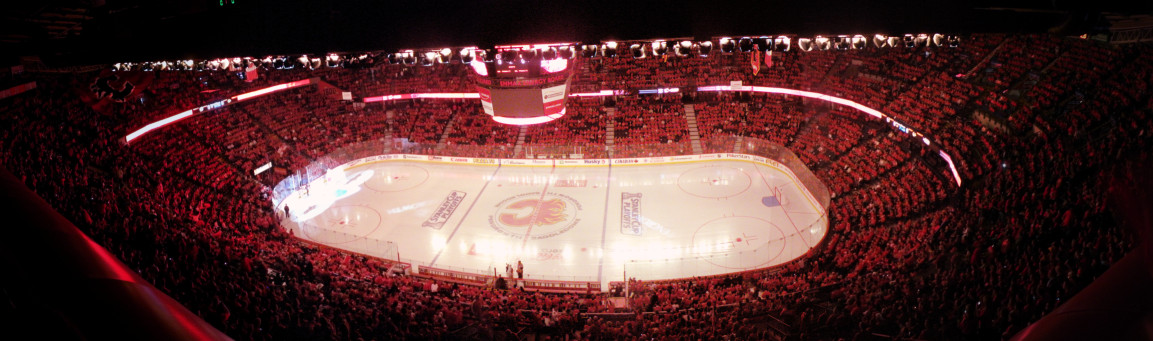
Panoramic view of the interior of the Saddledome, and the "C of Red", prior to a Calgary Flames playoff game

== See also ==
- Arizona Veterans Memorial Coliseum
- Capital Centre
- London Velopark
- Hyperboloid structure
- Tensile architecture
- Thin-shell structure
- List of indoor arenas in Canada

Events and tenants
Preceded by Stampede Corral	Home of the Calgary Flames; 1983 – present	Current holder
Preceded by HSBC Arena & Dwyer Arena, New York	Host of the World Junior Ice; Hockey Championships along with Rexall Place; 2012	Succeeded by Ufa Arena & Ufa Ice Palace, Russia
First Arena	Home of the Calgary Rad'z; 1993	Succeeded by Max Bell Centre
Preceded by Brendan Byrne Arena, New Jersey	Host of the NHL All-Star Game; 1985	Succeeded by Hartford Civic Center, Connecticut
