= Williston Basin Pipeline =

Williston Basin Pipeline is a natural gas pipeline system which moves gas between Wyoming, Montana, South Dakota, and North Dakota. It is owned by MDU Resources Group. Its FERC code is 49.

== See also ==
- List of North American natural gas pipelines
