= SaskEnergy =

Crown corporation of the Saskatchewan government

SaskEnergy Incorporated
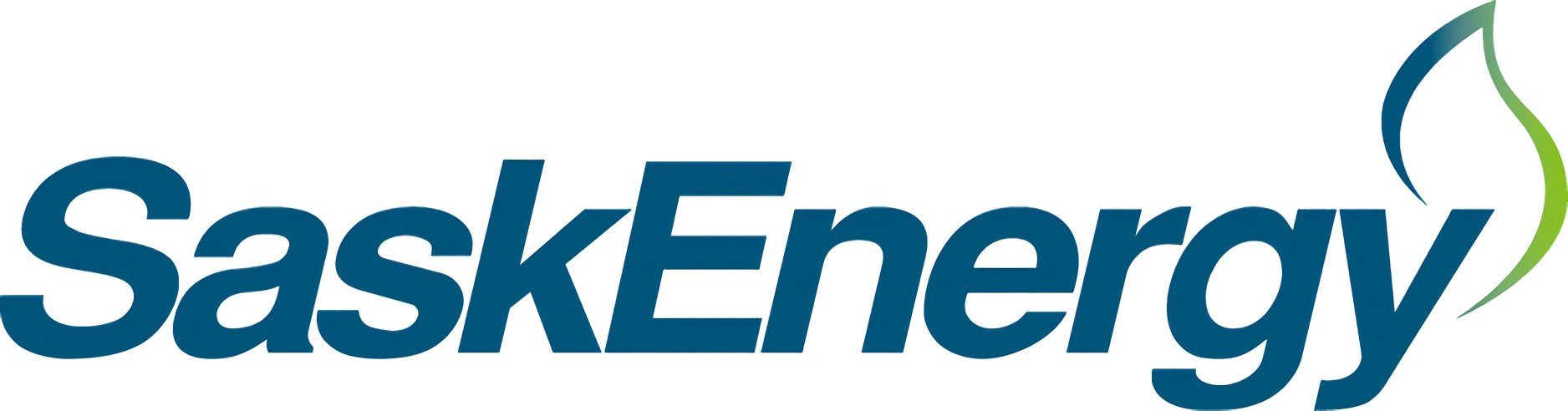
- Type: Crown corporation
- Industry: Natural Gas Public Utility
- Founded: 1952 as the Gas Division of Saskatchewan Power Corporation
- Headquarters: Regina, Saskatchewan, Canada
- Key people: Ken From, President and CEO
- Products: Delivery of Natural Gas
- Revenue: C$541 million (2018-19)
- Net income: C$166 million (2018-19)
- Owner: Government of Saskatchewan
- Number of employees: 1,120 (2022)
- Parent: Crown Investments Corporation
- Subsidiaries: Bayhurst Gas; Many Islands Pipelines; Sask 1st Call; TransGas
- Website: SaskEnergy

SaskEnergy Incorporated is a Crown corporation of the Saskatchewan government, responsible for delivering and selling natural gas to residential, commercial, and industrial customers in the province of Saskatchewan, Canada. The company owns 70,000 kilometres of distribution pipelines, 15,000 kilometres of transmission pipelines, and serves over 405,000 customers. It is governed by The SaskEnergy Act and is the designated subsidiary of Crown Investments Corporation of Saskatchewan.

Natural gas gathering, treatment, compression, storage, and intraprovincial transmission is done via their wholly owned subsidiary TransGas, and interprovincial natural gas transmission is done via their subsidiary Many Islands Pipelines.

Natural gas distribution and marketing is done by SaskEnergy itself.

== History ==
Although natural gas has been used for cooking for thousands of years, and for lighting for hundreds of years, natural gas home heating did not become popular until the mid-20th century.

In Western Canada, most natural gas networks were created by the existing electric utilities (for example: Manitoba Hydro, ENMAX, and BC Hydro). Saskatchewan did the same, and in 1952, the Saskatchewan Power Corporation (now SaskPower) began operating a natural gas transmission and distribution system in Saskatchewan.

In 1988, the Saskatchewan government split up SaskPower, and created the Saskatchewan Energy Corporation, which took over all of SaskPower’s natural gas assets.

== Services ==
In the SaskEnergy Act, SaskEnergy is granted the exclusive right to distribute natural gas within the province of Saskatchewan. Its subsidiary, TransGas, on the other hand, is granted the exclusive right to transport natural gas within Saskatchewan. This means TransGas is responsible to moving natural gas using high-pressure pipelines, and SaskEnergy is responsible for the downstream distribution of natural gas through low-pressure gas lines to consumers.

The Provincial Cabinet regulates SaskEnergy’s delivery service and commodity rates. All rate changes are subject to review by the Saskatchewan Rate Review Panel, an independent body, prior to receiving Provincial Cabinet approval.

In the 2021-2022 fiscal year, SaskEnergy distributed more than 6.3 billion cubic meters of natural gas.
