= Calgary Health Trust =

Canadian philanthropic organization

The Calgary Health Foundation is a philanthropic organization established in 1996 to unite donors, hospitals, health care providers and community partners with the ambitious aim of revolutionizing health outcomes. Since 1996, the Calgary Health Foundation has raised more than $528 million from donations, lotteries and special events. In the year ended March 31, 2020, the organization raised more than $29.8 million in support of health care for Albertans.
