= Emera =

Canadian energy company

Emera Incorporated
- Formerly: NS Power Holdings
- Type: Public
- Traded as: TSX: EMA; S&P/TSX 60 component
- Industry: Electric & Natural Gas Utilities
- Founded: July 23, 1998; 28 years ago
- Headquarters: Halifax, Nova Scotia, Canada
- Areas served: Florida; Atlantic Canada; Caribbean; New Mexico
- Key people: Scott Balfour, President & CEO
- Revenue: ▲CA$8.776 billion (2025)
- Net income: ▲CA$1.090 billion (2025)
- Total assets: ▲CA$44.817 billion (2025)
- Total equity: ▲CA$13.396 billion (2025)
- Number of employees: 7,800 (2025)
- Subsidiaries: Barbados Light & Power Company; Emera Caribbean; Emera Energy; Emera New Brunswick; Emera Newfoundland & Labrador; Nova Scotia Power; St. Lucia Electricity Services; Tampa Electric; Peoples Gas
- Website: www.emera.com

Emera Incorporated is a publicly traded Canadian multinational energy holding company based in Halifax, Nova Scotia. Created in 1998 during the privatization of Nova Scotia Power, a provincial Crown corporation, Emera now invests in regulated electricity generation as well as transmission and distribution across North America and the Caribbean.

== History ==
Emera was created out of the privatization of the provincial Crown corporation Nova Scotia Power Incorporated (NSPI). On December 2, 1998, NSPI shareholders voted to restructure the company to create a holding company which would be shareholder-owned, with the regulated utility being a wholly owned subsidiary of the holding company. On December 9, 1998, NSPI received approval to establish NS Power Holdings Incorporated and NSPI shareholders exchanged their shares in NSPI for shares in NS Power Holdings Inc. on a one-to-one basis on January 1, 1999. Common shares in NS Power Holdings Inc. began trading on the Toronto Stock Exchange and Montreal Stock Exchange on January 6, 1999. The NS Power Holdings Inc. name was changed to Emera Incorporated on July 17, 2000.

In 2013, Emera acquired the Bridgeport Energy, Rumford Power, and Tiverton Power plants from Capital Power Corporation for $541 million.

On September 4, 2015, Emera announced the acquisition of TECO Energy, a utility company based in Tampa, Florida, whose holdings include Tampa Electric, Peoples Gas (no relation to the Chicago-based company of the same name), and New Mexico Gas. Emera paid $10.4 billion for TECO. The deal closed in July 2016.

On May 28, 2025, Emera Inc. became a dual-listed company (TSX and NYSE), trading on the New York Stock Exchange under the ticker symbol EMA.

On October 6, 2026, Emera announced its plans to acquire Canadian Utilities for $14.3 billion.

== Subsidiaries ==
=== Electric Utilities ===
- Nova Scotia Power is a vertically integrated utility in Nova Scotia, with 500,000 customers, and 2487 MW of generating capacity
- Tampa Electric, a vertically integrated utility in the Tampa Bay area of Florida, with 840,000 customers and 6000 MW of generating capacity
- Emera Caribbean is a utility that serves customers in the Caribbean. Its subsidiaries include:
  - A 19.5% equity stake in Light and Power Holdings - LUCELEC in St. Lucia
  - Barbados Light and Power Company in Barbados
- Emera Newfoundland & Labrador
- People's Gas
- Emera New Brunswick

==== Former Subsidiaries ====
- Emera Maine was a utility with 130,000 customers in Maine, created through the merger of Bangor Hydro (acquired in 2002) and Maine Public Service (acquired in 2010). In 2020, Emera Maine was sold to another Canadian utility, ENMAX of Calgary, Alberta. Under ENMAX, the former Emera Maine territory now trades as Versant Power.
- Grand Bahama Power Company in The Bahamas

=== Natural Gas Utilities ===
- Peoples Gas is a natural gas utility in Florida with 470,000 customers.

==== Former Subsidiaries ====
- New Mexico Gas Company, the largest natural gas utility in New Mexico.

=== Other Subsidiaries ===
- Emera Energy trades and markets natural gas and electricity. Power plants owned include:
  - Bear Swamp Hydroelectric Power Station, a 600 MW hydro-electric plant in northern Massachusetts, 50% owned by Emera
- Emera New Brunswick runs the Brunswick Pipeline, a natural gas pipeline through New Brunswick, Canada
- Emera Newfoundland & Labrador, which operates the Maritime Link, an integrated set of transmission assets that deliver renewable electricity from Muskrat Falls in Labrador through Newfoundland to Nova Scotia.
- Emera has a 12.5% ownership stake in the Maritimes and Northeast Pipeline

== See also ==
- Fortis Inc., Another Canadian Maritime Multinational Energy Operator/Investor begun as Newfoundland Light & Power Co.
