= Maritimes & Northeast Pipeline =

Natural gas pipeline in Canada and the United States

The Maritimes and Northeast Pipeline is a natural gas transmission pipeline that runs from the former Sable Offshore Energy Project (SOEP) gas plant in Goldboro, Nova Scotia, Canada to Dracut, Massachusetts, United States.

The 762 mm (30 in) mainline pipeline runs 1,300 km (810 mi) through the Canadian provinces of Nova Scotia and New Brunswick and the United States states of Maine, New Hampshire, and Massachusetts where it connects with the North American natural gas grid in Dracut. There are four lateral pipelines located in New Brunswick and Nova Scotia to serve population and industrial centres. The system has a capacity to carry 440 million cubic feet per day. It is operated by Maritimes and Northeast Pipeline Management Limited of Halifax, Nova Scotia.

The pipeline came into operation in 2000. Prior to this, natural gas was selling for US$2.31 per million BTU in the New England market (February 2000). By December, the price was US$8.45 per million BTU. The abrupt rise in price was attributed to an increase in demand in New England. In contrast, the price of competing heating oil rose from 45 cents to just 58 cents per litre over the same period.

== Laterals ==
The pipeline has four Canadian laterals and five U.S. laterals:

Canadian Laterals:

- Point Tupper Lateral to the Sable Offshore Energy Project gas liquids separation plant - 60 km
- Halifax Lateral to Dartmouth at the Tuft's Cove Generating Station - 124 km
- Moncton Lateral - 12 km
- Saint John Lateral - 111 km

United States Laterals:

- Veazie Lateral
- Bucksport Lateral
- Westbrook Lateral
- Newington Lateral
- Haverhill Lateral

== Owners ==
- Enbridge (77.53%)
- Emera Inc. (12.92%)
- ExxonMobil Canada (9.55%)

== Goldboro LNG ==
In 2014, the Minister of Environment approved the construction of a natural gas liquefaction plant and marine terminal in Goldboro, Nova Scotia. The plant would be fed by the natural gas from the Maritimes and Northeast Pipeline. The LNG produced in the facility would be shipped abroad, mostly to European countries like Germany who have shown special interest in the project through financial agreements. In 2023, after sustained mobilization from local Indigenous communities such as the Mi’kmaq First Nations and environmental activists, the project was abandoned.

=== Environmental Justice Implications of the Project ===
From the outset, the Goldboro LNG plant faced significant opposition from many directions due to adverse environmental implications of the project. Because of a previous environmental assessment for a project on the same site in 2007, the Canadian Environmental Assessment Agency ruled that the Goldboro LNG project did not need another environmental assessment. As a result, Ecojustice lawyers, emphasizing the unlawful nature of such an oversight, petitioned the government for an updated assessment that reflects current climate science. Their claim centered on assertions that the project would lead to GHG emissions that would prevent both the province of Nova Scotia and the Government of Canada from meeting commitments to reduced emissions. Many Mi’kmaq activists have also opposed the establishment of a "man-camp" for the project due to safety concerns surrounding the women in their community. The National Inquiry into Missing and Murdered Indigenous Women and Girls conducted an impact assessment that informed such concerns. The report found that the presence of industrial work camps near Indigenous lands led to increased violence as well as an increase of sexual assaults by 38 percent.
