= Sable Offshore Energy Project =

Natural gas consortium in Canada

Coordinates: 43°57′0″N 59°54′57″W

Location of Sable Island is situated 300 km (190 mi) southeast of Halifax, Nova Scotia shown on map

The Sable Offshore Energy Project (SOEP) was a consortium based in Halifax, Nova Scotia which explored for and produced natural gas near Sable Island on the edge of the Nova Scotian continental shelf in eastern Canada. SOEP produced between 400 and 500 million cubic feet (14,000,000 m^{3}) of natural gas and 20,000 barrels (3,200 m^{3}) of natural gas liquids daily until 2018.

The first tier was completed in 1999 resulting in the development of the Thebaud, North Triumph, and Venture natural gas fields.

== History ==
In 1979 the drill rig Gulftide struck success and the Venture field was discovered. At the time, the cost of developing the gas field proved prohibitive. Extreme North Atlantic Ocean weather and low natural gas prices were blamed. In 1995, improvements in drilling technology along with an increase in natural gas prices made recovering the gas economical allowing SOEP to emerge. In January ground was broken for the Goldboro gas plant. In November, the Galaxy II rig spuds the first production well at the Thebaud field. The Thebaud platform and wellhead were installed in August 1999. In September, the sub-sea pipeline, linking the Sable Island fields to Goldboro gas plant 225 km (140 mi) away, was completed. In November, construction of the fractionation plant and gas plant were completed and the first natural gas was recovered a month later offshore. First gas shipped to market in January 2000.

== Geology ==
The Venture Gas Field was discovered in 1979 when the Venture D-23 well was drilled and is located a few miles off the east end of Sable Island on the Scotian Shelf in 12–20 m of water. The structural trap consists of an east-west trending anticline bounded on the north by a fault, with gas occurring in multiple Upper Jurassic to Lower Cretaceous sandstone reservoirs 1600 m thick at depths from 4 to 6 km.

== Fields ==
The fields of SOEP were developed in two stages, with the cost of development of an estimated field life of 25 years. The Thebaud, North Triumph, and Venture were developed in the first stage and completed in 1999.

The first Phase II platform, Alma, came onstream in late 2003 while production from South Venture, the second field began late in 2004.

== Facilities ==
Offshore

- Thebaud Processing Facility
- Venture platform
- North Triumph platform
- Alma Facilities
- South Venture platform

Onshore

- Point Tupper Fractionation Plant (Point Tupper, Richmond County)

== Consortium partners ==
- ExxonMobil Canada Properties Limited
- Shell Canada Limited
- Imperial Oil
- Mosbacher Operating Limited
- Cona Resources Ltd.

== See also ==
- Maritimes & Northeast Pipeline pipeline infrastructure to deliver gas
