= Ovintiv =

U.S. energy company

Ovintiv Inc.
- Formerly: Encana
- Type: Public company
- Traded as: NYSE: OVV; S&P 400 component
- ISIN: US69047Q1022
- Industry: Petroleum industry
- Predecessors: Encana Corporation; PanCanadian Energy Corporation; Alberta Energy Company; AEC West
- Founded: April 2002; 24 years ago as Encana; January 24, 2020; 6 years ago as Ovintiv
- Headquarters: Denver, Colorado
- Key people: Peter Dea, Board Chair; Brendan McCracken, President & CEO; Corey Code, EVP & CFO
- Products: Petroleum; Natural gas Natural gas liquids
- Production output: 614.5 thousand barrels of oil equivalent (3,759,000 GJ) per day (2025)
- Revenue: ▼US$8.908 billion (2025)
- Operating income: ▼US$1.131 million (2025)
- Net income: ▲US$1.242 million (2025)
- Total assets: ▲US$20.390 billion (2025)
- Total equity: ▲US$11.195 billion (2025)
- Number of employees: 1,465 (2025)
- Website: www.ovintiv.com

Ovintiv Inc., based in Denver, is an American company engaged in hydrocarbon exploration. The company was previously known as Encana, which, in 2020, restructured from a company domiciled in Canada to a company domiciled in the United States. The company's operations are mainly in the Permian Basin in the United States and in the Montney Formation, where it has a partnership with Mitsubishi, in Canada.

The company is ranked 438th on the Fortune 500 and 1262nd on the Forbes Global 2000. As of December 31, 2025, the company had proved reserves of 2,325 million barrels of oil equivalent (1.422×10^{10} GJ), of which 19% was petroleum, 31% was natural gas liquids, and 50% was natural gas.

== History ==
=== As Encana (2002-2019) ===
EnCana logo

In April 2002, Encana was formed by the merger of PanCanadian Petroleum with Alberta Energy Company. In July 2003, the company agreed to pay $20 million to resolve allegations by the United States Commodity Futures Trading Commission that a subsidiary of the company reported false natural gas trading information, including price and volume information, to certain reporting firms in an attempt to skew indexes for its financial benefit.

In spring 2008, after complaints from residents in Pavillion, Wyoming, the United States Environmental Protection Agency found hydrocarbon contaminants in residents' drinking water wells near gas production wells owned by the company.

Between October 2008 and January 2009, in Pouce Coupe, British Columbia, in the 2008–09 British Columbia pipeline bombings, five Encana pipelines were bombed, likely by a disgruntled community member with a grudge against the company. Encana was fined CAD $250,000 under Canada's Environmental Emergency Act after a pipeline rupture near Pouce Coupe released a cloud of gas that contained hydrogen sulfide.

From 2008 through 2010, the company accumulated 250,000 net acres in the Collingwood-Utica Shale gas play in the Middle Ordovician Collingwood formation of the Michigan Basin at an average cost of $150/acre. In May 2012, the company paid about $185 an acre for oil and gas rights on 2,156 acres (873 hectares) at an auction by the Michigan Department of Natural Resources, which was "88 percent less than the average paid two years ago in the area".

In November 2009, the company completed the corporate spin-off of its oil business, Cenovus Energy. E-mails between the company and Chesapeake Energy showed plans to divide up Michigan counties state land leases to suppress land prices in an October 2010 auction. In 2013, a private landowner filed suit against the company and Chesapeake for bid rigging. While the case was dropped by the United States Department of Justice, the company was fined $5 million by the Michigan Attorney General, while Chesapeake paid $25 million into a victim-compensation fund.

In December 2012, the company announced a US$2.1 billion joint venture with state-owned, Beijing-based PetroChina through which PetroChina received a 49.9% stake in Encana's Duvernay Formation acreage in Alberta. In 2013, the company moved its headquarters to The Bow in Calgary, a newly completed building which was the tallest building in Canada outside of Toronto.

In September 2017, Hunter Ridge, a subsidiary of the company, was fined $225,000 for a pipeline leak that contaminated water and soil on a big game hunting ranch near Parachute, Colorado. In May 2018, the company permanently ceased production at Deep Panuke. The Deep Panuke project produced and processed natural gas 250 kilometers offshore southeast of Halifax, Nova Scotia. The platform was sent for recycling in 2020.

=== As Ovintiv (2020-present) ===
On January 24, 2020, after receiving shareholder approval, the company completed the transfer of its corporate domicile from Canada to the United States. Ovintiv Canada ULC retains an office in Calgary. The shift came after the company's acquisition of Newfield Exploration, after which most of its production was in the United States.

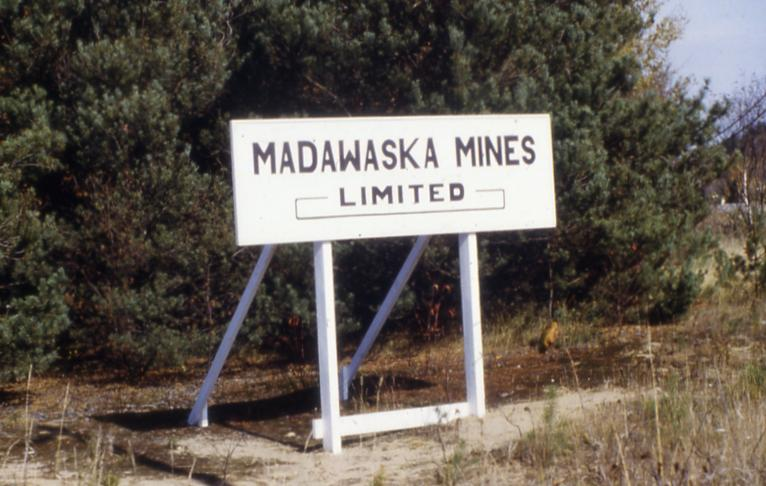
Madawaska Mine sign c. 1985

In June 2020, the company announced layoffs of 25% of its workforce. In February 2022, Ovintiv absorbed former subsidiary EWL Management Limited making it the owner of five decommissioned mines in Ontario: Coldstream Copper Mine, Gordon Lake Mine, Greyhawk Mine (uranium), Dyno Mine (uranium), and Madawaska Mine (uranium) which is being rehabilitated to meet current compliant standards.

In September 2024, Ovintiv paid the United States and the state of Utah a civil penalty of $5.5 million and agreed to implement extensive compliance measures to achieve major reductions in pollutants emitted from 139 of its facilities in Utah to resolve allegations that it failed to comply with federal and state requirements to capture and control air emissions at 22 of its oil and gas production facilities in the Uintah Basin.

=== Acquisitions and divestitures ===
Date	Acquisition / Divestiture	Company	Price	Ref(s).
October 2004	Divestiture	UK operations including a 43% stake in the Buzzard oil field sold to Nexen Energy	$2.1 billion	
January 2007	Divestiture	Assets in Chad sold to China National Petroleum Corporation	$202.5 million	
May 2007	Divestiture	Assets in the delta of the Mackenzie River	Undisclosed	
December 2011	Divestiture	Majority of natural gas producing assets in the Barnett Shale	Undisclosed	
February 2012	Divestiture	40% interest in the Cutbank Ridge Partnership, which involves 409,000 net acres of Montney Formation; sold to Mitsubishi	C$2.9 billion	
February 2012	Divestiture	Midstream assets in the Cutbank Ridge; sold to Veresen	C$920 million	
June 2014	Divestiture	Bighorn assets in Alberta; sold to Jupiter Resources	US$1.8 billion	
November 2014	Acquisition	Athlon Energy	$7.1 billion	
May 2014	Divestiture	Jonah Field operations in Sublette County, Wyoming; sold to Jonah Energy LLC	Undisclosed	
June 2014	Acquisition	Assets in the Eagle Ford Group from Freeport-McMoRan	$3.1 billion	
August 2015	Divestiture	assets in the Haynesville Shale; sold to affiliates of GSO Capital Partners and GeoSouthern Energy	$850 million	
July 2016	Divestiture	Assets in the Denver Basin	$900 million	
June 2017	Divestiture	Assets in the Piceance Basin	$735 million	
December 2018	Divestiture	Assets in the San Juan Basin	$480 million	
February 2019	Acquisition	Newfield Exploration	$7.7 billion in stock and assumption of debt	
June 2023	Acquisition	Assets in the Permian Basin	$4.275 billion in cash and stock	
January 2025	Acquisition	Assets in the Montney Formation; acquired from Paramount Resources	$2.307 billion	
January 2026	Divestiture	Assets in the Uinta Basin	$2.0 billion	
February 2026	Acquisition	NuVista Energy	$2.7 billion	
February 2026	Divestiture	Assets in the Anadarko Basin	$3.0 billion	

== Leadership ==
=== President ===
1. Gwyn Morgan, 5 April 2002 – 31 December 2005
2. Randall Kerry Eresman, 1 January 2006 – 11 January 2013
3. Clayton Harvey Woitas (interim), 11 January 2013 – 11 June 2013
4. Doug Suttles, 11 June 2013 – 10 September 2019
5. Michael Gerard McAllister, 10 September 2019 – 24 January 2020
6. Michael G. McAllister, January 24, 2020 – June 30, 2020
7. Brendan M. McCracken, December 1, 2020 – current

=== Chairman of the Board ===
1. David P. O'Brien, 5 April 2002 – 24 July 2013
2. Clayton Harvey Woitas, 24 July 2013– 24 January 2020
3. Clayton H. Woitas, January 24, 2020 – June 30, 2020
4. Peter A. Dea, June 30, 2020 – current

== In popular culture ==
Encana's hydraulic fracturing operations in the United States are portrayed in the 2010 documentary, Gasland, which alleges that hydraulic fracturing causes pollution of ground and surface water, air, and soil.
