= Wiebo Ludwig =

Canadian activist

- Born: 19 December 1941; Haulerwijk, Friesland, Netherlands
- Died: 9 April 2012 (aged 70) near Hythe, Alberta, Canada
- Known for: suspect in the 2008–09 British Columbia pipeline bombings

Wiebo Arienes Ludwig (19 December 1941 – 9 April 2012) was the leader of a Christian community named Trickle Creek, just outside Hythe, Alberta, Canada. He was best known for his legal problems arising from his conflict with the oil and gas industry. He was convicted in R v Ludwig [2000] AJ v509 at 293 on several counts (see infra) for sabotaging oil and gas wells. From the early 1990s until the time that he died, Ludwig consistently accused the industry of poisoning his family and farm through their attempts to extract toxic sour gas from the Peace River region of Alberta.

== Background ==
Ludwig was born during World War II and immigrated to Canada with his family from Friesland in the northern part of the Netherlands shortly after the war. He had seven older siblings. The family maintained strong religious beliefs and most kept ties with the Dutch Reformed Church or held some form of Baptist beliefs. In his early life, Ludwig worked as a carpenter and as a drywaller. He later studied pastoral ministry at Iowa's Dordt College which is associated with the Christian Reformed Church. While studying at Dordt, Wiebo met his future wife, Mamie, with whom he later had eleven children. Ludwig completed his pastoral education at the Calvin Theological Seminary in Grand Rapids, Michigan.

After Ludwig completed his pastoral education, his initial application for ordination was rejected, possibly because his leadership style was perceived as being too authoritarian. He successfully appealed the decision and went on to serve as pastor at Bethlehem Christian Reformed Chruch from 1976 to 1977 in Thunder Bay, Ontario and Trinity Christian Reformed Church from 1978 to 1980 in Goderich, Ontario. Ludwig's leadership of the churches was controversial. In 1985, he led a group (his family and another family) to settle in a remote farming community near Hythe, Alberta, approximately 500 km northwest of the provincial capital of Edmonton. The small farming community started with a quarter section (160 acres), eventually added another, and grew into a self-sustaining community. The property contains several dozen buildings, including a biodiesel refinery, a greenhouse, and a mill. After the addition of windmills and solar panels, the community became capable of generating its own power, and a large computer-controlled boiler generates heat for the community's houses. Ludwig named the community "Trickle Creek".

In 1985, there was only one sour gas well within a 2-mile radius of Trickle Creek; in the intervening 15 years, there were at least 10.

== Confrontations with authority ==
In the early 1990s, oil companies in northern Alberta began building sour gas wells on land they owned near Trickle Creek. Ludwig believed he had linked the flared hydrogen sulfide sour gas and leaks from the wells with stillbirths, deformations, and miscarriages that began to occur in the community at the time, and began to protest sour gas development near his community. He appealed to both provincial and federal levels of government to regulate sour gas extraction near the community, but the government did not respond. Ludwig then produced a video titled "Home Sour Home" in order to gain broader attention. In an effort to gain the attention of the government he appeared at the government offices of Grande Prairie and poured sour crude oil on the lobby carpet. His appeals for government intervention were not successful.

Latterly, the U.S. Occupational Safety and Health Administration has acknowledged that "hydrogen sulfide in the air is an irritant and a chemical asphyxiant that can alter both oxygen utilization and the (human) central nervous system". In 2013, Enbridge won the US Federal Energy Regulatory Commission's permission to refuse delivery of any oil with hydrogen sulfide that exceeded 5 parts per million, half the maximum exposure recommended by federal regulators, finding levels as high as 1,200 parts per million in some crude oil shipments from Bakken formation crude oil.

=== AEC West bombings ===
There were hundreds of acts of vandalism against natural gas sites across northern Alberta in the 1990s. Many of these attacks were against AEC West, the main company operating near Trickle Creek. The company negotiated with Ludwig in an attempt to buy his farm; but, two days after these negotiations failed, two of its wells 30 km from the farm were destroyed by explosions. A few days after these explosions, Ludwig stated: "If the oil companies run roughshod over your lives, you have to take defensive action against them, whatever is necessary... You can't just let them kill your children."

In 1998 the RCMP charged Ludwig for an attack on a Suncor well that occurred days after one of Ludwig's grandchildren was delivered stillborn. At a January 1999 bail hearing, the lawyer for Ludwig and another defendant revealed that RCMP officers had bombed an oil installation as part of a dirty tricks campaign during their investigation of acts against oil industry installations. The information was confirmed by crown prosecutors.

In April 2000 Ludwig was convicted and sentenced to 28 months in jail. He was convicted of five offenses, including blowing up one well, vandalizing another by pouring concrete into it, and counseling an undercover police officer to buy dynamite. In October 2000 he attempted to run for the leadership of the Alberta Social Credit Party, but was forced to withdraw from the leadership contest after a judge refused to waive the conditions of his bail. He served time at a minimum security prison in Grande Cache, and was eventually released after only 19 months. He maintained his innocence after being released.

=== Death of Karman Willis ===
A teenage girl, Karman Willis, was killed in Trickle Creek in an incident that occurred in 1999 when a pickup truck full of adolescents trespassed on the Trickle Creek farm. Some residents of the farm, who were camping in the path of the truck, feared for their safety, and an unidentified person shot at the truck. Ludwig called 911, explaining to the operator that shots had been fired. The subsequent police investigation suggested that the bullet hit the bottom of the truck, then ricocheted up and hit Willis in the chest. A bullet also hit a second teen in the arm, but he survived. Police were never able to identify the shooter, and were not able to recover the weapon. No one was ever charged with the death, and local residents still refer to the exact nature of events that happened on the night of the shooting as "a mystery".

=== Indictments and convictions ===
On 11 February 2000, 18 charges were laid against Ludwig and fellow commune member Richard Boonstra. Of these charges, on 20 April Judge Sanderman found that Ludwig had:

- counselled another to possess an explosive substance;
- attempted the possession of fake dynamite;
- done mischief by interfering with the lawful use and enjoyment of property, sec 430.1.c;
- done mischief by destroying property; and
- possessed an explosive substance.

He was sentenced to 28 months in jail. At the time in Canada, sentences of over 24 months required that time be spent in a federal penitentiary. Boonstra was sentenced to 21 days.

After being released from prison Ludwig largely faded from media attention. In 2002 journalist Andrew Nikiforuk wrote a book on Ludwig, Saboteurs: Wiebo Ludwig's War Against Big Oil. In 2003 a made-for-TV movie was produced, Burn: The Robert Wraight Story, which was based on the life of an informant who had cooperated with the RCMP to provide evidence supporting Ludwig's conviction.

=== Encana bombings ===
In 2008, a series of letters threatening local gas companies was anonymously sent to the Dawson Creek Daily News and Coffee Talk Express in Chetwynd, B.C. The letters threatened Encana to cease its operations near the small town of Tomslake, B.C., just south of Dawson Creek, and close to Trickle Creek. Following these letters local pipelines were hit by six explosions. Because these explosions were similar to other acts of vandalism which had occurred around Ludwig's farm, police suspected his involvement. Following the bombings Encana offered a reward of up to a million dollars for information leading to the arrest and prosecution of the bomber. In September 2009 Ludwig wrote an open letter to the bomber(s) supporting their cause but encouraging them to stop their bombings.

After forensics experts found Ludwig's DNA on two of the letters, police arrested Ludwig in 2010 at a Super 8 Motel in Grande Prairie, where Ludwig had been invited on the pretext of helping with the investigation. After arresting Ludwig the RCMP then conducted a four-day search of Trickle Creek involving over a hundred RCMP officers. The RCMP found evidence which they believed was incriminating during the search, including potassium nitrate (an explosive chemical), 75 grams of marijuana, some chemistry books, handwritten notes which police believed detailed the location of hidden weapons, and notebooks full of information on Dawson Creek, the Canadian government, oil pipelines, and the oil and gas industry. Ludwig explained that the potassium nitrate was for toy rockets, that the marijuana was an anaesthetic, and that the chemistry texts were for homeschooling the community's children. A book on property terrorism was also found on Ludwig's nightstand, but Ludwig explained that it had been a gift. Ludwig was held in custody for a day. He was told that he would be charged with extortion, but was eventually released without being charged.

== Death ==
Ludwig was diagnosed with esophageal cancer in 2011. He used an alternative medicine regimen that included injections of vitamin C and hydrogen peroxide. He also received conventional pain relievers and a stent in his throat enabling him to swallow. In the same year Ludwig was also the subject of a documentary, Wiebo's War, which treated his life and conflict with the oil and gas industry sympathetically. In February 2012, Ludwig built his own coffin, and he did his final media interview with journalist Byron Christopher.

Ludwig died two months later, on April 9, in his log cabin. His last words were a request that his family not quarrel, and that they keep their faith. He was buried almost immediately in an above-ground crypt in a forest near his home. The funeral ceremony was private. The day after Ludwig died, RCMP officers asked his family if they could open Ludwig's coffin to take his body's fingerprints in order to verify his death, but Ludwig's family refused, calling the request "'odd,' 'invasive' and 'a terrible disrespect and interference' with human remains". RCMP officers explained that it is common for police to take fingerprints from a recently deceased person if that person has a criminal record, but third-party experts disputed this claim.

== Bibliography ==
- Blackwell, Tom. "Sympathy for an Eco-warrior". The National Post. May 8, 2011. Retrieved September 14, 2012.
- Canadian Press. "Wiebo Ludwig Picks Alternative Cancer Treatment". CTV News. October 22, 2011. Retrieved September 14, 2011.
- Canadian Press|Associated Press. "Oilpatch Bomber Wiebo Ludwig, Warrior to Some, Terrorist to Others, Dead at 70" Yahoo! News. April 10, 2012. Retrieved September 24, 2012.
- Christopher, Byron. "Weibo's Final Battle". The Dominion. March 16, 2012. Retrieved September 14, 2012.
- Christopher, Byron. "A Dead Man's Prints". The Dominion. September 14, 2012. Retrieved October 6, 2012.
- Mertz, Emily. "Timeline: The Life of Wiebo Ludwig". Global Edmonton. April 10, 2012. Retrieved April 10, 2012.
- News1130 Staff. "Arrest Made in Connection with EnCana Pipeline Bombings". News1130. January 8, 2010. Retrieved September 14, 2012.
- Stueck, Wendy. "Wiebo Ludwig, polarizing figure in the oil patch, dies at 70" The Globe and Mail. September 6, 2012. Retrieved September 14, 2012.
- Wilton, Lisa. "Film Set to Ignite Ludwig Tale". Jam! Showbiz. October 20, 2002. Retrieved September 24, 2012.
- Wittmeier, Brent. "Eco-activist, Convicted Pipeline Bomber Wiebo Ludwig Dead at 70" The National Post. April 9, 2011. Retrieved September 13, 2012.
