= 2008–09 British Columbia pipeline bombings =

Terrorist incidents in Canada

The 2008–09 British Columbia pipeline bombings were a series of bombs that targeted gas pipelines owned by EnCana near the towns of Dawson Creek and Tomslake, British Columbia. The first blast occurred on October 12, 2008 and the second overnight between October 15 and October 16. The third was discovered on October 31 and a fourth was reported on January 5, 2009. The attacks brought to question the safety of the energy installations in Canada.

== Timeline ==
On October 31, 2008 letters were sent to local media outlets warning oil and gas companies to leave the area saying: "We will no longer negotiate with terrorists which you are as you keep endangering our families with crazy expansion of deadly gas wells in our home lands". The Royal Canadian Mounted Police warned the companies; however no further action was taken.

On October 12 an explosion occurred on a sour gas pipeline to the east of Dawson Creek British Columbia. The explosion left a 2.5 meter and 2 meter deep crater but did not rupture the pipeline. Had the explosion ruptured the pipeline, toxic gases would most likely have been released. The RCMP sent a specialized team to investigate the explosion four days later.

On October 16 a second blast hit a natural gas pipeline. Workers discovered the blast site at approximately 10:00 a.m. MT off of British Columbia Highway 2. This explosion also did not rupture the pipeline but left a crater in the ground. Following the explosion the Integrated National Security Enforcement Team (INSET) were called in to assist in the investigation of the explosion.

The following day RCMP called a press conference to state that they believe the public is safe despite admitting that it would be very difficult to protect the large expanse of pipeline in the area.

On October 24 police arrested a person in Alberta they believe may have had something to do with the blasts.

On October 31, a third bomb detonated at a natural gas wellhead in the region of Dawson Creek (12 kilometers northwest of Tomslake). Encana reported minimal damage.

On January 5, 2009 a fourth blast destroyed a metering shed near the community of Tomslake.

== Investigation ==
The RCMP spokesman Sgt.Tim Shields said to the public that they believed the bombings were not an act of terrorism, but vandalism, and simply an act of sabotage by one person or group. Authorities believed that the explosion may come from a local landowner with a grudge to EnCana On October 17 RCMP spokesman Sgt. Tim Shields released the following statement: "We believe someone or a group of people have set two deliberate explosions that were intended to rupture and blow up a natural-gas pipeline".

It has also been suggested by Dan Przybylski, author of Dawson Creek Daily News, that the bombings may be associated with the growing annoyance amongst the agricultural community of having pipelines crisscrossing the land. Wiebo Ludwig was arrested in connection with the pipeline bombings on January 8, 2010. He was previously convicted in 2001 of similar bombings which targeted oil and gas pipelines. After an extensive search of his farm by the Royal Canadian Mounted Police, he was released without charge. After the explosion, anonymous letters, received by the local news media, warned ENcana that their business would end and the pipelines and wellheads damaged from the explosion would suffer worse if ENcana does not shut down their operations. ENcana's spokesman Alan Boras told the press that the company will not leave the area, despite all the threats that are in the letter, even after the incident. Police say that they will not reveal whether they believed that the letters they received came directly from someone who was involved in planning the explosions. However, authorities say they have got DNA from the letters. A letter, named the "April letter" made several threats and warned that a "long hot summer is coming"; but the summer came without further bombings; nor have any letters come out since then. The April letter was typed, while previous threatening letters were handwritten. Authorities had already determined that one of the earliest letters was a hoax. According to Dawson Creek Staff Sergeant Darren Traichevich, investigators have not been able to confirm that the April letter and the other two were connected.
