= List of people from The Woodlands, Texas =

This is a list of people who were born, were raised, or have lived in The Woodlands, Texas.

== Arts, media, and entertainment ==
- Kevin Abstract — rapper, singer-songwriter, director and founder of hip-hop boy band Brockhampton
- Kirby Bliss Blanton — actress, known for role in 2012 film Project X
- Will Butler — brother of Win Butler and core member of Arcade Fire
- Win Butler — brother of Will Butler and frontman for the Grammy Award-winning Canadian indie rock group Arcade Fire
- Hayes Carll — country musician
- Chamillionaire — rapper
- Matt Champion — rapper, singer-songwriter, and member of hip-hop boy band Brockhampton
- Jack Ingram — country musician
- Parker McCollum — country musician
- Mallory Bechtel — musical theatre actress

== Athletics ==
- Simone Biles - Olympic Gymnast
- Danny Amendola — NFL player, Houston Texans, 2-time Super Bowl champion
- Trevor Bauer — MLB player, Los Angeles Dodgers, winner of National League's 2020 Cy Young Award
- Lance Blanks — retired NBA player
- Matt Bullard — retired NBA player
- Boudreaux Campbell — professional bull rider
- KJ Choi — PGA Tour Golfer
- Kassidy Cook — Olympic Diver, Olympic Silver Medalist
- Jim Deshaies — former Major League Baseball pitcher; announcer for the Chicago Cubs
- Doug Drabek — MLB player, winner of National League's 1990 Cy Young Award
- Kyle Drabek — MLB player, son of Doug Drabek
- Brett Eibner — MLB player
- Arian Foster — retired NFL player, 4-time Pro Bowl, 1-time All-Pro
- Justin Gilbert — NFL player, Cleveland Browns
- Paul Goldschmidt — MLB player, St Louis Cardinals, high school teammate of Kyle Drabek
- Quentin Grimes — NBA player, Philadelphia 76ers
- Chad Hedrick — retired Winter Olympian, 5-time medalist long track speed skating, most decorated inline world champion
- A.J. Hinch — former MLB player and manager of the Detroit Tigers
- Gerald Irons — retired NFL player for Cleveland Browns and Oakland Raiders
- Larry Izzo — retired NFL linebacker; assistant coach for Seattle Seahawks
- Daniel Lasco — NFL player
- Stacy Lewis — LPGA golfer, 2011 Kraft Nabisco champion; 2012 LPGA Player of the Year
- Jeff Maggert — PGA Senior Tour golfer, top-5 finishes in Masters, U.S. Open, British Open and PGA Championship
- Nick Mitchell — former professional wrestler
- Brad North — MLS player
- Lillie Nordmann — U.S. Swimmer
- Chris Paul — NBA player, Los Angeles Clippers
- Adrian Peterson — retired NFL player, 2007 Offensive Rookie of the Year, 2012 MVP, 4-time All-Pro, 7-time Pro Bowl
- Rusty Pierce — retired MLS player
- Brennan Poole — race car driver
- Austin Pruitt — MLB pitcher, Tampa Bay Rays
- Patrick Reed — PGA Tour golfer, winner of the 2018 Masters Tournament
- Jameson Taillon — baseball player, drafted 2nd overall by Pittsburgh Pirates in 2010 MLB draft
- Laura Wilkinson — 2000 Olympic champion, first gold medal for female American platform diver since 1964
- Torrie Wilson — retired professional wrestler, fitness competitor and model; co-owner of the fashion boutique "Officially Jaded" in Market Street
- Ellis Wyms — retired NFL player

== Business and industry ==
- George Bishop — founder and CEO, GeoSouthern Energy
- Greg Brenneman — Chairman, President and CEO of the private equity firm CCMP, former CEO of Burger King
- George P. Mitchell (1919–2013), American businessman, real estate developer, and pioneer of shale gas technology
- Roy C. Strickland — businessman and politician

== Government and the law ==
- Kevin Brady — former Republican U.S. Representative for Texas's 8th congressional district
- Mark Keough — Republican State Representative for District 15 of the Texas House of Representatives, businessman, Christian pastor, radio host, and educator
- Steve Toth — former Republican State Representative for District 15 of the Texas House of Representatives (2013–2015, 2019–Present), businessman

== Military ==
- Lincoln Jones – US Army major general
