= Claiborne P. Deming =

American businessman

- Education: Tulane University (BA); Tulane University Law School (JD)
- Occupations: Attorney, business executive
- Spouse: Elaine Deming

Claiborne P. Deming is an American attorney, business executive and philanthropist. He served as the president and chief executive officer of Murphy Oil from 1994 to 2008. Since 2008, he has served as its chairman. Additionally, he serves as senior advisor to TPH Partners, an energy private equity firm. As a philanthropist, he has supported public schools in Arkansas and private universities in the Southern United States.

== Early life ==
Claiborne P. Deming graduated from Tulane University, where he received a Bachelor of Arts degree in 1976. He received a JD from the Tulane University Law School in 1979.

== Career ==
Deming began working as an attorney for Murphy Oil in 1979. A decade later, in 1989, he was promoted to president of Murphy Oil USA, its US-based subsidiary. He later served as president of Murphy Oil USA and executive vice president and chief operating officer of Murphy Oil USA. He served as the chief executive officer and President of Murphy Oil from October 1994 to December 31, 2008. While CEO of Murphy Oil Corp. In 2008, he earned a total compensation of $8,383,411, which included a base salary of $1,241,667, a cash bonus of $2,000,000, stocks granted of $2,675,025, and options granted of $2,211,250. He has served on its board of directors since 1993.

Deming serves as the chairman of Murphy Oil. He also serves as senior advisor to TPH Partners, an energy private equity firm.

Deming served on the board of directors of Entergy from 2002 to 2006. He served as the president of the 25-Year Club of the Petroleum Industry. He serves as the chairman of the National Petroleum Council.

== Philanthropy ==
Deming served as president of the El Dorado Education Foundation. He was a member of the Arkansas State Board of Education from September 1999 to June 2002.

Deming serves as a member of the Tulane Law School Dean's Advisory Board and member of the Business School Council for A. B. Freeman School of Business at Tulane University. He serves on the board of directors of the Jefferson Scholarship at the University of Virginia. Additionally, he serves on the Board of Trust of Vanderbilt University. As of 2015, he is one of the largest donors to the university, having donated US$25,000 or above.

Deming and his wife have donated US$10,000 to the Aspen Institute.

== Personal life ==
With his wife Elaine, he resides in El Dorado, Arkansas.
