= PanCanadian Petroleum =

Canadian petroleum company (1971–2002)

PanCanadian Petroleum Limited
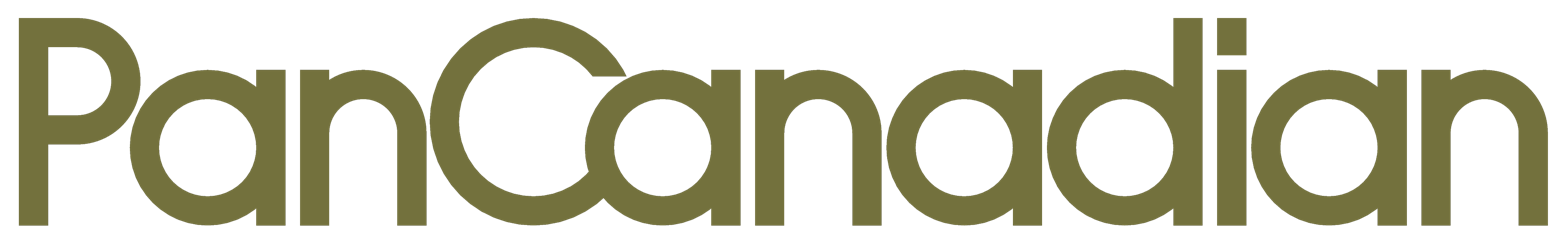
- Traded as: TSX: PCP
- Industry: Petroleum
- Predecessor: Canadian Pacific Oil and Gas; Central-Del Rio Oils
- Founded: 31 December 1971
- Defunct: 4 April 2002
- Fate: Merged with the Alberta Energy Company
- Successor: EnCana
- Headquarters: PanCanadian Plaza, 150 9 Ave SW, Calgary, Alberta

PanCanadian Petroleum Limited was a Canadian independent petroleum company that operated between 1971 and 2002. The company was created through the merger of Canadian Pacific Oil and Gas Limited and Central-Del Rio Oils Limited. PanCanadian inherited the freehold mineral rights included in land grants the Canadian Pacific Railway had received in the 1880s, and therefore possessed a massive land base to explore for oil and gas. Through its entire life, PanCanadian was owned approximately 87 percent by the CPR's holding company. In 2002, PanCanadian merged with the Alberta Energy Company to form EnCana, which at the time was the world's largest independent petroleum company.

== Predecessor companies ==
=== Canadian Pacific Oil and Gas ===
PanCanadian's history traces back to 1881 and the foundation of the Canadian Pacific Railway Company. As an incentive to complete the trans-continental railway, the Government of Canada granted the CPR 25 million acres of land, including mineral rights, in Manitoba, Saskatchewan, and Alberta. Although the company sold of much of this land, at the start of World War I it still held mineral rights on 9.6 million acres. In 1883, while the railway was under construction, a crew drilled a well 35 miles west of Medicine Hat in search of water for the company's steam locomotives. The well, called CPR Langevin No. 1, was located in section 3-29-15-10 W4. Rather than water, the well produced gas. The following year, the CPR drilled a second gas well nearby. In 1906 the CPR hired Eugene Marius Coste (1859–1940) to manage its gas operations, and in 1912 set up its Department of Natural Resources, based in Calgary. Over the subsequent decades the CPR operated its properties passively and collected royalties from production leases.

In 1958, Canadian Pacific president Norris R. "Buck" Crump (1904–1989) undertook an aggressive diversification programme that resulted in the formation of Canadian Pacific Oil and Gas Limited. The new subsidiary, whose president was the English-born John McGuire Taylor (1917–1995), began exploring and developing oil and gas actively on its land holdings. In 1962, Crump created a holding company, Canadian Pacific Investments Limited, as a subsidiary of Canadian Pacific Limited. CP Investments managed the company's non-rail businesses, which included petroleum, forestry, minerals, steel, real estate, and hotels.

=== Central-Del Rio Oils ===
Central Leduc Oils Limited was incorporated in July 1947, five months after the Leduc No. 1 discovery. The company's founder was Neil McQueen (1899–1976), who had recently left Pacific Petroleums. In the post-Leduc rush, McQueen filed on 16,000 acres of Canadian Pacific leases south of Edmonton. He shared his leases with Duncan Charles MacDonald (1884–1953), who formed a company called Del Rio Producers Limited. McQueen's leases resulted in a small producing well on the edge of the Leduc field. In 1954, McQueen acquired permits for 400,000 acres of land in southeastern Saskatchewan. The exploration on these leases resulted in the discovery of the Weyburn field, Saskatchewan's largest oil field. In 1957, Central Leduc and Del Rio merged to form Central-Del Rio Oils Limited.

Canadian Pacific Oil and Gas had begun purchasing shares of Central-Del Rio sometime after its creation, and by 1964 held 18.1 percent of its shares. Its interest in Central-Del Rio stemmed from the latter's Weyburn holdings. In 1964, CPOG increased its holdings to 43.5 percent, and later increased them further to 51.6 percent.

== History of PanCanadian ==
=== Creation of PanCanadian ===
In 1969, CPOG and Central-Del Rio entered an agreement whereby Central would acquire all outstanding shares of CPOG, and in turn, Central would grant CPOG an issue of 23.7 million shares. This issue of shares was transferred to CP Investments, bringing its total holdings of Central to 89.3 percent. On 31 December 1971, the two companies merged formally to create PanCanadian Petroleum Limited. The new company's first president was John M. Taylor from CPOG, while its chairman was Robert William Campbell (1922–2008), an American expatriate and former Home Oil Company executive. Upon its creation, PanCanadian held the largest base of freehold petroleum leases of any Canadian oil company.

=== Operating history ===
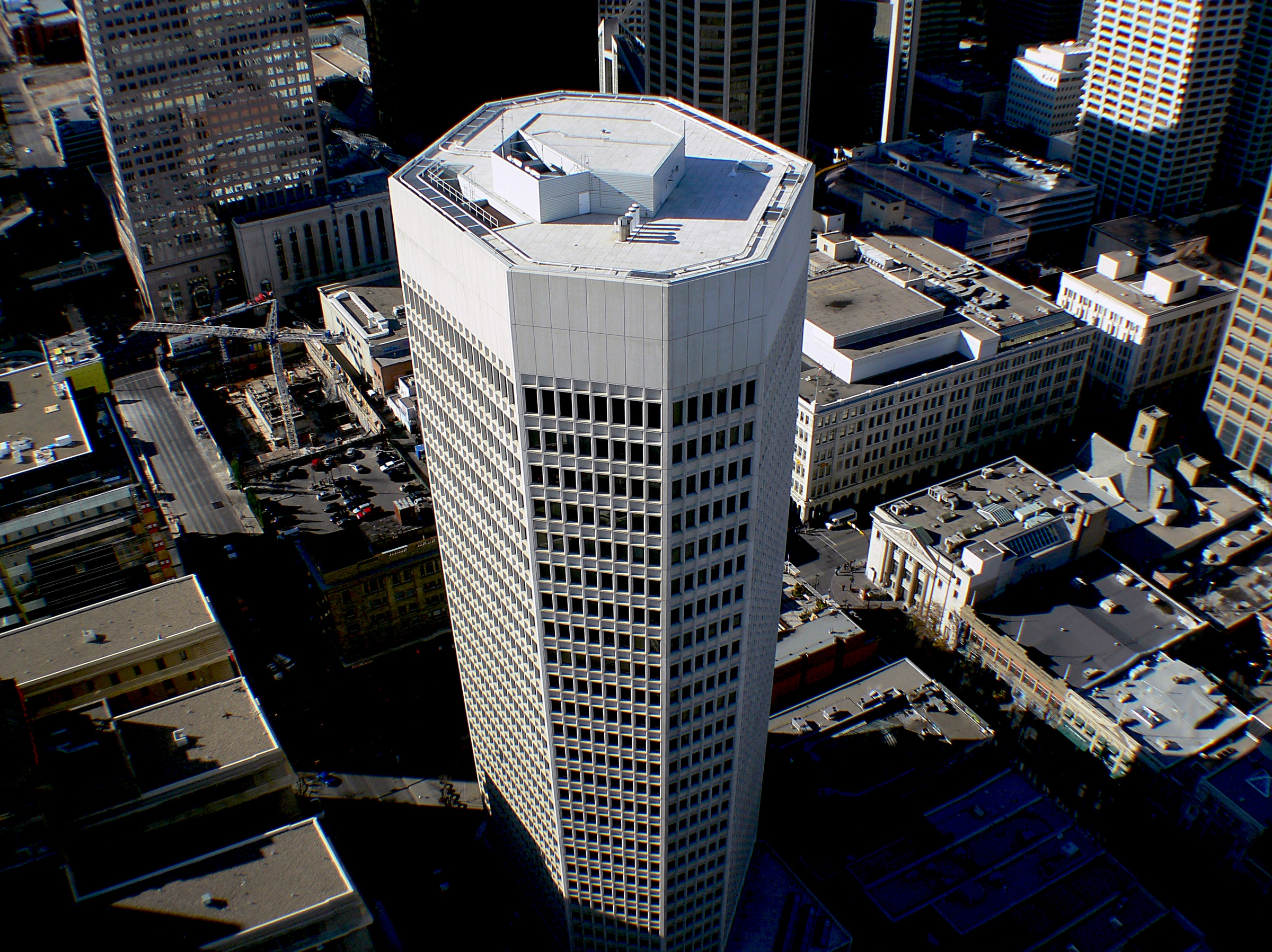
PanCanadian Plaza, the company's headquarters in Calgary, opened in May 1982.

PanCanadian was unique amongst Canadian independent oil companies in that, through its freehold interests, it was under no time constraints to explore (other oil & gas companies typically acquired oil & gas rights from the Alberta crown or other private owners of mineral rights under limited time leases - typically 5 years - that expired if wells were not drilled within specified time periods). Furthermore, it was able to reduce its production royalties by around a quarter through write-offs on its exploration costs. By the late 1970s, the company's annual revenues neared $500 million while its profits stood at around $155 million. PanCanadian was run conservatively, which was a management style inherited from Canadian Pacific. Initially, the company worked out of One Palliser Square, an office tower Canadian Pacific had opened in 1970 on the site of the former Department of Natural Resources Building. In 1978, the company announced the construction of a new 30-storey tower across the street. Named PanCanadian Plaza, the tower was built by Marathon Realty – the real estate arm of Canadian Pacific Investments – and was designed by the Leblond-Koch Partnership. The building opened in May 1982.

During its first decade, PanCanadian was run prudently by Campbell and Taylor. In 1978, PanCanadian took a four percent stake in the new oil sands consortium Syncrude. In 1980, Bartlett Bidwell Rombough (1924–2013) assumed the presidency from Taylor. Despite its excess of supply, Rombough's cautious leadership helped PanCanadian through the 1980s oil glut, during which time the company managed to increase its profits. In 1984, its revenues exceeded $1 billion for the first time. A failed gas exploration programme in northwest Alberta in the late 1980s led to a significant decrease in profits. In 1990, David P. O'Brien was made president, and in 1991 chairman. O'Brien sought to streamline PanCanadian and in so doing sold off its American assets as well as two major subsidiaries. He also increased the company's risk by doubling its investment in exploration. In 1992, the company decreased its staff by 14 percent. During the early 1990s, O'Brien also began several international projects. In Russia, PanCanadian held half interest in a joint project with Samotlor and Canadian Fracmaster. It also participated in projects in Australia, Indonesia, and Libya.

In 1994, O'Brien was appointed president of Canadian Pacific Limited. At this time he ceded the PanCanadian presidency to David A. Tuer while remaining chairman of the board. That same year, PanCanadian wound down its international ventures and focused itself on domestic projects. The following year, it joined Hunt Oil Company in an offshore exploration project in Newfoundland where they drilled an exploration well to 4,600 metres, deeper than anyone had previously attempted.

=== Breakup of Canadian Pacific Limited ===
In 1980, Canadian Pacific Investments was renamed Canadian Pacific Enterprises, and in 1985 it merged into its parent Canadian Pacific Limited. In February 2001, Canadian Pacific Limited announced its intention to break up its holdings. The breakup saw Canadian Pacific Railways, PanCanadian Petroleum, Fording Coal, CP Ships, and Fairmont Hotels spun out into independent companies. The move was motivated by the belief that the companies would be worth more on their own than as parts of a conglomerate. To facilitate the breakup, in August, PanCanadian Petroleum shares were transferred to a new company called PanCanadian Energy Corporation and began trading under this name. On Wednesday, 26 September 2001, shareholders voted 98 percent in favour of breaking up the holding company into its constituent parts. In 2013, author Peter C. Newman assessed the breakup, writing, "the idea was 'to unlock shareholder value,' but in the process the new little duchies lost the protection of the parent empire. Until recently, [Canadian Pacific] has been a basket case, rated as one of the continent’s worst-run railways. The open question remains: what would CPR be worth had O’Brien made it work as a conglomerate, which it had been for much of the preceding 120 years?" Following the breakup, on Sunday, 14 October 2001, president David Tuer announced his resignation abruptly, allegedly after a clash with the board of directors over the company's future direction. Director and former chief financial officer Michael A. Grandin was appointed president immediately.

== Merger with Alberta Energy Company ==
Following the breakup of Canadian Pacific Limited, PanCanadian petroleum became a target for an American takeover. On 16 October 2001, the president of the Alberta Energy Company Limited, Gwyn Morgan, telephoned PanCanadian chairman O'Brien. The telephone call started a series of secretive meetings between the two men to discuss a merger. In late October, O'Brien initiated "Operation Zebra" to create a plan for the companies to merge, or "change their stripes." By Christmas Morgan and O'Brien had settled on the name EnCana for the merged organisation, and on Sunday, 27 January 2002, announced the plan. On Thursday, 4 April 2002, shareholders of both companies voted to approve the merger, and the following Monday EnCana began operation. The merger was worth around $28 billion and immediately made EnCana the world's largest independent petroleum company. At its inception EnCana became Canada's seventh-largest company. The presidency was assumed by Morgan, while O'Brien became its first chairman.

== Leadership ==
=== President ===
1. John McGuire Taylor, 1971–1980
2. Bartlett Bidwell Rombough, 1980–1988
3. Charles Barrie Clark, 1988–1989
4. David Peter O'Brien, 1990–1994
5. David Arnold Tuer, 1994–2001
6. Michael Anthony Grandin, 2001–2002

=== Chairman of the Board ===
1. Robert William Campbell, 1971–1988
2. Bartlett Bidwell Rombough, 1988–1991
3. David Peter O'Brien, 1992–2002
