= Joe B. Foster =

American businessman (1934-2020)

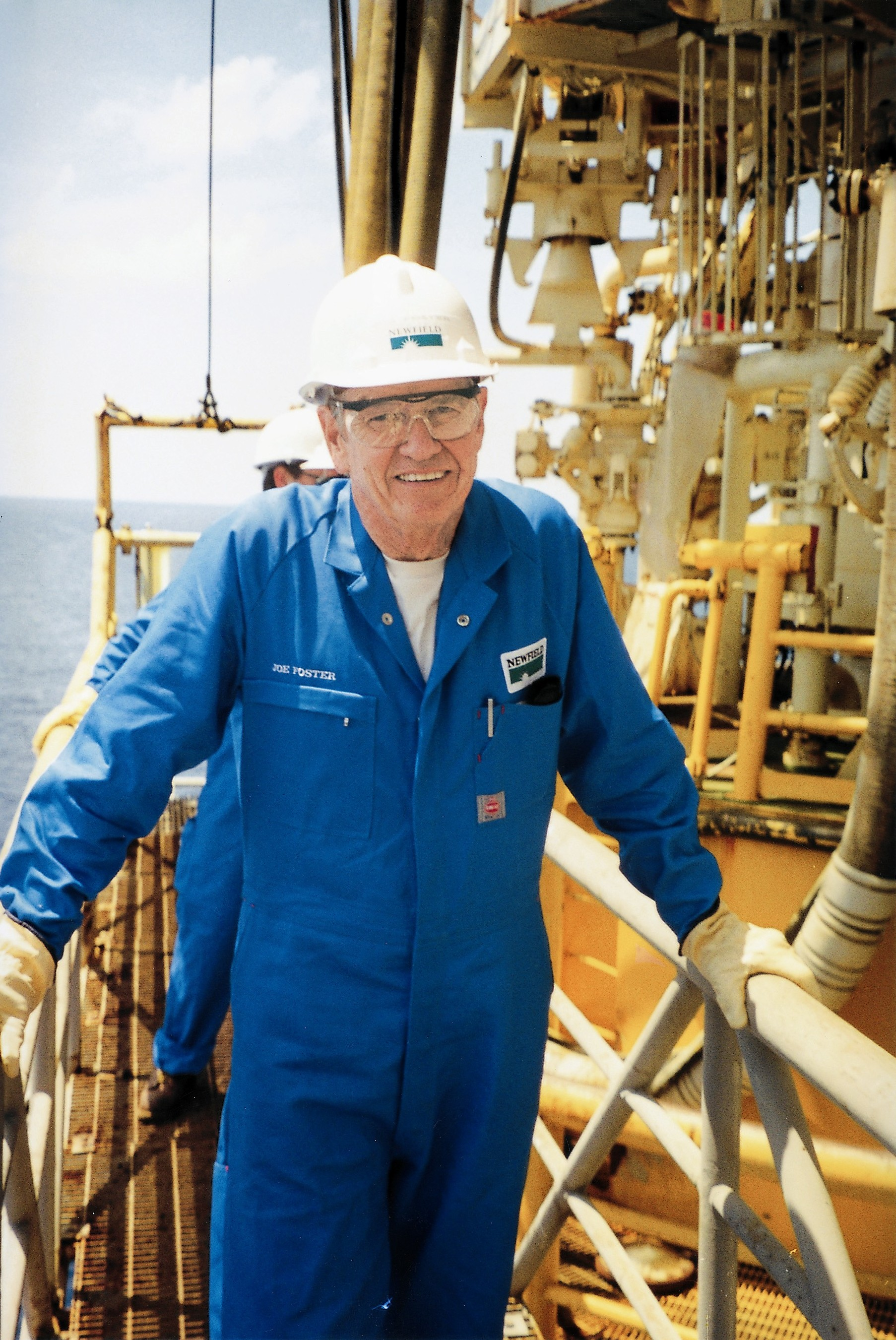
- Foster on an offshore rig, drilling for Newfield Exploration Company in the Timor Sea
- Born: Joe Bill Foster; July 25, 1934; Arp, Texas, U.S.
- Died: May 9, 2020 (aged 85)
- Education: Texas A&M University; (B.B.A. General Business); (B.S. Petroleum Engineering)
- Occupations: Oilman, businessman
- Known for: Founder and CEO, Newfield Exploration (1989–2005); Chairman, Newfield Exploration (2000–2005); Executive VP, Tennecco, Inc. (1983–1988); Chairman, Tennessee Gas 1983–1988; Interim CEO, Baker Hughes, Inc. (2000); Operating Trustee, Texaco Refining and Marketing, Inc. (2001–2002); Chairman, National Petroleum Council (1997–1999); Honoree, Texas Business Hall of Fame (2006)
- Board member of: Baker Hughes; Tennecco, Inc.; New Jersey Resources; J. Ray McDermott & Co.; National Petroleum Council; Houston Museum of Natural Science; YMCA of Greater Houston; Texas A&M University Foundation; Houston A+ Challenge
- Spouses: Harriet Foster (m. 1991) Mary Alice Foster (m. 1957; div. 1990)
- Website: www.newfield.com

Joe B. Foster (July 25, 1934 – May 9, 2020) was an American businessman, oilman and philanthropist from Texas. From 1989 to 2005, Foster was chairman, president, and chief executive officer of Newfield Exploration Company, headquartered in Houston. Previously, Foster was chairman of Tenneco Oil Company and executive vice president and director of its parent, Tenneco Inc. He was with Tenneco for 31 years and also was chairman of the Tenneco Gas Pipeline Group.

Foster was born in Arp, Texas, and attended Texas A&M University. He graduated in 1957 with a bachelor of science degree in petroleum engineering and a bachelor of business administration degree in general business. In May 1997, he was named a distinguished alumnus of Texas A&M University. Foster was chairman of the National Petroleum Council, an industry advisory body to the U.S. Secretary of Energy, and in 1995–1996 was chairman of the Offshore Committee of the Independent Petroleum Association of America. He was a director of Memorial Hermann Hospital System and was chairman of the Houston Museum of Natural Science, the Greater Houston YMCA, and the Texas A&M Development Foundation. He also was on the boards of Baker Hughes Incorporated and New Jersey Resources Corporation. Foster was chairman and a senior advisor at Tudor, Pickering, and Holt 2008–2016.

== Career ==
In addition to his tenures at Newfield and Tenneco, Joe Foster's corporate directorships included Baker Hughes, Inc., McDermott International, Inc., New Jersey Resources Corporation, Valero Energy, Dual Drilling, and Targa Resources, Inc. From February through August 2000, Foster was interim chairman, president and chief executive officer of Baker Hughes Incorporated, while the company searched for a new chief executive. In 2001–2002, Foster was the independent trustee for a large portion of Texaco's refining and marketing assets which were required to be divested in the course of the Chevron–Texaco merger.

=== Tenneco Oil ===
Foster was chairman of Tenneco Oil Company and executive vice president and director of its parent, Tenneco Inc. He began with Tenneco as a junior petroleum engineer in Oklahoma City in 1957. After working in several engineering positions in Lafayette, Louisiana, while Tenneco was establishing its Gulf of Mexico operations, he became chief of planning and economic analysis for Tenneco Oil Exploration and Production in Houston in 1968. He rose through the ranks of Tenneco Oil, becoming its president in 1978. In 1981, he was named to the board of directors of Tenneco Inc. and assumed corporate-level responsibility for all of Tenneco Inc.’s upstream, downstream, and gas pipeline businesses. He left Tenneco when its board elected to divest Tenneco Oil in 1988.

=== Newfield Exploration ===
Joe B. Foster was the founder of Newfield Exploration Company, a Houston-based oil and gas exploration company. He was chief executive officer until his retirement from active management in January 2000, and remained as chairman of its board until May 2005. Foster founded Newfield in 1989 as a private start-up with $9 million of equity capital provided by himself, other employees, a group of Houston investors, and University of Texas Endowment funds. It became a public company in 1993, and its recent market value was about $5 billion.

=== Tudor, Pickering, Holt & Co. ===
Foster was affiliated with the Tudor, Pickering, Holt & Co. investment banking firm, was chairman of its TPH Partners private equity Fund I, and as a senior advisor to its Fund II. In addition, he participated as a non-operating partner in drilling oil and gas wells in the Gulf Coast area.

== Community service ==
He was on several not-for-profit boards of directors, including the Houston Museum of Natural Science, Memorial Hermann Healthcare System, Houston Hospice, and the YMCA of Greater Houston. He also was chairman of Houston A+ Challenge (formerly Houston Annenberg Challenge), an organization directed at improving public schools in the Houston area.

- Chairman, Greater Houston YMCA, 1989–1991
- Chairman, Houston Museum of Natural Science, 1991
- Chairman, Houston A+ Challenge, 2009–2010
- Director, Memorial Hermann Healthcare System, 1999–2006
- Director, Houston Hospice
- Texas A&M Foundation, trustee, 1988–1996; chairman, 1993

== Awards and recognition ==
Foster was named "Entrepreneur of the Year" in Houston's energy sector in 1994 and an "All American Wildcatter" in 1995. In 2004, he was named a Gulf of Mexico "Industry Pioneer" by the Offshore Energy Center in Galveston, Texas, and has been named the Houston World Affairs Council's 2006 Jones International Citizen of the Year.

=== Awards received ===
- Houston Entrepreneur of the Year, Energy Sector, 1994
- Distinguished Alumnus, Texas A&M, 1997
- Spindletop Service Award, 2000
- Mays College of Business, Outstanding Alumnus, 2001
- Joe B. Foster Chair in Business Leadership, Mays Business School, 2004
- Texas Business Hall of Fame, 2006

== Sources ==
- Smith, Arthur L. (2011). Something From Nothing: Joe B. Foster And The People Who Built Newfield Exploration Company. Houston, Texas: Bright Sky Press. p. 216. ISBN 978-1-93397-943-4.
