= Alberta Energy Company =

Canadian petroleum company (1973–2002)

Alberta Energy Company Ltd.
- Traded as: TSX: AEC; NYSE: AOG
- Industry: Petroleum
- Founded: 18 September 1973
- Defunct: 4 April 2002
- Fate: Merged with PanCanadian Petroleum
- Successor: EnCana Corporation
- Headquarters: Calgary, Alberta

The Alberta Energy Company Ltd. was a Canadian independent petroleum company that existed from 1973 to 2002. The AEC was created by the Government of Alberta under Premier Peter Lougheed as a mechanism for Albertans to invest in the Syncrude oil sands project. Besides its participation in Syncrude, the AEC also received the rights to produce gas in the Suffield Block. The company was established as a mixed enterprise and at its inception was half owned by the provincial Crown and half owned by the public. A restrictive charter, which prevented individual shareholders from acquiring more than one percent of the company and mandated directors be residents of Alberta, ensured control remained within the province. Until 1982, the company was barred from participation in conventional oil and gas exploration, but after that time was given the right to compete with private companies in that area. In 1983 the government began to decrease its equity, and in 1993 divested of its remaining shares.

The AEC grew to become a global oil and gas producer and a highly profitable company. After Canadian Pacific Limited divested of PanCanadian Petroleum in the fall of 2001, AEC president Gwyn Morgan and PanCanadian chairman David P. O'Brien began negotiations for a merger. In April 2002 the two companies merged to create EnCana Corporation, which became the world's largest independent petroleum company.

== History ==
=== Formation of the company, 1973–1974 ===
The Alberta Energy Company originated in the Syncrude project. In 1957, Cities Service Oil Company of Bartlesville, Oklahoma established a Canadian subsidiary, Cities Service Athabasca Inc., to produce heavy oil in the Athabasca oil sands. The company opened a test plant at Mildred Lake and began strip mining bitumen. In the early 1960s, Cities Athabasca partnered with Imperial Oil, Royalite Oil, and Richfield Oil and submitted a bid to the Alberta government to construct an extraction plant. However, the government rejected the bids by Cities and Shell and instead approved the Great Canadian Oil Sands proposal. After the rejection, on 4 December 1964, the Cities group joined to form Syncrude Canada Ltd., whose first president was Frank Keller Spragins (1914–1978) of Imperial.

The Syncrude group later resubmitted an application to build a plant, and in 1969 the proposal was approved by the government. By this time, Richfield had become Atlantic Richfield and Royalite had merged with British-American Oil to form Gulf Oil Canada. Over the next two years the project proceeded slowly. In the 1971 Alberta general election, the Progressive Conservative Association of Alberta, led by Peter Lougheed, won a majority of seats. The victory unseated the Social Credit Party, which had been in power since 1935. Whereas Social Credit had participated in the oil industry passively by collecting royalty payments from leases, Lougheed's Conservatives intended to invest and participate actively in the industry. One of the Lougheed government's first actions was to suspend construction of the Syncrude plant and to have his government draft a new policy on oil sands development.

In August 1973, the government met with representatives from Syncrude and its four partners to discuss the terms under which the government would allow the project to proceed. The first meeting, between company vice-presidents and cabinet ministers was led by Don Getty, and ended with the government group walking out. The second meeting was between Lougheed and the five company presidents: Spragins of Syncrude, Jerry McAfee of Gulf, Jack Armstrong of Imperial, Gordon Sellars of Cities, and Robert Anderson of Atlantic Richfield. Lougheed's terms for the project were:

1. The Alberta government would collect 50 percent of Syncrude's profits, and
2. A new corporation, the Alberta Energy Company, would:
  - hold the option to acquire a 20 percent stake in Syncrude after operations had begun,
  - own 50 percent of the Alberta Oil Sands Pipeline, and
  - own 80 percent of the power plant for the proposed facility.

The new corporation, the Alberta Energy Company, would be owned 50 percent by the provincial government and 50 percent by the public. The Syncrude group agreed grudgingly to the terms, and on Tuesday, 18 September 1973, the government incorporated the Alberta Energy Company. The following day, Lougheed gave a province-wide television address to announce the plan. Over the following months, the government revealed the full plan for the AEC. To increase the viability of the company, the province would sell it the natural gas reserves in the Suffield Block, which hitherto had been off-limits for petroleum exploration. The Suffield sale was especially complicated, as the province owned the mineral rights, while the federal government owned the surface rights and leased the land to the British Army for use as CFB Suffield. The AEC purchased the rights for $54 million, which the private sector argued was below value. Further, the AEC had to ensure exploration and production was farmed out to private industry.

After the announcement of the plan, Alberta New Democratic Party leader Grant Notley inveighed the proposal for what he believed was its failure to keep the profits from the oil sands in the hands of Albertans. Notley reiterated that even if the AEC acquired the full 20 percent stake in Syncrude, only 10 percent would actually belong to the Albertan public, while 80 percent of the profits would go to the four American-controlled companies that made up the rest of the consortium. At a conference at the University of Calgary held by the Committee on Socialist Studies, Notley called the project "the most gigantic sellout in the history of Canada" and told the audience that, were he premier, he would renegotiate the deal. When the legislature reconvened on 10 October, Notley asked Lougheed, "has the government considered the feasibility of developing a totally Canadian-owned plant in the tar sands owned by the Alberta Energy Company in partnership with the Canada Development Corporation?"

On 7 December 1973 in the Alberta Legislature, Don Getty, Minister for Federal and Intergovernmental Affairs, delivered a statement on the AEC. In it he said, "we are convinced that there is a demonstrated need for an energy investment company whose control will always remain in the hands of Albertans. There is also a need to develop the basis for a continuing partnership between Albertans and their government, with the government providing the initial leadership in establishing such a company."

The Alberta Energy Company Act, which established the company, received royal assent on 6 June 1974. As the AEC was created to provide a vehicle for Albertan ownership of the oil industry, the Act included strict provisions to keep control of the company within the province. These included a stipulation that three-quarters of company's directors had to be Alberta residents, and prevented any entity besides the Government of Alberta from owning more than one percent of the company's shares.

The nine directors elected to the first board were Mathew M. Baldwin, Edward A. Galvin, M. Earl Lomas, Peter L. Macdonnell, John E. Maybin, Stanley A. Milner, Raymond J. Nelson, Gordon H. Sissons, and J. Harry Tims. All except Maybin, whose residence was Toronto, lived in Alberta. On 9 October 1974, the board appointed David Edward Mitchell (1926–2010) as the company's first president. Prior to taking the position, Mitchell was president of the Great Plains Development Company of Canada, a subsidiary of Burmah Oil.

Upon his appointment, Mitchell received a letter of understanding from Premier Lougheed that outlined the relationship between the government and the company. In the letter, Lougheed explained that the government would not play a role in the company's operations; neither civil servants nor politicians would be allowed seats on the board; government nominees to the board would be for a minority of seats; the board would retain full control over the appointment of officers; and the company was expected to generate good financial results for its shareholders. Finally, the AEC was forbidden "to engage in exploration in the conventional oil and gas industry in Alberta."

=== Mitchell era, 1975–1993 ===
At the end of 1974, Mitchell resigned the presidency of Great Plains. In January 1975, he assumed his new role with the AEC and the company began operations. The first office was established on the tenth floor of the Aquitaine Tower in Calgary. The company's first annual general meeting took place in June of that year. However, as the government was still the sole shareholder, the meeting was closed.

The AEC was capitalised at $150 million in 15 million shares. The initial share offering was held off for most of the company's first year due to poor overall conditions in the marked. In November 1975, the AEC sold its first offering. The offer comprised 7.5 million shares at $10 per; the government retained its 50 per cent holding. The company gave a two-week priority period from the 7th to 14th during which time only Alberta residents were allowed to purchase, and the sales were done on the Alberta Stock Exchange. At the end of the period, purchasing rights were extended beyond the province and trading began on the Toronto Stock Exchange, Montreal Stock Exchange, and Vancouver Stock Exchange. Initially, Members of the Legislative Assembly of Alberta were forbidden from owning stock in the company. However, on 19 November 1975, the company charter was amended to allow MLAs to acquire stock. By 1979, 18 of 29 cabinet ministers were shareholders in the AEC.

In April 1978, the provincial government sold the AEC production rights to the Primrose Lake block. Similar to Suffield, the province owned the mineral rights while it leased the surface rights to the federal government for use as an air weapons range, part of CFB Cold Lake. The AEC paid $45 per acre for the 1.25 million acres. Private industry again complained about the sale, claiming a fair price was $150 per acre.

In August 1979, the AEC exercised its option to acquire a 20 per cent stake in Syncrude. It made this purchase for $570 million, and became the company's second largest shareholder behind Imperial, which held 25 per cent. However, two weeks after the acquisition, it sold half of its newly acquired stake to a consortium of Petrofina and Hudson's Bay Oil and Gas for $365 million, thus netting an $80 million profit.

After the introduction of the National Energy Program (NEP) on 28 October 1980, the AEC lobbied the Alberta government to remove the restrictions on its exploration and production activities. Company executives argued that its limitations, combined with NEP policies, would force it to leave the province to be able to generate profit. In 1981, Lougheed lifted the proscriptions on the AEC, however, he continued to deny it the right to acquire private companies. In defiance of this order, in June 1982, the AEC purchased for $168 million a majority stake in the Edmonton-based Chieftain Development Ltd. Chieftain had been founded in 1964 by AEC director Stanley A. Milner, who at the time was still the company's president. The acquisition prompted a furor in the province. Despite this, the Lougheed government declined to intervene and claimed ex post facto that the proscription on acquisitions applied only to hostile takeovers. In July 1988, the AEC acquired the remainder of Chieftain stock and merged the latter's operations into its own.

The 1982 Chieftain purchase prompted the AEC to make a share offering, with the aim of raising capital to reduce debt. As the company's charter required the government to maintain a minimum 50 per cent stake in the company, the government would be required to purchase half of the new offering. However, by the 1980s, the government had begun to shift its position on state participation in the economy. Following the 1982 Alberta general election in November, in early December, the government announced it would not purchase its half of the forthcoming offering. To allow the government holding in the company to drop below 50 per cent, the act establishing the AEC had to be amended. On 6 June 1983, the original act was changed to allow the province to dispose of shares as approved.

By 1993, the Government of Alberta's equity in the AEC had dropped to 36 per cent. In April of the year, Provincial Treasurer Jim Dinning announced the government would sell its holdings in the company. The expected profit of $274 million would be used to help pay down the $19.8 billion provincial debt. In response to the decision, NDP leader Ray Martin described the move as "like mortgaging your house to pay off your credit cards." Premier Ralph Klein denied that the move was to help improve the province's financial position in advance of the 1993 Alberta general election held on 15 June. On 14 October, legislation passed to repeal the Alberta Energy Company Act.

=== Morgan era, 1994–2002 ===
In November 1993, David Mitchell announced that he would retire from the presidency at the end of the year. Upon his retirement, he would remain a director and would be appointed chairman of the board. Mitchell's replacement was Gwyn Morgan, an engineer who had joined the AEC in October 1975. At the time of his appointment, Morgan was a senior vice-president of the company. Mitchell's departure coincided with end of government participation in the company, and Morgan would lead the company in its new fully-public configuration.

During 1995, the company drilled 235 new wells with an 84 per cent success rate. That year, oil production increased 36 percent while total liquids production increased 15 percent. In December 1995, the AEC put out an offer to acquire all shares of Conwest Exploration Company Ltd. The acquisition, worth $1.1 billion, was the largest in the company's history, and when completed on 10 January 1996, made the AEC the second largest independent petroleum company in Canada. After the deal was completed, Morgan reorganised the company into three separate regional divisions.

The AEC became a global producer in the late 1990s. In 1999, it acquired Pacalta Resources Ltd. and began exploration work in the Oriente Basin in Ecuador. The company also formed an agreement in February 2001 with the government of Ecuador to build a 450,000-barrels-per-day export pipeline. In 2000 it engaged in exploration activities in the Arctic, off the west coast of Africa, the northwest coast of Australia, and in the Caspian Sea off Azerbaijan. The company also had interests in the Alaska Foothills, Alaska North Slope, and MacKenzie Delta.

=== Merger with PanCanadian Petroleum, 2000–2002 ===
The genesis of the Alberta Energy Company's merger with PanCanadian Petroleum was the decision in the fall of 2000 by Canadian Pacific Limited to break up its holdings. The confidential plan, named "Operation Drummond," was approved by the company's president and chairman David P. O'Brien. Consequently, CPL's 87 per cent equity in PanCanadian would be sold off. On 13 February 2001, O'Brien announced the plan to the public. On Wednesday, 26 September 2001, shareholders of Canadian Pacific and PanCanadian voted in favor of the breakup.

PanCanadian's new independence from Canadian Pacific left it vulnerable to an American takeover. On Tuesday, 16 October 2001, Morgan placed a telephone call to O'Brien, who remained PanCanadian's chairman after the breakup, and opened negotiations for a merger. The plan, called "Operation Zebra," would see the two companies come together to form a massive independent, invulnerable to takeover. On Sunday, 27 January 2002, Morgan and O'Brien held a press conference to announce the plan. The new merged company would be called EnCana Corporation, a name Morgan conceived while cross-country skiing with his wife over Christmas. Both companies held votes on the merger on 4 April; PanCanadian shareholders voted 82 percent in favor, while AEC shareholders voted 91 per cent in favor. The following day, EnCana Corporation came into existence.

Upon the creation of the new company, Morgan assumed the presidency while O'Brien was elected chairman of the board. The executive ranks drew mostly from the AEC. By the fall of 2005, EnCana had become the largest company in the country by market capitalisation. Morgan stepped down from the presidency at the end of 2005, while O'Brien remained chairman until 2013. In early 2020, Encana was renamed Ovintiv and relocated to the United States.

== Leadership ==
=== President ===
1. David Edward Mitchell, 1 January 1975 – 31 December 1993
2. Gwyn Morgan, 1 January 1994 – 4 April 2002

=== Chairman of the Board ===
1. David Edward Mitchell, 1 January 1994 – 21 April 1999
2. Stanley Albert Milner, 21 April 1999 – 4 April 2002
