= Deep Panuke =

Offshore natural gas field in Canada

Coordinates: 43.00°N 61.49°W

Deep Panuke is an offshore natural gas field. It is located 250 km off the coast of Nova Scotia, Canada on the Scotian Shelf. Deep Panuke was owned and operated by SBM Offshore on behalf of Encana, with natural gas production underway beginning in late 2013. Peak monthly production was 248 million cubic meters from four subsea wells in January 2014. Production was reduced to seasonal (winter months only) in the fall of 2015, with monthly production declining to 79 million cubic metres by February 2016.

The field was permanently shut down in 2018.
