= David P. O'Brien =

Canadian businessman

- Born: 9 September 1941 (age 84); Montreal, Quebec
- Education: Loyola College (BA '62); McGill University (BCL '65)
- Spouse: Gail Baxter Corneil (m. 1968)

David Peter O'Brien OC (born 9 September 1941) is a Canadian lawyer and company director. An Irish Quebecer, O'Brien was born and educated in Montreal, and began his career in 1967 with the law firm Ogilvy Renault. In 1977 he moved to Calgary and was appointed general counsel of Petro-Canada, with whom he remained until 1989. In 1990 was appointed president of Pan-Canadian Petroleum, and in 1992 he was elected chairman. He ceded the presidency in 1994 to become president of its holding company, Canadian Pacific Limited, and in 1995 was also elected as chairman.

O'Brien is best known for overseeing the breakup of Canadian Pacific Limited into independent companies, which was completed in September 2001. In 2002, still chairman of PanCanadian, he merged that company with the Alberta Energy Company to create EnCana, the world's largest independent petroleum company at the time. Subsequently he served as EnCana's chairman from 2002 to 2013.

From 2004 to 2013, he was chairman of the Royal Bank of Canada. O'Brien has held directorships with several other major Canadian corporations, including Molson, Air Canada, TransCanada Pipelines, and Vale.

== Education and Career ==
O'Brien obtained a Bachelor of Arts with Honours in Economics from Concordia University and a Bachelor of Civil Law (1965) from McGill University. At McGill he was selected as the Articles Editor for the McGill Law Journal.

In addition to his current role as chairman of Royal Bank of Canada, O'Brien is a board member at Enerplus, Range Royalty, and Spur Resources and has previously served as a director at Molson Coors Brewing Company, TransCanada Corporation, Fairmont Hotels and Resorts, Inco Limited and the C. D. Howe Institute.

From 1995 to 2002, he was President and CEO of Canadian Pacific Railways Limited.

In May 2004, O’Brien was inducted into the Canadian Business Hall of Fame.

In 2005, he endowed the O'Brien Fellowships in the Centre for Human Rights and Legal Pluralism at McGill University's Faculty of Law.

He also served as the chancellor of Concordia University in Montreal, Quebec, from January 1, 2006 to December 31, 2010.

In January 2009, O'Brien was named an officer of the Order of Canada "for his contributions as a respected corporate leader, and his support for post-secondary education across Canada".

In May 2025, he was awarded an Honorary Doctorate from McGill University.
