= Sudeten Provincial Park =

Former provincial park in British Columbia, Canada

Coordinates: 55.5406°N 120.0692°W

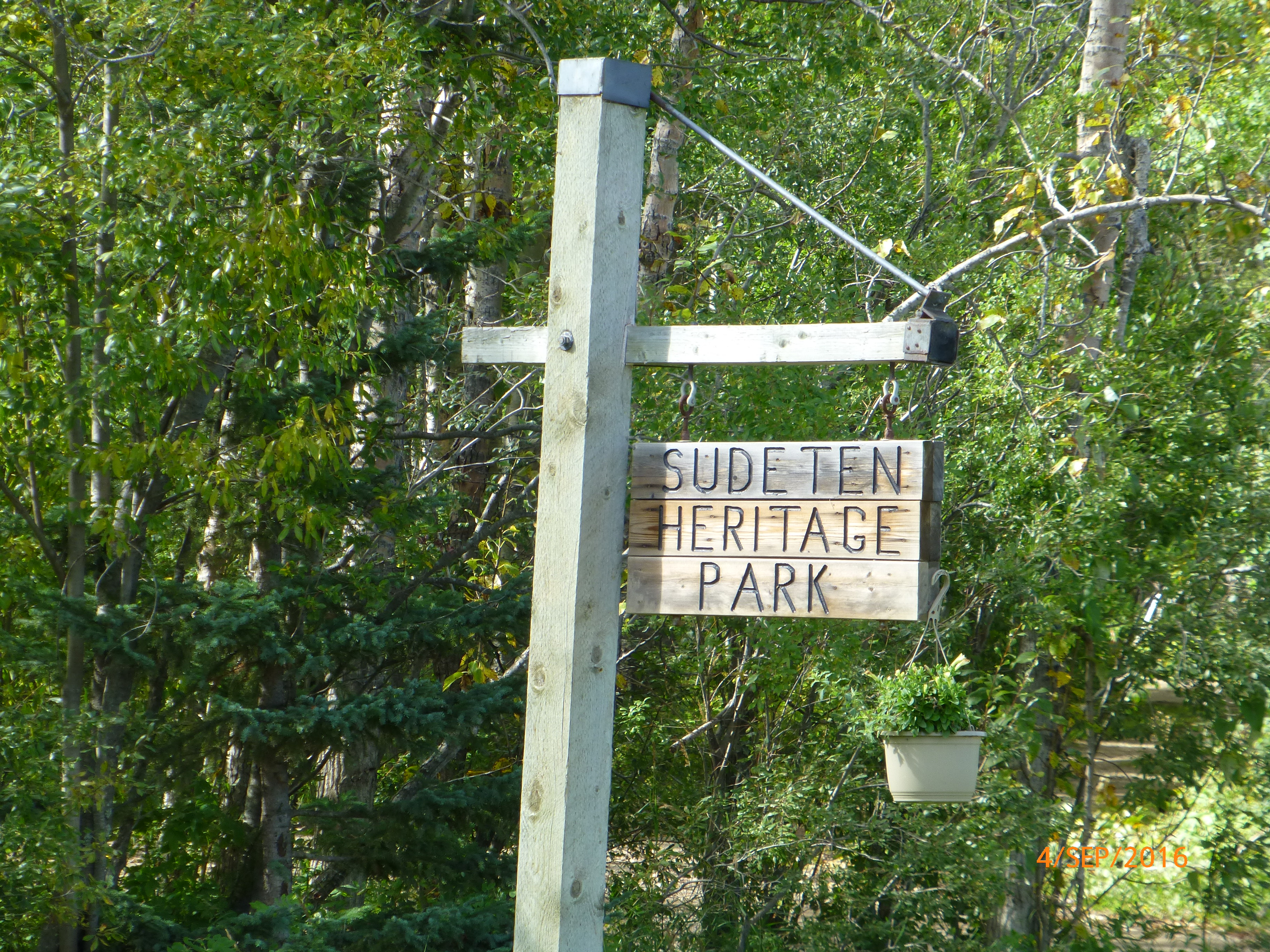
Entrance of the Sudeten Heritage Park

Sudeten Provincial Park is a former provincial park in British Columbia, Canada. Ownership of the five-hectare park was transferred from the provincial government to local government for park purposes in 2006. It is now known as Sudeten Heritage Park and operated by Tomslake & District Recreation Commission.

== Historical significance ==
Sudetenland is the historical German name given to certain border regions of the former Czechoslovakia that were inhabited primarily by Sudeten Germans. In 1939, following the Munich Agreement which assigned the Sudetenland to Nazi Germany, Canada announced it would permit approximately 3,000 Sudeten German (notably Jewish and Socialist) refugees entry to become farmers. Of the 1000 refugees who settled in Canada, half were settled in the Tomslake region of northern British Columbia and the rest in Saskatchewan To commemorate these hardy settlers, many of whom had no experience farming, who fled persecution in their homeland, this park was established.
