= Doug Suttles =

American businessman (born 1960)

Douglas James Suttles (born 1960) is the former president and chief executive officer of Ovintiv Corporation. After graduating from the University of Texas at Austin in 1983 with a BSc in mechanical engineering, he joined the global oil and gas industry. He retired from Ovintiv on August 1, 2021.

== Biography ==
Suttles was with Exxon in Oklahoma and Texas, prior to joining BP, where he initially spent eight years in Alaska in various engineering and leadership roles. Suttles then became Vice President for Northern North Sea operations, and was then appointed President of BP's Trinidadian oil business. Suttles was then named President of BP Sakhalin Inc. (which later merged with TNK-BP), where he was responsible for BP's activities in Sakhalin, Russia, and its joint venture with Russian oil company Rosneft.

Suttles was named president of BP Exploration (Alaska) Inc., effective January 1, 2007. At the same time he also joined the board of BP America, and the BP America Operations Advisory Board. Suttles was 1st Vice President and board member for The Alaska Oil and Gas Association. Suttles was named COO BP Exploration and Production, effective January 2009, based in Houston, Texas.

In 2010, Suttles led BP's reaction to the Deepwater Horizon oil spill.

Suttles is a 2008 recipient of the University of Texas at Austin Mechanical Engineering Academy of Distinguished Alumni Distinguished Mechanical Engineer Award. He acts as a mentor for undergraduates from the University of Texas and the Cockrell School of Engineering.

He served on the boards of The Anchorage Museum Association, The Foraker Group and the Nature Conservancy. He supports charitable organizations including the Texas 4000, BP's United Way campaign and Polar Bear Plunge for cancer.

In January 2011, BP announced Doug's retirement from his role at the company.

On June 11, 2013, Suttles was appointed President & CEO of Encana Corporation, a large Canadian energy producer. Some five years later, in March 2018, Suttles moved from Canada to Denver, Colorado, working out of the company's Denver office.

In 2018, as CEO, Suttles placed second out of 100 of the top earners in Calgary with a total compensation of $15,532,728, according to a Global Governance Advisors' survey posted by The Calgary Herald.
