= Tuscaloosa Marine Shale =

Geologic formation in the United States

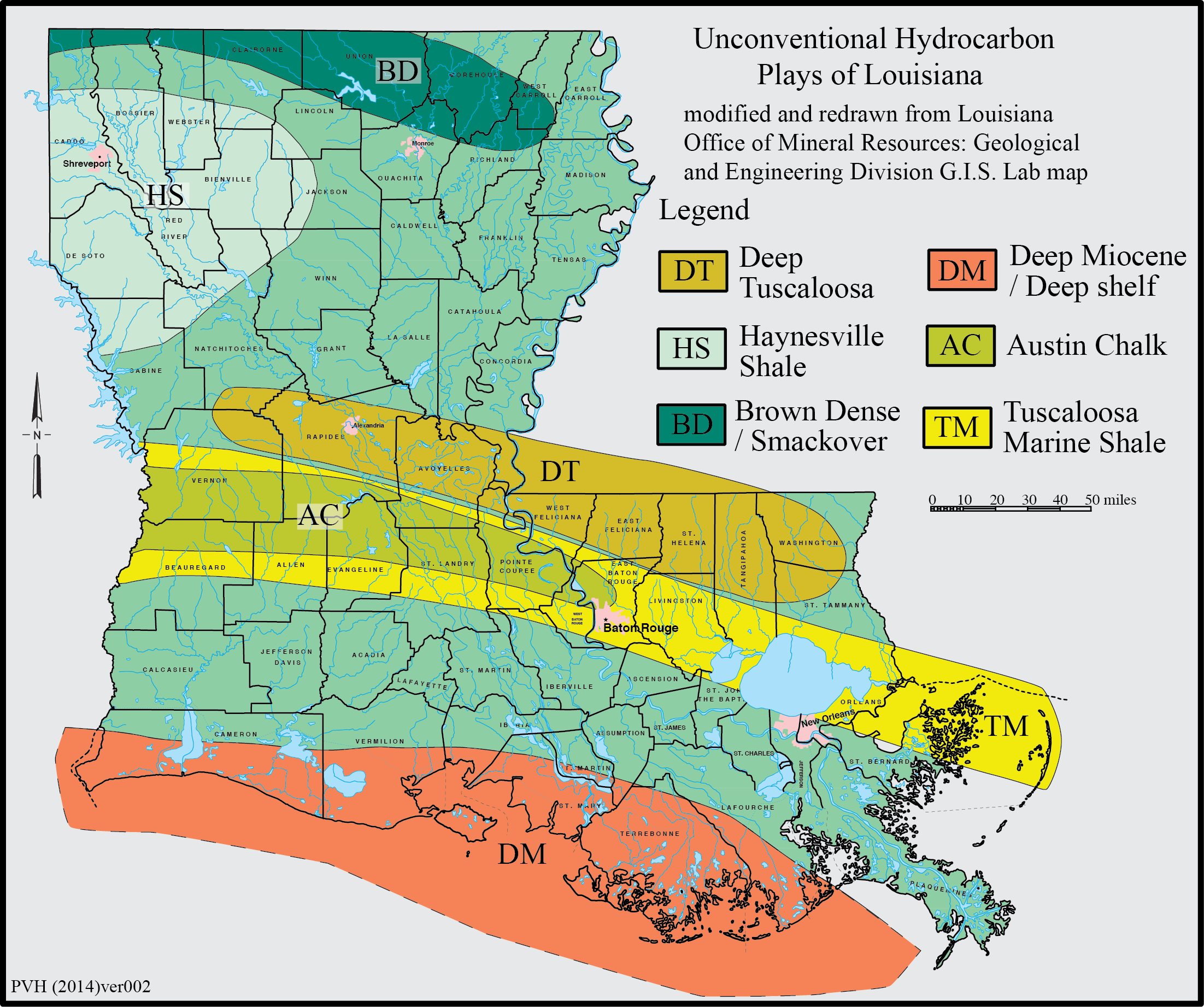
Geological map including the Tuscaloosa Marine Shale

The Tuscaloosa Marine Shale is a 90-million-year-old Late Cretaceous sedimentary rock formation across the Gulf Coast region of the United States.

It is similar in composition and geological age to the Eagle Ford Shale formation in southern Texas.

The thickness of the formation varies from 500–800 feet, and is located at a depth of 11,000-15,000 feet.

== Petroleum ==
The formation is an unconventional oil reservoir, meaning that a majority of the petroleum hydrocarbons (crude oil and natural gas) originating in the source rock formations have not migrated out of the source rock, requiring advanced horizontal drilling and hydraulic fracturing (fracking) technologies to reach economic viability for extraction. The potential reserve is currently estimated at 7 billion barrels of oil.
