= Gwyn Morgan =

Canadian businessman

Gwyn Morgan CM
- Born: 4 November 1945 (age 80); Carstairs, Alberta
- Education: University of Alberta (B.Sc 1967)
- Spouse: Patricia Trottier

Gwyn Morgan CM (born 4 November 1945) is a Canadian retired engineer and oilman. Morgan joined the Alberta Energy Company in 1975, and in 1994 succeeded David E. Mitchell to become the company's second president. In 2002, Morgan negotiated the AEC's merger with PanCanadian Petroleum to create EnCana Corporation. Morgan served as the company's first president before stepping down on 31 December 2005. Additionally, from 2007 to 2013 he served as the chairman of SNC-Lavalin.

== Biography ==
=== Early life ===
Gwyn Morgan was born on 4 November 1945 to Ieuan (Ian) Morgan (1915–1992) and Margaret Hergenhein (1917–1987). Ieuan was born in Abercynon, Wales, and later settled with his family on a farm near Carstairs, Alberta. Ian served in World War II, and after two brothers, Matthew and Gwynfryn (1922–1944), were both killed, he was given an early discharge. Ian and Margaret had four children: Sheila, Betty, and Glenys, and Gwyn. Gwyn Morgan was named after his late uncle.

Gwyn was raised on the family farm and began working at a young age. In 1961, Ian became ill and the Morgan family moved to Calgary for him to receive treatment. After high school, Morgan was accepted into the engineering programme at the University of Alberta, and enrolled in the petroleum options. He graduated in 1967.

=== Career ===
Morgan's first job after university was with the Alberta Oil and Gas Conservation Board as a reservoir engineer. In 1969, he joined the Canadian subsidiary of the Northern Natural Gas Company and by 1973 had become its manager of operations and engineering.

In October 1975, Morgan joined the Alberta Energy Company. The company had been founded by the Government of Alberta in September 1973, and had begun operating in January 1975.

By 1998, he was mentioned in Peter C. Newman's publication, Titans: How the New Canadian Establishment Seized Power, about "the new Canadian establishment", as a "promising comer to watch." By 2003, Morgan was described in a Maclean's magazine profile as "the most powerful man in Canada's oil patch."

Morgan founded EnCana Corporation and served as its President and Chief Executive Officer from April 2002 to December 31, 2005 and as Executive Vice Chairman from December 2005 to October 12, 2006. When Alberta Energy Corporation merged with PanCanadian Petroleum Ltd in 2002 to form EnCana, it was, according to the University of Alberta website, "widely viewed as the most significant transaction in Canadian energy sector history." As President and CEO, in April 2002, Morgan launched EnCana Corporation's operations with former AEC staff as his management team, making the merger of the two companies more like an "AEC takeover", according to The Globe and Mail.

By September 2005, Encana had become the number one company on the Toronto Stock Exchange—the first energy company to do so since 1980. In 2005, Morgan was listed in 9th place out of 25 in the Globe and Mail's "The Power 25", running "the continent's biggest natural gas empire, presiding over a critical commodity that powers the grid". In the wake of Hurricane Katrina, the price of gas had increased to become more valuable than oil. By 2005 when Morgan left EnCana, the company "had become North America’s leading independent oil and natural gas production company, with a stock market value of approximately $60 billion."

Morgan became an Independent Director of SNC-Lavalin Group Inc. on March 4, 2005 and from May 2007 through May 2013, he served as Chairman.

BY 2005, Morgan was director and a Vice-Chairman of the Canadian Council of Chief Executives, now known as the Business Council of Canada (BCC), which includes CEOs of 150 leading Canadian companies.

Along with his service on the Boards of Directors at AEC, Encana, SNC-Lavalin, and the Canadian Council of Chief Executives, over the years Morgan has also served as director at Industry Training Authority, Noblegen Inc., the Institute of the Americas, the Council for Canadian Unity, the Fraser Institute, the Manning Centre, American Petroleum Institute, Accenture Energy Advisory Board, Rio Tinto Alcan (Also known as Alcan Inc.) and Lafarge North America Inc. Morgan served as a director of HSBC Bank Canada from December 1996 to May 2012.

== Awards and honours ==
Morgan was named Canada's Outstanding CEO of the Year in 2005. In 2005, he was named as Fellow of the Canadian Academy of Engineering (FCAE). According to Bloomberg, he is the "recipient of the Canadian Business Leader Award from the University of Alberta and the Ivey Business Leader Award from the University of Western Ontario, two Honorary Degrees and an inductee to the Alberta Business Hall of Fame".

In 2005 he was named as a Fellow of the Canadian Academy of Engineering (FCAE).

=== Public appointment commission controversy ===
In 2006, Morgan was appointed by Prime Minister of Canada Stephen Harper to chair the newly-established Public Appointments Commission. The appointment was rejected by opposition MPs due in part to statements Morgan had made linking refugees with crime in Canada. A May 17, 2006 article in the National Post criticized Morgan's opponents asking, "who but the hopelessly politically correct can deny the malign influence of violent gangs from Jamaica, Sri Lanka and East Asia on street life in Toronto, Vancouver and other Canadian urban centres?" His past role as a supporter and fundraiser for the Conservative Party of Canada was criticized as a possible conflict of interest with the commission's role of eliminating the use of public appointments for partisan patronage purposes.

=== Canadian Air Force ===
Morgan served as an Honorary Colonel of Canadian Air Force's 410 Tactical Fighter Squadron.

== Personal life ==
Morgan is married to Patricia Trottier. They live on Vancouver Island near Victoria, British Columbia. He has one daughter from a previous marriage.
