= GeoSouthern Energy =

Gas exploration and production company

GeoSouthern Energy Corporation
- Type: Privately held company
- Industry: Petroleum industry
- Founded: 1981; 45 years ago
- Founder: George Bishop
- Headquarters: The Woodlands, Texas
- Key people: George Bishop (CEO)
- Products: Petroleum; Natural gas
- Owner: George Bishop

GeoSouthern Energy Corporation is a petroleum and natural gas exploration and production company headquartered in The Woodlands, Texas.

== History ==
In 1981, the company was founded by Chairman George Bishop.

Margaret "Meg" Molleston, joined the company in 2006 and leads the management of GeoSouthern's assets.

In February 2014, the company sold 82,000 acres in the Eagle Ford shale area of Texas to Devon Energy for $6 billion in cash. The assets were owned in a joint venture with a fund of The Blackstone Group.

In August 2015, in partnership with GSO Capital Partners, the company acquired its GEP Haynesville assets in the Haynesville Shale, including 300 wells across 112,000 acres, from Encana for $850 million.

In November 2021, the company sold its Haynesville Shale GEP Haynesville asset, then producing 700 MMcf/d, to Southwestern Energy for $1.85 billion.

== GEP Haynesville II ==
In 2020, Chesapeake Energy Corporation filed for bankruptcy, and as part of its restructuring plan, it decided to sell some of its assets to pay off its debts. One of the assets that Chesapeake sold was its South Mansfield Haynesville shale acreage, comprising 50,000 net mineral acres, which it sold to Williams Companies, Inc in December 2020.

In August 2021, Williams announced an upstream JV with GeoSouthern (GEP Haynesville II) to develop the South Mansfield asset in order to enhance their strategy of connecting the best supplies of affordable, reliable and clean natural gas with growing customer demand.

In May 2023, Alan Armstrong of Williams stated "During the last downturn, particularly in 2020, where we had customers that owed us for expansions and we brought in new operators to develop those...in the Haynesville, GeoSouthern (GEP Haynesville II) has been the operator there and they have done a fantastic job of growing the volumes in the Haynesville for us."
