= Dawson Creek Daily News =

Daily newspaper in British Columbia, Canada

- Type: Daily newspaper
- Format: Broadsheet
- Owner(s): Glacier Media
- Publisher: Dan Przybylski
- Editor: Alison McMeans
- Founded: May 6, 1930, as Peace River Block News
- Language: English
- Headquarters: 901 100th Avenue; Dawson Creek, British Columbia; V1G 1W2
- Circulation: 1,900 Mondays to Thursdays; 2,200 Fridays
- Website: www.DawsonCreekDailyNews.ca

The Dawson Creek Daily News was a daily newspaper serving Dawson Creek and the South Peace River region of northeastern British Columbia, Canada. The paper was founded in 1930 as the Peace River Block News and was owned by Glacier Media between 2006 and 2023.

Later known as the Dawson Creek Mirror, the paper's last edition was published in October of 2023.

== History ==
Charles S. Kitchen, James E. "Cap" Lean and Bill Carruthers produced the first edition of the weekly Peace River Block News in 1930 in Rolla, British Columbia. Half a year later, Dawson Creek became a rail hub and the newspaper relocated there. The Kitchen family continued to run and grow the paper; by 1970 it was printing 5,300 copies per week and employed a staff of 22.

In 1972, Norm Kitchen sold the Peace River Block News to Del Folk and Don Marshall, who increased its frequency to twice per week, Wednesdays and Fridays. Marshall later became the full owner, and remained publisher for a few years after 1976 when he sold the paper to Sterling Newspapers Ltd., a subsidiary of Hollinger Inc., the newspaper conglomerate controlled by Conrad Black.

Sterling converted the paper to full daily publication and upgraded its presses in 1987.

Along with several other small British Columbia dailies, the Peace River Block News was one of the last Hollinger properties to be sold to Vancouver-based Glacier Ventures International, later renamed Glacier Media, in 2006. The next year, Glacier changed the paper's name to Dawson Creek Daily News.

In 2014, the Dawson Creek Daily News merged with the Glacier-owned Alaska Highway News but maintained a weekly presence in the community as the Dawson Creek Mirror.

The two paper's regional manager cited geographical proximity as a reason for the merger. In its final decade, staff counts dwindled to just a mere handful.

In October 2023, a Vancouver-based Glacier media executive announced the paper's closure, blaming online platforms for falling advertising revenues.

The closure of the Dawson Creek Mirror along with its sister paper has left a news desert in the Peace River region, with local governments left with few alternative means of distributing its public notices as required under British Columbia law.

== See also ==
- List of newspapers in Canada
