= Encana =

Canadian petroleum company

Encana Corporation
- Traded as: TSX: ECA
- Industry: Petroleum
- Predecessor: PanCanadian Petroleum; Alberta Energy Company
- Founded: 5 April 2002
- Defunct: 24 January 2020
- Fate: Restructured
- Successor: Ovintiv
- Headquarters: The Bow, Calgary, Alberta

Encana Corporation was a Canadian independent petroleum company that existed from 2002 to 2020. The company, stylised as EnCana until 2010, was created by David P. O'Brien of PanCanadian Petroleum and Gwyn Morgan of the Alberta Energy Company through the merger of their companies. At the time of its creation Encana was the world's largest independent petroleum company by measure of its value, production, and reserves. Morgan ran the company from its inception through the end of 2005. During its early years, Encana established its reputation as Canada's flagship energy company and an icon of Western Canadian business. In September 2005 it became Canada's largest corporation by market capitalisation for a brief time.

At the beginning of 2006, Morgan ceded the presidency to Randall K. Eresman. During the new president's first year, the company's profits were CAD 6.4 billion, which was the largest corporate profit in Canadian history. In 2009 Encana spun off its oil producing operations as Cenovus, thus becoming exclusively a natural gas producer. Eresman resigned abruptly in early 2013 and was replaced by the American Douglas J. Suttles. The new president streamlined the company's operations and shifted its focus to the United States. Suttles also oversaw the company's return to crude oil production via shale plays in the US.

In October 2019, Suttles, who had moved from Calgary to Denver in 2018, announced the company would undergo a corporate restructuring that would see its residency moved to the United States and its name changed to Ovintiv. On 14 January 2020 shareholders voted 90 per cent in favor of the move, and on 24 January the restructuring was completed.

== History of Encana ==
=== Creation of the company ===
In April 2002, PanCanadian Petroleum was spun out of Canadian Pacific Limited. It subsequently merged with Alberta Energy Company to form EnCana. Gwyn Morgan was named president and CEO.

=== Morgan era, 2002–2005 ===
At a press conference on 25 October 2005, Morgan announced that he would retire from the presidency at the end of the year and that his replacement would be chief operating officer Randall K. Eresman. After his retirement, he would remain on the board. Eresman, a native of Medicine Hat, had begun working for the Alberta Energy Company as a summer student in 1978 and had joined it as an employee in 1980 while studying engineering at the University of Wyoming. When EnCana was created in 2002, Eresman was made president of its Onshore North America division, and in 2003 was made executive vice-president and chief operating officer. Morgan declared his trust in Eresman to lead the company, saying, "you don't put your life and your passion behind something unless you know that you have the right kind of person to carry it on."

=== Eresman era, 2006–2013 ===
In 2009, EnCana completed the corporate spin-off of Cenovus Energy, which held its oil business, representing one-third of its total production and reserves, and EnCana Corporation retaining the natural gas business. Investors favoured the split as it gave them the flexibility to choose between investing in oil, gas, or both.

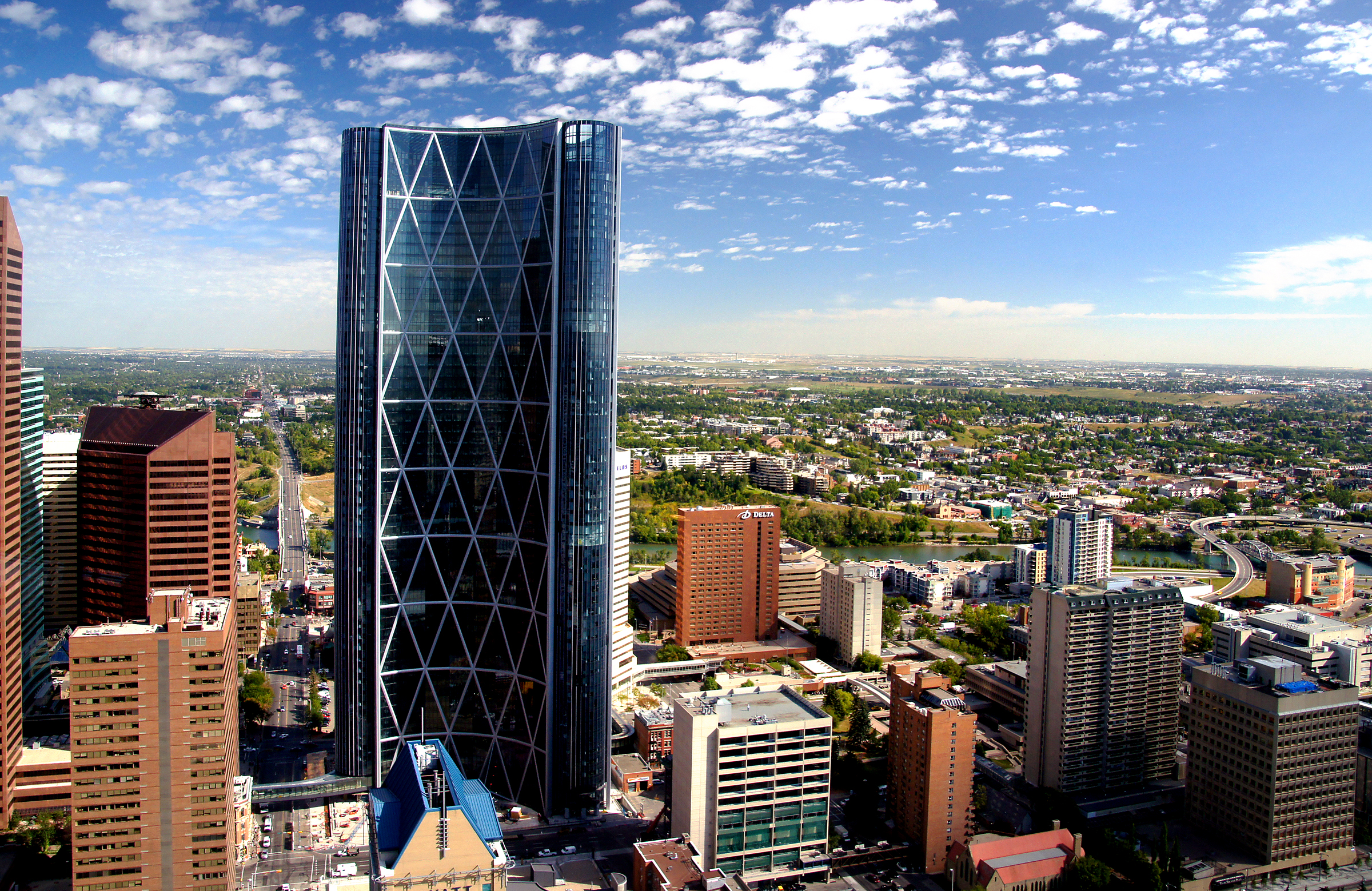
The Bow, Encana's former headquarters in Calgary, opened officially on 4 June 2013

In December 2012, Encana announced a US$2.1 billion joint venture with state-owned, Beijing-based PetroChina through which PetroChina received a 49.9% stake in Encana's Duvernay Formation acreage in Alberta. This was in line with the rules that "favor minority stakes over takeovers" since Prime Minister Stephen Harper's December 7, 2012 prohibition of purchases by state-owned enterprises seeking to invest in Canadian oil. By the end of 2012, Encana's staff had increased to 4,169 employees.

Encana and Cenovus' headquarters, The Bow in Calgary, was completed in 2013, becoming the tallest building in Canada outside of Toronto. The project, owned by H&R REIT, was announced as Encana's headquarters in 2006, prior to the Cenovus split.

On 11 January 2013, Encana announced that Eresman had tendered his resignation. Although he left the presidency, Eresman remained on the board until the end of February. Upon Eresman's resignation, company director Clayton H. Woitas was made interim president and put in charge of the search for a replacement. Eresman's departure from the company was cloaked in secrecy. After the weekend, Woitas told the media that "Randy was getting fatigued." Asked if the board tried to persuade Eresman to stay, Woitas responded that "it was time to move on with a fresh face representing Encana." In an article in the Calgary Herald, two anonymous analysts thought it likely that Eresman had been asked to resign.

=== Suttles era, 2013–2020 ===
In November 2013, the company cut its dividend, announced layoffs of 20% of its employees, closure of its office in Plano, Texas, and plans to sell assets and to found a separate company for its mineral rights and royalty interests across southern Alberta. It planned to invest 75% of its 2014 capital budget into 5 projects: Projects in the Montney Formation and the Duvernay Formation in Alberta, the San Juan Basin in New Mexico, Louisiana's Tuscaloosa Marine Shale, and the Denver-Julesburg Basin (DJ Basin) in northeast Colorado, Wyoming, and Nebraska.

On Thursday, 15 March 2018, Suttles announced to the company's staff that he would be relocating to Denver. He stated the move was for personal reasons. When asked by journalists whether the president's move was an indication the company also would move to the United States, spokesman Simon Scott said "the answer to that is, absolutely not." In November 2018, Encana completed a US$5.5 billion deal to acquire Newfield Exploration of Houston. Before the acquisition, around 60 percent of Encana's production was in Canada; after the acquisition its production became around 60 per cent American. Gwyn Morgan provided a written statement about the deal that read, "I'm deeply saddened that, as a result of the disastrous policies of the Trudeau government, what was once the largest Canadian-headquartered energy producer now sees both its CEO and the core of its asset base located in the U.S." In an editorial he wrote a two weeks later, he said that after stepping down as president in 2005, he "could never have imagined that, a dozen years later, the company would decide to export itself." Meanwhile Ted Morton assessed the purchase, saying, "Encana's announcement that it was acquiring Texas-based Newfield Exploration may be good news for the Calgary-based company, but it is not good news for Canada. It is the most recent chapter in an unfolding story of capital flight from the Canadian energy sector."

== Restructuring as Ovintiv ==
In October 2019, the company announced plans to move its operations from Canada to Denver, where its CEO lived, and change its name to Ovintiv. To complete the restructuring, a new Canadian corporation called Ovintiv (corporation number 1185826-2) was created on 22 January 2020, which acquired all issued shares of Encana in a one-for-one stock swap for Ovintiv shares. On 24 January, Ovintiv was imported to Delaware under the Delaware General Corporation Law, thus concluding the move.

=== Assessments of Encana's demise ===
A month after the announcement, Jeffrey Jones of the Globe and Mail questioned the claim that the company's troubles were caused solely by the federal government, and suggested that, rather, the company had been managed poorly since Suttles became president in 2013. During his tenure, Encana's share price had dropped 75 per cent, while share prices in Canadian Natural Resources had increased 10 percent and in Suncor 24 per cent. He wrote of Suttles, "almost all of his major decisions have made the company more American; unfortunately for investors, none have made them wealthier."

In April 2021, a year after Encana restructured, the Globe and Mail published a lengthy investigation entitled "Who killed Encana?" In the piece, the authors interviewed the company's founders, Morgan and O'Brien, who disagreed with one another on the causes of the company's demise. Morgan laid the blame on the Liberal federal government, which he believed had created a climate hostile to energy investment. He also stated that if Encana had not spun off its oil business into Cenovus, the company "would still be in Canada." O'Brien, on the other hand, said "I don't think the government had anything to do with what happened to Encana, frankly." Rather, he believed the company's difficulties, and its migration to the United States, were the product of the U.S. shale revolution that began around 2008. On the question of the Cenovus split, he said both companies were hit by the revision in prices after 2008, and that "Cenovus has been terrible. Encana has been terrible."

In the years after the company's restructuring, Suttles's compensation came under scrutiny vis-à-vis Encana's performance during his tenure as president. In January 2021, Kimmeridge Energy Management, a private equity firm that owned 2.4 per cent of Ovintiv, released a report on the company's poor performance. During Suttles's tenure, Encana's shareholder returns had been negative 85 per cent, while his compensation had risen from US$6.7 million in 2014 to US$12.6 million in 2019. Through his eight years as head of Encana, the company's shares decreased 58 per cent in value, while he was paid a total of US$104-million. David Milstead said, "it may not be the most colossal mismatch between executive compensation and company performance in Canadian history, but it's a contender." The Financial Post reported that, despite the decline in shareholder equity from US$5.29 billion to $3.84 billion during his presidency, "Suttles was consistently among the highest paid executives in the Canadian oil patch."

== Leadership ==
=== President ===
1. Gwyn Morgan, 5 April 2002 – 31 December 2005
2. Randall Kerry Eresman, 1 January 2006 – 11 January 2013
3. Clayton Harvey Woitas (interim), 11 January 2013 – 11 June 2013
4. Douglas James Suttles, 11 June 2013 – 10 September 2019
5. Michael Gerard McAllister, 10 September 2019 – 24 January 2020

=== Chairman of the Board ===
1. David Peter O'Brien, 5 April 2002 – 24 July 2013
2. Clayton Harvey Woitas, 24 July 2013– 24 January 2020
