= Newfield Exploration =

Former energy company; acquired by Encana

Newfield Exploration Company
- Industry: Petroleum industry
- Founded: 1988; 38 years ago
- Founder: Joe B. Foster
- Defunct: February 13, 2019; 7 years ago
- Fate: Acquired by Encana
- Headquarters: Houston, Texas
- Key people: Lee K. Boothby, Chairman, CEO & President; Gary D. Packer, COO; Lawrence S. Massaro, CFO
- Products: Petroleum; Natural gas Natural gas liquids
- Production output: 152 thousand barrels of oil equivalent (930,000 GJ) per day (2017)
- Revenue: ▲$1.767 billion (2017)
- Net income: ▲$0.427 billion (2017)
- Total assets: ▲$4.961 billion (2017)
- Total equity: ▲$1.408 billion (2017)
- Number of employees: 1,010 (2017)

Newfield Exploration Company was a petroleum, natural gas and natural gas liquids exploration and production company organized in Delaware and headquartered in Houston, Texas. In February 2019, the company was acquired by Encana.

On December 31, 2017, the company had 680 million barrels of oil equivalent (4.2×10^{9} GJ) of estimated proved reserves, of which over 99% was in the United States and 1% was in the South China Sea. The reserves were 37% petroleum, 19% natural gas liquids and 44% natural gas.

The company's properties were as follows:

- Anadarko Basin - approximately 67% of proved reserves and production; 400,000 net acres in SCOOP and STACK plays; 88 thousand barrels of oil equivalent (540,000 GJ) per day of production
- Arkoma Basin - 12% of proved reserves; 147,000 net acres; 16 thousand barrels of oil equivalent (98,000 GJ) per day of production
- Uinta Basin - 13% of proved reserves; 217,000 net acres; 15 thousand barrels of oil equivalent (92,000 GJ) per day of production
- Williston Basin - 10% of proved reserves; 82,000 net acres; 16 thousand barrels of oil equivalent (98,000 GJ) per day of production
- South China Sea - 1% of proved reserves; 5 thousand barrels of oil equivalent (31,000 GJ) per day of production

== History ==
The company was founded in 1988 by the former chairman of Tenneco Oil Company, Joe B. Foster. Through investments by Charles Duncan, Jr., the University of Texas at Austin endowment funds and the founding employees, the company was capitalized with $9 million.

In 1990, Newfield purchased its first production property, Eugene Island Block 172 in the Gulf of Mexico. Production of Eugene Island 172 increased from 0.2 million cubic feet per day (5,700 m^{3}/d) to over 20 million cubic feet per day (570,000 m^{3}/d) by the end of the year.

In November 1993, Newfield became a public company via an initial public offering of 3.125 million shares of common stock. In 1999, the company acquired Gulf Australia Resources Limited, which had assets in the Timor Sea, offshore from northern Australia.

In 2000, the company acquired assets in south Texas for $142 million. In 2001, it acquired Lariat Petroleum in a $333 million transaction, establishing a new focus area in the Anadarko Basin of Oklahoma. In 2002, it acquired EEX Corporation and its asset base in South Texas in a $640 million transaction.

In 2004, Newfield began operations in the Rocky Mountains with the acquisition of Inland Resources.

In 2005, Newfield explored the South China Sea in a partnership with CNOOC.

In 2007, Newfield announced the $575 million acquisition of exploration and development areas in the Rocky Mountains from Stone Energy. In 2007, the company sold its assets in the North Sea for $486.4 million.

In 2009, along with Hess Corporation, the company leased land in Pennsylvania in the Marcellus Formation, but the company pulled out of those leases in 2013.

In 2012, the company sold its remaining assets in the Gulf of Mexico to W&T Offshore. In 2014, it sold its assets in Malaysia to SapuraKencana Petroleum Berhad for $896 million.

In 2016, the company acquired 42,000 acres in the STACK formation of the Anadarko Basin from Chesapeake Energy for $470 million and sold its assets in Texas for $390 million.

In February 2019, the company was acquired by Encana.

== Controversies ==
=== Environmental record ===
In early 2012, Newfield discovered potential violations of the Clean Water Act relating to possible unpermitted discharges of fill materials into certain wetlands and drainages in the Uinta Basin. In 2015, the company resolved these issues with the Environmental Protection Agency and paid a fine of $175,000.
