= George Bishop (businessman) =

American businessman

- Born: 1937 (age 88–89); Smith County, Mississippi
- Occupations: Founder and CEO, GeoSouthern Energy
- Spouse: Married

George H. Bishop (born 1937) is an American billionaire businessman. He is the founder and chief executive officer of GeoSouthern Energy, a petroleum and natural gas exploration company. In 2017, he was ranked #324 on the Forbes 400 list of the richest Americans and was ranked #814 on the list of the world's billionaires with a net worth of US$2.5 billion.

== Early life and education ==
Bishop was born in 1937.

He graduated from Mississippi State University in 1958 with a degree in petroleum geology.

== Career ==
Bishop founded GeoSouthern Energy, an oil company and serves as its chief executive officer.

Bishop is also the owner of the Eagleford Restaurant in Cuero, Texas, where he has a ranch, and is an owner of the River Ridge Golf Club to the west of Houston.

== Political activity ==
Bishop contributed $250,000 to Donald Trump's 2020 presidential campaign.

== Personal life ==
Bishop is married and resides in The Woodlands, Texas.
