= Texas 4000 for Cancer =

Texas 4000

Texas 4000 for Cancer or Texas 4000 is a 501(c)(3) federally registered non-profit organization, and the World's Longest Annual Charity Bike Ride. Each year a new group of 60 to 100 University of Texas at Austin students make a 70-day, 4,687-mile bike trek from the Texas campus in Austin, Texas to Anchorage, Alaska. Each rider meets training and community service expectations and a $4,500 fundraising goal that goes toward Texas 4000's mission of Hope, Knowledge and Charity from Austin to Anchorage. To date, Texas 4000 has raised over $5 million for distribution to various cancer-related organizations including LIVESTRONG, The University of Texas Department of Biomedical Engineering, M.D. Anderson Cancer Center, Brent's Place, and American Cancer Society.

== History ==
Texas 4000 was founded by Chris Condit in 2004, then a student at UT Austin, as a student organization inspired by riders of the Hopkins 4K (4K for Cancer, Inc.). Diagnosed at age 11, Condit himself is a Hodgkin's lymphoma survivor. He conceived Texas 4000 as a way to continue the fight against cancer. In 2004, co-founders Mandy Creecy, Abram Grae, Dan Obenour, Carly Sturdivant, Brandon Magsamen and Adriano Vieira worked with Condit to create the route, volunteer model and overall structure that has been continued by University of Texas student leaders and an increasingly large team of supporters and volunteers.

== Routes ==
The trip takes three routes:

- Rockies
- Sierra
- Ozarks

The Sierra route heads west across west Texas, New Mexico, Arizona, southern Colorado, Utah, Nevada, and California. Riders then travel north through Oregon, Washington, British Columbia, and The Yukon Territory.

The Rockies route heads north to Oklahoma and northwest through Colorado, Wyoming, Montana, and Alberta. British Columbia, and The Yukon Territory.

Previously, riders separated into two routes- Rockies and Sierra- but a new route –Ozarks- was created to celebrate the organization's 10th anniversary. Major cities on the route include College Station, Houston, Little Rock, St. Louis, Chicago, Milwaukee, Madison, Minneapolis, Winnipeg, and Edmonton.

The routes separate after Day 1 and converge in Whitehorse, Yukon on Day 60. The last 10 days are ridden west to Anchorage together.

== Day-to-Day ==
Cycling

During the 70-day journey, the riders average around 80 miles per day on the bike. Some days, the distance is as low as 30 miles, and some days, the riders cover as many as 120 miles. The ride is self-supported, as each route is accompanied by vehicles and a trailer to carry the necessary equipment, food, and bikes when conditions are too hazardous to bike through. Every 7 or 8 days, each rider will take on "SAG" duty and drive a vehicle that day in lieu of biking. This is an opportunity for the rider to rest their muscles and provide invaluable team support by maintaining the safety and health of those biking that day. In the event of an injury, the rider will be a passenger in the SAG vehicle until they are in a condition to return to the bike.

All riders take a "rest day" every 7 – 10 days during the summer to let their bodies rest, visit charitable organizations they support, and engage with the donors and hosts assist their journey possible.

Lodging

The team utilizes various accommodations such as homes, churches, schools, community centers, and other facilities opened up to them by their supporters. During the summer, the group also incorporates camping for around 20 days on average during the summer.

Food

The team strives to have 100% of their food needs met by donations as well. They seek out food donations from grocery stores, restaurants, and individuals, often deferring nearly all of their food costs and, therefore, can contribute that money to grantmaking instead. In 2015, the Sierra and Rockies routes received 100% of their food requirements via donation while on the road.

== ATLAS Ride ==
In 2005, the ride organizers conceived the ATLAS ride as an additional event and fundraiser. Each year, the community is invited to join the Texas 4000 cyclists for the first day's ride from Cedar Park, TX, to Lampasas, TX. The ATLAS event grew to several hundred participants who ride 25-, 50- and 70-mile routes.
