= Tomslake =

- unincorporated settlement
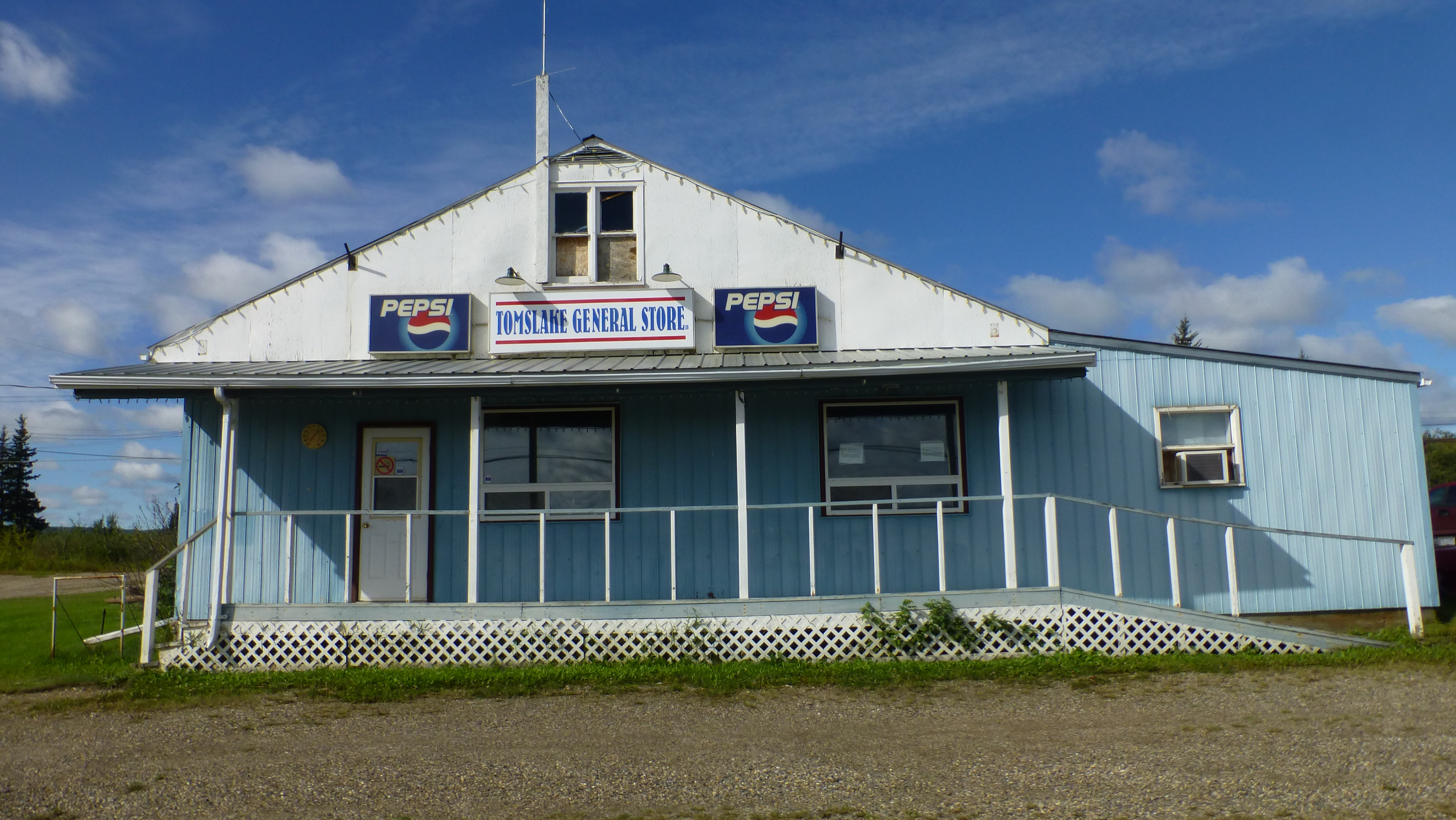

- Location of Tomslake in British Columbia
- Coordinates: 55.5496°N 120.0787°W
- Country: Canada
- Province: British Columbia
- Established: 1939

Tomslake is an unincorporated settlement in British Columbia.

It is located in the Peace River Country, immediately west of the Alberta border, along Highway 2, south from Pouce Coupe, on the north side of Tate Creek, to the northwest of Swan Lake. The community was established in 1939 by a group of refugees (Sudeten Germans) from the Sudetenland of Czechoslovakia. Most of the settlers came from the Sudetenland.

Sudeten Heritage Park and Swan Lake Provincial Park are located south of the settlement. The eponymous Toms Lake is located slightly north of the settlement.

== In popular culture ==
In the mystery novel A Sorrowful Sanctuary by Iona Whishaw, the settlement of Sudeten refugees in the Tomslake area and their plight in being dropped into a challenging environment without tools or money, is important to the story.
