= TPH Partners =

- Founded: 2008
- Headquarters: Heritage Plaza, 1111 Bagby, Houston, Texas, United States
- Key people: George M. McCormick, III (Managing Partner)
- Website: tphpartners.com

TPH Partners is a private equity firm headquartered in Houston, Texas, USA.

== History ==
TPH Partners was founded in 2008 as the private equity arm of Tudor, Pickering, Holt & Co., an investment bank.

In 2013, it established Elk Meadows Resources, a company focused on "acquiring and developing onshore oil and gas properties in the Permian Basin as well as the Rockies."

In 2015, it co-founded Laurel Mountain Energy with Vista Resources.
