= Canadian Pacific Limited =

Canadian railway company

Canadian Pacific Limited was created in 1971 to own properties formerly owned by Canadian Pacific Railway (CPR), a transportation and mining giant in Canada. In October 2001, CPR completed the corporate spin-offs of each of the remaining businesses it had not sold, including Canadian Pacific Railway Limited.

== History ==
Canadian Pacific Railway Company was incorporated on February 16, 1881, to build a railway linking British Columbia with Ontario and Quebec.

On July 5, 1971, the Canadian Pacific Railway Company was renamed Canadian Pacific Limited, reflecting the fact that for years it had been a diversified company.

On July 4, 1996, as part of a corporate reorganization, the Canadian Pacific Railway Company became a subsidiary of a new company that assumed the Canadian Pacific Limited name. Canadian Pacific Limited's non-railway operations also became subsidiaries of the new Canadian Pacific Limited, leaving the Canadian Pacific Railway Company with the railway operations.

In 2001, Canadian Pacific Limited completed the corporate spin-off of its 5 remaining subsidiaries.

== CP Hotels ==
The CPR built hotels along its railway routes across Canada. The first hotels were originally built in 1886 primarily to provide meal service for passengers in the Rocky Mountains where railway grades were too severe to justify the operation of Dining Cars. CPR's hotel network later expanded to include the Château Frontenac in Quebec City, Quebec, Chateau Lake Louise on Lake Louise in Alberta, the Banff Springs Hotel in Banff, Alberta, The Empress in Victoria, British Columbia, the Royal York in Toronto, Ontario, and The Algonquin in St. Andrews, New Brunswick among others.

In 2001, CPR acquired U.S. hotelier Fairmont (est. 1907) and merged it with CP Hotels to form Fairmont Hotels and Resorts. In some of the former CP Hotels, CP retained stores selling CPR-related items under the banner "CP Store".

== Railway ==
The flagship division of Canadian Pacific, the Canadian Pacific Railway began as a private tender to build a railway line connecting eastern Canada to the Pacific. Formed by a group of businessmen, the company was formally established in May 1881 under President George Stephen. The CPR was completed under the leadership of American William Cornelius Van Horne.

== Telecommunications ==
Along with railways, CPR also established telegraph operations to allow communications to remote areas. It was established as CPR Telegraph Company in 1894. It became CNCP Telecommunications in 1967 (co-owned with rival Canadian National Railway). It became Unitel Communications Incorporated (now Allstream Inc.) in 1990. Prior to the name change to Unitel, Rogers Communications acquired a stake in 1984 and later sold to AT&T Canada in 1984. Unitel disappeared into AT&T in 1993 and Rogers sold the rest by 1995. AT&T Canada was later sold by parent AT&T into an independent company, MTS Allstream.

Telegraph operations within CNCP under AT&T Canada ended in 1999 and sold to Montreal-based Télégrame Plus, which in 2002 became iTelegram's Canadian unit Telegrams Canada with head office in Toronto.

== Trucking ==
Along with trains, CP also operated trucking operations as part of its land shipping operations. It acquired Dominion Express Company in 1882. It became Canadian Pacific Express Company in 1926. It operated independently from the Railway with charges being assessed between companies for work done. It later became CP Express and Transport in a merger of trucking operations including Smith Transport, with extensive highway routes throughout Canada and into the United States. Changes brought on by deregulation caused great difficulties for all major trucking companies in Canada and eventually employees bought out CP in 1994 to form Interlink Freight Systems. However, competition from non-union companies and owner-operators was relentless, this and other difficulties on the US side finally brought about its demise. Operations ceased in July 1997. CP Ships trucking is known as "C Truck".

== Airline ==
CP purchased ten "bush plane" companies in the early 1940s and merged them to establish Canadian Pacific Air Lines in 1942 to service western Canada and the Far East routes. The airline provided passenger and parcel service to remote areas in Canada. The name was changed in June 1968 to CP Air, then sold in 1987 to Canadian Airlines International, flying as Canadian. The airline was acquired by Air Canada in the summer of 2000.

== Energy and mining ==
In 1883, a CPR crew accidentally discovered natural gas near Medicine Hat, Alberta. In 1912, CPR set up its Department of Natural Resources in Calgary to manage its timber, oil, gas, and mineral rights as well as land sales and immigration and colonization activities.

In 1958, CP created Canadian Pacific Oil and Gas Company (CPOG) to manage its oil, gas, and mineral rights. CPOG was merged with Central-Del Rio Oils to form PanCanadian Energy in 1971, to expand CP portfolio into energy exploration. PanCanadian was spun off by CP in 2002 and later merged with Alberta Energy Corporation to form EnCana (now Ovintiv).

Fording Coal, a coal mining company formed by CP, was also spun off in 2002 and operated as Fording Canadian Coal Trust. On July 29, 2008, Teck Cominco Ltd. (now Teck Resources) announced an agreement with Fording to purchase 100% of Fording's assets at a cost of $14.1 billion.

== Land ==
Canadian Pacific Investments was created in 1962. CPI became Canadian Pacific Enterprises Limited in 1980 and merged into CP Limited in 1985.

== Ships ==
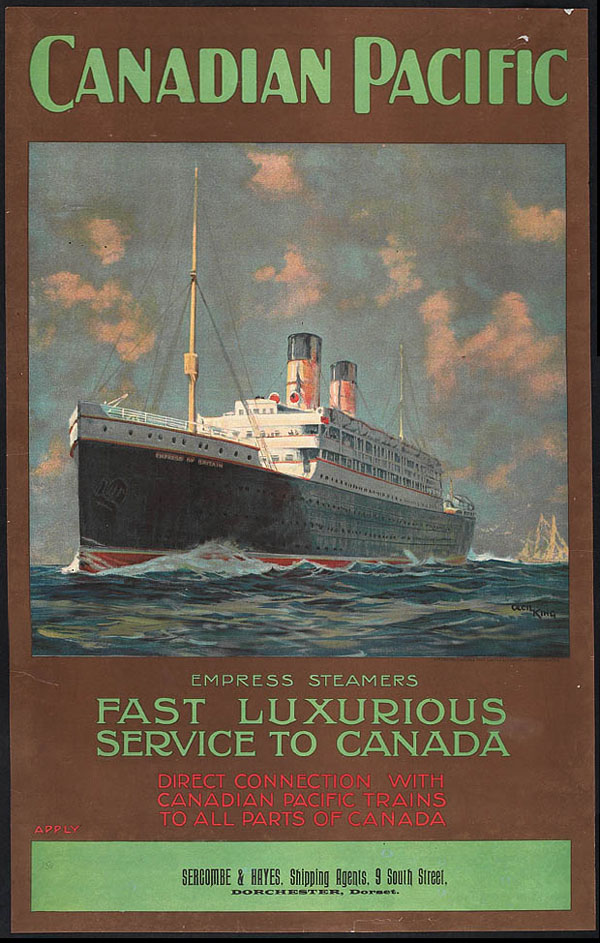
Empress steamship poster from 1920.

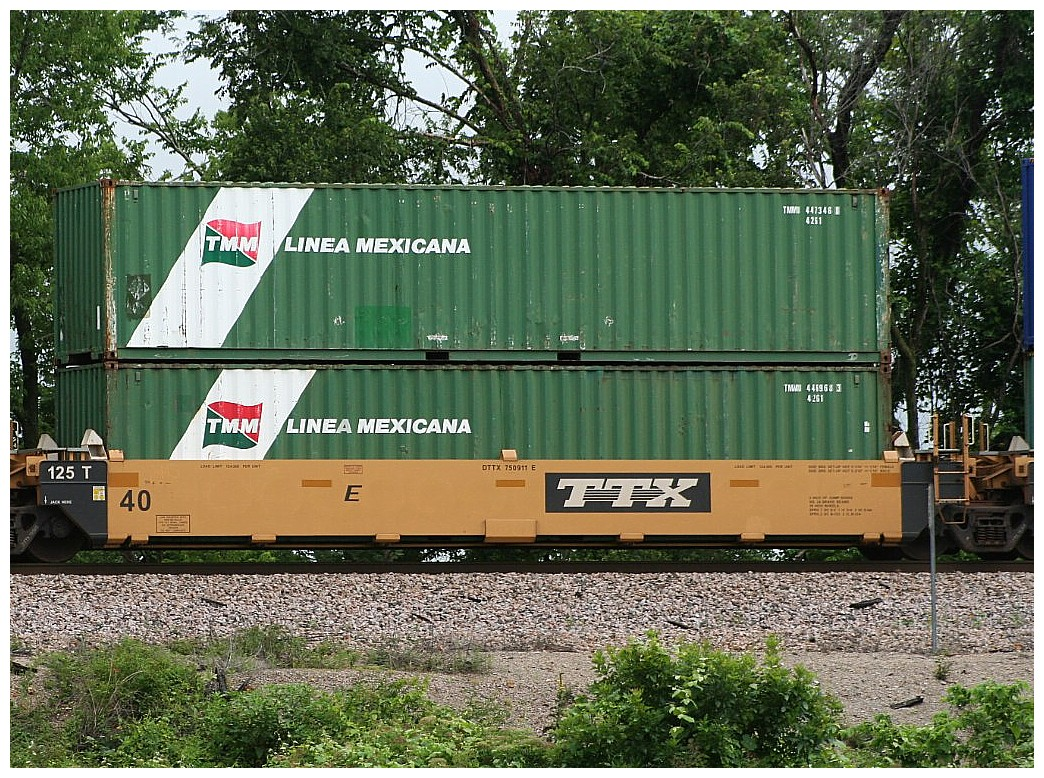
Transportación marítima mexicana (TMM) two 40-foot containers on a double stack train car, 2008

CP Ships commenced operations on April 28, 1891, when the first of its Empress ships started Trans-Pacific operations. It started Trans-Atlantic operations in 1903. With the diminishing role of ships as airlines took over transcontinental travel, CP Ships focused its operations to shipping goods. CP Ships began container shipping in 1964, with ships able to carry 12 containers. In 1984, CP co-founded the container shipping company Canada Maritime. It acquired full ownership in 1993. CP Ships' growth strategy was to acquire different shipping lines and integrate them into a company composed of many small sectors. Until the end of their history right before they were bought by Hapag Lloyd, almost all the acquisitions were retained as separate brands. CAST (Canadian Atlantic Sea Transport) was acquired in 1995. Contship Containerlines and the American company Lykes Lines were acquired in 1997. In 1998, acquisitions of Ivaran (which was not retained as a separate brand) and Australia New Zealand Direct Line were completed. TMM (Transportacion Maritima Mexicana), also known as Linea Mexicana, and CCAL (which was not retained as a separate brand) were acquired in 2000. In 2002, CP Ships acquired Italia Line, which used to be owned by the government's Finmare Group and was owned by D'amico at the time of purchase. CP Ships was spun off as a separate entity from CP in 2001, and acquired by Hapag-Lloyd in 2005.
