= List of natural gas pipelines =

This is a list of pipelines used to transport natural gas.

== Africa ==
- African Atlantic Gas Pipeline
- Escravos–Lagos Pipeline System
- Trans-Saharan gas pipeline (planned)
- West African Gas Pipeline

== Asia ==
- Altai gas pipeline (planned)
- Arab Gas Pipeline
- Pak Arab Pipeline Co. Ltd
- Sui Southern Pipeline Ltd
- Sui Northern Gas Pipelines Limited
- Bukhara-Tashkent-Bishkek-Almaty pipeline
- Central Asia-Center gas pipeline system
- Central Asia-China gas pipeline
- Dabhol-Bangalore Natural Gas Pipeline
- Dolphin Gas Project
- East West Gas Pipeline (India)
- HVJ Gas Pipeline
- Iran-Armenia Natural Gas Pipeline
- Iran-Pakistan-India gas pipeline (under construction)
- Tabriz–Ankara pipeline
- Korpezhe-Kurt Kui Pipeline
- Myanmar-Thailand Pipelines (3)
- Peninsular Gas Pipeline
- Sabah–Sarawak Gas Pipeline
- Shaan-Jing pipeline
- South Caucasus Pipeline (Baku-Tbilisi-Erzurum pipeline)
- Trans Thailand Malaysian Gas Pipeline
- Trans-Afghanistan Pipeline (planned)
- Trans-Caspian Gas Pipeline (planned)
- Pipeline Infrastructure Limited
- Yadana Pipeline
- Power of Siberia
- Zhongxian-Wuhan Pipeline

== Europe ==
European gas pipelines include:

=== InterEuropean ===
- Balticconnector, bi-directional connect between Estonian and Finnish gas grids.
- Baltic Pipe, from Denmark to Poland.
- BBL Pipeline, for bi-directional transport between the Netherlands and England.
- ENAGAS Pipeline, Spanish pipeline.
- GIPL, from Poland to Lithuania.
- Interconnector (North Sea), for bi-directional transport between Bacton Gas Terminal, England and Zeebrugge, Belgium.
- Interconnector Greece-Bulgaria, for linking the Greek and Bulgarian gas networks.
- JAGAL, German section of the Yamal-Europe pipeline.
- Langeled Pipeline, from Norway to England.
- MIDAL, German pipeline, from Bunde, Germany to South Germany, connecting to WEDAL and STEGAL.
- MEGAL, German pipeline, from Czech–German and Austrian–German borders to the German–French border.
- NEL pipeline, German pipeline, connects the Nord Stream 1 pipeline with the Rehden-Hamburg gas pipeline and MIDAL.
- National Transmission System, network throughout the UK.
- Netra, from Emden and Dornum to eastern Germany, connecting North Sea Gas fields to JAGAL.
- OPAL pipeline, a pipeline for connecting the Nord Stream 1 to the existing pipeline grid in Middle and Western Europe.
- Rehden-Hamburg gas pipeline, German pipeline branch of MIDAL supply Hamburg.
- Scotland-Northern Ireland pipeline, from Scotland to Northern Ireland.
- STEGAL, a central German pipeline connecting the JAGAL/Yamal–Europe pipeline and MIDAL
- South Wales Gas Pipeline, from the South Hook LNG terminal to the National Transmission System.
- Trans Austria Gas Pipeline, from Slovak-Austrian border at Baumgarten an der March to the border with Italy.
- Trans Europa Naturgas Pipeline (TENP), German pipeline from the German-Netherlands border near Aachen to the German-Swiss border near Schwörstadt, connects to the Transitgas Pipeline.
- Transitgas Pipeline, in Switzerland.
- West-Austria-Gasleitung
- WEDAL, German pipeline connecting Germany to Belgium network.

Planned pipelines for intereuropean gas transport:

- Baltic Gas Interconnector, (planned). Between Germany, Denmark and Sweden.
- South German natural gas pipeline (planned - cancelled). From Burghausen on the German-Austrian border to Lampertheim.
- Skanled (planned - cancelled). Connecting Norway to Sweden and Denmark.

=== Supply to Europe ===
==== From Africa ====
Mediterranean and Saharan gas pipelines to Europe.

All African routes run from Hassi R'Mel the Algerian hub for natural gas, it supplies gas from the Hassi R'Mel gas field. (The planned Trans-Saharan gas pipeline will connect Nigeria to Hassi R’Mel). Pipelines from Hassi R’Mel:

- Greenstream pipeline, from Libya to Italy, part of the Western Libyan Gas Project.
- Maghreb-Europe Gas Pipeline, from Algeria; Tanger, Morocco; Tarifa, Spain.
- Medgaz, from Algeria to Almeria, Spain.
- Trans-Mediterranean Pipeline, from Algeria via Tunisia to Sicily and thence to mainland Italy.

Planned pipeline for gas transport from Africa:

- GALSI, (planned - shelved). From Algeria to Sardinia and further northern Italy.

==== From Azerbaijan and Middle East ====
Baku pipelines

Pipelines connect mainly from the Shah Deniz gas field in Azerbaijan. Connections to the Middle East are possible:

- Eastring (proposed), an alternative to the South Stream, via Bulgaria, Romania, Hungary and Slovakia, for transport from the Black Sea, Caspian Sea, and Middle East.
- Southern Gas Corridor, To supply gas also from the Caspian and Middle Eastern regions. Consists of:
  - South Caucasus Pipeline, through Turkey to Erzurum. Runs parallel to the Baku–Tbilisi–Ceyhan oil pipeline.
  - Trans-Anatolian gas pipeline (TANAP) through Turkey, Greece, Albania to Italy. It is connected with Trans Adriatic Pipeline.
  - Trans Adriatic Pipeline, from (Azerbaijan), via Greece, Albania to Italy and further to Western Europe.
- Turkey–Greece pipeline, part of the Interconnector Turkey–Greece–Italy (ITGI)
- Greece-Italy pipeline (proposed), part of the Interconnector Turkey–Greece–Italy (ITGI)
- Qatar-Turkey pipeline (proposed).
- Trans-Caspian Gas Pipeline (proposed), eastward extension of Southern Gas Corridor to transport natural gas from Turkmenistan and Kazakhstan.
- White Stream, (proposed). Connecting the South Caucasus Pipeline, crossing the Black Sea to Constanta, Romania with further supplies to Central Europe.

A lecture was held at The Institute of World Politics to consider the economic and geopolitics of the rival pipelines and what's at stake for the concerned parties, namely TANAP and South Stream's replacement Turkish Stream.

==== From the North Sea gasfields ====
- CATS pipeline, from Central North Sea Everest gasfield to Teesside, England.
- Europipe I, from North Sea to Dornum, Germany.
- Europipe II, from Stavanger, Norway to Dornum, Germany.
- FLAGS, between North Sea gas fields.
- Franpipe, from the North Sea (mainly Sleipner gas field) to Dunkirk, France.
- Frigg UK System (FUKA), from the North Sea to St Fergus Gas Terminal, Scotland.
- Fulmar Gas Line, from the central North Sea to St Fergus Gas Terminal, Scotland.
- NOGAT Pipeline System, connects Dutch continental shelf with Den Helder, the Netherlands.
- Norpipe, from Ekofisk gasfield in the North Sea to Emden, Germany.
- SAGE
- SEAL from the Elgin-Franklin gasfield, to Bacton Gas Terminal, England.
- Statpipe, links northern North Sea gas fields with the Norway’s gas export system.
- Tyra West - F3 pipeline, pipeline connecting Danish and Dutch continental shelf pipeline systems to Den Helder.
- Vesterled, from the Heimdal gas field in the North Sea to St Fergus Gas Terminal, Scotland.
- Zeepipe, form North Sea to Zeebrugge, Belgium.

==== From Russia ====
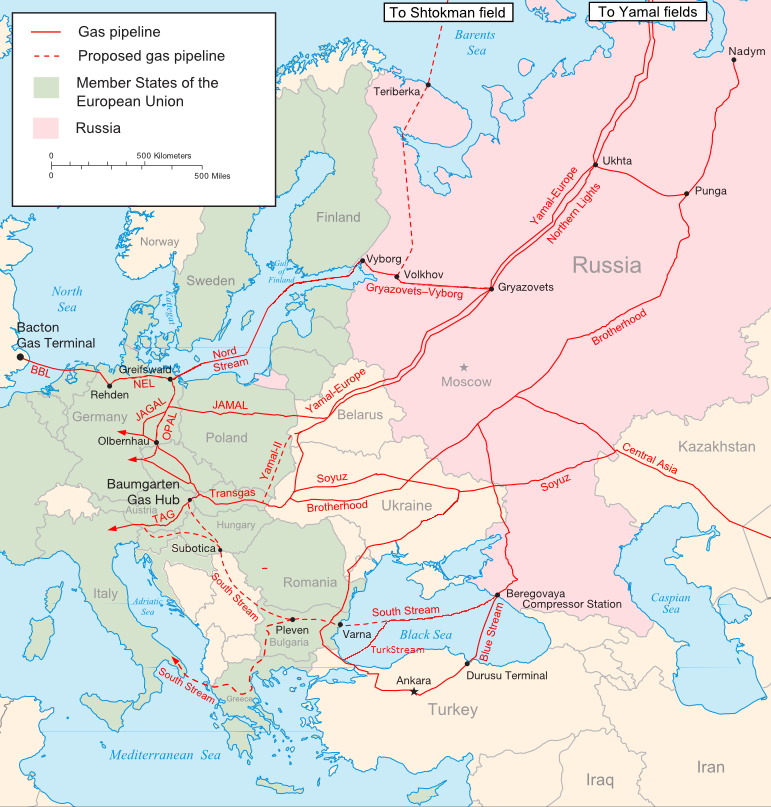
Russian gas pipelines to Europe (2021)

Completed pipeline projects:

- Blue Stream, from Russia through the Black Sea to Turkey.
- Gazela Pipeline, through Czech Republic, for Russian gas to Germany.
- MEGAL, from the Czech–German and Austrian–German borders to the German–French border, for transporting Russian Gas to Germany.
- Nord Stream 1 and 2 (North European underwater Gas Pipelines), submarine pipeline from Vyborg in the Russian Federation to Greifswald, Germany.
- Bratstvo pipeline, Progress Pipeline, Soyuz pipeline (also known in English as the Brotherhood Pipeline, the West-Siberian Pipeline and Trans-Siberian Pipeline). : runs parallel to the Urengoy–Pomary–Uzhhorod pipeline
- Yamal-Europe pipeline, from Western Siberia Russia to Germany. Runs partly parallel to the Northern Lights.
- JAGAL
- OPAL
- STORK, Czech-Polish interconnector

Proposed pipelines for gas transport from Russia:

- Nabucco Pipeline (also Turkey–Austria gas pipeline) (planned - canceled). From Erzurum, Turkey through Bulgaria, Romania, Hungary to Baumgarten an der March in Austria.
- South Stream, (planned - canceled). From Russia, through the Black Sea, Bulgaria, Serbia to Italy.

== North America ==
Interprovincial pipelines are regulated by the National Energy Board in Canada and the Federal Energy Regulatory Commission (FERC) in the US. Intrastate pipelines are regulated by state, provincial or local jurisdictions.

=== Canada ===
- Alliance Pipeline Limited Partnership
- Brunswick Pipeline (Emera Incorporated)
- Foothills Pipeline Ltd. (see TC PipeLines)
- Many Islands Pipe Lines (Canada) Ltd. (see TransGas)
- Maritimes & Northeast Pipeline
- TransCanada PipeLines, LP (TC PipeLines)
- TransGas
- TransQuebec & Maritimes Pipeline (see Gaz Métro & TC PipeLines)
- Sable Offshore Energy Inc. (SOEI)
- WestCoast Energy Inc.

=== Mexico ===
- Activo de Burgos - Pipeline Network
- Agua Prieta pipeline
- Burgos-Monterrey Pipeline
- Cadereyta Pipeline
- Los Ramones Pipeline
- Rosarito Pipeline- presently under North Baja Pipeline
- San Fernando Pipeline
- Tamazunchale Pipeline

=== Puerto Rico ===
- Vía Verde Pipeline

=== United States interstate pipelines ===
FERC requires most interstate pipelines to maintain an interactive web site with standardized information regarding their operations under a heading of "Informational Postings." The exact legal name of each company appears below. Many of these companies are wholly owned subsidiaries of larger publicly traded companies.

==== Major interstate pipelines ====
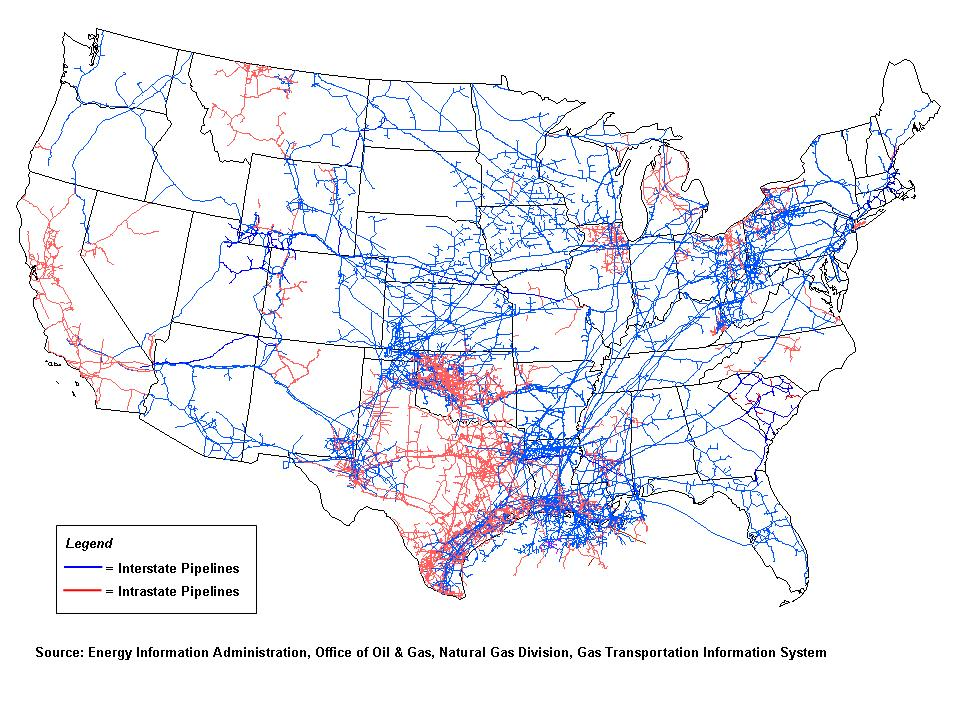
U.S. natural gas pipelines

- Alaskan Natural Gas Pipeline (planned)
- Algonquin Gas Transmission
- Alliance Pipeline
- ANR Pipeline Company — formerly Michigan, Wisconsin
- Atlantic Coast Pipeline (planned)
- Bluegrass Pipeline (proposed)
- CenterPoint Energy Gas Transmission Company
- Centerpoint Energy - Mississippi River — formerly, Mississippi River Transmission
- Colorado Interstate Gas Company
- Columbia Gas Transmission Corporation
- Columbia Gulf Transmission Company
- Devon Energy
- Dominion Transmission, Inc. (formerly Consolidated Gas Transmission)
- East Tennessee Pipeline
- El Paso Exploration & Production
- El Paso Natural Gas Company
- Enbridge
- Florida Gas Transmission Company
- Gas Transmission Northwest Corporation — formerly Pacific Gas Transmission
- Great Lakes Transmission
- Gulf South Pipeline — formerly, United Gas Pipeline Company
- Kern River Pipeline
- Keystone Pipeline
- Natural Gas Pipeline Company Of America
- Kinder Morgan Interstate Gas Transmission LLC — owned by Kinder Morgan Energy Partners, formerly Kansas Nebraska and KN Energy
- Magellan Midstream Partners
- Maritimes and Northeast Pipeline
- Midwestern Gas Transmission Company
- Mountain Valley Pipeline LLC
- National Fuel Gas Supply Corporation
- Northern Border Pipeline Company
- Northern Natural Pipeline
- Northwest Pipeline Corporation
- Panhandle Eastern Pipe Line Company, LP
- Portland Natural Gas Transmission System
- Questar Pipeline Company
- Rockies Express Pipeline
- Ruby Pipeline
- Sabal Trail Transmission Pipeline
- Southern Trails Pipeline
- Southern Natural Gas Company
- Southern Star Central Gas Pipeline, Inc
- Suncor Energy
- Tennessee Gas Pipeline Company
- Texas Eastern Transmission Pipeline
- Texas Gas Pipe Line Corporation
- Texas Gas Transmission, LLC
- Texas-Ohio Pipeline
- Trailblazer Pipeline Company
- Transcontinental Pipeline
- Transwestern Pipeline Company, LLC
- Trunkline Pipeline
- Viking Gas Transmission Company
- Williston Basin Pipeline
- Williams Companies

==== Minor interstate pipelines ====
- ANR Storage Company
- Arkansas Western Pipeline, L. L. C
- Black Marlin Pipeline Company
- Blue Dolphin Pipe Line Company
- Blue Lake Gas Storage Company
- Boundary Gas, Incorporated
- B-R Pipeline Company
- Canyon Creek Compression Company
- Caprock Pipeline Company
- Carolina Gas Transmission, a SCANA Company (formerly SCG Pipeline Inc./South Carolina Pipeline Corp)
- Central Kentucky Transmission Company
- Central New York Oil And Gas Company, LLC
- Chandeleur Pipe Line Company
- Cheyenne Plains Gas Pipeline Company, L.L.C.
- Clear Creek Storage Company, LLC
- Cotton Valley Compression LLC
- Crossroads Pipeline Company
- Discovery Gas Transmission LLC
- Dauphin Island Gathering Partners
- Destin Pipeline Company, L.L.C.
- Distrigas Corporation
- Dominion South Pipeline Co., LP
- Eastern Shore Natural Gas Company (incl. Eastern Shore Pipeline)
- Egan Hub Storage, LLC (d/b/a Spectra Energy)
- EMKEY Gathering LLC
- Enbridge Pipelines (Alatenn) L.L.C. (formerly, Alabama-Tennessee)
- Enbridge Pipelines (Midla) L.L.C. (formerly, Mid-Louisiana)
- Enbridge Pipelines (Kpc)
- Equitrans, L. P.
- Energy West Development, Inc.
- Freebird Gas Storage, L.L.C.
- Garden Banks Gas Pipeline, LLC
- Gas Gathering Corporation
- Gasdel Pipeline System, Inc.
- Gulf States Transmission Corporation
- Great Lakes Gas Transport, L.L.C.
- Guardian Pipeline, L.L.C.
- Granite State Gas Transmission, Inc.
- Honeoye Storage Corporation
- Horizon Pipeline Company, L.L.C.
- Iroquois Gas Transmission System, L.P.
- The Inland Gas Company
- Centra Pipelines Minnesota Inc.
- Jupiter Energy Corporation
- KO Transmission Company
- Kentucky West Virginia Gas Company
- Louisiana-Nevada Transit Company
- Mariposa Ranch Gas Pipeline Falfurrias
- Markwest New Mexico L.P. (Pinnacle)
- Millennium Pipeline Company, L.P.
- MIGC, Inc.
- Michigan Consolidated Gas Company
- Michigan Gas Storage Company
- Midwest Gas Storage, Inc.
- Mississippi Canyon Gas Pipeline, LLC
- Missouri Interstate Gas, LLC
- Mobile Bay Pipeline Company
- Mojave Pipeline Company
- Ngo Transmission, Inc.
- Nora Transmission Company
- Norteño Pipeline Company
- North Baja Pipeline, LLC
- North Penn Gas Company
- Oktex Pipeline Company
- Overthrust Pipeline Company
- Ozark Gas Transmission, L. L. C.
- Penn-York Energy Corporation
- Gas Transmission Northwest Corp.
- Pacific Interstate Transmission Company
- Paiute Pipeline Company
- Petal Gas Storage, L. L. C.
- Pine Needle LNG Company, LLC (peak shaving storage — not an import terminal)
- Puget Sound Energy, Inc.
- Revolution Pipeline
- Richfield Gas Storage System
- Riverside Pipeline Company, L. P.
- Sabine Pipe Line Company LLC
- Saltville Gas Storage Company L.L.C.
- Sea Robin Pipeline Company, LLC
- Southwest Gas Storage Company
- Steuben Gas Storage Company
- T C P Gathering Co.
- Total Peaking Services, L. L. C.
- Tuscarora Gas Transmission Company
- Trans-Union Interstate Pipeline, L.P.
- TransColorado Gas Transmission Company
- Vector Pipeline L.P.
- Venice Gathering System, L. L. C.
- Washington Natural Gas Company
- West Texas Gas, Inc.
- Western Gas Interstate Company
- Western Transmission Corporation
- Westgas Interstate, Inc.
- Young Gas Storage Company, Ltd.
- Wyoming Interstate Company, Ltd.
- Portland General Electric Company
- Nornew Energy Supply, Inc.
- Phillips Gas Pipeline Company
- U S G Pipeline Company

==== Predominantly offshore pipelines ====
- Black Marlin Pipeline Co.
- Chandeleur Pipeline Co.
- Destin Pipeline Co., LLC
- Dauphin Island Gathering Partners
- Discovery Gas Transmission LLC
- Enbridge Pipelines (UTOS) LLC
- Garden Banks Gas Pipeline, LLC
- Gulfstream Natural Gas System, L.L.C.
- High Island Offshore System, LLC
- Mississippi Gas Canyon Pipeline, LLC
- Nautilus Pipeline Co., LLC
- Panther Interstate Pipeline Energy, LLC
- Pacific Interstate Offshore Company
- Pacific Offshore Pipeline Company
- Sea Robin Pipeline Co.
- Shell Offshore, Inc.
- Stingray Pipeline Co., LLC
- Venice Gathering System, LLC

==== LNG import/export terminals ====
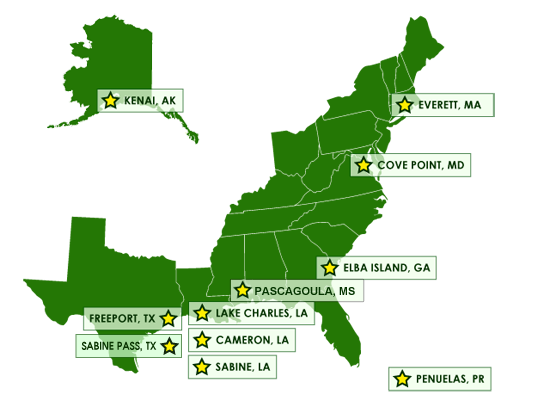
Current US LNG Terminals under FERC jurisdiction

- Kenai, AK (Conoco Phillips, Kenai LNG)
- Everett, MA (GDF Suez, Distrigas of Massachusetts LLC)
- Cove Point, MD (Dominion, Cove Point LNG)
- Elba Island, GA (El Paso, Southern LNG Inc.)
- Lake Charles, LA (Southern Union Company, Trunkline LNG Company, LLC)
- Pascagoula, MS (El Paso Gulf LNG)
- Freeport, TX (Freeport LNG)
- Sabine, LA (Cheniere, Sabine Pass LNG)
- Sabine Pass, TX (Golden Pass LNG)
- Cameron, LA (Sempra, Cameron LNG)
- Penuelas, PR (EcoElectrica)
- Offshore in Gulf of Mexico (Gulf Gateway Deepwater Port)
- Offshore from Gloucester, MA, (Northeast Gateway Deepwater Port)
- Offshore from Gloucester, MA (Neptune LNG)

==== Hinshaw pipelines ====
Although these pipelines flow gas in interstate commerce, they are subject to state regulation.

- Atlanta Gas Light Company
- Cobra Pipeline Company, Ltd
- East Ohio Gas Company
- Empire State Pipeline
- Michigan Consolidated Gas Company
- Nornew Energy Supply, Inc
- Northern Illinois Gas Company (Nicor Gas)
- Pacific Gas and Electric Company
- Recope Pipelines - Costa Rica
- Trans-Caribbean pipeline - (planned)
- Trans-Isthmian Pipeline - Panama

== South America ==
- Camisea Pipeline - Peru
- Cruz del Sur pipeline
- ECOPETROL Pipelines - Colombia
- NorAndino pipeline - Chile
- Gas Atacama Pipeline - Argentina
- Gas Andes Pipeline - Argentina
- Gas Pacífico Pipeline - Argentina
- Gasbol Pipeline - Brazil
- Gasoriente Pipeline - Colombia
- OCP Pipeline - Ecuador* GASENE
- GASUN
- Gran Gasoducto del Sur (Canceled)
- Paraná-Uruguaiana pipeline - Argentina/Brazil
- SOTE Pipeline - Ecuador
- TGN Pipeline Network - Argentina
- TGI Pipeline Network - Colombia
- TGS Pipeline Network - Argentina
- Trans-Caribbean pipeline - (planned)
- Urucu-Manaus pipeline - Brazil
- Yabog pipeline

== Oceania ==
- Amadeus Gas Pipeline, delivers gas from fields near Alice Springs to Darwin, also carries offshore supplies south
- Bayu-Undan to Darwin Pipeline, transmits gas from the Bayu-Undan facility to the Darwin LNG plant
- Carpentaria Gas Pipeline supplies Mount Isa from the east coast grid
- Dampier to Bunbury Natural Gas Pipeline
- Eastern Gas Pipeline, natural gas from Longford, Victoria to Horsely Park, Sydney
- Goldfields Gas Pipeline, Carnarvon Basin to Kalgoorlie
- Moomba Adelaide Pipeline System supplies gas from Moomba to Adelaide
- Moomba to Sydney Pipeline, parallel natural gas and ethane pipelines
- Northern Gas Pipeline, connects the Amadeus pipeline at Tennant Creek to the Carpentaria pipeline at Mount Isa
- Riverland Pipeline supplies the South Australian Riverland
- Roma to Brisbane Pipeline
- SEAGas pipeline, Otway Basin to Adelaide
- South West Queensland Pipeline (SWQP), bidirectional pipeline in southern Queensland
- Surat Basin to Gladstone Port (Natural Gas) -planned

== See also ==
- Cleveland East Ohio Gas Explosion
- Natural gas pipeline system in United States
- Pipeline accidents
- Pipeline transport
- Plains All American Pipeline - U.S. oil pipeline transmission and storage business
- Texas Eastern Transmission Corporation Natural Gas Pipeline Explosion and Fire
- List of natural gas pipelines in Western Australia
- List of oil pipelines
- List of oil refineries
