= Sonat =

Former American energy holding company

Sonat, Inc.
- Company type: Corporation
- Industry: Energy
- Founded: 1928 as Southern Natural Gas Company
- Founder: Christopher Chenery
- Fate: Merged
- Successor: El Paso Corporation
- Headquarters: AmSouth-Sonat Tower; Birmingham, Alabama, US
- Key people: Ronald L. Kuehn, Jr., Chief Executive Officer and President
- Products: Natural Gas Transmission and Exploration
- Revenue: ▲$4.17 billion (1998)
- Number of employees: 2,107 (1998)

Sonat, Inc., was a large Fortune 500 American energy holding company headquartered in Birmingham, Alabama. The company was founded in 1928 and was publicly traded on the New York Stock Exchange under the ticker symbol "SNT". Sonat was primarily involved in natural gas transmission and marketing and oil and gas exploration and production. The company was also involved in contract offshore drilling until 1995 when the offshore business became Transocean. Sonat was a leader and pioneer in natural gas transmission and offshore drilling, establishing many industry firsts in both sectors. In 1999, Sonat merged with El Paso Corporation.

== History ==
=== Southern Natural Gas Corporation, 1928–1970s ===
Sonat was founded in Birmingham, Alabama, as Southern Natural Gas Corporation in 1928 by Christopher Chenery. In 1953, the company spun off its natural gas utility division, forming Birmingham-based Alabama Gas Corporation which later became Energen. Also in 1953, the company created The Offshore Company when it purchased DeLong-McDermott, a contract drilling joint-venture between DeLong Engineering and J. Ray McDermott. The Offshore Company created the world's first Jackup rig a year later for Humble Oil. In 1968, the company expanded into the pulp and paper business through the creation of Southern Forest Products, Inc.

=== Southern Natural Resources, Inc., 1970s–1980s ===
In 1972, the company moved into its new 30-story corporate headquarters in downtown Birmingham. The building, called the First National-Southern Natural Building and later the AmSouth-Sonat Tower, was equally owned by and occupied with First National Bank of Birmingham. In May 1973, the company changed its name again to Southern Natural Resources, Inc. The company, which was quickly expanding, turned The Offshore Company into a wholly owned subsidiary in 1978 and soon changed the division's name to Sonat Offshore.

=== Sonat Inc., 1980s–1999 ===
By the 1980s, Southern Natural had diversified into many different businesses. After a November 1981 stockholder meeting, the company decided to change its name to Sonat Inc.. The company had been using the Sonat name, a portmanteau of "So" in Southern and "Nat" in Natural, for its exploration business for over a decade and its offshore business since 1978. Combining its businesses under a single name created a well-known identity in the energy industry. The new identity, created by Anspach Grossman Portugal, Inc. of New York, debuted on January 1, 1982. During this time, the company had revenues of $2.4 billion, was ranked as one of the largest companies in the U.S. and was the largest company in headquartered in Alabama. The company was also ranked as the largest pipeline producer by Forbes.

On March 27, 1986, the company expanded its pipeline division by acquiring 50% of Citrus Corporation, which owned Florida Gas Transmission, for $360 million in cash. Later the next year Sonat Marketing was formed to market and sell natural gas. By the end of the 1980s, the company was a leader in natural gas pipeline distribution, exploration and production, and offshore drilling. In 1993, the company's Sonat Offshore division was spun off as Sonat Offshore Drilling, Inc. In June 1995, the company sold its remaining stake in Sonat Offshore division to stockholders. On November 23, 1997, Sonat expanded its Exploration and Production division by acquiring Zilkha Energy for $1.3 billion.

==== Merger with El Paso ====
In March 1999, Sonat announced it was merging with El Paso Corporation in a $6 billion deal in an effort for El Paso to maintain competition in the natural gas markets. At the time of the merger, Sonat was a Fortune 500 company. The E&P unit, Sonat Exploration Company, was blended into El Paso's organization, and the gas transmission unit, Southern Natural Gas Company, is still headquartered in the Birmingham area.

== Sonat divisions ==
Sonat Inc.'s corporate headquarters and several of its divisions were located in the AmSouth-Sonat Tower in Birmingham, Alabama. Sonat also had offices in Houston, Oklahoma City, Washington, D.C., New York City, and London. By 1999, the company's divisions consisted of natural gas distribution, natural gas marketing, and exploration and production.

=== Southern Natural Gas Company ===
Southern Natural Gas Company, headquartered in Birmingham, was Sonat's natural gas transmission division. The division owned the Sea Robin Pipeline, South Georgia Natural Gas Company, one-third interest in Destin Pipeline, and 50% of Florida Gas Transmission. Sonat sold Sea Robin Pipeline in 1999 as a requirement to complete its merger with El Paso. After being acquired by El Paso in 1999, Southern Natural Gas continued to operate as a separate division and kept its corporate headquarters in the AmSouth-Sonat Tower until 2007, when it relocated to the Colonial Brookwood Center located in a suburb of Birmingham. Kinder Morgan purchased El Paso in 2011.

Southern Natural Gas Company still exists today and is a 50/50 joint venture between Kinder Morgan and Southern Company.

=== Sonat Marketing ===
Sonat Marketing was headquartered in Birmingham and was primarily engaged in the marketing of natural gas. The company also operated Sonat Power Marketing which marketed and sold electrical power.

=== Sonat Exploration ===
Sonat Exploration Company, headquartered in Houston, Texas, was the exploration and production division of Sonat. The company had regional offices in Fort Smith, Arkansas, Shreveport, Louisiana, Oklahoma City, Oklahoma, and Houston and Tyler, Texas. As a result of the merger with El Paso, the regional offices were closed and the holdings were blended into El Paso's Exploration and Production division.

== Former divisions ==
=== Sonat Offshore/Transocean ===
Sonat Offshore was formed in 1953 by Southern Natural Gas when it established The Offshore Company to own mobile jackup rigs in the Gulf of Mexico. The company's name was changed to Sonat Offshore Drilling in 1982. In 1993, Sonat took Sonat Offshore public. Sonat fully divested itself of Sonat Offshore in 1995. In 1996, Sonat Offshore acquired Norwegian Transocean ASA and adopted the name Transocean Offshore to differentiate itself from its former parent company. Today Transocean is one of the largest offshore drilling contractors in the world.

=== Sonat Marine ===
Sonat Marine was formed in 1981 when Sonat purchased Interstate Oil Transportation Company of Philadelphia, Pennsylvania for $109 million. Interstate had been the nation's largest independent marine transporter of petroleum products. In 1987, a group of Sonat Marine executives and managers formed a partnership to acquire the company from Sonat for $234 million.

=== Teleco Oilfield Services ===
Sonat acquired Teleco Oilfield Services for $141 million in 1984 to expand its existing oilfield services business. Teleco provided measurement-while-drilling services to the offshore drilling industry through a system it had developed where it could communicate data about conditions thousands of feet underground to the surface without interrupting the drilling process. Sonat exited in the oilfield services business in 1992 when it sold Teleco to Baker Hughes for $400 million and a 5 percent royalty payment for five years on certain technology revenues. During Sonat's ownership, it tripled Teleco's annual revenue from $51 million in 1983 to $153 million in 1990, grew headcount to over 1,300 employees worldwide, and deployed its technology to offshore drillers in the Gulf of Mexico, North Sea, Middle East, Africa, and Asia.

=== Southern Forest Products ===
Southern Forest Products was formed in 1968 to manage the company's more than 800,000 acres of timberland and natural resource holdings in the southeast. The division also owned a 50% interest in Boise Southern, the company's pulp and paper mill operations in Louisiana that were a joint venture with Boise Cascade. Sonat sold its interest in Boise Southern to Boise Cascade in 1984. After the sale of Boise Southern was completed, Sonat reorganized Southern Forest Products into Sonat Minerals and Sonat Minerals Leasing which continued to manage the company's land holdings and mineral rights.
