= High Island Offshore System =

Gas pipelines in Gulf of Mexico

High Island Offshore System is a natural gas pipeline system that gathers gas in the offshore Gulf of Mexico and brings it into ANR Pipeline's eastern leg and Enbridge Pipelines UTOS. It is owned by El Paso Corporation. Its FERC code is 77.

On 30 September 2004, Enterprise Products Partners LP purchased the 204-mile long HIOS from GulfTerra.
