= Questar Pipeline =

Coordinates: 40°46′N 111°53′W

Dominion Energy Questar Pipeline
- Industry: Natural Gas
- Headquarters: Salt Lake City, Utah, United States
- Products: Natural Gas
- Parent: Dominion Energy Midstream Partners
- Website: www.questarpipeline.com

Questar Pipeline Company (QPC) provides natural gas transportation and underground storage services from the Rocky Mountains region. Its FERC code is 55. Questar Pipeline is a subsidiary of Questar Corporation. Questar Corporation was acquired in 2016 by Dominion Energy.

== Background ==
Dominion Energy Questar Pipeline, LLC is a subsidiary of Dominion Energy Midstream Partners, LP (NYSE: D) an interstate natural gas pipeline company that provides transportation and underground storage services in Utah, Wyoming and Colorado. DEQP owns and operates slightly more than 2,500 miles (4,000 km) of pipeline with total daily capacity of 2,530 million decatherms or 2.530×10^{15} Btu (741 TWh). The company's system is in the Rocky Mountains, near large reserves of natural gas in six major producing areas, including the Greater Green River, Uinta and Piceance basins.

DEQP transports gas from these areas to other major pipeline systems for delivery to markets in the West and Midwest including Dominion Energy's local natural gas distribution system serving Questar Gas' natural gas utility customers in Utah, southwest Wyoming and southern Idaho.

Through wholly owned subsidiaries, Dominion Energy Midstream Partners, LP also owns and operates the Overthrust Pipeline in southwestern Wyoming and the eastern segment of Southern Trails Pipeline, extending 488 miles (785 km) from the Blanco Hub to just inside the California state line. Questar Pipeline owns 50% of the White River Hub in western Colorado. These facilities connect with six interstate pipeline systems and a major processing plant near Meeker, Colorado.

DEQP owns and operates the Clay Basin storage facility. Located on the Wyoming-Utah border, Clay Basin is the largest underground storage reservoir in the Rocky Mountains Region.

== See also ==
- List of North American natural gas pipelines
