= Bissingen =

Bissingen may refer to:

- Bissingen, Bavaria, municipality in Bavaria, Germany
- Bissingen an der Teck, municipality in Esslingen district, Baden-Württemberg, Germany
- Bietigheim-Bissingen, town in Ludwigsburg district, Baden-Württemberg, Germany
- FSV 08 Bissingen, an association football club based in Bietigheim-Bissingen
