= Douglas Foshee =

American businessman

Douglas L. Foshee
- Education: Southwest Texas State University; Rice University

Douglas Foshee is an American businessman.

== Career ==
Foshee earned a bachelor's degree from Southwest Texas State University in 1982 and an MBA from Rice University in 1992. Foshee worked for ARCO International Oil and Gas as an energy lender and served as CEO of Torch Energy Advisors. Foshee became CEO of Nuevo Energy in 1997, but quit in 2000 after Nuevo's board decided to pay his bonus in stock options instead of in cash. In 2001, Foshee became the CFO of Halliburton, where he handled an SEC investigation and litigation regarding asbestos. In 2003, El Paso Corp. hired Foshee as its CEO. In 2012, Foshee served as the lead negotiator for El Paso in Kinder Morgan's purchase of El Paso. Shareholders of El Paso sued to stop the merger, alleging that Foshee had failed to get the best price for El Paso, but Delaware judge Leo E. Strine Jr. allowed the deal to go through.

Foshee has served as a director or trustee for Cameron International Corporation, AIG Credit Facility Trust, EP Energy LLC, and El Paso Corp. Foshee served as a trustee of AIG after it was bailed out by the government in 2008.

== Other activities ==
Foshee donated $750,000 to Jeb Bush's 2016 presidential candidacy.

In the midst of the Houston Independent School District takeover, Foshee voiced support of the controversial HISD Bond Measure. The HISD Bond Measure was subsequently voted down due to grassroots efforts of Harris county citizens overcoming the media blitz sponsored by Foshee and his ilk.
