= South German natural gas pipeline =

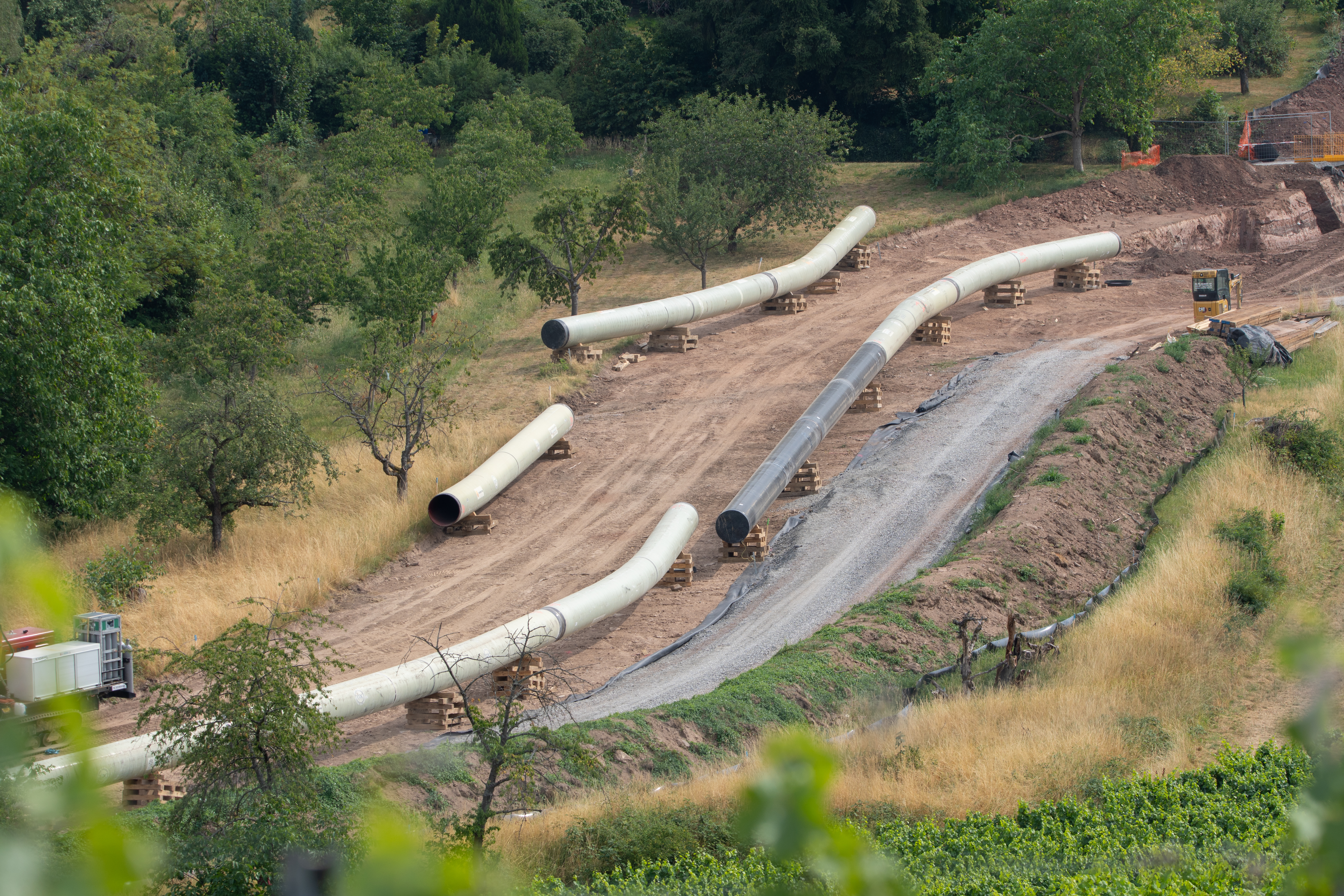
- Construction near Stetten, July 2026
- Location of SEL pipeline, with color coded sections

Location
- Country: Germany
- Direction: west–east
- Start: Lampertheim
- To: Bissingen

General information
- Type: natural gas
- Partners: EnBW
- Operator: Terranets BW
- Construction started: 2024

Technical information
- Length: 250 km (160 mi)

South German natural gas pipeline (German: Süddeutsche Erdgasleitung (SEL)) is a natural gas pipeline project in Southern Germany, in the north-eastern part of the state of Baden-Württemberg, connecting to existing pipelines in Hesse and Bavaria. A 250 km long pipe with diameters of 100 to 120 cm, able to also transport hydrogen ("H₂ ready"), is supposed to be built from 2024 to 2032, in five sections, of which the central one is already operational.

== Old Project ==
The original project was planned to run from Burghausen on the German-Austrian border to Lampertheim, state of Hesse. The length of the pipeline was to be about 500 kilometres (310 mi) and the diameter was to be 1,200 millimetres (47 in). The pipeline was to be constructed jointly by E.ON Ruhrgas and Wingas, a joint venture of Wintershall and Russian Gazprom. Expected to cost €600 million ($759.2 million), the project was stopped in November 2008, mainly due to difficulties in financing. According to Wingas, the pipeline project was not economically sustainable; hence the halt of operations.

== Pipeline ==
Energy in Germany largely depends on imports. Nuclear power in Germany, with three nuclear power plants in the state of Baden-Württemberg, Obrigheim, Phillippsburg, Neckarwestheim, was phased out from 2005 to 2023. Fossil generation is mostly using imported hard coal, transported via the rivers Rhine to power stations in Mannheim and Karlsruhe, and via the Neckar to Heilbronn Power Station and Altbach Power Station near Esslingen. The station at Stuttgart-Gaisburg was switched from coal to gas in 2018. To enable Coal_phase-out#Germany until 2030/2038, a sufficient supply of natural gas or H2 is required.

The SEL project was revived under new ownership and with a different, shortened route that connects Hesse and Bavaria, and the regions of Heilbronn, Stuttgart, Esslingen. Planning was taken over by Terranets BW, a subsidiary of state-owned EnBW. The new SEL is a 250 km (160 mi) pipeline from Lampertheim to Bissingen in Bavaria, designed to initially transport natural gas and from the early 2030s hydrogen as part of the German hydrogen core network (Wasserstoff-Kernnetz). The first 24 km (15 mi) section from Heilbronn to Löchgau has been operational since December 2024. The last outstanding planning approval (Planfeststellungsbeschluss) for the route was issued by the Regierungspräsidium Karlsruhe on 18 March 2025. Construction of the 61 km (38 mi) section between Heidelberg and Heilbronn started in August 2025 and is scheduled for completion by the end of 2026.

=== Sections ===
| Color in map | Section | Length | Status |
|---|---|---|---|
| red | Lampertheim (Hesse) – Heidelberg-Grenzhof | 14 km | construction preparation, operation not before 2030 |
| blue | HD-Grenzhof – Heilbronn-Kirchhausen | 61 km | under construction since August 2025, operation planned for end of 2026 |
| green | HN-Kirchhausen – Löchgau | 24 km | in operation since December 2024 |
| orange | Löchgau – Esslingen/Aichschieß | 43 km | under construction since early 2025 |
| purple | ES/Aichschieß – Amerdingen (Bissingen, Bavaria) | c. 108 | permission |
