= Revolution Pipeline =

Natural gas pipeline in Pennsylvania

Revolution Pipeline is a 40.5-mile (65.2 km) long 24-inch natural gas pipeline, carrying natural gas between two processing facilities and traversing Allegheny County, Beaver County, Butler County, and Washington County in Pennsylvania. It is owned and operated by Energy Transfer Partners.

On September 10, 2018, a landslide caused by the construction of the pipeline produced an explosion, resulting in one of the largest civil penalties issued by the Pennsylvania state Department of Environmental Protection (DEP) against Energy Transfer. The financial penalty was part of a settlement agreement between the department and Energy Transfer subsidiary ETC Northeast Pipeline LLC.

== See also ==
- List of natural gas pipelines
