= East Tennessee Natural Gas Pipeline =

East Tennessee Natural Gas Pipeline is a natural gas pipeline that brings gas from eastern Tennessee to Virginia and North Carolina. It was formerly owned by Duke Energy but is now owned by Enbridge. Its FERC code is 2.

== Characteristics ==
The East Tennessee Natural Gas Pipeline is a 1,510 mile long pipe (2430 km) operated by Enbridge. Enbridge is a North American Energy Company who is in charge of the pipeline. The pipeline runs from Tennessee to Roanoke, Virginia giving it a capacity of about 1.86 billion cubic feet per day. The Texas Eastern Transmission Gas Pipeline, Tennessee Gas Pipeline, Columbia Gas Pipeline, Southern Natural Gas Pipeline, and the Midwestern Gas Transmission Company Gas Pipeline all interconnect with the East Tennessee Natural Gas Pipeline.

== Safety concerns ==
Back in December 2018, the East Tennessee Natural Gas Pipeline exploded which caused the pipeline to be temporarily out of service. The incident affected customers until January 2019. Residents impacted by this were advised to turn down thermostats, wash laundry in cold water, and anything else to help reduce the usage of natural gas. In response to the incident, Enbridge completed repairs back in December. The repairs were actually done sooner than expected because they were projected to be done in mid-January, but they were repaired in late December the same month the explosion occurred.

== See also ==
- List of North American natural gas pipelines
