= Viking Gas Transmission =

Viking Gas Transmission is a natural gas pipeline which takes gas from the TransCanada pipeline in Minnesota and brings it to Wisconsin. It is owned by ONEOK Partners. Its FERC code is 82.

== Viking transmission system (UK) ==
The Viking transmission system (VTS) also refers to natural gas infrastructure in the UK sector of the southern North Sea. The Viking gas field is located in Block 49/17 and had recoverable reserves of 79.30 billion cubic metres. It was developed through two installations Viking A and Viking B. These also received gas from satellite fields. Gas was transmitted from Viking A to the onshore Viking gas terminal via an 87 mile 28-inch diameter pipeline. Gas production started in 1972 and ceased in 2018. The Viking gas terminal was renamed Theddlethorpe gas terminal in the late 1980s and was demolished in 2021.

== See also ==
- List of North American natural gas pipelines
