= TransColorado Pipeline =

TransColorado Pipeline is a natural gas pipeline that transports gas across Colorado to either the San Juan Basin or Denver and the Colorado Interstate Gas system. It is owned by Kinder Morgan Energy Partners. Its FERC code is 143.
