= ANR Pipeline =

ANR Pipeline delivers gas from Texas, the Oklahoma panhandle region, and Louisiana to the Midwest and Great Lakes region. It has two legs, one from Texas and the other from Louisiana, which meet near Chicago.

== History ==
ANR was founded as the Michigan-Wisconsin Pipe Line Company on July 25, 1945. In 1947, the company received federal approval to build a $52 million, 1,800-mile-long pipeline from Texas to the Detroit-Ann Arbor area and to sections of Wisconsin, Missouri and Iowa. The Michigan-Wisconsin Pipeline began operations on November 1, 1949. The pipeline ran from Hansford County in the Texas Panhandle through Oklahoma, Kansas, Nebraska, Missouri and Iowa to Illinois, where it branches in two with one line to serve Michigan and the other Wisconsin.

The Michigan-Wisconsin Pipe Line Company's name was changed in 1984 to the ANR Pipeline Company, in order to identify the company more closely with its parent, American Natural Resources. In 1985, American Natural Resources was acquired by Coastal Corporation. El Paso Energy acquired Coastal Corporation in 2001. El Paso Energy sold ANR Pipeline to TransCanada Corporation in 2007.

=== Incidents ===
Explosion of 1993

On November 23, 1993, there was an explosion on the pipeline in New Castle, Indiana.

==== Explosion of 2008 ====
On March 11, 2008, an explosion occurred on the pipeline 15 miles (24 km) off the coast of Marsh Island, Louisiana, in the Gulf of Mexico, while the Motor Vessel Jillian Morrison was bleeding natural gas from a shut section of a pipeline into a tank on the vessel. Six crew members of the vessel were injured and one left missing.

==== Rupture of 2014 ====
On September 16, 2014, around 2am EDT, a rupture occurred on the pipeline in Benton Township, Berrien County, Michigan. About 520 people were evacuated.

== See also ==
- Horizon Pipeline
- Panhandle Eastern
