= Trans Thailand–Malaysia Gas Pipeline =

Trans Thailand–Malaysia Gas Pipeline (TTM) is a gas pipeline linking suppliers in Malaysia to consumers in Thailand. It is a part of the Trans-ASEAN Gas Pipeline project.

== History ==
The pipeline and gas separation project began in February 2000 to transport and process natural gas from the gas reserves in the Thai-Malaysia joint offshore development area. The development area is approximately 255 kilometres (158 mi) east of Songkhla Province in the Gulf of Thailand and covers an area of 7,250 square kilometres (2,800 sq mi).

Construction on the pipeline started in mid-2003 and was completed in 2006-2007. It was built by the Trans Thai-Malaysia (Thailand) Ltd., a project company of Petronas and the PTT Public Company Limited.

== Description ==
The TTM project consists of the gas pipeline project and the Songkhla Gas Separation Plant project geared to making LPG. The pipeline has a diameter of 34 to 42 inches (860 to 1,070 mm).

Thailand also has two existing pipelines with Myanmar and a third under construction.

== See also ==
- List of natural gas pipelines
- List of LNG terminals
