= North Baja Pipeline =

Natural gas pipeline

The North Baja Pipeline is an overall 220-mile (350 km), bidirectional natural gas pipeline which can deliver gas from Arizona, through California, and into Mexico or from Mexico into the United States. It entered service in the US- Mexico direction in 2002. Once an LNG plant in Mexico will be finished in 2026, the plan is to switch directions.

== Geography ==
The 80 miles long North Baja Pipeline begins in Ehrenberg, Arizona, and ends in Ogilby, California, near the US-Mexican border.

There it connects to the eastern end of the 140 miles (302 km) long "Gasoducto Rosarito", formerly known as "Gasoducto Bajanorte", so named because Presidente Juarez Power plant, a natural-gas-fired power plant in Rosarito, Baja California (suburb of Tijuana) has been using 25% of the gas as of 2007.

Gasoducto Rosarito runs South of the US Mexican border in east–west direction to Rosarito. A North South spur, also known as LNG Spur, starts at the Costa Azul LNG terminal north of Ensenada, Baja California ( 31° 59' 29.8" Latitud North, 116° 50' 49.5" Longitud West) and connects with Gasoducto Rosario near El Carrizo south of Tecate, Baja California.

== History ==
North Baja Pipeline was originally conceived as an east-to-west pipeline to provide electric power plants in Mexico with natural gas from Arizona via California. It entered service in 2002.

In 2007, an expansion was approved, to allow gas to flow from west to east, for importation of natural gas into the United States.

The source of the natural gas to the US would be the liquefied natural gas export terminal on the Pacific Coast of Mexico called Costa Azul (Energia Costa Azul), owned by a subsidiary of Sempra, which was still under construction as of 2023, to begin service in mid 2025. In November 2024, the completion date was thought to be 2026.

The pipeline will be capable of transporting up to 600 million cubic feet a day of natural gas in either direction.

In 2022, the US Federal Energy Regulatory Commission (FERC) approved a capacity expansion to export more U.S. gas to Mexico, including the Costa Azul LNG plant .

The 80-mile (130 km) U.S. portion of the system is owned by Canadian TransCanada TC PipeLines LP, and the 140-mile (230 km) Mexican portion is owned by San Diego-based Sempra Energy International. Its FERC code is 181.

== See also ==
- List of North American natural gas pipelines
