= Cheyenne Plains Gas Pipeline =

Gas pipeline in the United States

Cheyenne Plains Gas Pipeline is a pipeline that brings gas from the Rocky Mountains to the Midwest. It is owned by Kinder Morgan. Its FERC code is 188.

The system consists of pipeline 36 inches in diameter, in a network spanning 410 miles. It extent begins near the Wyoming-Colorado border, and continues to end near South Central Kansas. Market areas served by the pipeline include areas in the Midwest as well as many other mid-continent pipelines located in South Central Kansas.
