= Mojave Pipeline =

Natural gas pipeline in Arizona and California

The Mojave Pipeline is a natural gas pipeline that brings natural gas into California from Arizona. It is owned by El Paso Corporation. Its FERC code is 92.

== Identification ==
The Mojave Pipeline is known to connect to the Kinder Morgan pipeline that is estimated to be around 10,200 miles long. They connect in Cadiz, California. It reaches from the San Juan, Permian and Anadarko basins all the way to California. The pipeline runs El Paso Natural Gas, which is commonly known as EPNG. It moves the gas product to the areas of Arizona, Nevada, New Mexico, Oklahoma, Texas, and northern Mexico. The Mojave Pipeline itself is estimated to be around 500 miles long. The Mojave Pipeline enters the region at the northern Arizona and California border. It then crosses to Kern County, where it merges with the Kern River Transmission Company system. It was extended into California in the year of 1992.
