= Sea Robin Pipeline =

Submarine natural gas pipeline system

Sea Robin Pipeline is a submarine natural gas pipeline system which brings natural gas from the offshore oil wells in the Ship Shoal area of the central Gulf of Mexico onto the central Louisiana coast.

Its West Area lines connect into the Henry Hub, a distribution hub of the natural gas pipeline system in Erath, Louisiana. Its East Area lines connect to processing plants near Morgan City, Louisiana.

Its FERC code is 6.

== Responsible parties ==
Sea Robin Pipeline Company, LLC is owned by CMS Panhandle Companies, a part of Energy Transfer Partners based in Dallas.

Sea Robin was formerly owned by Sonat, Inc. through its subsidiary Southern Natural Gas Company. Sonat was required to sell the pipeline in 1999 in order to complete its merger with El Paso Corporation.

== See also ==
- Gulf of Mexico oil fields of the United States
