= Great Lakes Transmission =

Great Lakes Transmission is a natural gas pipeline that brings gas from western Canada through Minnesota, Wisconsin and Michigan before re-entering Canada. Along the way it provides gas to ANR Pipeline. Its FERC code is 51.

The pipeline was opened in 1967, running 2,115 miles (3,404 km) between Emerson, Manitoba and St. Clair, Michigan. The system has 14 compressor stations capable of transporting up to 2,400 million cubic feet (68 million cubic metres) per day.

The pipeline is operated by Great Lakes Gas Transmission L.P., headquartered in Houston, TX.

== See also ==
- List of North American natural gas pipelines
