= Dominion Transmission =

Dominion Transmission is a natural gas pipeline that brings gas from the Dominion Cove Point LNG terminal in Maryland and gas from Ohio and Virginia into extensive natural gas storage fields in Pennsylvania and West Virginia, and also brings gas into New England. It is owned by Dominion Resources. Its FERC code is 22.
