= Colorado Interstate Gas =

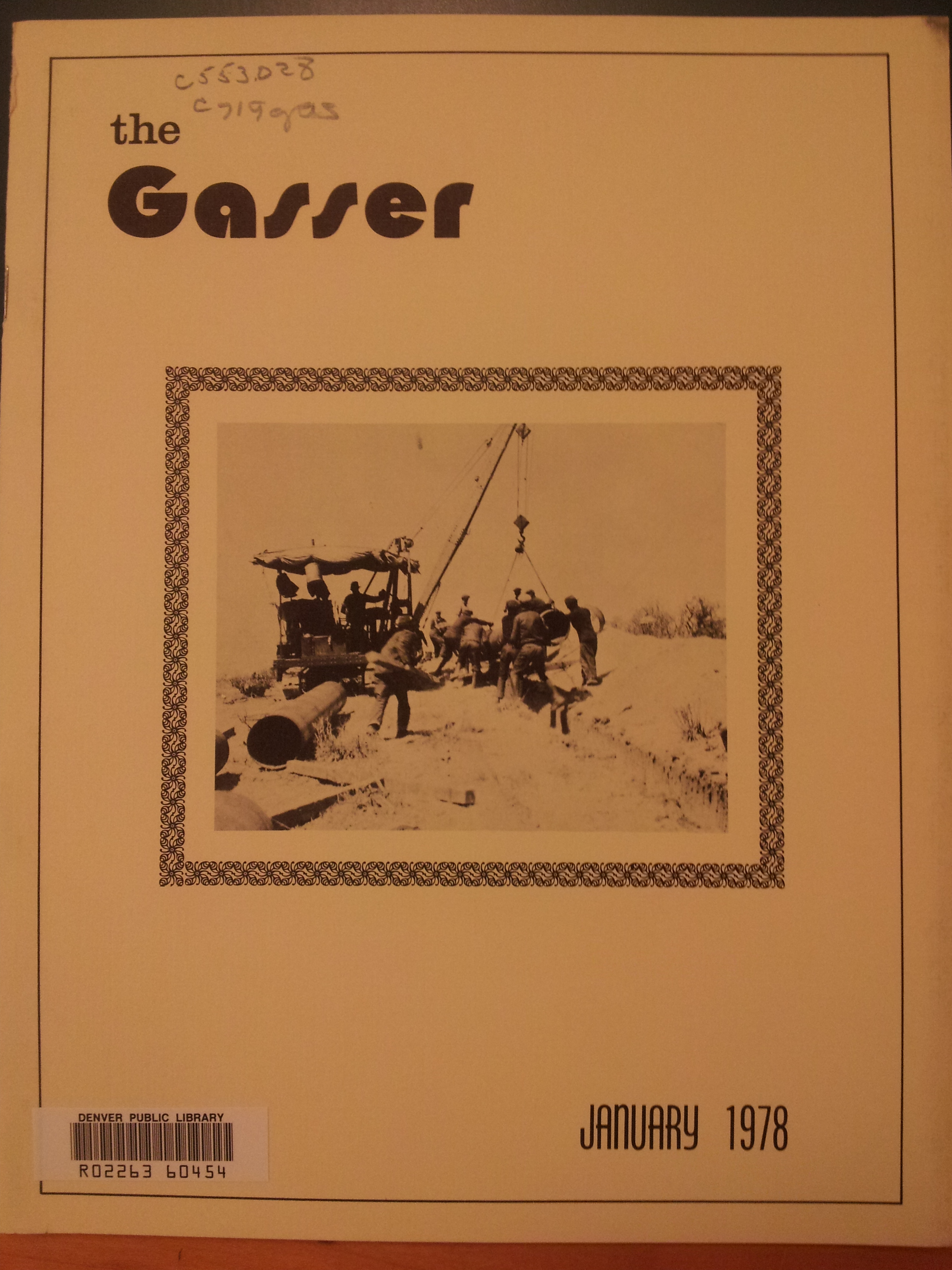
CIG The Gasser

Colorado Interstate Gas (CIG) is a major producer of natural gas, connected to major supply basins in the Rocky Mountains and production areas in the Texas Panhandle, western Oklahoma, western Kansas, and Wyoming. Originally an independent company, CIG is now a subsidiary of Kinder Morgan.

== History ==
In 1927, three companies with the natural gas leases, the market and the money combined with the know-how, came together to form the Canadian River Gas Company, which produced the gas from the Panhandle Gas Field and piped it to Clayton, New Mexico, where Colorado Interstate Gas Company purchased it and transported it to Denver. CIG began service on 1 June 1928 and gas first reached Pueblo, Colorado, on 19 June, and Denver on 22 June on a route established by John Paul (Mr. Mac) McClintock.

In 1928, CIG has 428 miles of pipeline and 105 employees.

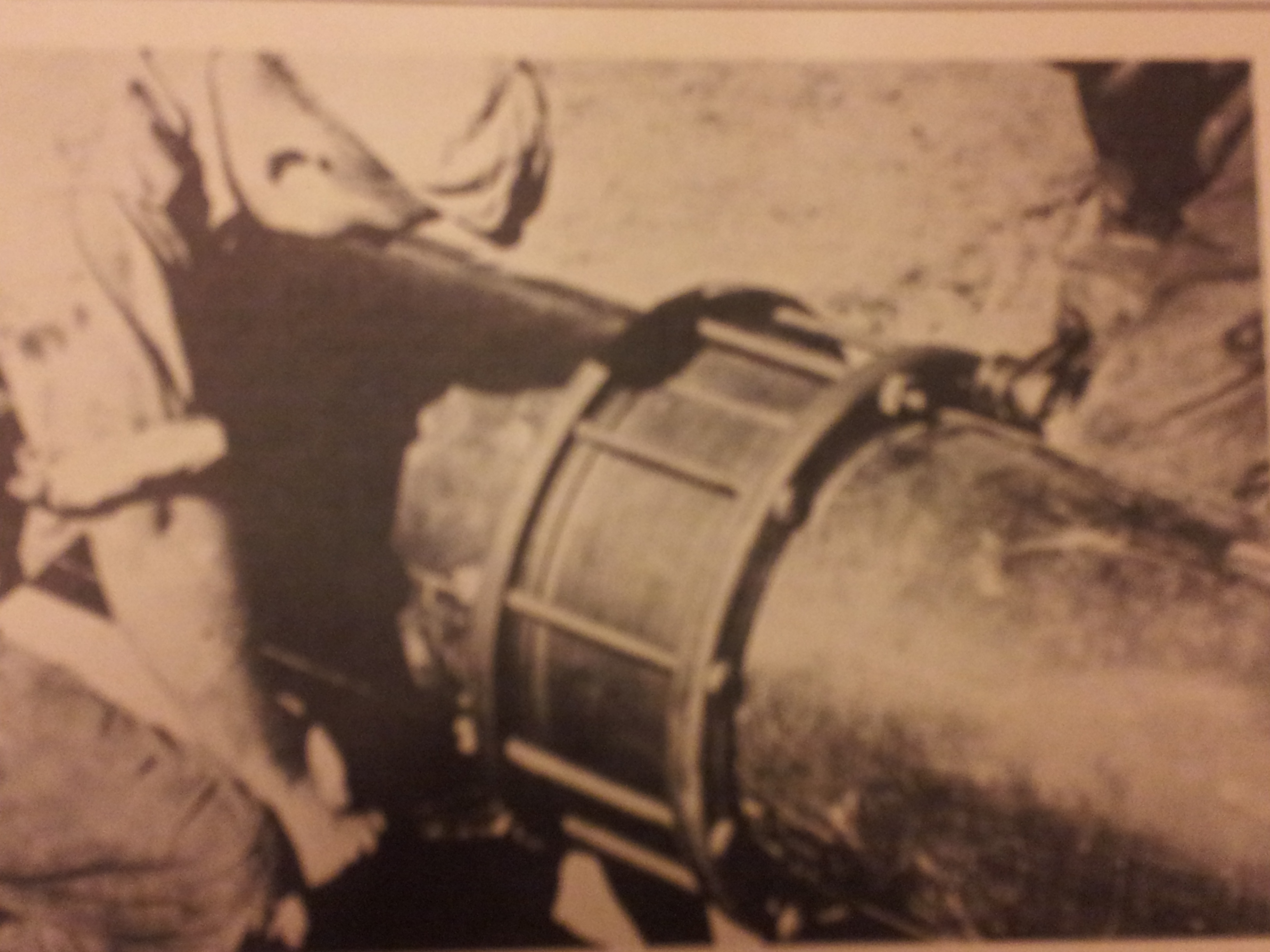
CIG Dresser coupling

The original pipeline was 20-22 inches in diameter, five hundred miles long, trenched by ditching machines but some portions dug by hand, linked by Dresser coupling rather than welded, and limited to 50 psi. The Bivins Compressor Station, using three Worthington Corporation compressors of 1000 HP each, was the first soon followed by Clayton and Devine and the introduction of electric welding.

In 1938, CIG has 633 miles of pipeline and 145 employees.

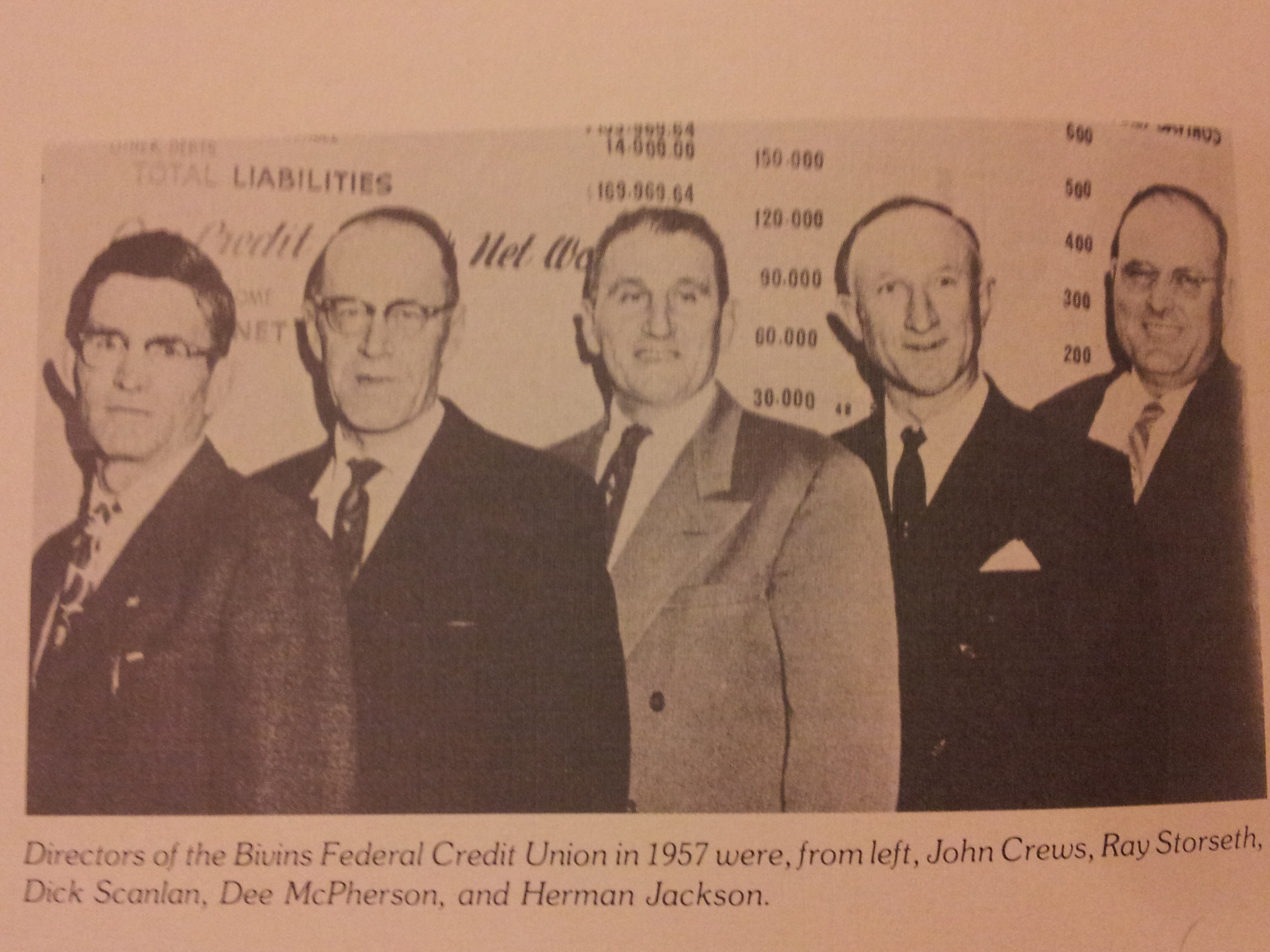
CIG Bivins Federal Credit Union Directors in 1957, left to right, John Crews, Ray Storseth, Dick Scanlan, Dee McPherson, and Herman Jackson

Corporate headquarters were in Colorado Springs and the company introduced a group life insurance program and a death benefit plan in the early 1930s, followed by a retirement income plan in 1939, a medical plan in 1940, and a credit union The Cimarron Station came on line in 1941, followed by the Apishipa Station in 1943. The McClintock Station was operational in 1944 followed by the East Denver and Lakin Stations in 1947, the latter connecting Denver to the Hugoton Gas Field. The company was using shortwave radio communication and airplane pipeline patrols by 1948. The Kit Carson Station was online by the end of the decade.

In 1951, The Canadian River Gas Company merged with CIG, and the Fourway Station came online in 1952. The Springfield, Keyes, Sanford and Morton Compressor Stations came online in 1953. In 1957, the Mocane and Laverne stations came online.

In 1958, CIG has 3470 miles of pipeline and 951 employees.

In 1960, the company opened the Rawlins Compressor Station and introduced an employee Thrift Plan.

CIG changes its name to CIC to reflect its four major businesses, Pipeline, Chemical (Wycon), Petroleum and Manufacturing (Marsh acquired in 1956, Metal Forge and DeZunk acquired in the early 70's).

In 1972, CIG merged with Coastal States Gas Corporation. CIG's deepest wildcat, Johnson #1, drilled in the Texas Panhandle at 14,000 feet.

In 1976, CIC changes its name back to CIG (Manufacturing division was sold to General Signal Corp. in 1972).

In 1978, CIG has 5185 miles of pipeline and 1142 employees.

Coastal merged with El Paso Corp. in 1999, which was bought by Kinder Morgan in 2012.

== Presidents ==
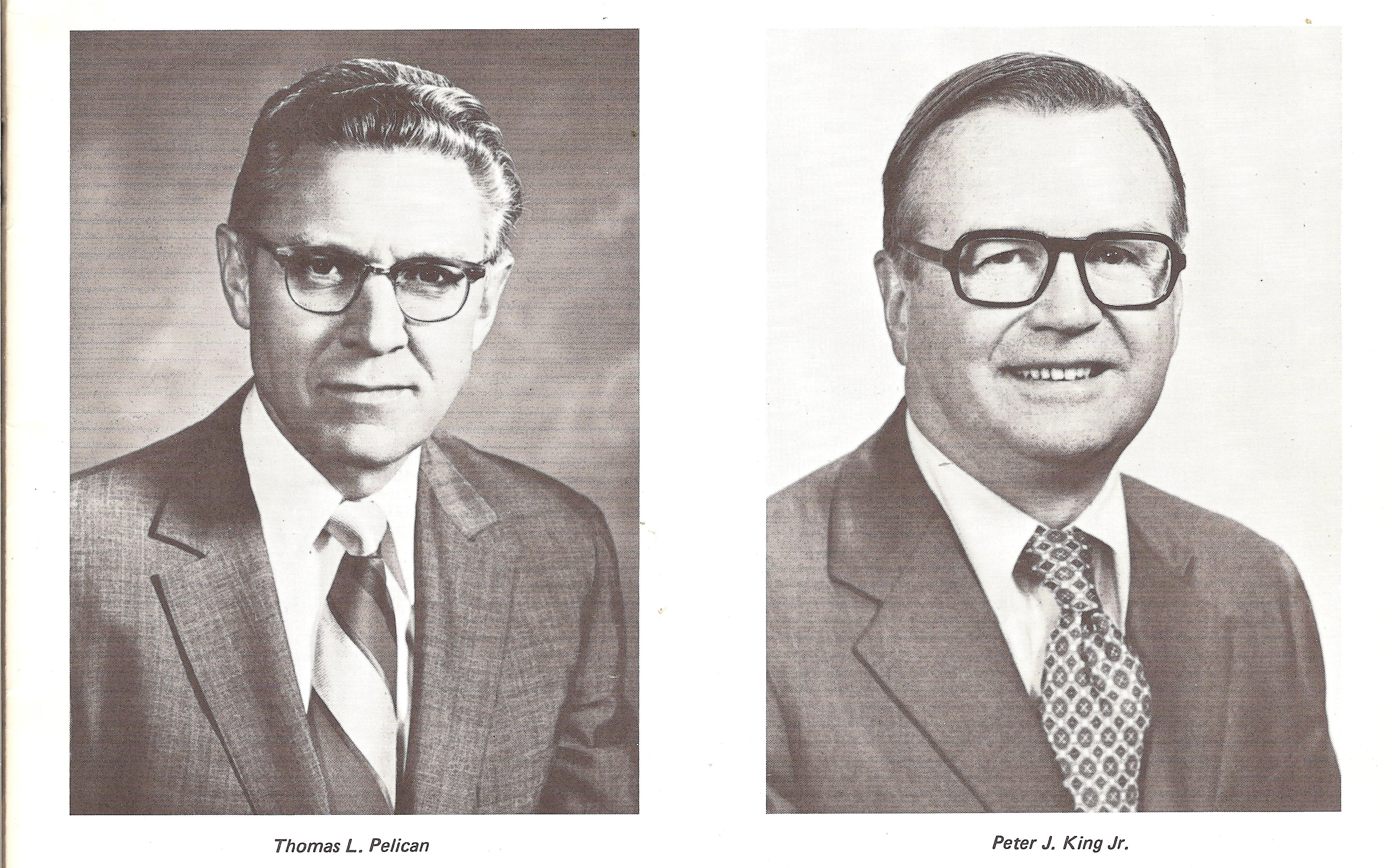
CIG presidents Pelican and King

1927-1933: Christy Payne

1933-1934: R.W. Gallagher

1934-1939: H.C. Cooper

1939-1943: F.H. Lerch Jr.

1943-1953: Robert W. Hendee

1954-1973: W.E. Mueller

1973-1976: Thomas L. Pelican

1977-: Peter J. King Jr.

== Gallery ==
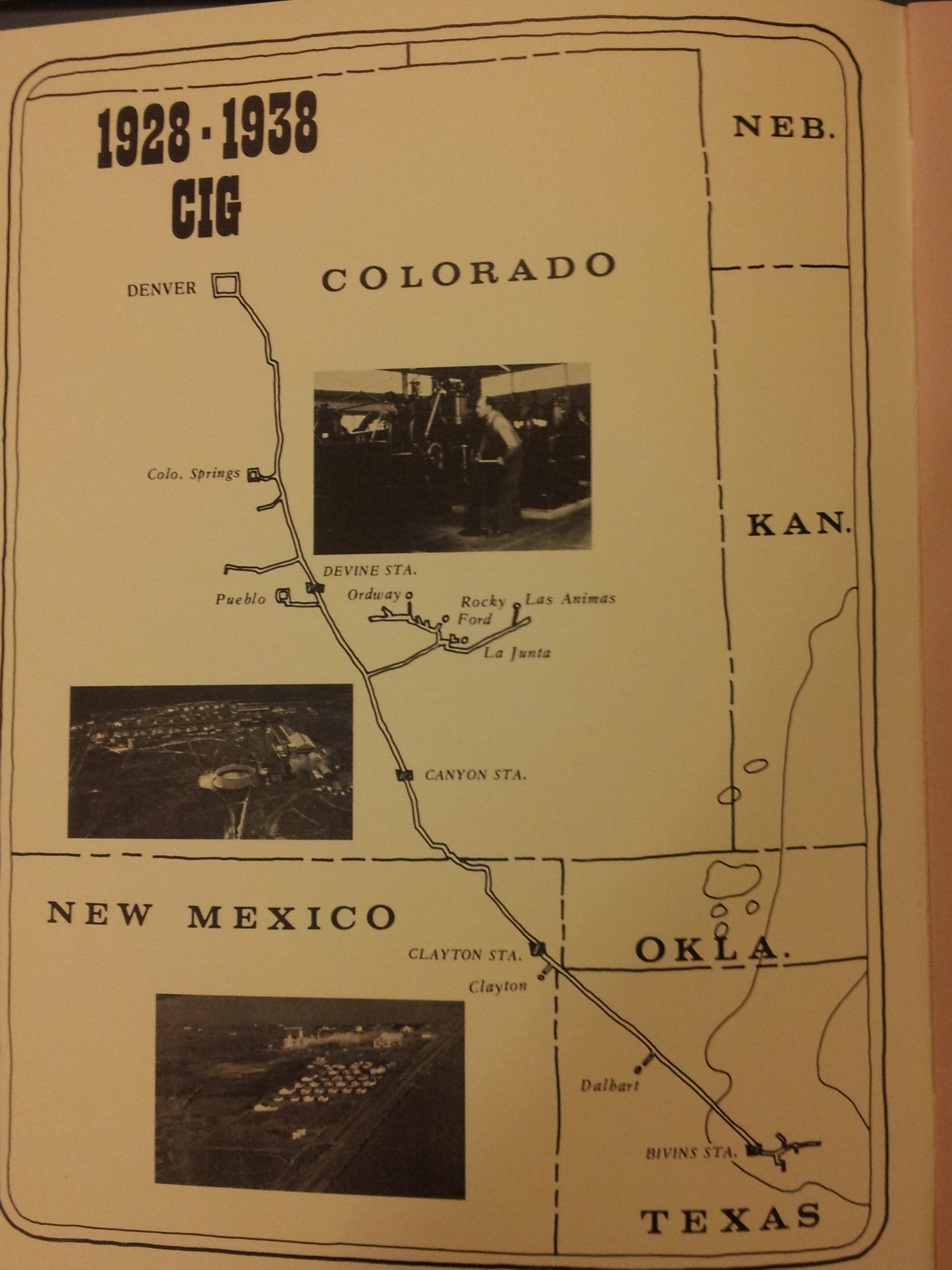
CIG operations 1928-1938

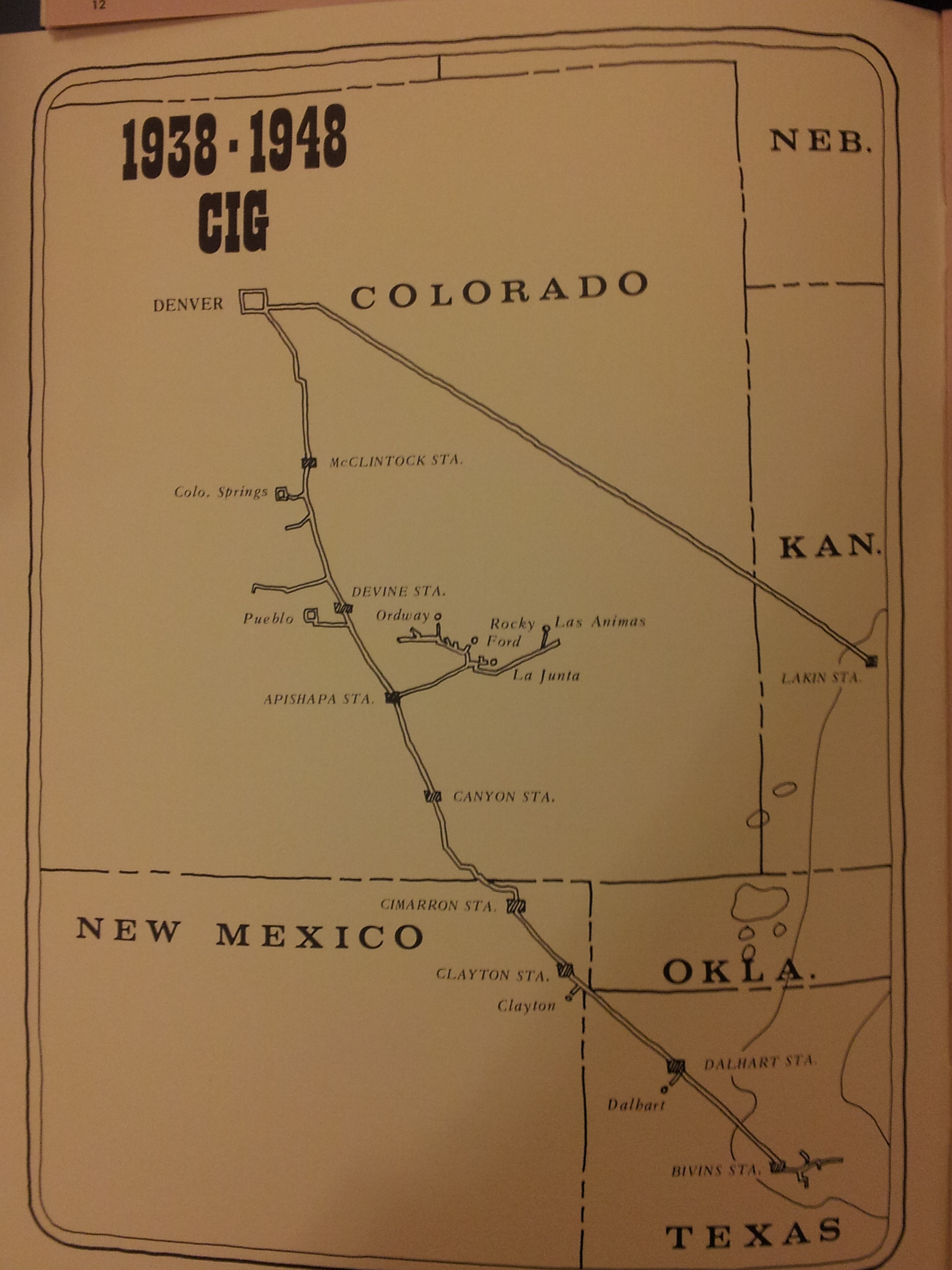
CIG operations 1938-1948

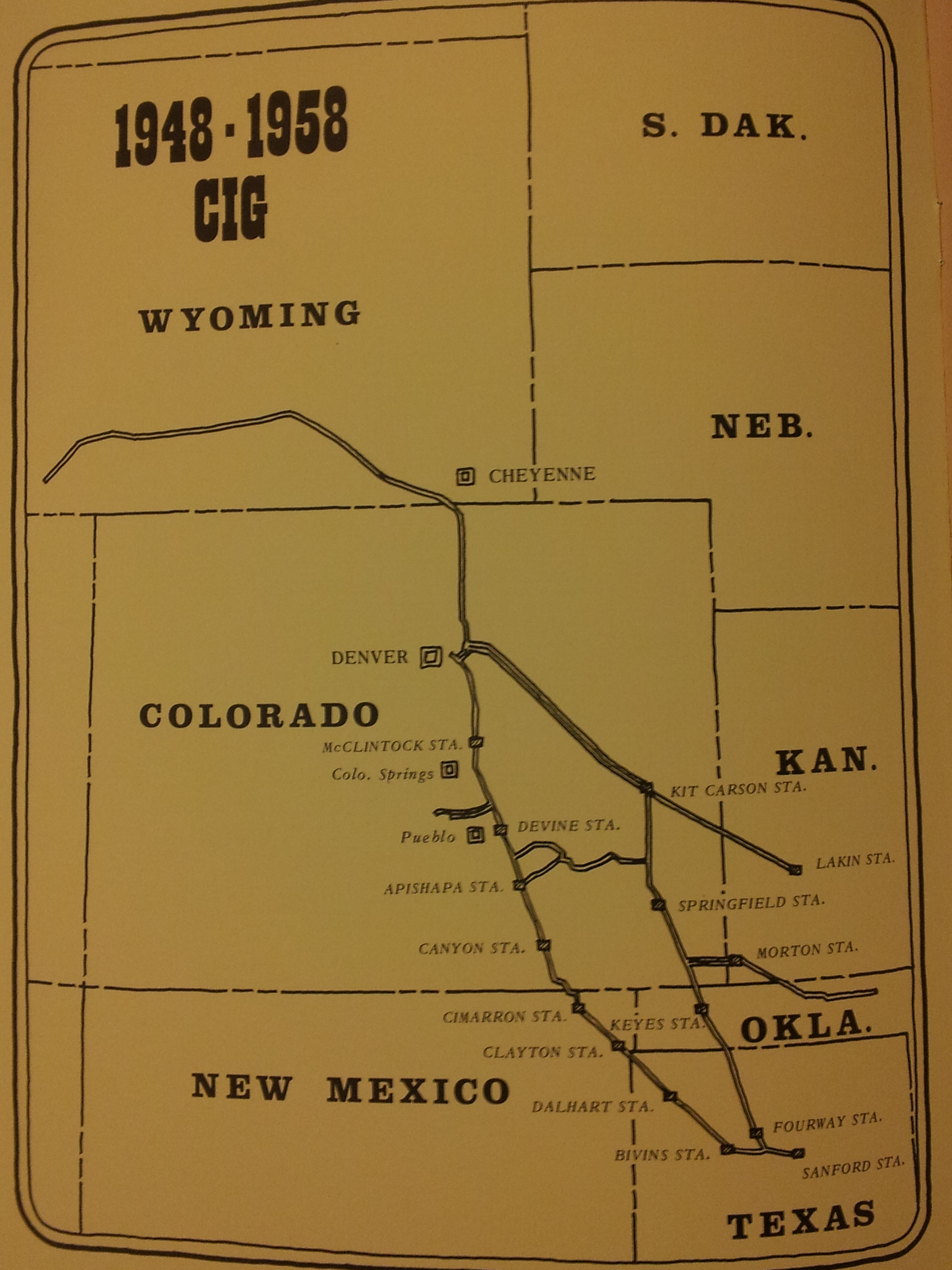
CIG operations 1948-1958

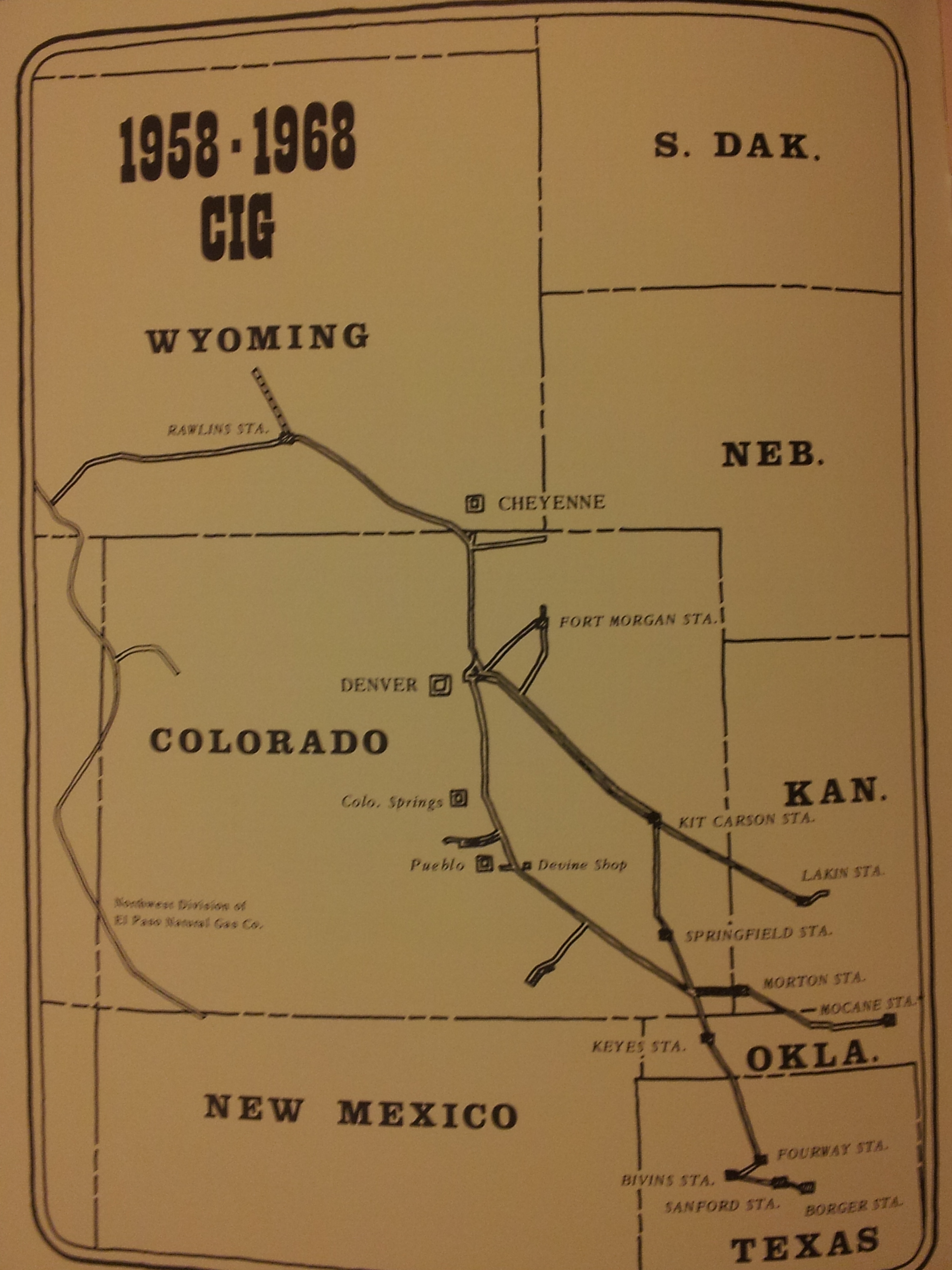
CIG operations 1958-1968

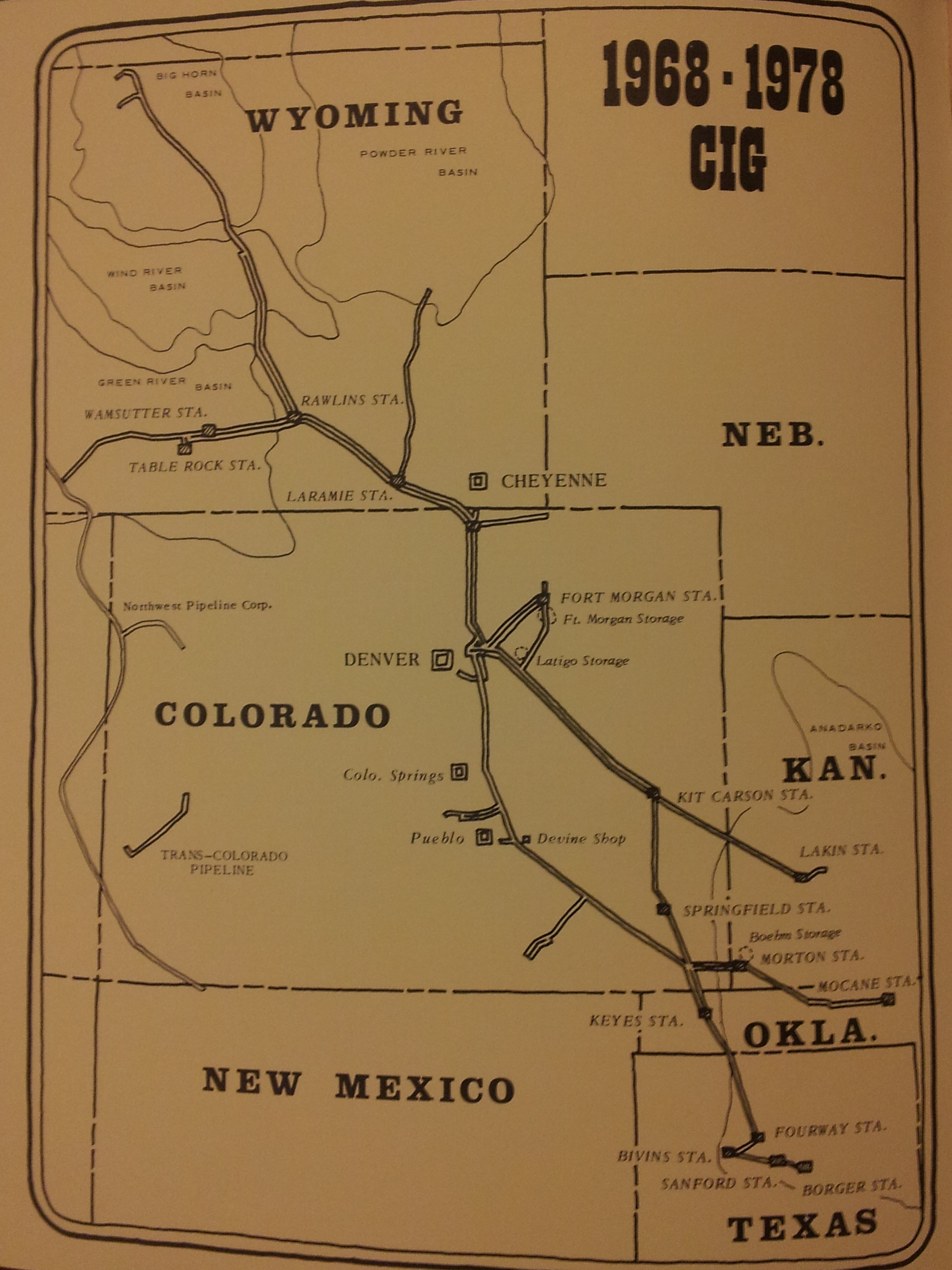
CIG operations 1968-1978

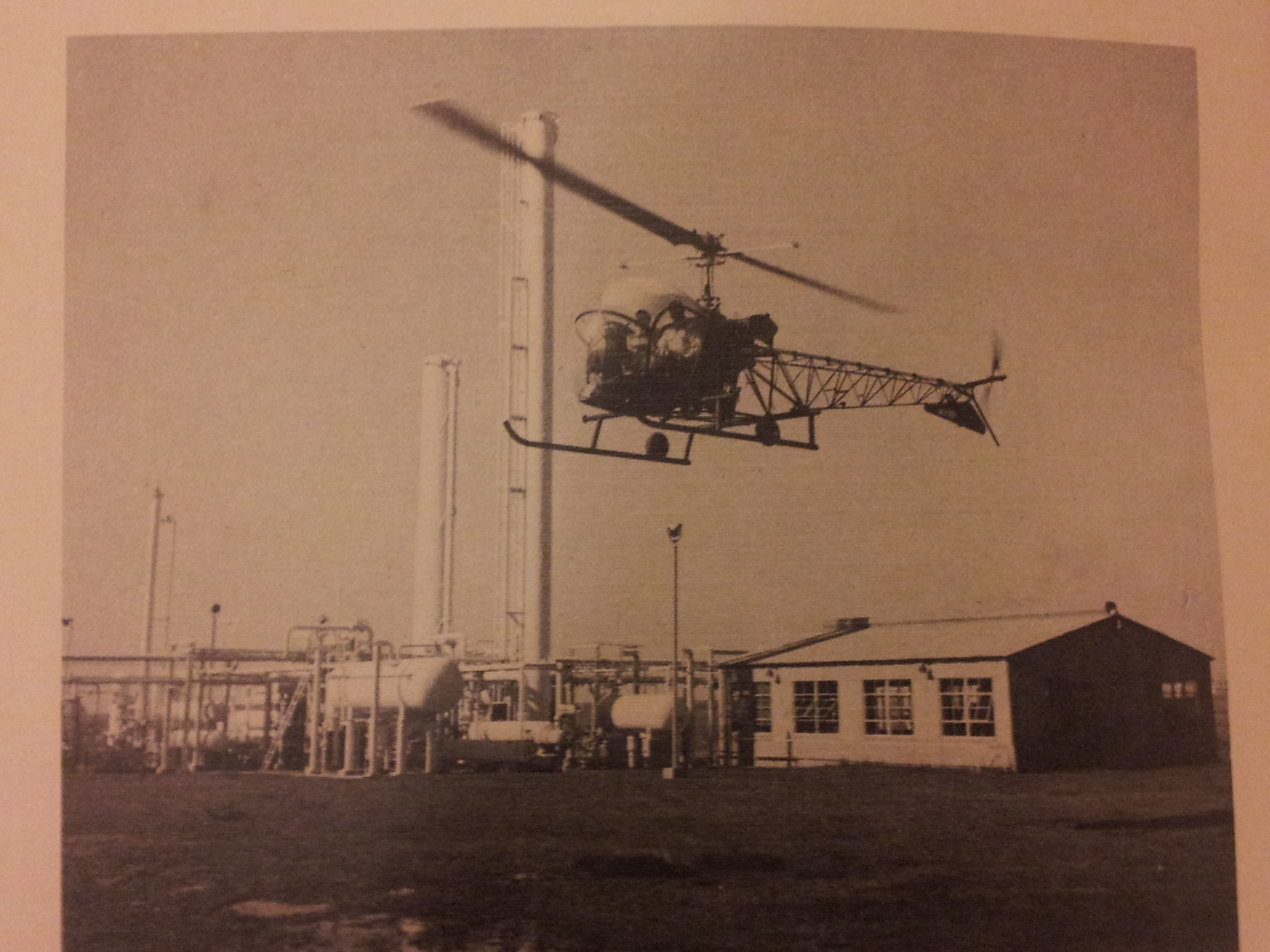
CIG started using Bell 47 helicopters in 1953 for chart readers access to and from the gas wells

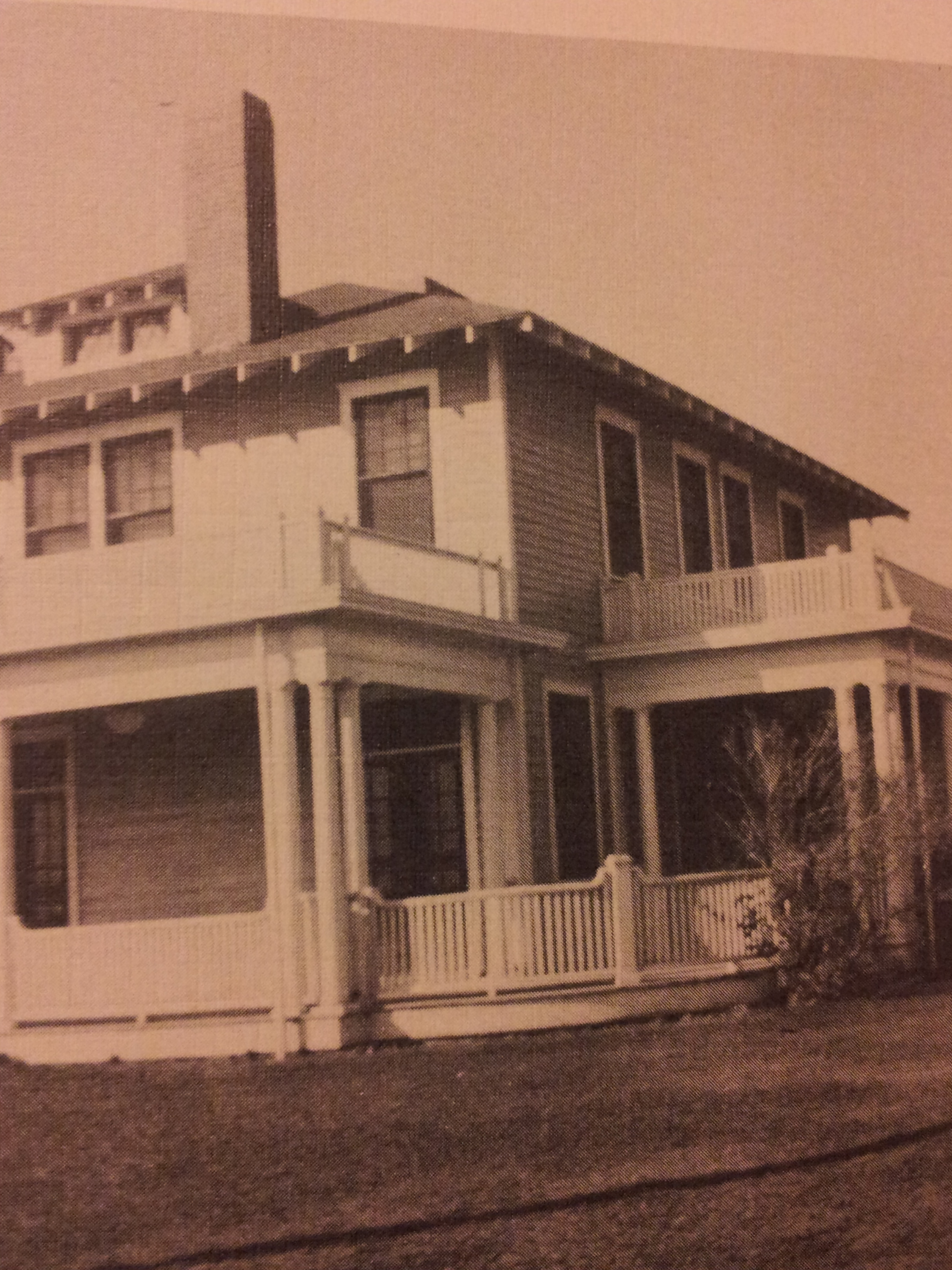
CIG Bivins Station Hotel

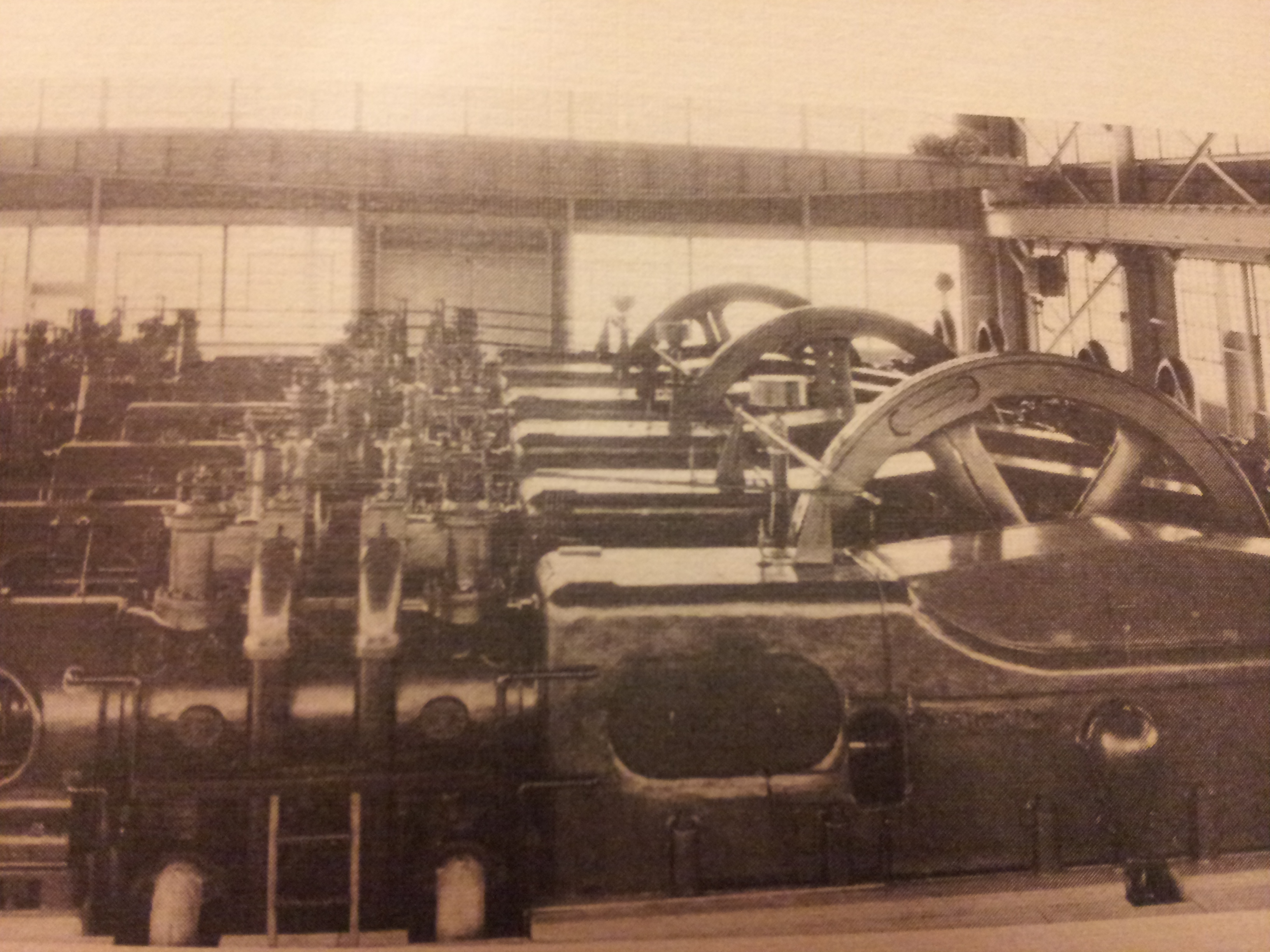
Three CIG Worthington Compressors, 1000 HP each
