= Destin Pipeline =

North American natural gas pipeline

Destin Pipeline is a natural gas pipeline that gathers gas from the Gulf of Mexico and brings it into Mississippi. It is owned by BP and Enbridge. Its FERC code is 164.

== See also ==
- Horizon Pipeline
