= Crossroads Pipeline Company =

Crossroads Pipeline Company is a natural gas pipeline that brings gas from Indiana to Ohio. It is owned by TransCanada. Its FERC code is 123.
