= Southern Star Central Gas Pipeline =

Southern Star Central Gas Pipeline, Inc
- Company type: Private
- Founded: 1904
- Headquarters: Owensboro, KY, U.S.A.
- Products: Natural Gas Pipeline
- Parent: Caisse de dépôt
- Website: www.southernstar.com

Southern Star Central Gas Pipeline, Inc, headquartered in Owensboro, Kentucky, is a natural gas transmission system spanning approximately 6,000 miles (9,700 km) in the Midwest and Mid-continent regions of the United States. Southern Star's employees and its pipeline system and facilities are located throughout Kansas, Oklahoma, Missouri, Wyoming, Colorado, Texas, Nebraska, and Kentucky. It serves major markets such as St. Louis, Wichita, and Kansas City. Southern Star is a locally managed, private company owned by Caisse de dépôt et placement du Québec and Ullico, Inc. The company is more commonly referred to as Southern Star. The company's FERC code is 43.

== History ==
The company was formed in 1904. In 1926, it was renamed Cities Service Gas Company. It was again renamed in 1982 to the Northwest Central Pipeline Corporation. Five years later it took the name Williams Natural Gas Company. In 1997, it was reorganized and called the Williams Gas Pipeline Central, Inc. In 2003, it was renamed Southern Star Central Gas Pipeline, Inc.

== Pipeline statistics ==
- System Design Capacity 2.4 billion cubic feet (68 million cubic meters) per day
- Seasonal Storage 46.7 billion ft^{3} (1.32 billion m^{3})
- Annual Throughput 438.3 billion ft^{3} (12.41 billion m^{3})
- Supply Areas Midcontinent, Rockies
- Market Areas Kansas, Oklahoma, Nebraska, Missouri, Wyoming, Colorado, Texas
- Miles of Pipeline Approx 5,800
- Compressor Stations 43
- Horsepower 219,579
- Gas Storage Fields 8
- Pipeline Connections 34 (11 Delivery, 17 Receipt, 7 Bi-directional)

=== Central Pipeline ===
Southern Star's Central Pipeline brings gas from the Rocky Mountains, Texas, and Oklahoma to Kansas. From there it goes east to Missouri.
