= Gulfstream Natural Gas Pipeline =

Gulfstream Natural Gas Pipeline is a natural gas pipeline that brings gas from Mississippi and Alabama, underwater across the Gulf of Mexico, to Florida. It was owned by Duke Energy, but is now owned by Enbridge and Williams. Its FERC code is 183.

== See also ==
- Florida Gas Transmission Pipeline
