= Southern Natural Gas =

Southern Natural Gas Company
- Company type: Joint Venture; 50% Kinder Morgan; 50% Southern Company
- Industry: Natural Gas
- Founded: 1928
- Headquarters: Birmingham, Alabama, USA
- Key people: James C. Yardley, Chairman and President; Norman G. Holmes, Chief Operating Officer
- Products: Natural Gas Transmission
- Revenue: ▲$528 million USD (2007)
- Number of employees: 480 (2007)

Southern Natural Gas Company, headquartered in Birmingham, Alabama, is a natural gas pipeline company that was founded in 1928 and is currently a joint venture between Kinder Morgan and Southern Company. The company was a division of Birmingham-based Sonat Inc. until 1999 when Sonat and El Paso Corporation merged. El Paso was acquired by Kinder Morgan in 2012.

== Description ==
Southern Natural Gas (SNG) is an approximately 6,900-mile pipeline system extending from natural gas supply basins in Louisiana, Mississippi and Alabama, to market areas in Louisiana, Mississippi, Alabama, Florida, Georgia, South Carolina and Tennessee, including the metropolitan areas of Atlanta and Birmingham.

== Service Areas ==
SNG is a principal natural gas transporter to southeastern markets in Alabama, Georgia and South Carolina, which are some of the fastest growing natural gas demand regions in the United States. The SNG system is also connected to Southern LNG's Elba Island LNG terminal near Savannah, Georgia.

== See also ==
- Sonat Inc.
- El Paso Corporation
- Kinder Morgan
- Sea Robin Pipeline
