= Vector Pipeline =

Vector Pipeline L.P. is a 348-mile-long natural gas pipeline which transports approximately 1 billion cubic feet (28,000,000 m^{3}) per day of natural gas from Joliet, Illinois, in the Chicago area, to parts of Indiana and Michigan and into Ontario, Canada. The pipeline is important in the supply and transportation of natural gas from the United States and Western Canada to the Midwest, eastern Canada and the northeastern United States, supplying power generation plants, natural gas distribution companies, and natural gas storage facilities. The pipeline also has interconnections with several other natural gas pipelines along its route.

Vector Pipeline L.P. is a joint venture between Calgary-based Enbridge Inc. (TSX: ENB NYSE: ENB) and Detroit-based DTE Energy Company(NYSE: DTE). Vector Pipeline filed applications with the U.S. Federal Energy Regulatory Commission and the Canadian National Energy Board in late 1997. Construction of the pipeline took place during 2000 and Vector began operations Dec. 1, 2000. Its FERC code is 175. Duke Energy acquired a 30% stake in the pipeline in 2002 when it bought Westcoast Energy Inc.; it sold its interest in September 2003 to DTE and Enbridge, who already owned the other 70%, for $145 million. Enbridge provides operating services to Vector and owns a 60% stake.
