= Bissingen, Bavaria =

- Municipality
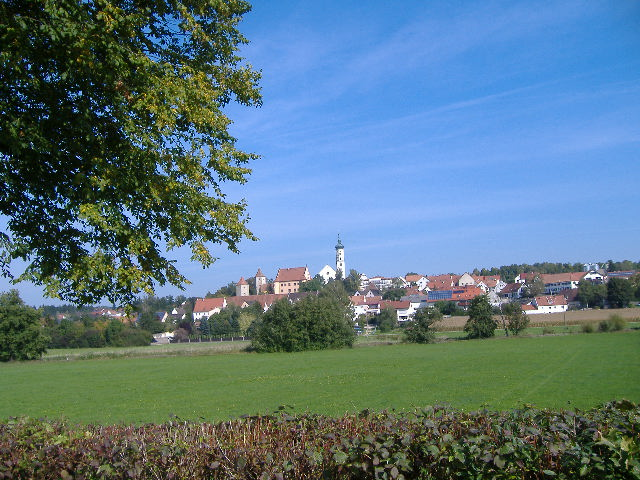
- Panorama of Bissingen

- Coat of arms

- Location of Bissingen, Bavaria within Dillingen district
- Interactive map of Bissingen, Bavaria
- Location within Germany Location within Bavaria
- Coordinates: 48°43′N 10°37′E
- Country: Germany
- State: Bavaria
- Admin. region: Schwaben
- District: Dillingen

Government
  - Mayor (2019–25): Stephan Herreiner

Area
  - Total: 64.2 km^{2} (24.8 sq mi)
- Elevation: 454 m (1,490 ft)

Population (2025-12-31)
  - Total: 3,647
  - Density: 56.8/km^{2} (147/sq mi)
- Time zone: UTC+01:00 (CET)
  - Summer (DST): UTC+02:00 (CEST)
- Postal codes: 86657
- Dialling codes: 09084
- Vehicle registration: DLG
- Website: www.bissingen.de

Bissingen (German pronunciation: [ˈbɪsɪŋən]) is a municipality in the district of Dillingen in Bavaria in Germany.
