= Horizon Pipeline =

Natural gas pipeline in Illinois, US

Location
- Country: United States
- State: Illinois
- Start: Joliet
- Passes through: DuPage, Kane, Cook, McHenry counties
- To: Northern Illinois near Wisconsin border

General information
- Type: natural gas
- Owner: Horizon Pipeline Company LLC
- Partners: Natural Gas Pipeline Company of America, Nicor
- Construction started: 2001
- Commissioned: 2002

Technical information
- Length: 73 mi (117 km)
- Maximum discharge: 3.7 billion cubic meter per year
- Diameter: 36 in (914 mm)

Horizon Pipeline is a natural gas pipeline in northern Illinois, United States. Its FERC code is 178.

The pipeline is owned and operated by Horizon Pipeline Company LLC, a joint venture of the Natural Gas Pipeline Company of America (NGPL), owned by Kinder Morgan Energy Partners, and Nicor. It carries natural gas from the NGPL's interstate natural gas pipeline system Chicago supply hub near Joliet into NGPL's and Nicor Gas distribution systems in northern Illinois near Wisconsin border. The pipeline is 73 miles (117 km) long and has a diameter of 36 inches (910 mm) with capacity of 3.7 billion cubic meter of natural gas per year. It is designed to operate at a maximum operating pressure of 800 pounds per square inch (5,500 kPa). It consists of a 27-mile (43 km) segment of new pipeline built in 2001–2002, and 46-mile (74 km) long lease of existing pipeline from NGPL.

The environmental impact assessment of the pipeline was completed in May 2001. The pipeline became operational on 11 May 2002.
