= Panhandle Eastern =

Panhandle Eastern Pipe Line Company, LP is an approximately 6,300-mile natural gas interstate pipeline system in the United States that brings natural gas from the panhandle region of Oklahoma east through the Midwest to supply Indiana and Ohio. It is owned by Energy Transfer, and operated by Panhandle Eastern Pipe Line Company, LP.--a wholly owned subsidiary of Energy Transfer. Its FERC code is 28.

== History & Ownership ==
When Panhandle Eastern Pipe Line incorporated in 1929 as Interstate Pipe Company, the entity started with 860 miles of line. At the time, Panhandle Eastern served 110 utility distributors in a market of 22 million people in 12 states.

In 1989, Panhandle Eastern Pipe Line Company bought Texas Eastern Transmission for $3.2 billion and became PanEnergy. Eight years later, Duke Power Company purchased PanEnergy and formed Duke Energy. In March 1999, CMS Energy acquired Panhandle Eastern Pipe Line and its principal subsidiaries, Trunkline and Pan Gas Storage, as well as Panhandle Eastern Pipe Line affiliates, Trunkline LNG and Panhandle Storage, from subsidiaries of Duke Energy. Immediately following the acquisition, Trunkline LNG and Panhandle Storage became wholly owned subsidiaries of Panhandle Eastern Pipe Line.

In June 2003, Southern Union completed its acquisition of Panhandle Eastern Pipe Line Company and its subsidiaries (collectively, "Panhandle Energy") from CMS Energy. Currently Southern Union Panhandle LLC, an indirect wholly-owned subsidiary of Energy Transfer, owns a 1% general partner interest in Panhandle Eastern Pipeline Co and Energy Transfer Operating, L.P indirectly owns a 99% limited partner interest in PEPL.
