= Southern Trails Pipeline =

The Southern Trails Pipeline is a 16-inch-diameter steel natural gas pipeline which brings gas from the San Juan Basin to southern California, United States. It has a 487-mile eastern branch in New Mexico and a 210-mile western branch in California. Its FERC code is 182.

== History ==
The pipeline was constructed in 2002 by Questar at a cost of $100 million.

Dominion Energy acquired Questar in 2016.

In 2017, the Navajo Tribal Utility Authority took over the eastern portion of the pipeline.

In May 2018, Dominion Energy received approval to abandon the pipeline, which was not profitable amid unfavorable market conditions and competition. The pipeline is projected to be abandoned by 2022.
