= Florida Gas Transmission =

Natural gas pipeline in the United States

Florida Gas Transmission is an approximately 5,380-mile natural gas pipeline which brings gas from Texas, Louisiana, Mississippi, and Alabama into Florida. The pipeline is owned 50% by Energy Transfer Partners (Owner/Operator) and 50% by Kinder Morgan Partnership, each respectively representing units in Citrus Corporation (CitCor). Its FERC code is 34.

Florida Gas Transmission (FGT) is the principal transporter of natural gas to the Florida energy market, delivering over 60% of the natural gas consumed in the state. In addition, FGT’s pipeline system operates and maintains multiple interconnects with major interstate and intrastate natural gas pipelines, which provide customers access to diverse natural gas producing regions.

Customers include electric utilities, independent power producers, industrial end-users and local distribution companies. Major clients include Florida Power & Light Company, Peoples Gas System Inc., and Angola LNG Supply Services.

== See also ==
- GulfStream Natural Gas
