= El Paso Corp. =

American natural gas and energy company

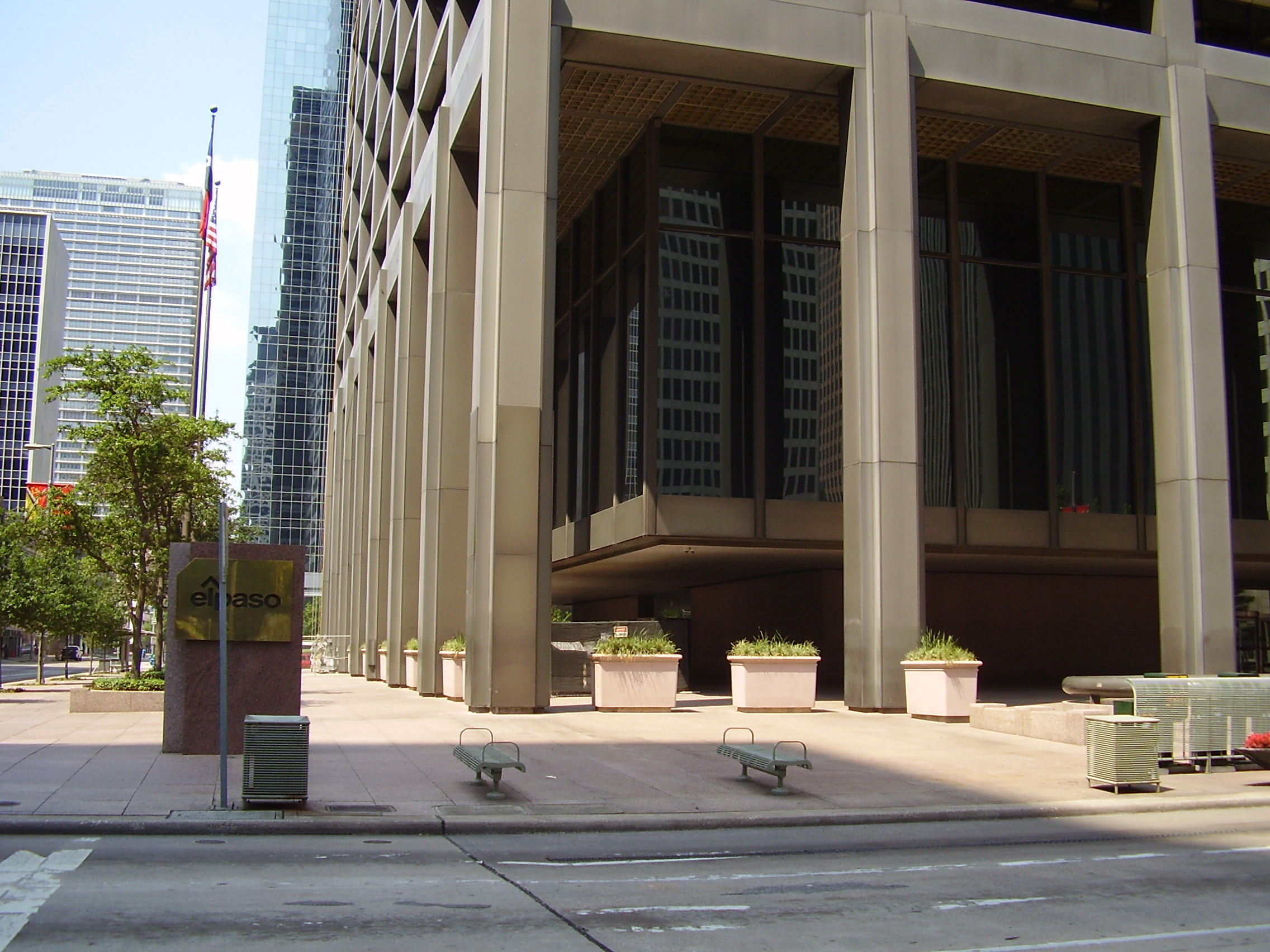
El Paso Corp. headquarters

El Paso Corporation was a provider of natural gas and related energy products and was one of North America's largest natural gas producers until its acquisition by Kinder Morgan in 2012. It was headquartered in Houston, Texas, United States.

Prior to the takeover by Kinder Morgan, the company owned North America's largest natural gas pipeline system which traveled from border-to-border and coast-to-coast. The pipeline system included Colorado Interstate Gas; El Paso Natural Gas; Southern Natural Gas; Tennessee Gas Pipeline; Cheyenne Plains Pipeline; Mojave Pipeline; Elba Express Pipeline; Young Gas Storage; Wyoming Interstate Company; and Ruby Pipeline. The El Paso Corporation also owned fifty percent of Great Lakes Transmission and Florida Gas Transmission and employed 6,000 people. Florida Gas is part of Southern Natural Gas. In 1999 the company doubled in size when it merged with Birmingham, Alabama based natural gas giant Sonat. It went on to acquire Coastal Corporation in 2001.

The company's major offices were located in Houston, Texas; Birmingham, Alabama; and Colorado Springs, Colorado. The company's CEO at the time of sale to Kinder Morgan was Douglas L. Foshee.

== History ==
Source: The Pipeliners: The Story of El Paso Natural Gas, by Frank J Mangan, January 1, 1978, ISBN 978-0930208066

The company was founded in 1928 by Houston partners attorney Paul Kayser and H. Gordon Frost Sr. [(cattleman/rancher)], who identified the city of El Paso, Texas as a good market for natural gas transported by pipeline from Jal, New Mexico.They started with one employee, H. Gordon's wife Nell Streeter Frost ([secretary)] (not including the two principals), a tiny office, and a telephone. It was the world's first natural gas pipeline company.

El Paso owned, operated and developed the first in the world and one of the largest natural gas transmission systems in North America. Its more than 17,000 miles of pipeline connected major gas supply regions throughout the American West and Mexico in the early 1990s and supplied about seven percent of U.S. natural gas demand. In 1992, El Paso was spun off from Burlington Resources, which had operated the company as a subsidiary since 1983.

Paul Kayser, a young Houston attorney, and H. Gordon Frost Sr., 2nd generation Texas brahman cattle rancher, founded El Paso Natural Gas in 1928. In 1929, they obtained a franchise from the El Paso City Council to sell natural gas to the city. He proposed construction of a 200-mile pipeline that linked El Paso with natural gas wells located near the city of Jal, New Mexico. After obtaining financing for the ambitious project, they immediately began hiring work crews and securing equipment and supplies.

Pipeline construction methods at the time were crude in comparison to techniques developed during the mid-1900s. The lines were built by hand and the men who worked on the lines had to be extremely tough. Difficulties related to building Frost and Kayser's pipeline were amplified by the fact that his pipes would cross some of the most difficult terrain in the southwestern United States. The pipeline had to cross 200 miles of rivers, mountains, and deserts and it had to be built to withstand all types of natural disasters. Although the work was tedious and time-consuming, Frost's and Kayser's crews pioneered new methods of welding, ditching, and crossing unique terrain. The line was finished and put into service in 1930.

Unfortunately for them and their fledgling start-up, the Great Depression began shortly after the building of the pipeline. El Paso generated profits of $283,000 during the pipeline's first year of operation but the Depression-era economy threatened to quash the venture. Fortunately, the city of El Paso continued to buy Frost's and Kayser's gas. The company was able to pay its debts and to expand its pipeline system during the early 1930s. The company built new lines extending to the copper mining areas of southern Arizona and northern Mexico and in 1934 extended service to Tucson and Phoenix, Arizona.

During the late 1930s, El Paso enjoyed steady growth. It built new pipeline systems extending throughout the oil- and gas-rich Permian Basin in south Texas and extended lines north and west to accommodate growing regional demand. By the late 1930s, the company was generating revenue of about $5 million annually and was beginning to post strong profit gains. Expansion slowed during World War II as the nation's labor and resources were steered toward the war effort. Following the war, El Paso benefitted from strong demand for natural gas in the growing southwestern United States. As the postwar economy and population boomed, cities throughout the region demanded energy sources to fuel growth and development.

El Paso experienced explosive growth in the late 1940s. Gains during that period were due in part to the completion of a 700-mile pipeline reaching from El Paso's Permian Basin operations to California. El Paso began supplying gas through a 26-inch pipeline and also began construction of new, larger pipelines aimed at the burgeoning California market. As a result of those efforts, El Paso's assets rose from about $23.5 million in 1945 to $285 million in 1950. Meanwhile, sales increased from $9 million to $41 million and net income climbed to a record $9 million in 1950.

During the early 1950s, El Paso continued to post steady gains as demand for its natural gas increased. It built or purchased pipes reaching as far north as Ignacio, a small town in southern Colorado, and continued its westward expansion, bolstering its feeder pipes going to California and increasing sales throughout Arizona and New Mexico. By 1955, El Paso captured nearly $30 million in profits annually from about $180 million in sales. By the early 1960s, those figures had risen to more than $40 million and $400 million, respectively.

El Paso's big gains during the late 1950s were partially attributed to its 1957 acquisition of part of the operations of Pacific Northwest Pipeline Corporation. The acquisition gave El Paso a presence in several western and northwestern states, with pipelines reaching as far as Washington and connecting to other companies' networks in Canada. In addition to geographic expansion, El Paso began to diversify during the 1950s into related oil and chemical businesses. It created El Paso Products Company as a subsidiary to manufacture chemicals from natural gas derivatives. Despite forays into other industries, El Paso remained focused on buying, transporting, and selling natural gas.

After 35 years, El Paso's founder left his chief executive duties during the early 1960s. The company's president, Howard Boyd, replaced Kayser. Kayser had transformed his company from a tiny start-up supplier with 200 miles of pipeline to a $500 million corporation with 20,000 miles of pipe delivering gas throughout the western United States. Throughout his reign, he remained committed to the pragmatic development of natural resources and sound business practices. "There is nothing more vital to our economy than the orderly, wise, and free use of our precious natural resources developed under practical, intelligent conservation policies," Kayser stated in 1954.

El Paso continued to grow at a rapid pace during the late 1960s and early 1970s. Although natural gas industry profits were generally cyclical, El Paso's overall sales and earnings grew during the period. By the early 1970s, El Paso operated one of the nation's largest pipeline systems. It stretched from northern Mexico to the northeast tip of Washington, with extensions throughout the Southwest and reaching into Wyoming, Idaho, and Oregon.

Although federal regulators kept El Paso from operating its own pipes in specified regions, its lines connected with those of other operators to give El Paso access to markets in California, Kansas, Oklahoma, and Nevada. Partly in an effort to minimize its exposure to cyclical gas markets, El Paso diversified during the late 1960s and 1970s. By 1974, non-gas operations contributed about one-third of El Paso's annual $1.3 billion in revenues. The company's largest non-gas division was its petrochemical business, which manufactured a variety of chemicals used in the growing synthetics industry. El Paso also became heavily involved in the fiber and textile industries, particularly nylon, rayon, and other synthetics. Other of El Paso's subsidiaries were involved with mining, gas and oil exploration, insurance, copper wire, and real estate development.

One of El Paso's most intriguing and promising ventures during the 1970s was a venture into liquefied natural gas. In 1969, El Paso reached what it termed a "historic agreement" with Sonatrach, an Algerian national oil and gas company. Under the arrangement, the Algerian company would deliver a billion cubic feet of natural gas in liquid form daily to El Paso Natural Gas. El Paso would then distribute the low-cost gas through its pipeline network. The ambitious project required the construction of a nine-ship fleet of special tankers to be owned and operated by El Paso, as well as the construction of storage terminals on the East Coast and in Algeria. El Paso moved 230 employees to Algeria for the project. Liquified gas deliveries commenced in 1978 and made a significant contribution to El Paso's bottom line.

Although El Paso's liquified gas venture represented an important success during the 1970s, its non-gas-related operations were generally less fruitful. El Paso jettisoned some of those operations and posted losses from major activities like chemical and fiber manufacturing. To make matters worse, El Paso was harmed by a Supreme Court decision in 1974. For several years, federal regulators had been trying to renege on their decision in the late 1950s to allow El Paso to acquire its northern operations. El Paso fought their efforts, but was defeated. In 1974, El Paso was forced to divest the holdings, effectively terminating its natural gas operations north of New Mexico and Arizona.

Despite some setbacks, El Paso managed to sustain long-term growth during the 1970s. Sales dipped following the 1974 divestiture but surged back up to $1.15 billion in 1975, rising to more than $2 billion in 1978. Earnings, however, fluctuated around $50 million to $60 million annually. El Paso's huge revenue gains during the late 1970s reflected turbulence in energy markets.

El Paso benefitted from the Natural Gas Policy Act which was passed in 1978. That act basically allowed El Paso to begin competing with other Texas companies for the purchase of natural gas reserves. El Paso greatly increased its reserves after the act was passed, building up a sizable reserve base near its Permian Basin pipeline operations as well as in other regions of the country. It simultaneously boosted its output capacity to meet the expected surge in demand during the 1980s.

As a result of strong natural gas markets and El Paso's increased output capacity, sales topped $2 billion in 1978, rose past $3 billion in 1980, and then increased to nearly $4 billion in 1981. In 1981, El Paso reported record earnings of $147 million. Unfortunately, El Paso's profit gains were short-lived. During the late 1970s and early 1980s, industry competitors had hustled to boost natural gas output capacity with expectations of strong demand. But a weak economy and a newfound emphasis on energy conservation slowed market growth. Supply outstripped demand in 1982 and natural gas prices dropped. Furthermore, El Paso's chemical businesses suffered major setbacks in 1982. Although El Paso's sales rose to $4.3 billion in 1982, its net income dropped to $53 million.

El Paso Natural Gas (EPNG) hired Richard S. Morris in 1973 as its General Counsel. He was active in the company’s project development work, including its Algerian LNG and Alaskan projects. Mr. Morris was eventually promoted to be President and CEO of EPNG, was an active member of the Board of Directors, and retired in 1989.

The El Paso Company, as it became known in the 1970s, ceased to exist as an independent corporation in 1983. The company was purchased by Burlington Northern Inc. and became a 100-percent-owned subsidiary. Burlington was a $9 billion conglomerate active in mineral development, timber and forest products, and rail carrier systems. Although El Paso was experiencing some problems at the time, Burlington viewed the company as an excellent complement to its existing mineral development operations.

The acquisition seemed like a good move, particularly in light of new federal legislation scheduled to take effect during the mid-1980s. The legislation had effectively deregulated certain aspects of the natural gas industry. Prior to the mid-1980s, El Paso, in accordance with the Natural Gas Act of 1938 and the Natural Gas Policy Act of 1978, was in the business of purchasing gas from other producers, transporting the gas, and then selling it to local distribution companies. Its business began to change in 1984. Federal legislation passed in 1984 had a tumultuous effect on prices, transportation, and contractual relationships between customers and suppliers. The net effect was that natural gas industries and markets became more competitive. As a result, El Paso shifted from merchant to distributor during the late 1980s and early 1990s. Rather than owning the natural gas it transported, it simply provided transportation services for a fee charged to the owners and/or buyers.

In the 1980s and early 1990s, El Paso prospered under Burlington's management. Over the next few years, Burlington spun off or sold several of El Paso's nonperforming divisions and streamlined the company's natural gas operations.

In the early 1990s, Burlington changed its business strategy. After shunning the natural gas exploration and production business for several years, it decided to shift its focus to take advantage of a projected upturn in natural gas prices. During the early 1990s, Burlington sold most of its subsidiaries and reinvested the proceeds into natural gas reserves.

Burlington completed the spin-off of El Paso Natural Gas Company on June 30, 1992. William A. Wise was selected to act as president and chief executive of the again-independent El Paso. The 45-year-old Wise had been with El Paso since 1970, working as an attorney and then serving in various management positions. Wise was credited with helping the company make a transition to transport services during the late 1980s and with helping to make El Paso a low-cost industry leader. When El Paso regained its independence, its pipeline consisted of a 20,000 mile network connecting three oil producing regions in Texas, Oklahoma, and New Mexico to buyers primarily in California, Arizona, New Mexico, and Texas. Sales during 1993, its first full year of operation, topped $900 million, about $90 million of which was net income.

El Paso was in a relatively strong position in its industry going into the mid-1990s. It was the largest supplier of natural gas to the state of California and had successfully changed from merchant to transporter in compliance with new (1992) federal regulations. But it was also facing obstacles. Most notably, the California gas market was becoming glutted, dampening profits in El Paso's most important region. Nevertheless, investors were enthusiastic about El Paso's chances, as evidenced by a doubling of the company's stock price between 1992 and early 1994. El Paso was pinning its long-term hopes on the rapidly expanding Mexican market, to which it had unsurpassed access. It was also engaged in an ambitious effort to vastly increase its access to the northern California natural gas market.

=== Coastal acquisition, legal troubles, and proxy fight ===
In 2001, El Paso bought Oscar Wyatt's Coastal Corporation, a diversified energy company. It owned oil refineries, gas stations, and marketed oil, natural gas, and electricity.

In 2003, Oscar Wyatt and other shareholders sued the El Paso Corporation for allegedly misrepresenting its intentions for Coastal assets prior to the merger in 2000. After the merger of Coastal and El Paso Corporation, the latter began divesting itself of Coastal assets beginning in 2001. El Paso needed the cash to repay the mounting debt it had acquired from following the same business model as Ken Lay's Enron. El Paso had heavily leveraged itself to fuel sales into new markets for electricity, and concealed mounting debt from its balance sheet by writing off the debt to offshore subsidiary companies. In June 2003 Oscar Wyatt, along with El Paso investor Selim Zilkha, initiated a proxy fight to gain control of the El Paso Corporation and to wrestle control of the remaining assets, which included natural gas pipelines, exploration, and production assets. Since the merging and disclosing of corporate malfeasance by El Paso management, Its stock had fallen 87% from its February 2001 high of $75 a share. El Paso had debts of $25 billion and was being sued by shareholders and investigated by state and federal regulators. On June 26 2003, El Paso agreed to pay $1.45 billion to settle the price gouging case.

In October 2011, Kinder Morgan acquired El Paso Corp. in a $21.1 billion deal.

== Criticism ==
=== Tax avoidance ===
In December 2011, the non-partisan organization Public Campaign criticized El Paso for spending $2.94 million on lobbying and not paying income taxes during 2008-2010, instead getting $41 million in income tax rebates, despite making a profit of $4.1 billion and increasing executive pay by 47%.

=== Price fixing ===
On 27 September 2002, the shares of the El Paso Corporation plunged after an administrative law judge at the Federal Energy Regulatory Commission ruled that the company helped illegally drive energy prices to record highs in California between 2000 and 2001 by manipulating gas supplies. El Paso gas trader Todd Geiger was prosecuted by the FERC for falsely making up 48 gas trades. El Paso is now out of the energy trading business.
