= Nord Stream 1 =

Natural gas pipeline between Russia and Germany

- Map of the Nord Stream 1 pipeline

Location
- Country: Russia; Germany
- Coordinates: 60.555521°N 28.065289°E; 54.151388°N 13.656218°E
- Direction: east–west–south
- Start: Vyborg, Russian Federation
- Passes through: Gulf of Finland and Baltic Sea
- To: Lubmin near Greifswald, Germany

General information
- Type: Natural gas
- Status: Inoperable
- Partners: Gazprom; Uniper; Wintershall Dea; Gasunie; Engie
- Operator: Nord Stream AG
- Pipe manufacturer: EUROPIPE; OMK; Sumitomo
- Pipe installer: Saipem
- Pipe layer: Castoro Sei
- Contractors: Rambøll; Environmental Resource Management; Marin Mätteknik; IfAÖ; PeterGaz; DOF Subsea; Intec Engineering; Tideway BV; Royal Boskalis; EUPEC PipeCoatings; Rolls-Royce plc; Dresser-Rand Group; Siirtec Nigi SPA
- Commissioned: 8 November 2011 (1st line); 8 October 2012 (2nd line)

Technical information
- Length: 1,222 km (759 mi)
- Maximum discharge: 55 billion m^{3}/a (1.9 trillion cu ft/a)
- Diameter: 1,220 mm (48 in)
- No. of compressor stations: 1
- Compressor stations: Portovaya
- Website: www.nord-stream.com

Nord Stream (German–English mixed expression for "North Stream 1"; Russian: Северный поток, romanized: Severny potok) is a pair of disused offshore natural gas pipelines in Europe that run under the Baltic Sea from Russia to Germany. It consists of the Nord Stream 1 (NS1) pipeline running from Vyborg in northwestern Russia, near Finland, and the Nord Stream 2 (NS2) pipeline running from Ust-Luga in northwestern Russia near Estonia. Both pipelines run to Lubmin in the northeastern German state of Mecklenburg-Vorpommern. Each pipeline contains two pipes, denoted A and B; each of the four pipes is approximately 1,200 kilometres (750 mi) long and with approximate diameters of 1,220 millimetres (48 in). The combined capacity of the four pipes is 110 billion cubic metres per annum (3.9 trillion cubic feet per annum) of natural gas.

The name "Nord Stream" sometimes refers to a larger pipeline network that includes the feeding onshore pipeline in Russia and additional connections in Western Europe. These Nord Stream projects have faced opposition from some Central and Eastern European countries, as well as the United States, due to concerns that the pipelines would increase Russia's influence in Europe and result in a reduction of transit fees for the use of existing pipelines in Central and Eastern European countries.

On 26 September 2022, the NS1 pipeline experienced multiple large pressure drops to almost zero, attributed to three as of yet unexplained underwater explosions in international waters, rendering three of their four pipes inoperable. The perpetrators' identities and the motives behind the sabotage remain debated despite three separate investigations by Denmark, Germany, and Sweden. On 18 November 2022, Swedish authorities announced that remains of explosives were found at the site of the leaks, and confirmed that the incident was the result of "gross sabotage", while Danish authorities used the phrase "deliberate actions".

In response to the Russian invasion of Ukraine the EU Commission adopted on 18 July 2025 a sanctions package against Russia that bans the direct and indirect use of the Nord Stream pipelines.

== History ==
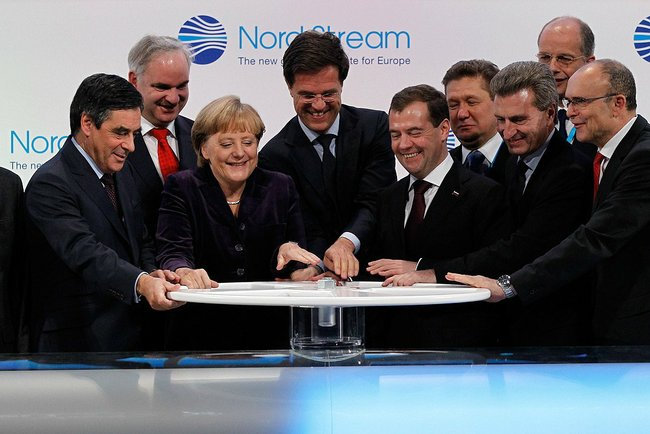
The Nord Stream opening ceremony on 8 November 2011 with François Fillon, Angela Merkel, Mark Rutte, Dmitry Medvedev, Günther Oettinger, and Erwin Sellering

=== 1997–present ===
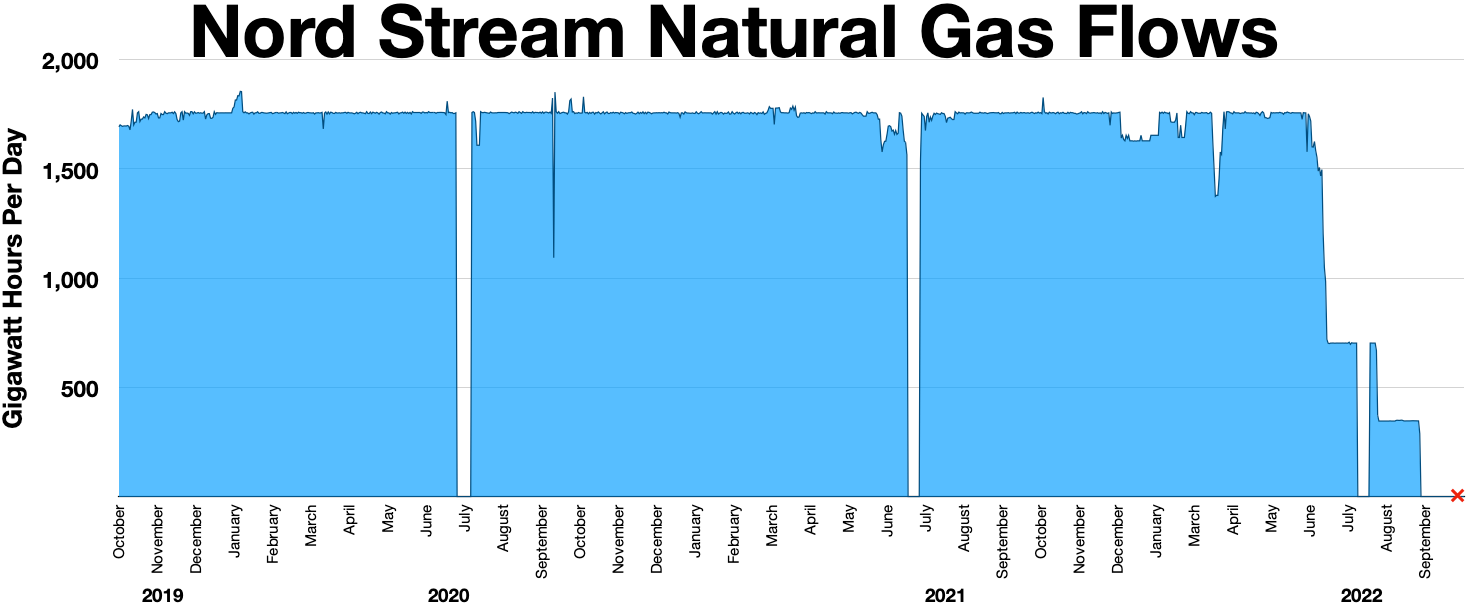
Nord Stream gas flows * Russia cut the flow of natural gas by more than half in June 2022 because they alleged they could not get a part seized by the Canadian government because of sanctions. Siemens, the producer of the part, denied that this piece was critical for operations. * Russia halted gas flows on 11 July 2022 for annual maintenance for 10 days and resumed partial operations on 21 July. * Russia stopped the flow of natural gas on 31 August 2022 for alleged maintenance for 3 days, but later said they could not provide a timeframe for restarting gas flow. The EU accused Russia of fabricating a false story to justify the cut. X Pipeline was sabotaged on 26 September 2022.

The Nord Stream pipeline project began in 1997, when Gazprom and Finnish oil company Neste (Note: In 1998, Neste merged with Imatran Voima to form Fortum Oyj. In 2005, it was divested into Neste Oyj.) formed the joint company North Transgas Oy for the construction and operation of a gas pipeline from Russia to northern Germany across the Baltic Sea. North Transgas Oy cooperated with the German gas company Ruhrgas. (Note: Ruhrgas later became part of E.ON, which then split into E.ON and Uniper.) A route survey was done in the exclusive economic zones of Finland, Sweden, Denmark, and Germany, and a feasibility study of the pipeline was conducted in 1998. Several routes were considered, including those with onshore segments through Finland and Sweden.

In April 2001, Gazprom, Fortum, Ruhrgas, and Wintershall adopted a statement regarding a joint feasibility study for the construction of the pipeline, and in November 2002, the Management Committee of Gazprom approved a schedule of project implementation.

In May 2005, Fortum withdrew from the project and sold its stake in North Transgas to Gazprom. As a result, Gazprom became the only shareholder of North Transgas Oy.

In September 2005, Gazprom, BASF, and E.ON signed a basic agreement on the construction of a North European gas pipeline. In November 2005, the North European Gas Pipeline Company (later Nord Stream AG) was incorporated in Zug, Switzerland. In December 2005, Gazprom started construction of the Russian onshore segment of the Nord Stream project, in order to connect Nord Stream with the wider Russian natural gas pipeline system. Specifically, the Gryazovets–Vyborg gas pipeline was built in Babayevo, Vologda Oblast, connecting Nord Stream to the Northern Lights Pipeline network. The construction was completed in 2010.

In October 2006, the pipeline and the operating company were officially renamed Nord Stream AG. All information related to the pipeline project, including results of the seabed survey of 1998, was transferred from North Transgas to Nord Stream AG. In November 2006, North Transgas was officially dissolved.

The environmental impact assessment started in November 2006, when notifications were sent to Russia, Finland, Sweden, Denmark, and Germany as parties of origin (countries whose exclusive economic zones or territorial waters the pipeline was planned to pass through), and Poland, Latvia, Lithuania, and Estonia as affected parties. The final report on transboundary environmental impact assessment was delivered in March 2009.

The gas systems operated by Finland's Gasum are connected to Nord Stream via a branch pipeline in Karelia.

In March 2007, Nord Stream AG hired Italian company Snamprogetti, a subsidiary of Saipem, for detailed design engineering of the pipeline. A letter of intent for construction works was signed with Saipem in September 2007 and the contract was concluded in June 2008. In September 2007, the pipe supply contracts were awarded to pipe producers EUROPIPE and OMK. In February 2008, the concrete weight coating and logistics services agreements were awarded to EUPEC PipeCoatings S.A.

In December 2008, Rolls-Royce Holdings was awarded a contract to supply turbines for the compressor. In January 2009, Dutch Royal Boskalis and Danish Dredging Contractor Rohde Nielsen A/S were awarded a joint venture seabed dredging contract. The supply contracts for the second line were awarded to OMK, Europipe, and Sumitomo Heavy Industries in January 2010.

The agreement to add Gasunie to the consortium as the fourth partner was signed in November 2007. In June 2008, Gasunie was included in the register of shareholders. In March 2010, French energy company GDF Suez signed with Gazprom a memorandum of understanding to acquire 9% stake in the project. The transaction was closed in July 2010.

In August 2008, Nord Stream AG hired former Finnish prime minister Paavo Lipponen as a consultant to help speed up the application process in Finland and to serve as a link between Nord Stream and Finnish authorities.

In December 2007, Nord Stream AG submitted application documents to the Swedish government for the pipeline construction in the Swedish Exclusive Economic Zone. In February 2008, the Swedish government rejected the consortium's application, which it had found incomplete. A new application was filed later. In October 2009, Nord Stream received a construction permit to build the pipeline in Danish waters. In November 2009, the Swedish and Finnish authorities permitted the laying of the pipeline in their exclusive economic zones. In February 2010, the Regional State Administrative Agency for Southern Finland issued the final environmental permit allowing construction of the Finnish section of the pipeline.

Construction of the Portovaya compressor station in Vyborg, near the Gulf of Finland, began in January 2010. The first pipe of the pipeline was laid in April 2010 in the Swedish exclusive economic zone by the Castoro Sei vessel, which continued to lay most of the distance. The Castoro 10 performed pipe work near Germany, and Solitaire was pipe-laying near Finland. Construction of the pipeline was officially launched in April 2010 at Portovaya Bay.

The first pipe was completed in May 2011. Underwater works were completed in June 2011. In August 2011, Nord Stream was connected to the German OPAL pipeline, with the first gas delivery pumped in September 2011. Construction of the second pipe was completed in August 2012 and inaugurated in October 2012.

The pipeline was officially inaugurated in November 2011 by German Chancellor Angela Merkel, Russian President Dmitry Medvedev, French Prime Minister François Fillon, and Dutch Prime Minister Mark Rutte at a ceremony held in Lubmin.

During a routine annual checkup in November 2015, a small, remotely operated armed mine-disposal vehicle was found lying near the pipeline near the Öland island in the Baltic Sea. As the craft lay in Swedish territorial waters, Nord Stream requested the Swedish Navy to remove it.

Although the nominal capacity of the pipeline is 55 billion cubic metres per annum (1.9 trillion cubic feet per annum), it transported 59.2 billion cubic metres (2.09 trillion cubic feet) in 2021.

On 25 July 2022, Gazprom announced it would reduce gas flows to Germany to 20% of the maximum capacity, or 50% of the current throughput. The company shut down the pipeline for 10 days because of maintenance and claimed the reduction was due to a repaired turbine in Montréal, Canada, that could not be delivered due to sanctions against Russia. The German government denied this claim and believed there was no reason for reducing the flow. Meanwhile, during a press conference in Tehran, Putin said that these flows could be increased again if Russia receives more turbines from the manufacturer.

On 31 August 2022, Gazprom halted any gas delivery through Nord Stream 1 for three days, officially because of maintenance. On 2 September 2022, the company announced that natural gas supplies via the Nord Stream 1 pipeline would remain shut off indefinitely until the main gas turbine at the Portovaya compressor station near St Petersburg was fixed due to an engine oil leak. Gazprom justified this by claiming that European Union sanctions against Russia had resulted in technical problems, preventing it from providing the full volume of contracted gas through the pipeline; Siemens Energy, which maintains the turbine, rejected this and stated that there are no legal obstacles to its provision of maintenance for the pipeline.

=== 2022 sabotage ===
On 26 September 2022, multiple ruptures in the NS1 and the NS2 pipelines were detected in what appeared to be an act of sabotage.

Unexplained large pressure drops were reported in both pipelines at the end-station in Germany. A gas leak from NS2 was located late on 26 September. Early on the 27th, two separate leaks in NS1 were discovered. They occurred in international waters, but within the Danish and Swedish exclusive economic zones. Both Berliner Zeitung and Le Monde newspapers suggested acts of sabotage, and a Kremlin spokesman also said it could be. Neither pipeline was in operation at the time of these incidents, but both did contain pressurized gas.

The rupturing of the Nord Stream pipelines happened as the Baltic Pipe was being opened for natural gas to come in from the North Sea through Denmark to Poland. As of 29 September 2022, the Yamal–Europe pipeline is operational, although "There are concerns that if Russia introduces sanctions against Ukraine's Naftogaz [...] that could prohibit Gazprom from paying Ukraine transit fees [... that] could end Russian gas flows to Europe via the country."

In September 2022 The Washington Post reported that the incidents are likely to put a permanent end to both Nord Stream 1 and 2.

On 27 April 2023 the Danish Defence Command confirmed that six Russian navy ships including the SS-750 salvage ship able to launch a mini-submarine were operating in the area four days before the explosion. Russia denied involvement in the sabotage.

The United States rejected claims from investigative journalist Seymour Hersh of involvement in the sabotage.

As of February 2023 none of the three separate investigations carried out by Germany, Sweden and Denmark publicly assigned responsibility for the damage.

In June 2023, The Washington Post reported that the United States had intelligence of a Ukrainian plan to attack Nord Stream, and in November 2023 reported that Roman Chervinsky, a colonel in Ukraine's Special Operations Forces, had coordinated the Nord Stream pipeline attack.

== Technical features ==
=== Russian onshore-pipeline ===
Nord Stream is fed by the Gryazovets–Vyborg gas pipeline. It is a part of the integrated gas transport network of Russia that connects the existing grid in Gryazovets with the coastal compressor station at Vyborg. The length of the pipeline is 917 km (570 mi). The diameter of the pipe is 1,420 mm (56 in), and its working pressure is 100 atm (10 MPa), which is secured by six compressor stations. The Gryazovets-Vyborg pipeline, parallel to the branch of the Northern Lights pipeline (Gryazovets–Leningrad and Leningrad–Vyborg–Russian-state-border pipelines), also supplies gas to the Northwestern region of Russia, which includes Saint Petersburg and Leningrad Oblast. The pipeline is operated by Gazprom Transgaz Saint Petersburg.

=== Baltic Sea offshore pipeline ===
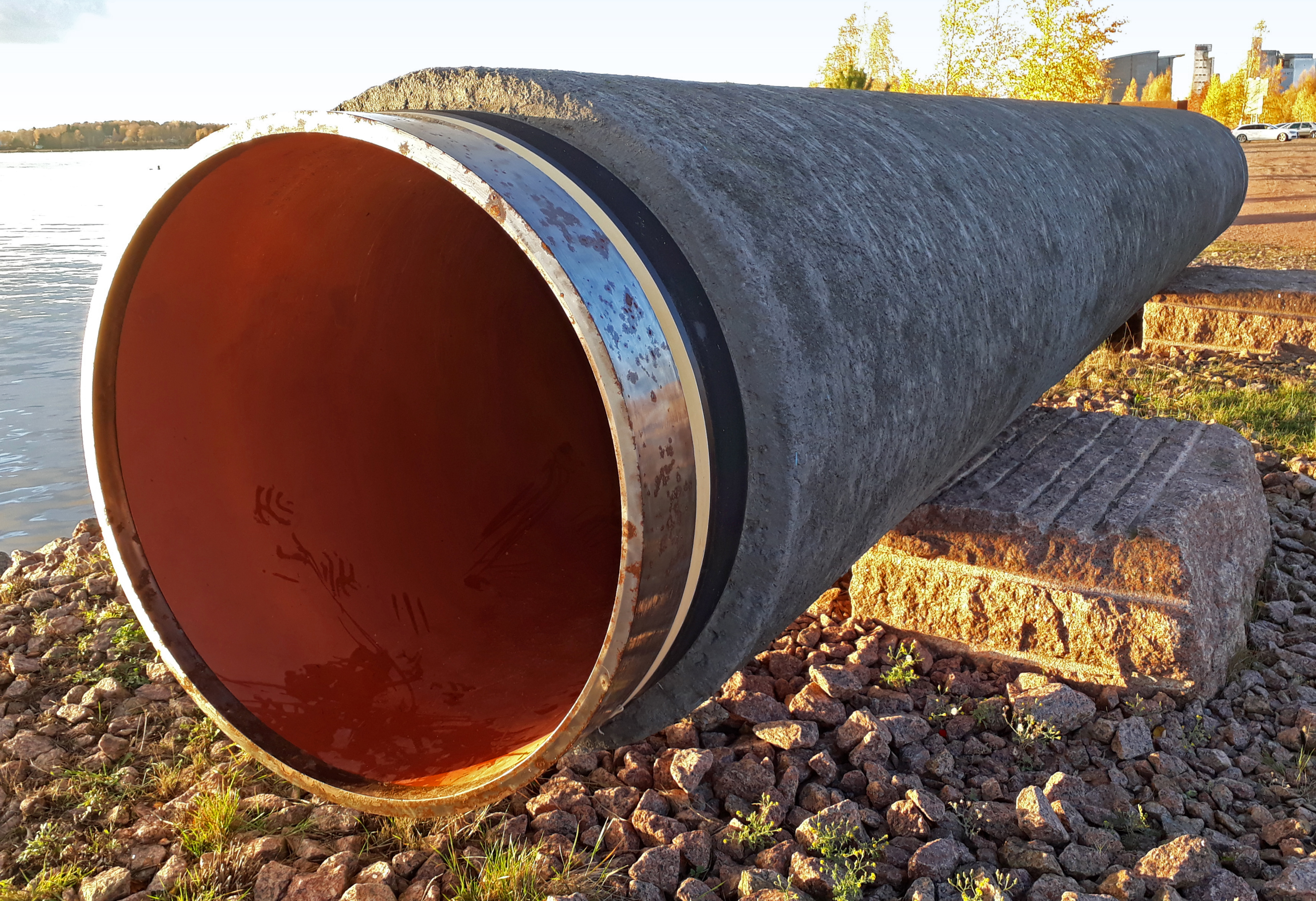
A piece of Nord Stream pipe on public display in Kotka, Finland

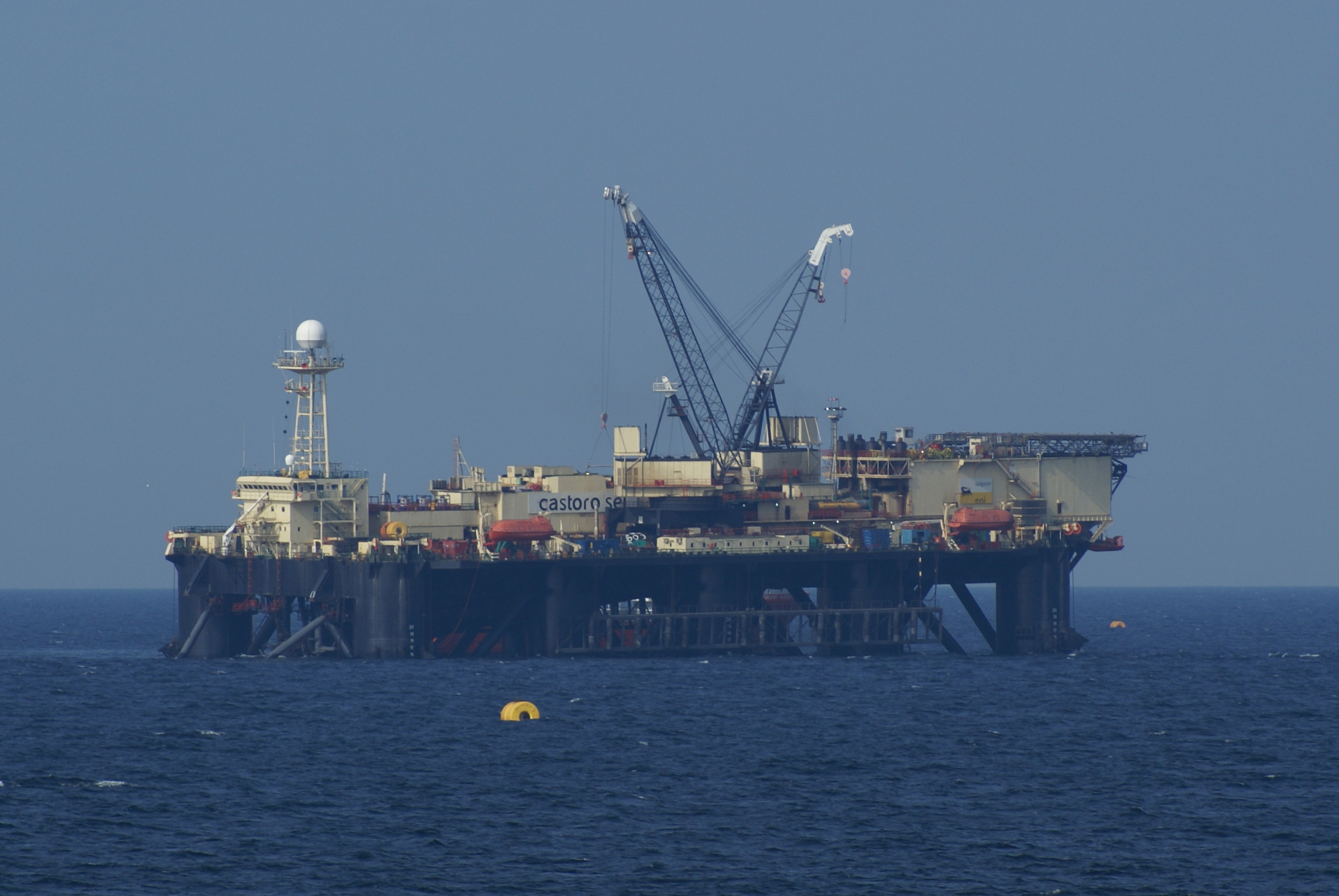
The semi-submersible pipe-laying vessel Castoro Sei operating for Nord Stream in the Baltic Sea south-east of Gotland, Sweden, in late March 2011

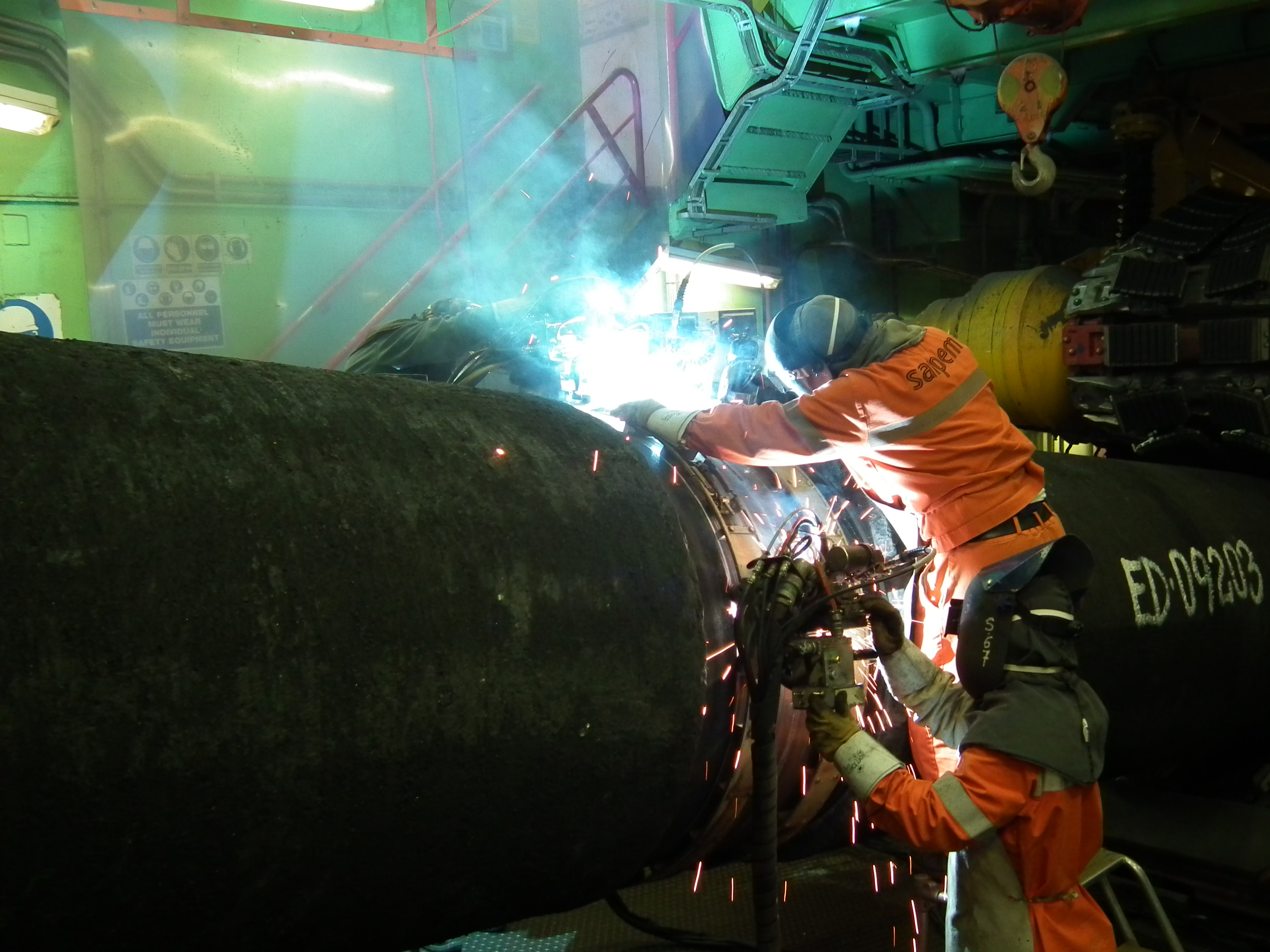
Two pipes are welded together on the Castoro Sei pipelaying vessel.

The Nord Stream offshore pipeline is operated by Nord Stream AG. It runs from the Vyborg compressor station at Portovaya Bay along the bottom of the Baltic Sea to Greifswald, Germany. The length of the subsea pipeline is 1,222 km (759 mi), of which 1.5 km (0.93 mi) are on Russian inland, 121.8 km (65.8 nmi) in Russian territorial waters, 1.4 km (0.8 nmi) in the Russian economic zone, 375.3 km (202.6 nmi) in the Finnish economic zone, 506.4 km (273.4 nmi) in the Swedish economic zone, 87.7 km (47.4 nmi) in Danish territorial waters, 49.4 km (26.7 nmi) in the Danish economic zone, 31.2 km (16.8 nmi) in the German economic zone, 49.9 km (26.9 nmi) in German territorial waters, and 0.5 km (0.31 mi) on German inland.

The pipeline has two parallel lines, both with a capacity of 27.5 billion m^{3} (970 billion cu ft) of natural gas per year. Pipes have a diameter of about 1,220 mm (48 in), and wall thicknesses of 41, 38 and 26.8 mm (1.61, 1.50 and 1.06 in) with corresponding working pressures of 220, 200 and 170 bar (22, 20 and 17 MPa; 3,200, 2,900 and 2,500 psi).

=== Middle and Western European pipelines ===
Nord Stream is connected to two transmission pipelines in Germany. The southern pipeline (OPAL pipeline) runs from Greifswald to Olbernhau near the Germany–Czech Republic border. It connects Nord Stream with JAGAL (connected to the Yamal-Europe pipeline) and STEGAL (connected to the Russian gas transport route via Czechia and Slovakia) transmission pipelines. The Gazelle pipeline, put into operation in January 2013, links the OPAL pipeline with the gas network in southern Germany.

The western pipeline (NEL pipeline) runs from Greifswald to Achim, where it is connected with the Rehden–Hamburg gas pipeline. Together with the MIDAL pipeline, it creates the Greifswald–Bunde connection. Further gas delivery to the United Kingdom is made through the connection between Bunde and Den Helder, and from there through the offshore interconnector Balgzand–Bacton (BBL Pipeline).

== Supply sources ==
Countries by natural gas proven reserves (2014), based on data from The World Factbook. Russia has the world's largest reserves.

Russia's West Siberian petroleum basin is the source location for Nord Stream. The Yuzhno-Russkoye field, which is located in the Krasnoselkupsky District, Yamalo-Nenets Autonomous Okrug, Tyumen Oblast, was designated as the main source of natural gas for the Nord Stream 1 pipeline. Nord Stream 1 and 2 are also fed from fields in the Yamal Peninsula, namely Ob and Taz bays. It was predicted that the majority of the gas from Russia's offshore Shtokman field would also be sold to Europe via the Nord Stream pipeline following the completion a pipeline connection across the Kola peninsula to Volkhov or Vyborg. However, the Shtokman project was postponed indefinitely.

The proposed gas route from Russia's West Siberian petroleum basin to China is known as the Power of Siberia 2 pipeline. For Russia, the pipeline allows another economic partnership in the face of resistance to the Nord Stream 2 pipeline.

== Costs and financing ==
According to Gazprom, the costs of the onshore pipelines in Russia and Germany were around €6 billion. The offshore section of the project cost €8.8 billion. 30% of the financing was raised through equity provided by shareholders in proportion to their stakes in the project, while 70% was obtained from external financing by banks.

There were two tranches of fundraising. The first tranche, totaling €3.9 billion, included a €3.1 billion, 16-year facility covered by export credit agencies and an €800 million, 10-year uncovered commercial loan to be serviced by earnings from the transportation contracts. A further €1.6 billion is covered by French credit insurance company Euler Hermes, €1 billion by German loan guarantee program UFK, and €500 million by Italian export credit agency SACE SpA. Crédit Agricole is the documentation bank and bank facility agent.

Société Générale is the intercreditor agent, Sace facility agent, security trustee, and model bank. Commerzbank is the Hermes facility agent, UniCredit is the UFK facility agent, Deutsche Bank is the account bank, and Sumitomo Mitsui Banking Corporation is the technical and environmental bank. The financial advisers were Société Générale, Royal Bank of Scotland (ABN Amro), Dresdner Kleinwort (Commerzbank), and Unicredit. The legal adviser to Nord Stream was White & Case, and legal adviser for the lenders was Clifford Chance.

== Contractors ==
The environmental impact assessment of Nord Stream 1 was carried out by Rambøll and Environmental Resource Management. The route and seabed surveys were conducted by Marin Mätteknik, IfAÖ, PeterGaz, and DOF Subsea.

Preliminary front-end engineering was done by Intec Engineering. The design engineering of the subsea pipeline was done by Snamprogetti (now part of Saipem) and the pipeline was constructed by Saipem. Saipem subcontracted Allseas to lay more than 25% of both pipelines. The seabed was prepared for the laying of the pipeline by a joint venture of Royal Boskalis and Tideway. The pipes were provided by EUROPIPE, OMK, and Sumitomo.

Concrete weight coating and logistics services were provided by EUPEC PipeCoatings S.A. For the concrete weight coating, new coating plants were constructed in Mukran (Germany) and Kotka (Finland). Rolls-Royce plc supplied eight aeroderivative gas turbines driving centrifugal compressors for front-end gas boosting at the Vyborg (Portovaya) gas compressor station. Dresser-Rand Group supplied DATUM compressors. Siirtec Nigi SPA provided a gas treatment unit for the Portovaya station.

For the construction period, Nord Stream AG created a logistic center in Gotland. Other interim stockyards are located in Mukran, Kotka, Hanko (Finland), and Karlskrona (Sweden).

== Project companies ==
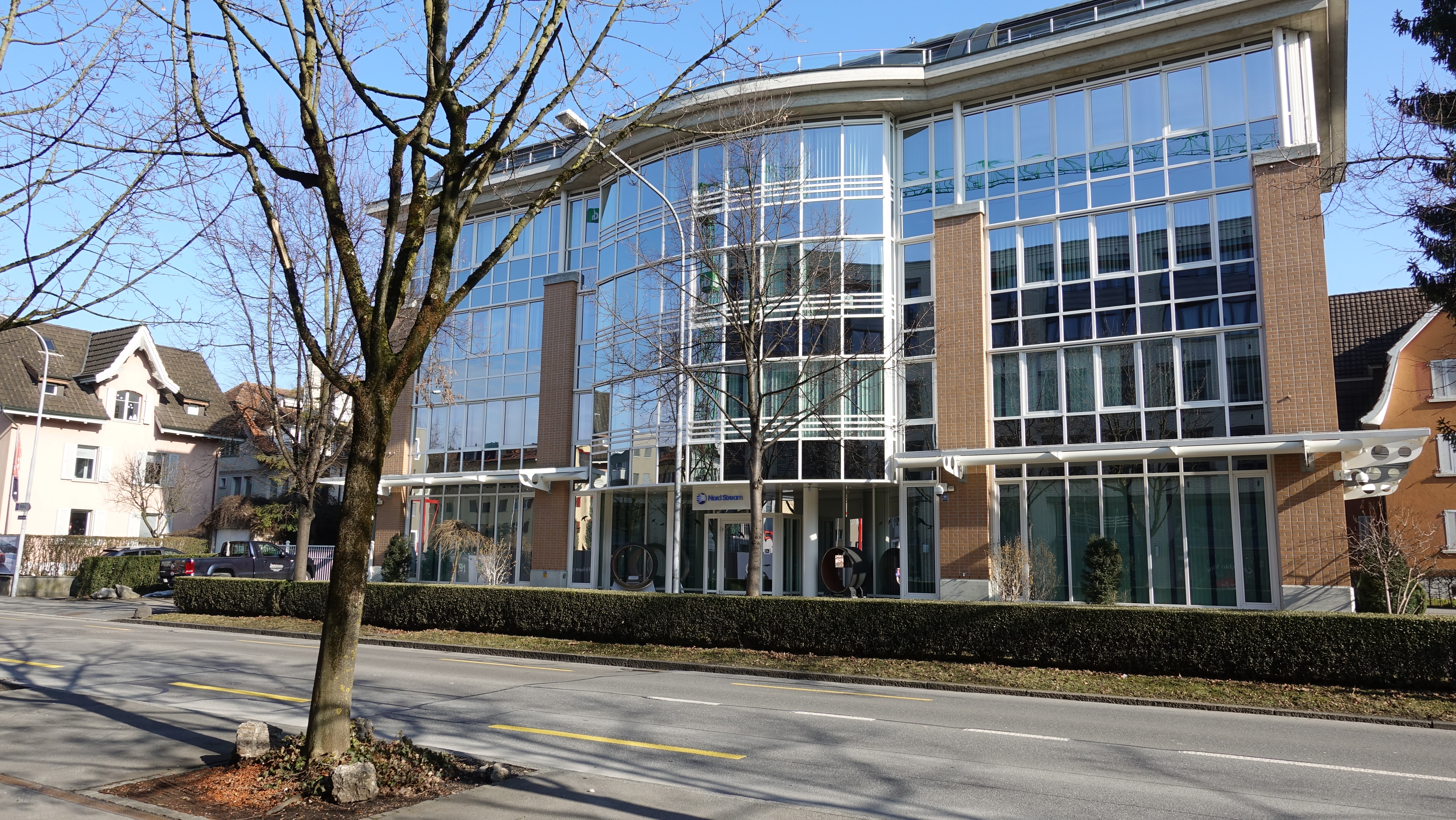
Nord Stream 1 office building in Zug, Switzerland

Nord Stream 1 is operated by the special-purpose company Nord Stream AG, incorporated in Zug, Switzerland, in November 2005. Shareholders of the company are the Russian gas company Gazprom (51% of shares), the German companies Wintershall Dea and PEG Infrastruktur AG (E.ON) (both 15.5%), the Dutch gas company Gasunie (9%), and the French gas company Engie (9%). The chairman of the shareholders' committee is German ex-chancellor Gerhard Schröder.

== Transportation contracts ==
In October 2005, Gazprom signed a contract with German gas company Wingas—a then joint venture of Gazprom and Wintershall (a subsidiary of BASF)—to supply 9 billion cubic metres (320 billion cubic feet) of natural gas per year for 25 years.

In June 2006, Gazprom and Danish Ørsted A/S (then named DONG Energy) signed a twenty-year contract for the delivery of 1 billion m^{3} (35 billion cu ft) Russian gas per year to Denmark. Additionally, under a separate fifteen-year agreement, Ørsted would supply 600 million m^{3} (21 billion cu ft) natural gas per year to the Gazprom subsidiary, Gazprom Marketing and Trading, in the United Kingdom. In October 2009, the companies signed a contract to double the delivery to Denmark.

In August 2006, Gazprom and E.ON Ruhrgas signed an agreement to extend current contracts on natural gas supplies and signed a new contract for an additional 4 billion m^{3} (140 billion cu ft) per year through the Nord Stream pipeline. In December 2006, Gazprom and Gaz de France (now GDF Suez) agreed to an additional 2.5 billion m^{3} (88 billion cu ft) gas supply through Nord Stream.

== Controversies ==
The pipeline projects were criticized by some countries, geopolitical analysts, and environmental organizations (such as the World Wide Fund for Nature).

=== Political aspects ===
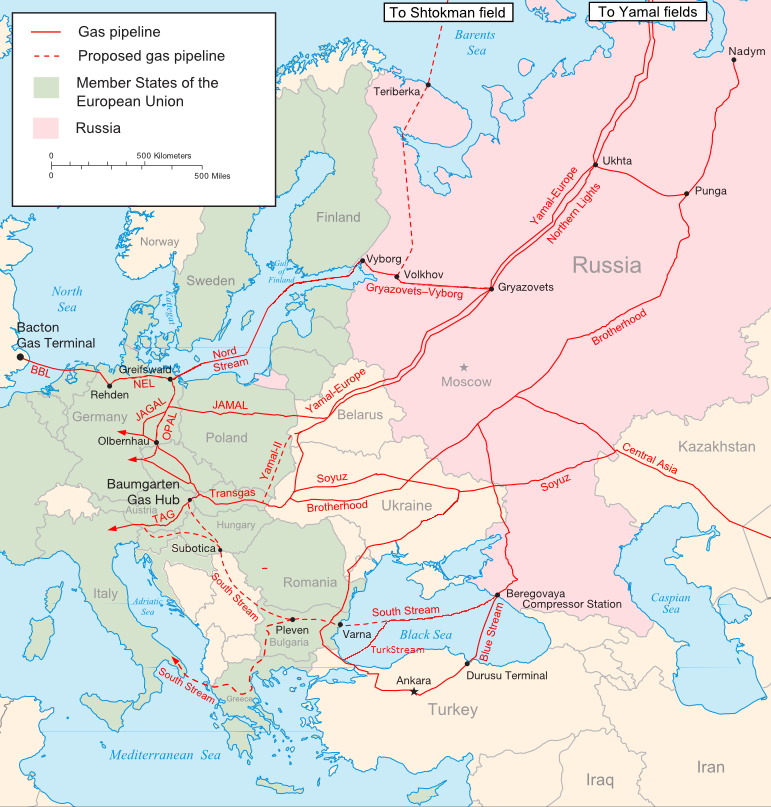
Major existing and planned natural gas pipelines supplying Russian gas to Europe

Opponents have seen the pipeline as a move by Russia to bypass traditional transit countries (currently Ukraine, Slovakia, Czech Republic, Belarus, and Poland). Some transit countries are concerned that a long-term plan of the Kremlin is to attempt to exert political influence on them by threatening their gas supply without affecting supplies to Western Europe. The fears are strengthened by the fact that Russia has refused to ratify the Energy Charter Treaty. Critics of Nord Stream say that Europe has become dangerously dependent on Russian natural gas, particularly since Russia could face problems meeting a surge in domestic as well as foreign demand. Some argue that Nordstream is an effort "to build expensive export infrastructure where the costs are unlikely to be recoverable all in order to avoid running gas supplies through transit states." Others caution it is a form of Russian imperialism.

In 2021, 45% of Europe's gas imports came from Russia. Following several Russia–Ukraine gas disputes over gas prices, as well as foreign policy toward Eastern Europe, it has been noted that the gas supplied by Russia can be used as a political tool.

A Swedish Defense Research Agency study, finished in March 2007, counted over 55 incidents since 1991, most with "both political and economic underpinnings". In April 2006, Radosław Sikorski, then Poland's defense minister, compared the project to the infamous 1939 Nazi–Soviet Molotov–Ribbentrop Pact. In his book The New Cold War: Putin's Russia and the Threat to the West, published in 2008, Edward Lucas stated, "though Nord Stream's backers insist that the project is business pure and simple, this would be easier to believe if it were more transparent".

In a report published by the Fridtjof Nansen Institute in 2008, Norwegian researcher Bendik Solum Whist noted that Nord Stream AG was incorporated in Switzerland, "whose strict banking secrecy laws makes the project less transparent than it would have been if based within the EU". Secondly, the Russian energy sector "in general lacks transparency" and Gazprom "is no exception".

Russian responses have argued that the pipeline increases Europe's energy security and that the criticism is caused by bitterness about the loss of significant transit revenues, as well as the loss of political influence that stems from the transit countries' ability to hold Russian gas supplies to Western Europe hostage to their local political agendas. As the first direct connection to Western Europe, the Nord Stream pipeline would reduce Russia's dependence on the transit countries. According to Gazprom, this direct connection to Germany would decrease risks in the gas transit zones, including the political risk of cutting off Russian gas exports to Western Europe.

In response to the 2022 Russian invasion of Ukraine, the European Commission and International Energy Agency presented joint plans to reduce reliance on Russian energy, reduce Russian gas imports by two thirds within a year, and completely by 2030. On 18 May 2022, the European Union published plans to end its reliance on Russian oil, natural gas, and coal by 2027.

=== Security and military aspects ===
Swedish military experts and several politicians, including former Minister for Defense Mikael Odenberg, have stated that the pipeline may cause a security policy problem for Sweden. According to Odenberg, the pipeline motivates the Russian Navy's presence in the Swedish economic zone, and Russia could use this for gathering military intelligence, if desired. Finnish military scholar Alpo Juntunen has said that even though the political discussion over Nord Stream in Finland concentrates on the various ecological aspects, there are clearly military implications to the pipeline that are not discussed openly in Finland.

More political concerns were raised when Vladimir Putin stated that the ecological safety of the pipeline project will be ensured by using the Baltic Fleet of the Russian Navy. German weekly Stern has reported that the fibre optic cable and repeater stations along the pipeline could theoretically also be used for espionage. Nord Stream AG asserted that a fibre optic control cable was neither necessary nor technically planned.

Deputy Chairman of the Board of Executive Directors of Gazprom Alexander Medvedev has dismissed these concerns, stating that "some objections are put forward that are laughable – political, military, or linked to spying. That is really surprising because in the modern world… it is laughable to say a gas-pipeline is a weapon in a spy-war".

=== Economic aspects ===
Russian and German officials have claimed that the pipeline leads to economic savings due to the elimination of transit fees (as transit countries would be bypassed), and a higher operating pressure of the offshore pipeline which leads to lower operating costs (by eliminating the necessity for expensive midway compressor stations). According to Ukrtransgaz in 2011, Ukraine alone will lose natural gas transit fees of up to $720 million per year from Nord Stream 1.

According to the Naftogaz chairman in 2019, Ukraine will lose $3 billion per year of natural gas transit fees from Nord Stream 2. Gazprom has stated that it will divert 20 billion m^{3} (710 billion cu ft) of natural gas transported through Ukraine to Nord Stream. Opponents say that the maintenance costs of a submarine pipeline are higher than for an overland route. In 1998, former Gazprom chairman Rem Vyakhirev claimed that the project was economically unfeasible.

As the Nord Stream pipeline crosses the waterway to Polish ports in Szczecin and Świnoujście, there were concerns that it would reduce the depth of the waterway leading to the ports. However, in 2011, the then-prime minister of Poland, Donald Tusk, as well as several experts, confirmed that the Nord Stream pipeline did not block the development plans of Świnoujście and Szczecin ports.

=== Environmental aspects ===
The pipeline's greatest environmental impact is the increased consumption of natural gas imported to the EU. This conflicts with decarbonization efforts for climate protection. At a nominal capacity of 55 billion m^{3} (1.9 trillion cu ft) per year, each pipe pair can lead to carbon emissions of 110 million tonnes (240 billion pounds) of CO_{2} annually.

The Portovaya compressor station in Russia at the beginning of Nord Stream 1, with a rating of 366 megawatts, is estimated to produce around 1.5 million tonnes (3.3 billion pounds) of CO_{2} emissions per year, not including other compressor stations for the gas pipelines within Russia.

Since the pressure loss is proportional to the square of the flow velocity, dividing an unchanged gas transport volume between two Nord Stream systems could save around 3/4 of the pumping effort and presumably avoid more than 1 million tonnes (2.2 billion pounds) of CO_{2} emissions annually. Using the discounted CO_{2} damage costs of €180 per tonne (€0.082/lb) from the German Environment Agency (Umweltbundesamt), this would, after a rough estimate, enable the third tube to be amortized within around 20 years from a global point of view. The fourth tube could also possibly be amortized in the hypothetical case of overall optimization of gas flow over various pipelines between Russia and the EU.

The production of over 2 million tonnes (4.4 billion pounds) of steel for the Nord Stream 2 tubes resulted in more than 3 million tonnes (6.6 billion pounds) of CO_{2} emissions, not including the concrete-coating and the associated pipeline sections onshore.

Before construction, there were concerns that during construction the seabed would be disturbed, dislodging World War II-era naval mines and toxic materials including chemical waste, chemical munitions, and other items dumped in the Baltic Sea in the past decades, and thereby toxic substances could surface from the seabed and damage the Baltics' particularly sensitive ecosystem. Swedish Environment Minister Andreas Carlgren demanded that the environmental analysis should include alternative ways of taking the pipeline across the Baltic, as the pipeline is projected to be passing through areas considered environmentally problematic and risky.

Sweden's three opposition parties called for an examination of the possibility of rerouting the pipeline onto dry land. Finnish environmental groups campaigned to consider a more southern route, claiming that the seabed is flatter there and so construction would be more straightforward, and therefore potentially less disruptive to waste—including dioxins and dioxin-like compounds—littered on the seabed.

Latvian president Valdis Zatlers said that Nord Stream was environmentally hazardous as, unlike in the North Sea, there is no such water circulation in the Baltic Sea. Ene Ergma, Speaker of the Parliament of Estonia (Estonian: Riigikogu), warned that the pipeline work would rip a canal in the seabed which will demand leveling the sand that lies along the way, atomizing volcanic formations and disposing of fill along the bottom of the sea, altering sea currents.

The impact on bird and marine life in the Baltic Sea is also a concern, as the Baltic Sea is recognized by the International Maritime Organization as a particularly sensitive sea area. The World Wide Fund for Nature requested that countries party to the Baltic Marine Environment Protection Commission (HELCOM) safeguard the Baltic marine habitats, which could be altered by the implementation of the Nord Stream project. Its Finnish branch said it might file a court case against Nord Stream AG if the company did not properly assess a potential alternative route on the southern side of Hogland. According to Nord Stream AG, this was not a suitable route for the pipeline because of the planned conservation area near Hogland, subsea cables, and a main shipping route.

Russian environmental organizations warned that the ecosystem in the Eastern part of the Gulf of Finland is the most vulnerable part of the Baltic Sea and assumed damage to the island territory of the planned Ingermanland Nature Preserve as a result of laying the pipeline. Swedish environmental groups were concerned that the pipeline was planned to pass too closely to the border of the marine reserve near Gotland. Greenpeace was also concerned that the pipeline would pass through several sites designated as marine conservation areas.

In April 2007, the Young Conservative League (YCL) of Lithuania started an online petition entitled "Protect the Baltic Sea While It's Still Not Too Late!", translated into all state languages of the countries of the Baltic region. On 29 January 2008, the Petitions Committee of the European Parliament organized a public hearing on the petition introduced by YCL leader Radvile Morkunaite. On 8 July 2008, the European Parliament endorsed, by 542 votes to 60, a non-binding report calling on the European Commission to evaluate the additional impact on the Baltic Sea caused by the Nord Stream project. The Riigikogu made a declaration on 27 October 2009, expressing "concern over the possible environmental impacts of the gas line" and emphasizing that international conventions have deemed "the Baltic Sea in an especially vulnerable environmental status".

Russian officials described these concerns as far-fetched and politically motivated by opponents of the project. They argued that during the construction the seabed will be cleaned, rather than endangered. Russian Foreign Minister Sergey Lavrov claimed that Russia fully respects the desire for a complete environmental sustainability of the project and that Russia is fully supportive of such an approach, and that all environmental concerns would be addressed in the process of environmental impact assessment.

Concerns were raised, since originally Nord Stream AG planned on rinsing out the pipeline with 2.3 billion litres (610 million US gallons) of a solution containing glutaraldehyde, which would be pumped afterward into the Baltic Sea. Nord Stream AG responded that glutaraldehyde would not be used, and even if the chemical were used, the effects would be brief and localized due to the speed with which the chemical breaks down once it comes in contact with water.

One of the problems raised was that the Baltic Sea (particularly the Gulf of Finland) remains heavily populated with naval mines. According to the hydrographic survey company Marin Mätteknik, around 85,000 mines were laid during World War I and II, of which only half have been recovered. In November 2008, it was reported that the pipeline would run through old sea mine defense lines, where mines had been previously cleared and their explosive devices had sunk to the seabed. Sunken mines, which were found along the pipeline route, lay primarily in international waters at a depth of more than 70 m (230 ft). Nord Stream AG planned to detonate the mines underwater.

Additionally, a lot of munitions have also been dumped into the Baltic Sea. Critics of the pipeline feared that the pipeline would disturb these ammunition dumps.

=== Ethical issues ===
The former Chancellor of Germany, Gerhard Schröder, and the President of Russia, Vladimir Putin, were strong advocates of the pipeline project during the negotiation phase. International media alluded to a past relationship between the managing director of Nord Stream AG, Matthias Warnig, himself a former East German secret police officer, and Vladimir Putin when he was a KGB agent in East Germany. These allegations were denied by Matthias Warnig, who said that he had met Vladimir Putin for the first time in his life in 1991, when Putin was the head of the Committee for External Relations of the Saint Petersburg Mayor's Office.

The agreement to build the pipeline was signed ten days before the German parliamentary election. On 24 October 2005, a few weeks before Schröder had stepped down as Chancellor, the German government guaranteed to cover €1 billion of the Nord Stream project cost, should Gazprom default on a loan. However, this guarantee expired at the end of 2006 without ever having been needed. Soon after leaving the post of Chancellor of Germany, Gerhard Schröder agreed to head the shareholders' committee of Nord Stream AG. This has been widely described by German and international media as a conflict of interest, the implication being that the pipeline project may have been pushed through for personal gain rather than for improving gas supplies to Germany. Information about the German government's guarantee was requested by the European Commission. No formal charges have been filed against any party despite years of exhaustive investigations.

In February 2009, the Swedish prosecutor's office started an investigation based on suspicions of bribery and corruption after a college on the island of Gotland received a donation from Nord Stream. The 5 million Swedish kronor (US$574,000) donation was directed to a professor at Gotland University College who had previously warned that the Nord Stream pipeline would come too close to a sensitive bird zone. The consortium has hired several former high-ranking officials, such as Ulrica Schenström, former undersecretary at the Swedish Prime Minister's office, and Dan Svanell, former press secretary for several politicians in the Swedish Social Democratic Party. In addition, the former Prime Minister of Finland, Paavo Lipponen, had worked for Nord Stream as an adviser since 2008.

=== Land-based alternatives ===
On 11 January 2007, the Ministry of Trade and Industry of Finland made a statement on the environmental impact assessment program of the Russia–Germany natural gas pipeline, in which it mentioned that alternative routes via Latvia, Lithuania, Kaliningrad, or Poland might theoretically be shorter than the route across the Baltic Sea, would be easier to flexibly increase the capacity of the pipeline, and might have better financial results. There were calls from Sweden to consider rerouting the pipeline onto dry land.

Poland proposed the construction of a second line of the Yamal–Europe pipeline, as well as the Amber pipeline through Latvia, Lithuania, and Poland, as land-based alternatives to the offshore pipeline. The Amber project proposed laying a natural gas pipeline across the Tver, Novgorod, and Pskov oblasts in Russia and then through Latvia and Lithuania to Poland, where it would be re-connected to the Yamal–Europe pipeline. Latvia proposed using its underground gas storage facilities if the onshore route was used. Proponents claimed that the Amber pipeline would cost half as much as an underwater pipeline, would be shorter, and would have less environmental impact.

Critics of this proposal said it would be more expensive for the suppliers over the long-term, because the main aim of the project was to reduce transit costs. Nord Stream AG responded that the Baltic Sea would be the only route for the pipeline, and it would not consider an overland alternative.

=== World War II graves ===
In May 2008, a former member of the European Parliament from Estonia, Andres Tarand, raised the issue that the Nord Stream pipeline could disturb World War II graves dating from naval battles in 1941. A Nord Stream spokesman stated that only one sunken ship is in the vicinity of the planned pipeline and added that it would not be disturbed. In July 2008, it was announced that one of DOF Subsea's seismic vessels had discovered the wreck of a submarine with Soviet markings, believed to have sunk during World War II, during a survey for the planned Nord Stream pipeline in Finland's exclusive economic zone in the Gulf of Finland.

In addition to the wreck of the Soviet submarine, there are sunken ships on the route of Nord Stream in the Bay of Greifswald and in the Gulf of Finland. A ship in the Bay of Greifswald is one of twenty sunk in 1715 by the Swedish navy to create a physical barrier across the shallow entrance to the bay's coastal lagoon. Russian archaeologists claimed that the ship in the Gulf of Finland "was probably built in 1710 and sank during a raid aimed at conquering Finland" in 1713 during the reign of Peter the Great.

== See also ==
- Blue Stream – Trans-Black Sea gas pipeline
- Nord Stream 2 – Natural gas pipeline between Russia and Germany
- Yamal–Europe pipeline – Natural gas pipeline from Russia to Germany
- South Stream – Proposed natural gas pipeline through south-eastern Europe
- TurkStream – Natural gas pipeline from Russia to Turkey
- Russia–Ukraine gas disputes – Disputes between Naftogaz Ukrayiny and Gazprom
- Economy of Germany
- Economy of Russia
- List of countries by natural gas exports
- List of countries by natural gas imports
- List of countries by natural gas proven reserves
