= Gazela Pipeline =

Czech natural gas pipeline

Gazela
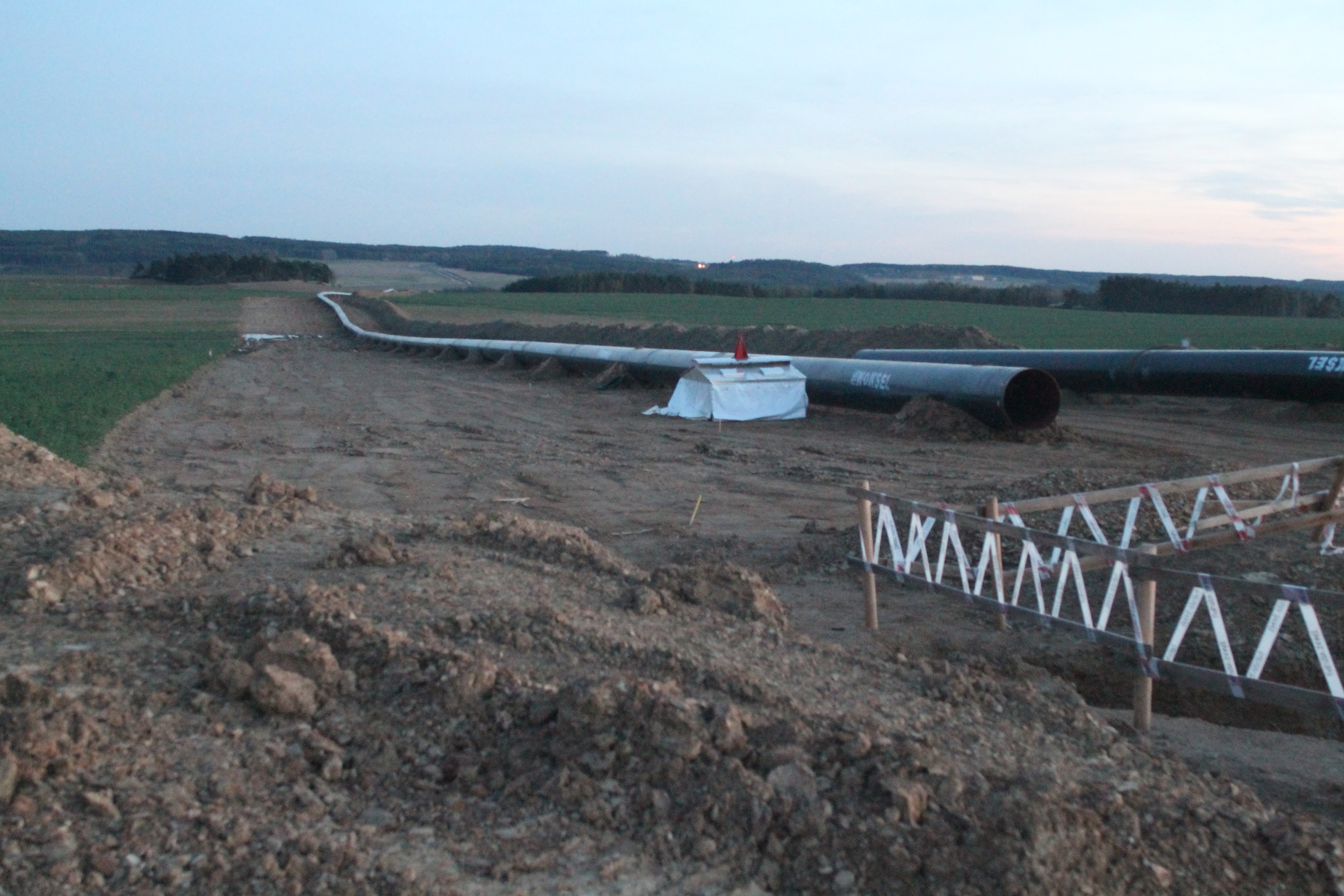
- Map of Gazela

Location
- Country: Czech Republic
- Direction: north–south
- Start: Hora Svaté Kateřiny
- Passes through: Mladotice; Chomutov
- To: Rozvadov/Waidhaus

General information
- Type: Natural gas
- Operator: Net4Gas
- Construction started: 14 October 2010
- Commissioned: 14 January 2013

Technical information
- Length: 166 km (103 mi)
- Maximum discharge: 33×10^{9} m^{3}/a (1.2×10^{12} cu ft/a)
- Diameter: 1,422 mm (56 in)

Gazela (Czech: plynovod Gazela) is a natural gas pipeline in the Czech Republic. It is operated by Net4Gas, a company owned by Allianz Capital Partners and OMERS Infrastructure. The project costs around €400 million.

== History ==
Construction started on 14 October 2010 in Krušné Hory, north Bohemia. It was constructed by Russian Stroytransgaz.

The pipeline was officially opened on 14 January 2013.

== Route ==
The pipeline connects the north Bohemian town of Hora Svaté Kateřiny and Rozvadov/Waidhaus on the Czech–German border. These are natural gas border delivery stations by which Russian gas is transported from the Czech Republic to Germany. In north the Gazela pipeline is connected to the OPAL pipeline, a connection pipeline to Nord Stream 1.

There were three possible route options with the length from 166 to 235 kilometres (103 to 146 mi). It was decided to construct the pipeline in the 166 kilometres (103 mi) long route along the existing gas pipelines. The pipeline will divert from the existing pipelines only in the Mladotice–Chomutov section.

== See also ==
- Energy in the Czech Republic
- Rehden-Hamburg gas pipeline
- MIDAL
- NEL pipeline
