= WEDAL =

MIDAL

Location
- Country: Germany
- Direction: east–west
- Start: Bad Salzuflen (connected to MIDAL)
- Passes through: Soest
- To: Aachen (connected to the Belgian grid)

General information
- Type: natural gas
- Operator: Gascade Gastransport GmbH
- Construction started: 1996
- Commissioned: 1998

Technical information
- Length: 319 km (198 mi)
- Maximum discharge: 10 billion cubic meters per year
- Diameter: 1,000 mm (39 in)
- No. of compressor stations: 2
- Compressor stations: Lippe; Weisweiler

WEDAL (Westdeutschland-Anbindungsleitung) is a 319 kilometres (198 mi) long German natural gas pipeline, which connects the MIDAL pipeline with the Belgian natural gas grid. WEDAL branches off the MIDAL pipeline in Bad Salzuflen. From there the pipeline runs to Soest and further across North Rhine-Westphalia to the connection at the Belgian border near Aachen. The construction of WEDAL started in 1996 and the pipeline was completed in 1998. WEDAL is owned and operated by Wingas GmbH & Co. KG.

== See also ==
- JAGAL
- STEGAL
- NEL pipeline
