= MIDAL =

- Location of MIDAL

Location
- Country: Germany
- Direction: north–south
- Start: Bunde (connected to the Netherlands)
- Passes through: Rehden (connected to the Rehden–Hamburg gas pipeline); Bad Salzuflen (connected to WEDAL); Reckrod (connected to STEGAL)
- To: Ludwigshafen

General information
- Type: natural gas
- Operator: Gascade Gastransport GmbH
- Construction started: 1992
- Commissioned: 1993

Technical information
- Length: 702 km (436 mi)
- Maximum discharge: 12.8 billion cubic meters per year
- Diameter: 1,000 mm (39 in)
- No. of compressor stations: 3
- Compressor stations: Bunde; Lippe; Reckrod

MIDAL (Mitte-Deutschland-Anbindungsleitung) is a 702 kilometres (436 mi) long German natural gas pipeline, which connects the North Sea with southern Germany. It runs from Bunde, where it is connected with Netherlands gas system, and Emdel receiving terminal, to Ludwigshafen. The pipeline has a capacity of 12.8 billion cubic meters of natural gas per year. It was constructed in 1992–1993, and it is owned and operated by Wingas GmbH & Co. KG.

The northern section of the pipeline which runs from Bunde and Rysum to Rehden is 175 kilometres (109 mi) long and has a diameter of 900 millimetres (35 in). In Rehden, the pipeline is connected with the Rehden gas storage. Also the Rehden–Hamburg gas pipeline branches-off from MIDAL. In future, MIDAL will be connected with the NEL pipeline at Reheden.

The middle section with length of 175 kilometres (109 mi) connects Rehden with Reckrod. This section has a diameter of 1,000 millimetres (39 in). In Bad Salzuflen, the WEDAL pipeline towards Belgium branches-off from MIDAL. In Reckrod, MIDAL is connected with the STEGAL pipeline.

The 210 kilometres (130 mi) long southern section with a diameter of 800 millimetres (31 in) runs from Reckrod to Ludwigshafen. In Ludwigshafen, the pipeline is connected with a 57 kilometres (35 mi) long MIDAL-ERM branch-off pipeline to Jockgrim. It has a diameter of 400 millimetres (16 in). MIDAL-ERM was commissioned in April 1964.

== See also ==
- STEGAL
- JAGAL
- Rehden-Hamburg gas pipeline
- NEL pipeline
