= OPAL pipeline =

Gas pipeline in Germany

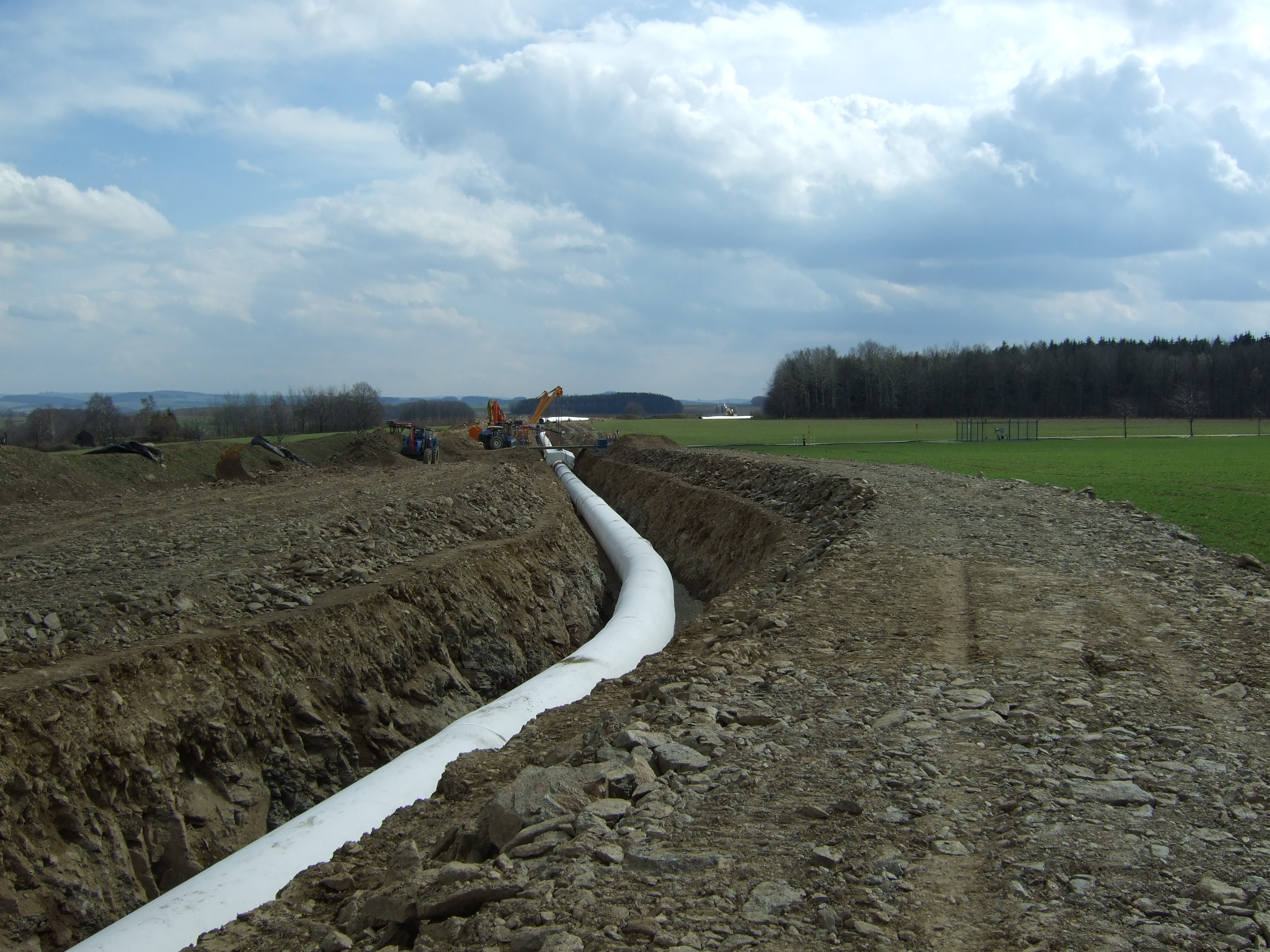
- OPAL pipeline near Weißenborn, Saxony
- Map of OPAL pipeline

Location
- Country: Germany
- Direction: north-south
- Start: Greifswald (Lubmin)
- To: Olbernhau
- Runs alongside: German eastern border

General information
- Type: natural gas
- Partners: Wintershall Dea; Gazprom
- Operator: OPAL Gastransport GmbH & Co KG
- Commissioned: 2011

Technical information
- Length: 470 km (290 mi)
- Maximum discharge: 35 billion cubic metres (1.2×10^{12} cu ft) per year
- Diameter: 1,400 mm (55 in)

The OPAL (Ostsee-Pipeline-Anbindungsleitung) is a natural gas pipeline in Germany alongside the German eastern border. The OPAL pipeline is one of two projected pipelines connecting the Nord Stream 1 pipeline to the existing pipeline grid in Middle and Western Europe, the other one being the NEL pipeline.

== Route ==
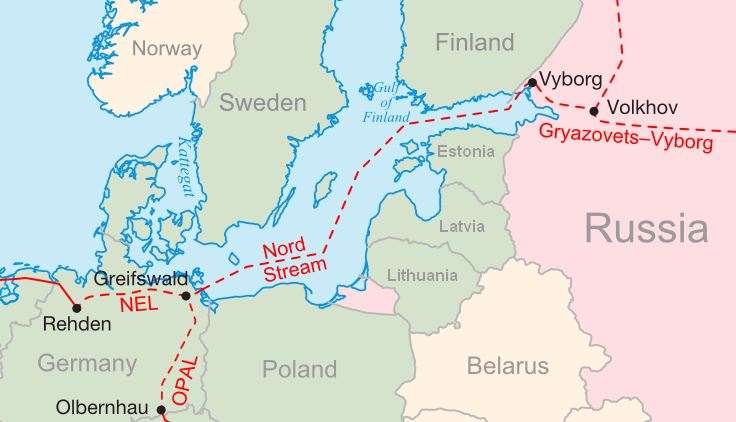
Connecting pipelines

The 470-kilometre (290 mi) long pipeline runs from Lubmin near Greifswald to Olbernhau near German-Czech border. It connects the Nord Stream pipeline with the JAGAL (distributes gas from the Yamal-Europe pipeline), and the STEGAL (distributes gas from the Central-European Russian gas transit system (Transgas) via Czechia and Slovakia) pipelines in Germany. On the German-Czech border the pipeline is connected with the Gazela Pipeline, to connect gas export pipelines in Czechia.

== Technical features ==
The diameter of the pipeline is 1,400 millimetres (55 in) and it has an operating pressure up to 100 bars (10,000 kPa). The capacity of the pipeline is 35 billion cubic metres (1.2 trillion cubic feet) per year of natural gas. The compressor station in Radeland, Brandeburg, is built by Siemens.

The pipeline cost around €1 billion. The construction was completed in 2011 and in August 2011 Nord Stream was connected with the OPAL pipeline.

== Project company ==
The pipeline was constructed by OPAL NEL TRANSPORT GmbH, a subsidiary of Wingas. It is operated by OPAL Gastransport GmbH & Co KG, owned by WIGA Transport Beteiligungs-GmbH & Co. KG, a joint venture of Wintershall Dea and Gazprom.

== Access by Gazprom ==
Polish state-run gas firm PGNiG and PGNiG Supply & Trading tried to restrict Gazprom's access to the pipeline. Oberlandesgericht Düsseldorf lifted the restrictions

After the decision Gazprom increased the throughput to 72.5 million m^{3}/d (26.462 billion/year).

== See also ==
- NEL pipeline
- Gazela Pipeline
