= NEL pipeline =

Coordinates: 52.6188°N 8.4963°E

- Constructions south of Schwerin
- Map of NEL pipeline

Location
- Country: Germany
- Direction: east-west
- Start: Lubmin
- Passes through: Sülstorf; Achim
- To: Rehden

General information
- Type: Natural gas
- Owner: NEL Gastransport GmbH
- Partners: Wintershall Dea; Gazprom
- Construction started: 2011
- Commissioned: 2012 (first stage); 2013 (second stage)

Technical information
- Length: 440 km (270 mi)
- Maximum discharge: 20 billion cubic metres per annum (710×10^{9} cu ft/a)
- Diameter: 56 in (1,422 mm)

The NEL (Nordeuropäische Erdgasleitung (English: Northern European natural gas pipeline), formerly known as Norddeutsche Erdgasleitung, is a 440 kilometres (270 mi) long natural gas pipeline in Germany.

== Route ==
The pipeline runs from Lubmin near Greifswald through Sülstorf and Achim to Rehden. It connects the Nord Stream 1 pipeline with the Rehden-Hamburg and MIDAL pipelines. The pipeline started operations on 5 November 2012. Between Sülstorf and Achim, it uses a pre-existing installation.

== Technical features ==
The diameter of the pipeline is 56 inches (1,400 mm) and it uses 100 bars (10,000 kPa) operating pressure. Its capacity is 20 billion cubic metres (710 billion cubic feet) of natural gas per year. The pipeline is expected to cost around €1 billion.

The developer of the pipeline asked exemption from the network access and transit fees regulation; however, this request was denied.

== Project company ==
The pipeline was built by OPAL NEL TRANSPORT GmbH. It is operated by NEL Gastransport GmbH, owned by WIGA Transport Beteiligungs-GmbH & Co. KG, a joint venture of Wintershall Dea and Gazprom.

== See also ==
- Nord Stream 1
- Rehden-Hamburg gas pipeline
- MIDAL
- OPAL pipeline
- Gazela Pipeline
