= Rehden–Hamburg gas pipeline =

Gas pipeline in Germany

Location
- Country: Germany
- Start: Rehden
- To: Hamburg

General information
- Type: natural gas
- Partners: Wingas, E.ON
- Operator: Gascade Gastransport GmbH
- Commissioned: 1994

Technical information
- Length: 132 km (82 mi)
- Diameter: 800 mm (31 in)

Rehden–Hamburg gas pipeline (RHG) is a 132 kilometres (82 mi) long branch of MIDAL pipeline with diameter of 800 millimetres (31 in) to supply Hamburg area with natural gas. The pipeline was constructed in 1994 by Wingas and E.ON Hanse (Hamburger Gaswerke). It connects to the natural gas storage facility in Rehden.

== See also ==
- WEDAL
- STEGAL
- JAGAL
- NEL pipeline
