= Greifswald Power Station =

Cancelled power plant in Germany

- Official name: Kraftwerke Greifswald
- Country: Germany
- Location: Lubmin
- Coordinates: 54°8′26.11″N 13°39′51.92″E
- Status: Abandoned
- Owner: DONG Energy

Thermal power station
- Primary fuel: Coal

Power generation
- Units operational: 2 x 800 MW
- Nameplate capacity: 1,600 MW
- Capacity factor: 47%

Greifswald Power Station (German: Kraftwerke Greifswald) was a coal-fired power plant planned by the Danish energy company DONG Energy near Greifswald, Germany. It was planned to be located in the beach town Lubmin, 15 kilometres (9.3 mi) from Greifswald, in an industrial area which was previously occupied by Greifswald Nuclear Power Plant.

The power plant was to have two units of 800 MW each. It would have an efficiency of 47%.

== Public opinion ==
Within the federal state of Mecklenburg-Vorpommern the plans have met much opposition. A movement against the plan "Bürgerinitiativen Kein Steinkohlekraftwerk in Lubmin" (In English: "Citizen Initiative No Coal Powerplant in Lubmin") has risen. Due to opposition, DONG Energy suspended the project in 2009.
