= STEGAL =

Location
- Country: Germany
- State: Saxony; Thuringia
- Direction: east–west
- Start: Olbernhau (connected to Transgas pipeline)
- Passes through: Rückersdorf (connected to JAGAL pipeline); Erfurt
- To: Reckrod (connected to MIDAL pipeline)

General information
- Type: natural gas
- Operator: Gascade Gastransport GmbH
- Construction started: 1991
- Commissioned: 1992

Technical information
- Length: 314 km (195 mi)
- Diameter: 800 mm (31 in)
- No. of compressor stations: 3
- Compressor stations: Olbernhau; Rückersdorf; Eischleben

STEGAL (Sachsen-Thüringen-Erdgas-Anbindungsleitung) is a natural gas pipeline in Saxony and Thuringia, Germany. It connects the Czech Transgas pipeline at Olbernhau and the JAGAL pipeline (exporting gas from the Yamal–Europe pipeline) at Rückersdorf with the MIDAL pipeline at Reckrod. The pipeline is used for the Russian gas import. The length of STEGAL is 314 kilometres (195 mi) and the diameter of pipe is 800 millimetres (31 in). It is operated by Wingas GmbH & Co. KG.

Construction of the STEGAL pipeline started in 1991 and the pipeline was completed in 1992. In 1999, the JAGAL pipeline was connected with STEGAL at Rückersdorf. In March 2006, the 97-kilometre (60 mi) long STEGAL Loop, parallel to the main pipeline, was commissioned.

Due to increasing demand, the STEGAL ring line was built and put into operation in 2005/2006. This is 97 km long and runs parallel to the STEGAL sections, increasing the capacity of the line by more than 400,000 m^{3} / h.

== See also ==
- NEL pipeline
- OPAL pipeline
- Rehden–Hamburg gas pipeline
- WEDAL
