= Haidach gas storage =

Natural gas storage in Haidach, Austria

Coordinates: 47°59′8.5″N 13°13′50″E

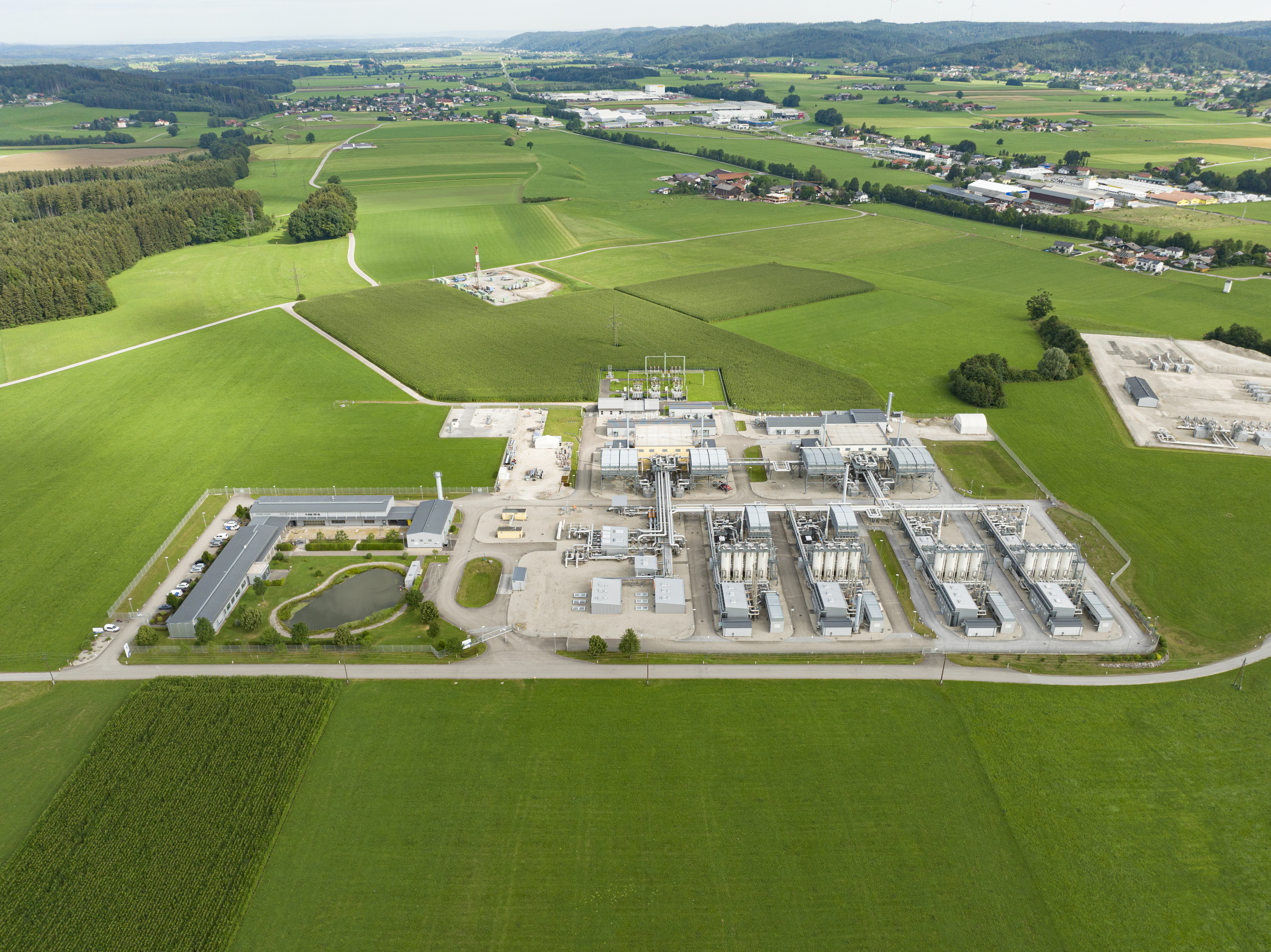
Haidach gas storage

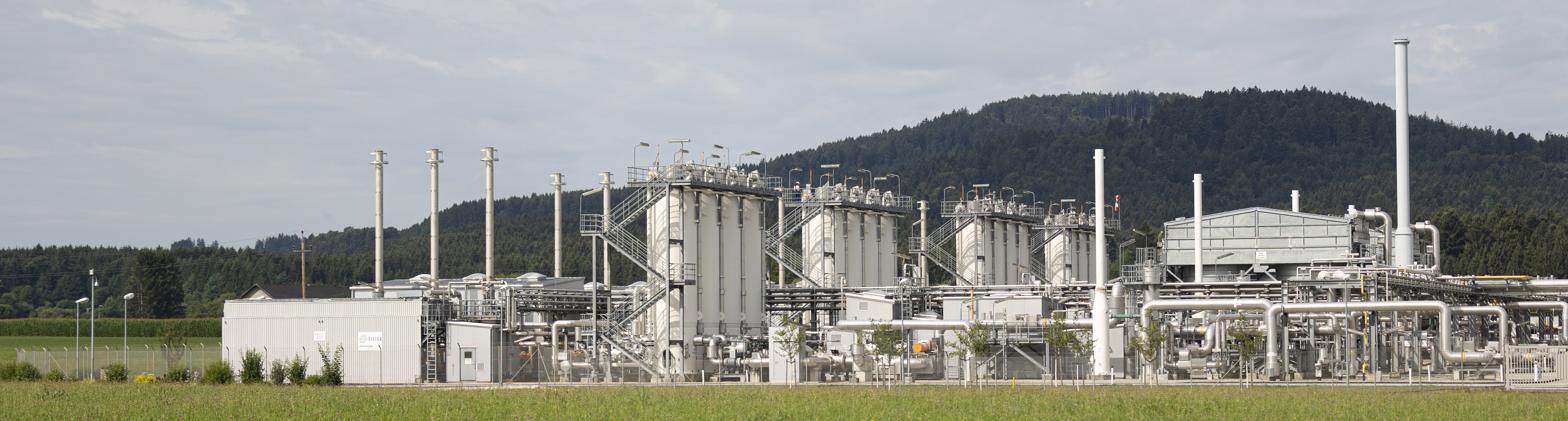
Haidach gas storage from the direction of Straßwalchen

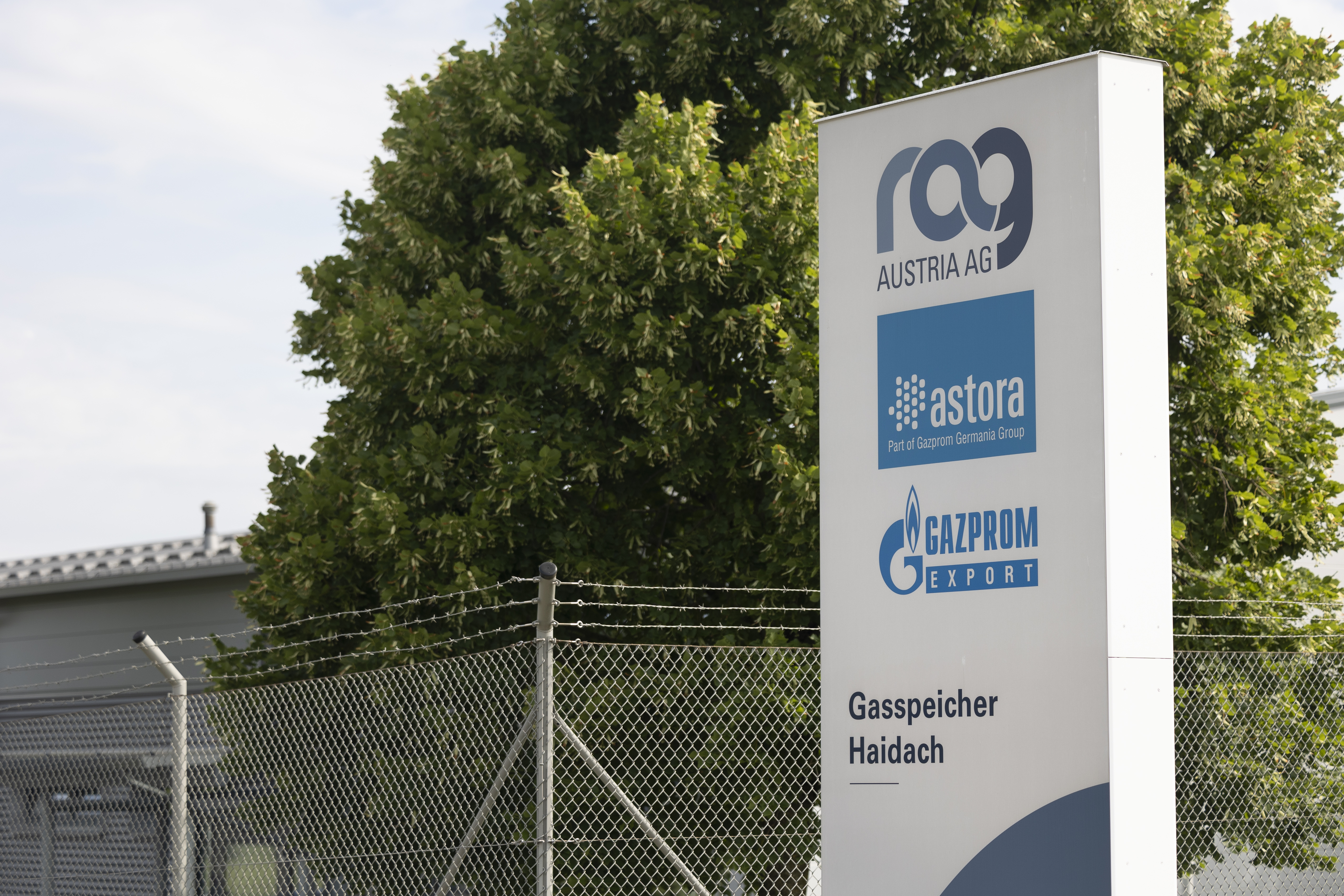
entrance area

Haidach gas storage is an underground natural gas storage in the town of Haidach near Salzburg, Austria. As of the end of 2018 with a capacity of ~2.9 billion cubic meters (bcm) it is the third largest (after Rehden with volume of ~4.7bcm and Bergermeer of ~4.5bcm of capacity) gas storage facility in Central Europe.

== History ==
In 1997, Rohöl-Aufsuchungs Aktiengesellschaft (RAG) discovered the Haidach gas reservoir holding a total gas in place of 4.3 billion cubic meters (bcm). After depletion of the reservoir, it was planned to convert into a gas storage. The contract for use of the Haidach reservoir as a storage for natural gas was signed between RAG, Wingas and Gazprom Export on 13 May 2005. Construction works started in 2005. The gas storage started officially operating on 24 May 2007.

== Technical features ==
Haidach underground gas storage uses depleted Haidach porous sandstone gas reservoir at a depth of 1,600 metres (5,200 ft). The operating capacity of the gas storage in the first phase is 1.2 bcm. In April 2011, after completing the second phase, the operating capacity would be doubled. The gas storage is connected to the Austrian and German gas grids at Burghausen/Überackern through the 39 kilometres (24 mi) long Austria-Bavaria gas pipeline (ABG).

The construction of the first stage cost €250 millions.

== Ownership ==
Haidach gas storage is a joint project of RAG, Wingas, SEFE Storage (Astora) and Gazprom Export (GSA LLC). During April 2021, Gazprom-associated gas storage facilities became unusually low and remained low instead of refilling in the off-peak summer season as usual. In July 2022 the Austrian government gave away Gazprom's portion of the Haidach gas storage facility to RAG Austria for failure to fill it up for the winter season. It is operated by the Austrian energy company EVN.
