= Mladotice =

- Municipality
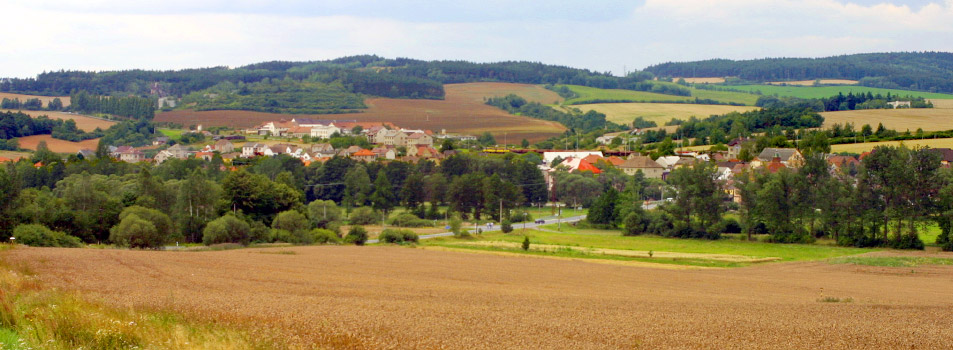
- View from the northeast

- Flag Coat of arms

- Location in the Czech Republic
- Coordinates: 49°59′7″N 13°21′52″E
- Country: Czech Republic
- Region: Plzeň
- District: Plzeň-North
- First mentioned: 1115

Area
  - Total: 22.64 km^{2} (8.74 sq mi)
- Elevation: 365 m (1,198 ft)

Population (2026-01-01)
  - Total: 558
  - Density: 24.6/km^{2} (63.8/sq mi)
- Time zone: UTC+1 (CET)
  - Summer (DST): UTC+2 (CEST)
- Postal code: 331 41
- Website: www.mladotice.cz

Mladotice (German: Mlatz) is a municipality and village in Plzeň-North District in the Plzeň Region of the Czech Republic. It has about 600 inhabitants.

Mladotice lies approximately 27 kilometres (17 mi) north of Plzeň and 77 km (48 mi) west of Prague.

== Administrative division ==
Mladotice consists of four municipal parts (in brackets population according to the 2021 census):

- Mladotice (421)
- Černá Hať (24)
- Chrášťovice (87)
- Strážiště (27)

== History ==
The first written mention of Mladotice is from 1115, when it belonged to the Kladruby Monastery. Later it became a property of the monastery in Plasy, which owned Mladotice until the abolishment of the monastery in 1785.

== Demographics ==
Historical population
Year	Pop.	±%
1869	750	—
1880	722	−3.7%
1890	773	+7.1%
1900	768	−0.6%
1910	854	+11.2%
1921	848	−0.7%
1930	881	+3.9%
1950	715	−18.8%
1961	749	+4.8%
1970	696	−7.1%
1980	663	−4.7%
1991	599	−9.7%
2001	565	−5.7%
2011	562	−0.5%
2021	559	−0.5%
Source: Censuses
