= Sülstorf =

- Municipality
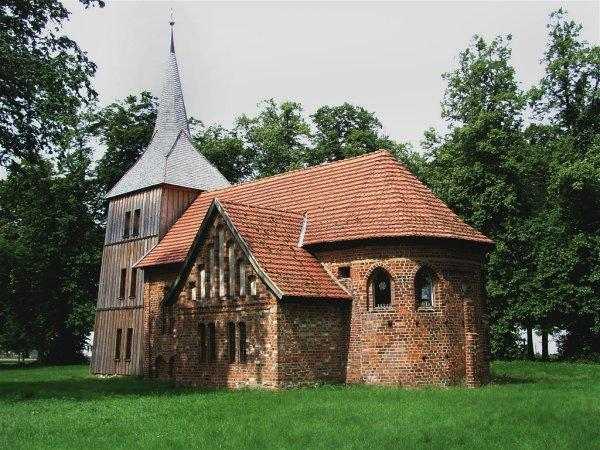
- Church in Sülstorf

- Coat of arms

- Location of Sülstorf within Ludwigslust-Parchim district
- Interactive map of Sülstorf
- Location within Germany Location within Mecklenburg-Vorpommern
- Coordinates: 53°31′N 11°22′E
- Country: Germany
- State: Mecklenburg-Vorpommern
- District: Ludwigslust-Parchim
- Municipal assoc.: Ludwigslust-Land
- Subdivisions: 3

Government
  - Mayor: Horst Busse

Area
  - Total: 18.64 km^{2} (7.20 sq mi)
- Elevation: 44 m (144 ft)

Population (2025-12-31)
  - Total: 826
  - Density: 44.3/km^{2} (115/sq mi)
- Time zone: UTC+01:00 (CET)
  - Summer (DST): UTC+02:00 (CEST)
- Postal codes: 19077
- Dialling codes: 03865
- Vehicle registration: LWL
- Website: http://www.gemeinde-suelstorf.de/

Sülstorf is a municipality in the Ludwigslust-Parchim district, in Mecklenburg-Vorpommern, Germany.

Sülstorf includes the centers of Boldela and Sülte.
