= Greifswald Nuclear Power Plant =

Decommissioned nuclear power plant located in Lubmin, Germany

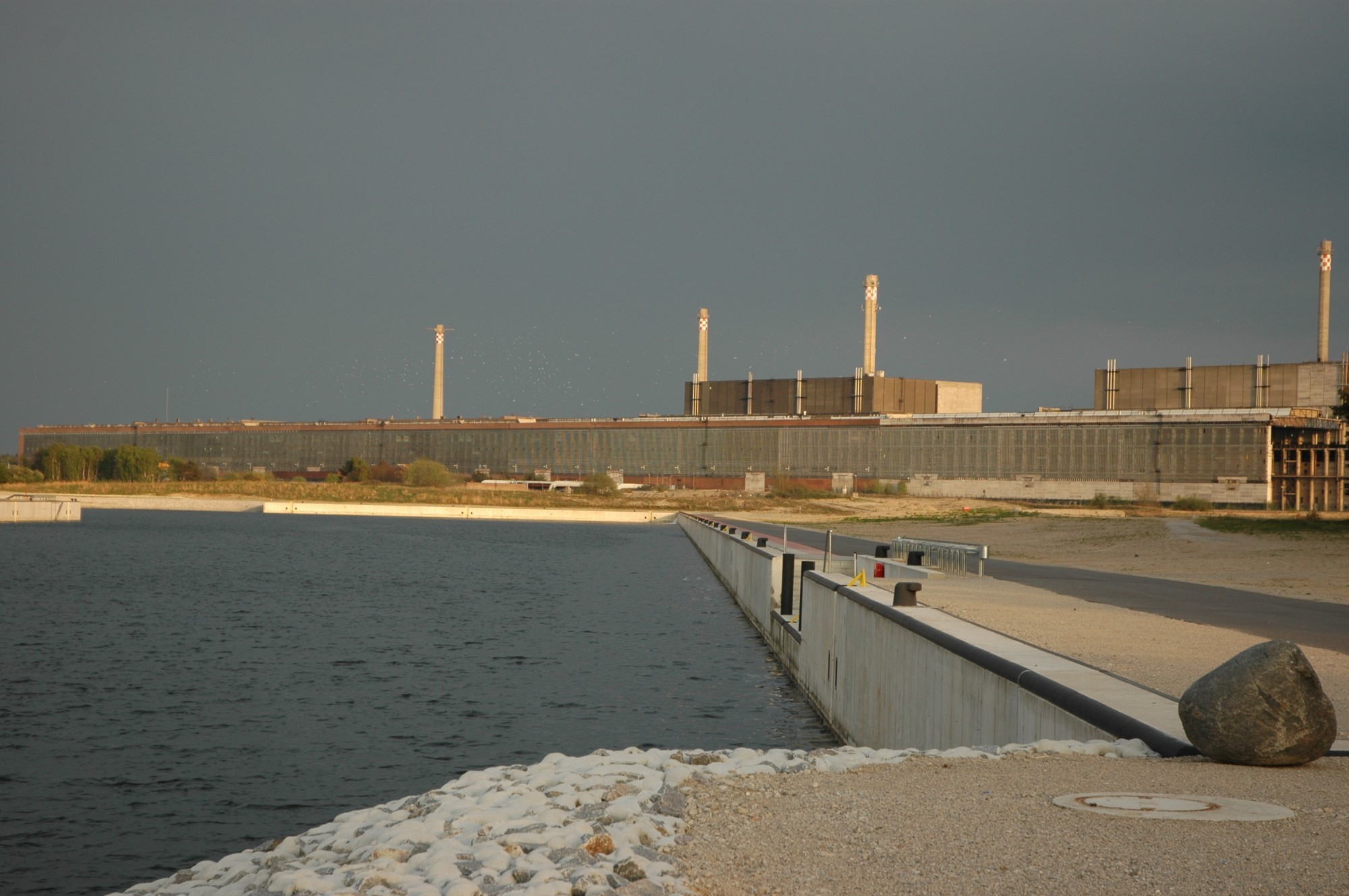
- Several of the units of the Greifswald NPP
- Country: Germany, previously East Germany
- Location: Greifswald
- Coordinates: 54°8′26.11″N 13°39′51.92″E
- Status: Decommissioned
- Construction began: 1967
- Commission date: 12 July 1974
- Decommission date: 22 July 1990
- Operator: Energiewerke Nord

Nuclear power station
- Reactor type: VVER
- Reactor supplier: Atomenergoexport; Škoda

Power generation
- Make and model: Škoda; Electrosila
- Units decommissioned: 5 x 440 MW
- Capacity factor: 55.4%
- Annual net output: 10,678 GWh

External links
- Commons: Related media on Commons

Greifswald nuclear power station (German: Kernkraftwerk Greifswald, KKW Greifswald), also known as Lubmin nuclear power station or KGR, was the largest nuclear power station in East Germany before it was shut down shortly after the German reunification. The plant's reactors were of the VVER-440/V-230 type, which was the second generation of Soviet-designed reactors. The plant is located in Lubmin near Greifswald, in the state of Mecklenburg-Vorpommern.

When operational, the plant provided roughly one third of East Germany's energy needs. As of 2024, around 1000 workers continue to work on the site 35 years later for decommissioning purposes.

== History ==
=== Construction of the Nuclear Power Plant (Units 1 to 4) ===
Even before the completion and commissioning of the GDR's first Industrial 70 MW experimental reactor in Rheinsberg in 1966, a government agreement was concluded on July 14, 1965, between the GDR and the USSR for the construction of a second nuclear power plant with approximately 2,000 MW of electrical output on the territory of the GDR, as well as the delivery of the nuclear components from the USSR.

As part of a site selection process, Lubmin, near Greifswald, was favored. Reasons for this included the year-round, sufficient supply of cooling water from the Baltic Sea, the low agricultural value of the land, and the low population density, which were intended to reduce the impact of an accident. On the other hand, the great distance between northern GDR and the electricity consumption centers in the south, and the resulting higher transmission losses, were drawbacks.

Site development began in 1967, and construction of four VVER-440/230 reactor units started in 1969. The main contractor was VEB BMK Kohle und Energie. Construction of the first four units was completed within the internationally accepted timeframe. However, at the 14th session of the SED Central Committee, held from December 9 to 11, 1970, it was criticized that the project costs were double the projected estimate. Industrial operation began in 1974 with Unit 1, in 1975 with Unit 2, in 1978 with Unit 3, and in 1979 with Unit 4. From then on, the first four units covered approximately 10% of the GDR's electricity needs. The VVER reactor type used is a water-cooled, water-moderated reactor, whose operation is fundamentally analogous to "Western" light water reactors.

== Closure ==
In late 1989, nuclear regulatory bodies of countries operating VVER plants found the need to fit many new safety systems, which were stated to have been necessary in almost all areas. All East German reactors were closed soon after reunification, with restarting conditional on compliance with the stricter West German safety standards.

Convinced that upgrading to the new safety standards was not economically feasible, the new unified German government decided in early 1991 to decommission the four active units, close unit 5, which was under test at the time, and halt construction of the rest of the facility's units as well as two VVER-1000s being built at the Stendal Nuclear Power Plant.

The district heating supplied by the plant was replaced by oil imports and in 1995 by a new natural gas plant. Decommissioning of units 1 through 5 began in 1995, making Greifswald one of the first nuclear power stations in Germany to go through the process. The plant came into focus again in 1996 when it was decided to move 235 unspent fuel assemblies to the Hungarian Paks Nuclear Power Plant, which is of the same design.

At its peak, the plant employed around 10,000 full-time workers; around 1,000 are working on decommissioning and other activities at the site.

== Incidents ==
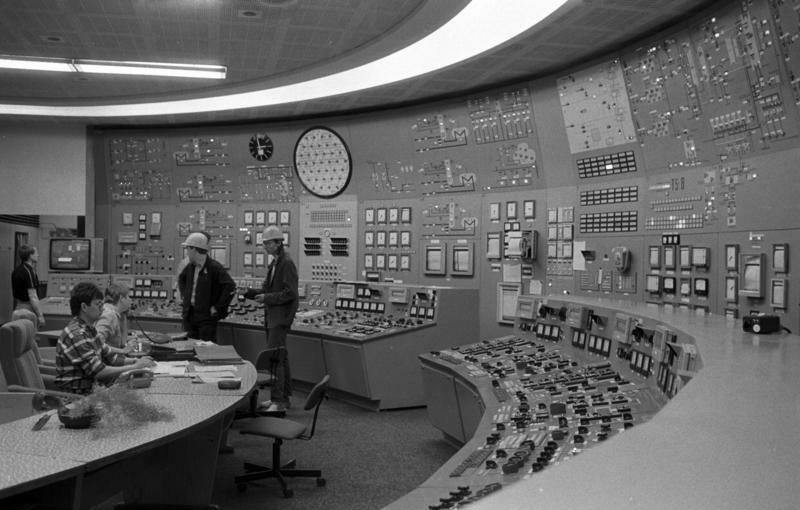
Greifswald control room in 1990

- 7 December 1975 - An electrician wanted to show his apprentice how to bridge electrical circuits. He decided to short-circuit the primary winding on one of the Unit 1 pumps by developing an arc following the edge of a wiring loom. The fire in the main trough destroyed the current supply and the control lines of five of the unit's six main coolant pumps. The fire was quickly brought under control by the fire-brigade and the pumps were temporarily repaired. After this near-disaster, fire protection within the power station was substantially strengthened and separate electrical lines for each pump were introduced. The incident was only made public in 1989. A few hours after the incident the IAEA was informed by Soviet authorities, which classified the accident under INES 4, later revised to INES 3.
- 24 November 1989 - Three out of six cooling water pumps were switched off for a test. A fourth pump broke down and control of the reactor was lost; ten fuel elements were damaged and the reactor was close to melting down. The accident was reportedly attributed to sticky relay contacts.

== Reactor summary ==
| Unit | Type | Net Power | Gross Power | Start of construction | Construction completed | Commercial operation | Shut down |
|---|---|---|---|---|---|---|---|
| Greifswald - 1 (KGR 1) | VVER-440/230 | 408 MW | 440 MW | 1 March 1970 | 17 December 1973 | 12 July 1974 | 14 February 1990 |
| Greifswald - 2 (KGR 2) | VVER-440/230 | 408 MW | 440 MW | 1 March 1970 | 23 December 1974 | 16 April 1975 | 14 February 1990 |
| Greifswald - 3 (KGR 3) | VVER-440/230 | 408 MW | 440 MW | 1 April 1972 | 24 October 1977 | 1 May 1978 | 28 February 1990 |
| Greifswald - 4 (KGR 4) | VVER-440/230 | 408 MW | 440 MW | 1 April 1972 | 3 September 1979 | 1 November 1979 | 22 July 1990 |
| Greifswald - 5 (KGR 5) | VVER-440/213 | 408 MW | 440 MW | 1 December 1976 | 24 April 1989 | 1 November 1989 | 24 November 1989 |
| Greifswald - 6 (KGR 6) | VVER-440/213 | 408 MW | 440 MW | | Finished, never operated | - | - |
| Greifswald - 7 (KGR 7) | VVER-440/213 | 408 MW | 440 MW | | Canceled | - | - |
| Greifswald - 8 (KGR 8) | VVER-440/213 | 408 MW | 440 MW | | Canceled | - | - |

== See also ==
- Nuclear power in Germany
- Repository for radioactive waste Morsleben

Nuclear plants built in the former East Germany

- Stendal Nuclear Power Plant
- Rheinsberg Nuclear Power Plant
