= Bunde, Germany =

Bunde
- Municipality
- Coat of arms

- Location of Bunde within Leer district
- Interactive map of Bunde
- Location within Germany Location within Lower Saxony
- Coordinates: 53°11′N 7°16′E
- Country: Germany
- State: Lower Saxony
- District: Leer
- Subdivisions: 5 districts

Government
  - Mayor (2021–26): Uwe Sap (SPD)

Area
  - Total: 120.95 km^{2} (46.70 sq mi)
- Elevation: 2 m (6.6 ft)

Population (2025-12-31)
  - Total: 7,388
  - Density: 61.08/km^{2} (158.2/sq mi)
- Time zone: UTC+01:00 (CET)
  - Summer (DST): UTC+02:00 (CEST)
- Postal codes: 26831
- Dialling codes: 0 49 53
- Vehicle registration: LER
- Website: www.gemeinde-bunde.de

Bunde (German pronunciation: [ˈbʊndə]) is a municipal district in East Frisia, in Lower Saxony, Germany, about 20 km (12 mi) south of Emden, Germany, and 50 km (30 mi) east of Groningen, Netherlands. It lies on the southern tip of the Dollart, a bay of the North Sea between Germany and the Netherlands, and has a land border with the Netherlands.

Bunde is among the smaller districts of East Frisia, with a population of 7,607 (as of 2015). About half live in the town of Bunde itself. The district's population density is comparatively low at 62/km^{2} (160/sq mi), compared with 228/km^{2} (590/sq mi) for Germany as a whole. In the 17th and 18th centuries, sizeable areas of the district were wrested from the sea by the creation of polders.

Bunde's economy centers on agriculture and tourism. The community has been officially recognized as a resort town since 1998. Many of the town's residents commute to jobs elsewhere, notably in Leer, about 13 km (8 mi) to the east. Residents include a number of Dutch nationals, most of whom commute to jobs in the Netherlands.

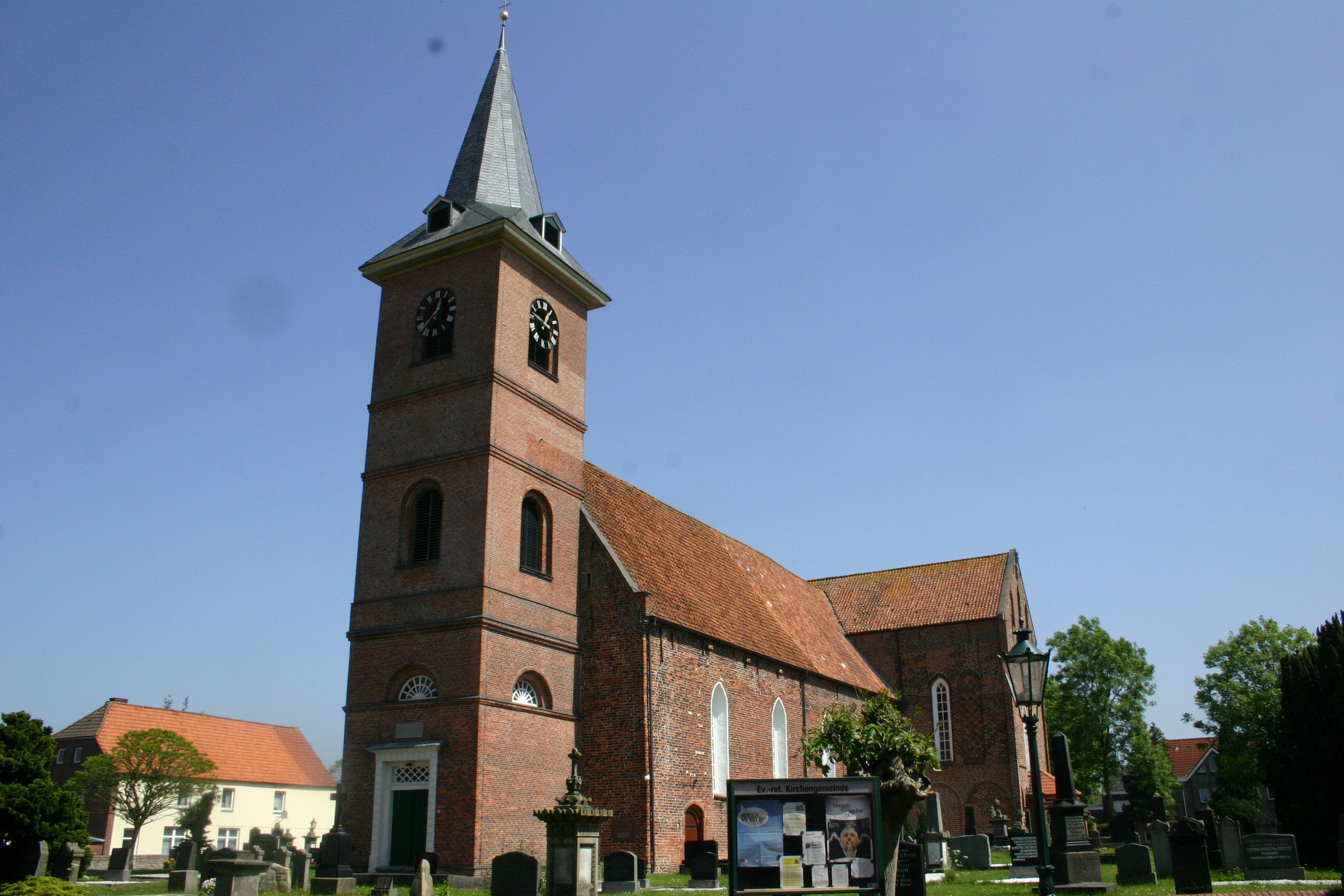
Reformed Church, Bunde

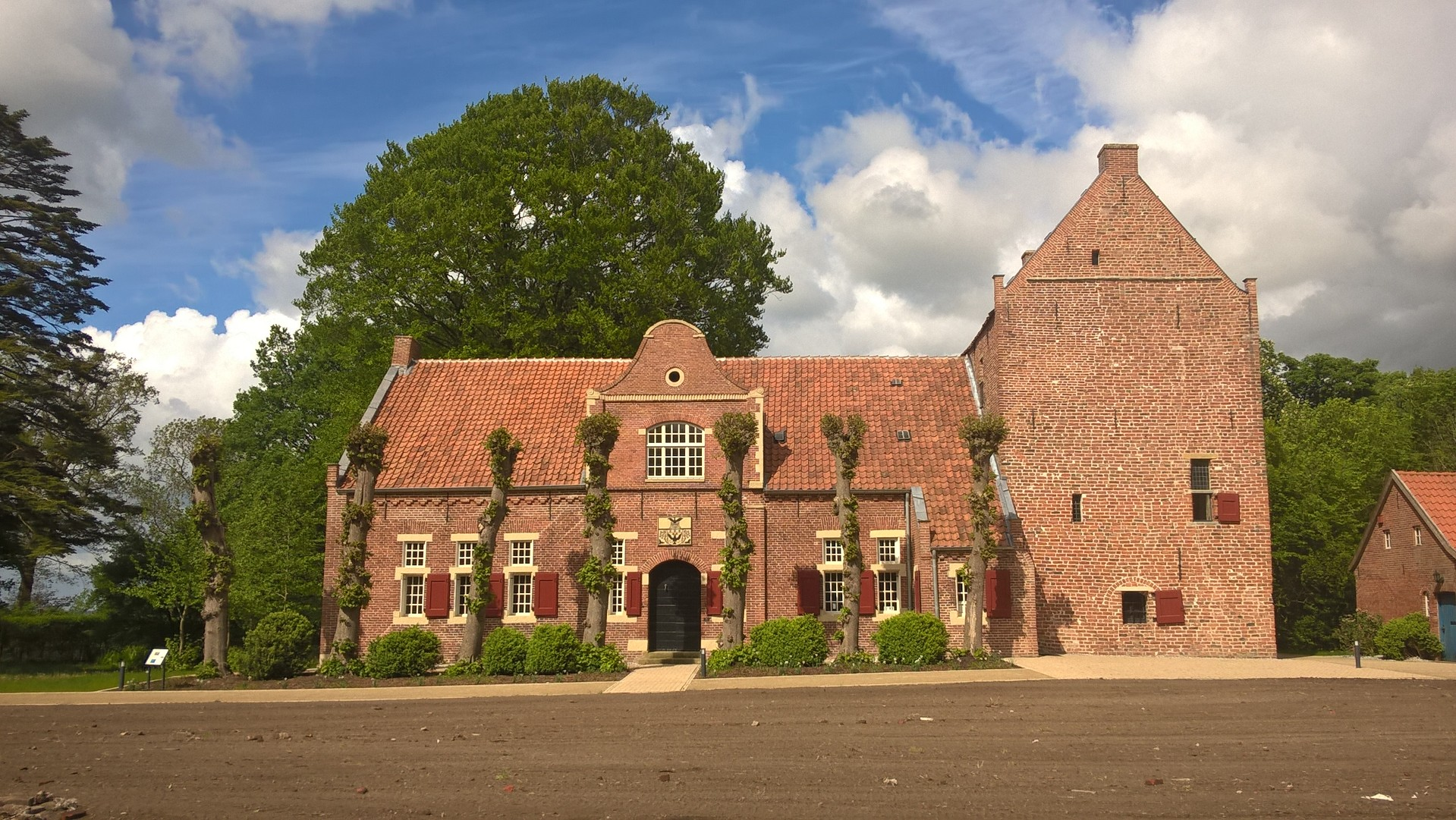
Steinhaus Bunderhee, Bunde

The town's cultural artifacts include the Reformed Church (Reformierte Kreuzkirche), the nave of which dates from the 13th century, and the red brick Steinhaus Bunderhee castle, which dates from the 14th century.

== History ==
Bunde was first mentioned in a document in 1428. The name has been variously written as Buenda, de Bunda and Bonde. Due to its situation on a geest, or slightly raised landform, the town was spared the great floods that inundated much of the region in the Middle Ages.

Prior to the Reformation, Bunde belonged to the Roman Catholic Diocese of Münster. Bunde became predominantly Protestant in the early 16th century, largely following the Reformed (Calvinist) faith as in the adjacent Netherlands. During the Thirty Years' War (1618–1648), Bunde, though not a battlefield, was plundered several times by Imperial (Catholic) troops.

East Frisia became part of the Kingdom of Prussia in 1744. Thereafter, crafts and cottage industries came to the fore in the region's economy. During the Seven Years' War (1756–1763), the town was twice occupied by French troops, and was subjected to tributes by the conquerors. After the war, Prussian King Frederick the Great sponsored construction of dikes to expand the region's polders.

Bunde's first rail link came after the unification of Germany in 1871. A spur to the Ihrhove–Nieuweschans railway from Leer to Bad Nieuweschans, Netherlands, was opened in 1876. In the late 19th century the district saw a sizeable immigration of residents to the U.S., primarily for economic and religious reasons. Early in the 20th-century dairies began to proliferate, and canneries were built to can local crops of beans and peas.

As elsewhere in Germany following World War I, economic dislocation and unemployment rose in the 1920s, boosting the appeal of Nazism, especially in rural areas of the district. Nevertheless, the Social Democrats retained a sizeable following in the town until the Nazi seizure of power in January 1933. By mid-1934, however, all non-Nazi political organizations in Germany were repressed and outlawed.

Bunde's Jewish community had built a synagogue and primary school in Bunde in the mid-19th century, but with the advent of Nazism and the Holocaust, the community was suppressed and many members were killed. The last Jewish resident of Bunde was deported to Theresienstadt concentration camp in July 1942.

In April 1945, Bunde was the first East Frisian town to be liberated, being occupied initially by Canadian and Polish forces. Although various buildings were damaged by artillery fire, casualties among the population were few.

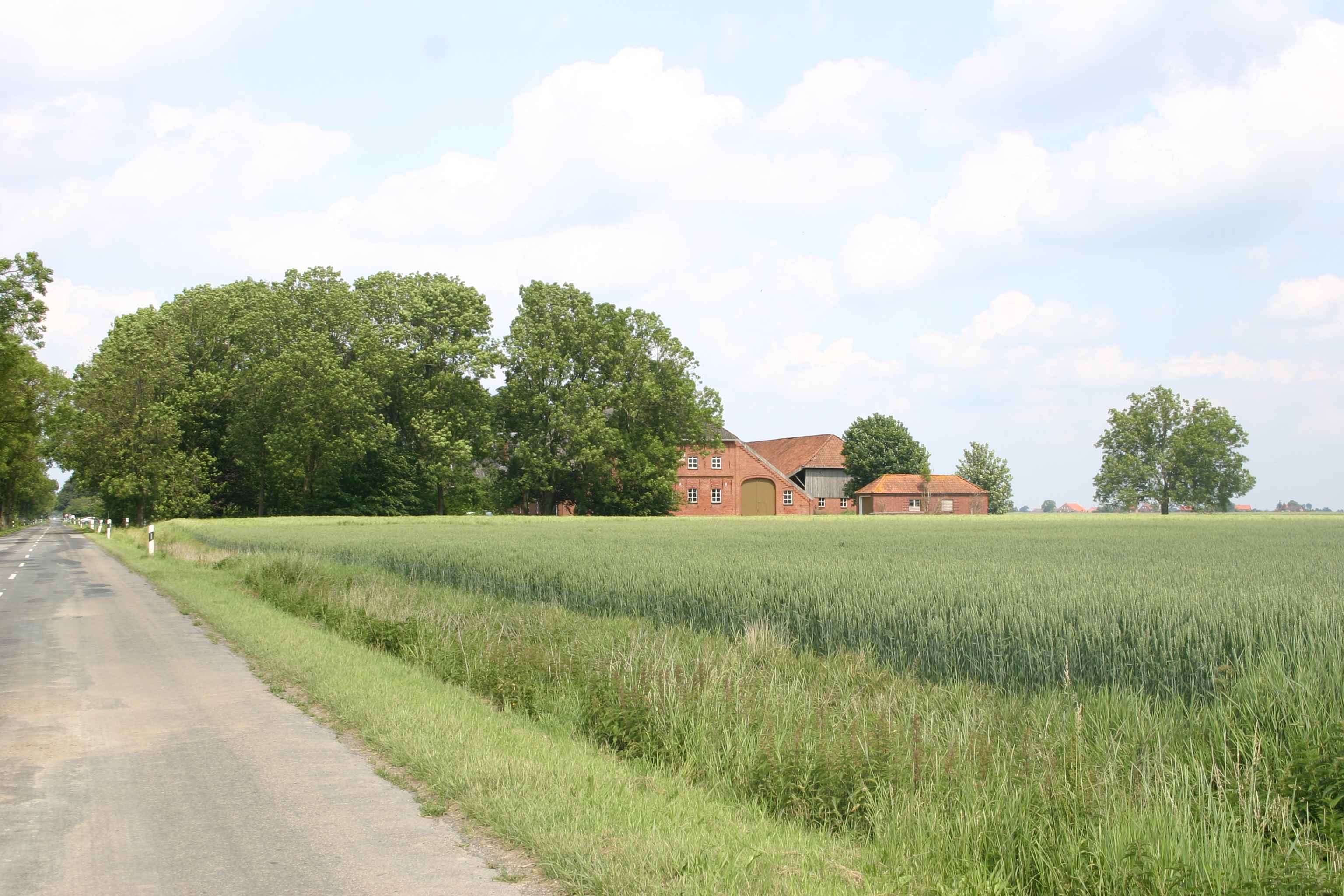
Polder land with farm buildings.

After the war, the district hosted an influx of German refugees expelled from territories east of the Oder–Neisse line under border changes promulgated at the Potsdam Conference. Later, however, due in part to increasing mechanization of agriculture, the district's population declined, sinking from a peak of 8,893 in 1950 to 7,607 in 2015.

== Tourism ==
The relatively remote district began to appeal to tourists in the 1980s. Some were attracted by its unspoiled polder landscapes and antique windmills, others by opportunities for cycling and canoeing, and for bird-watching.
