= Lubmin =

- Municipality
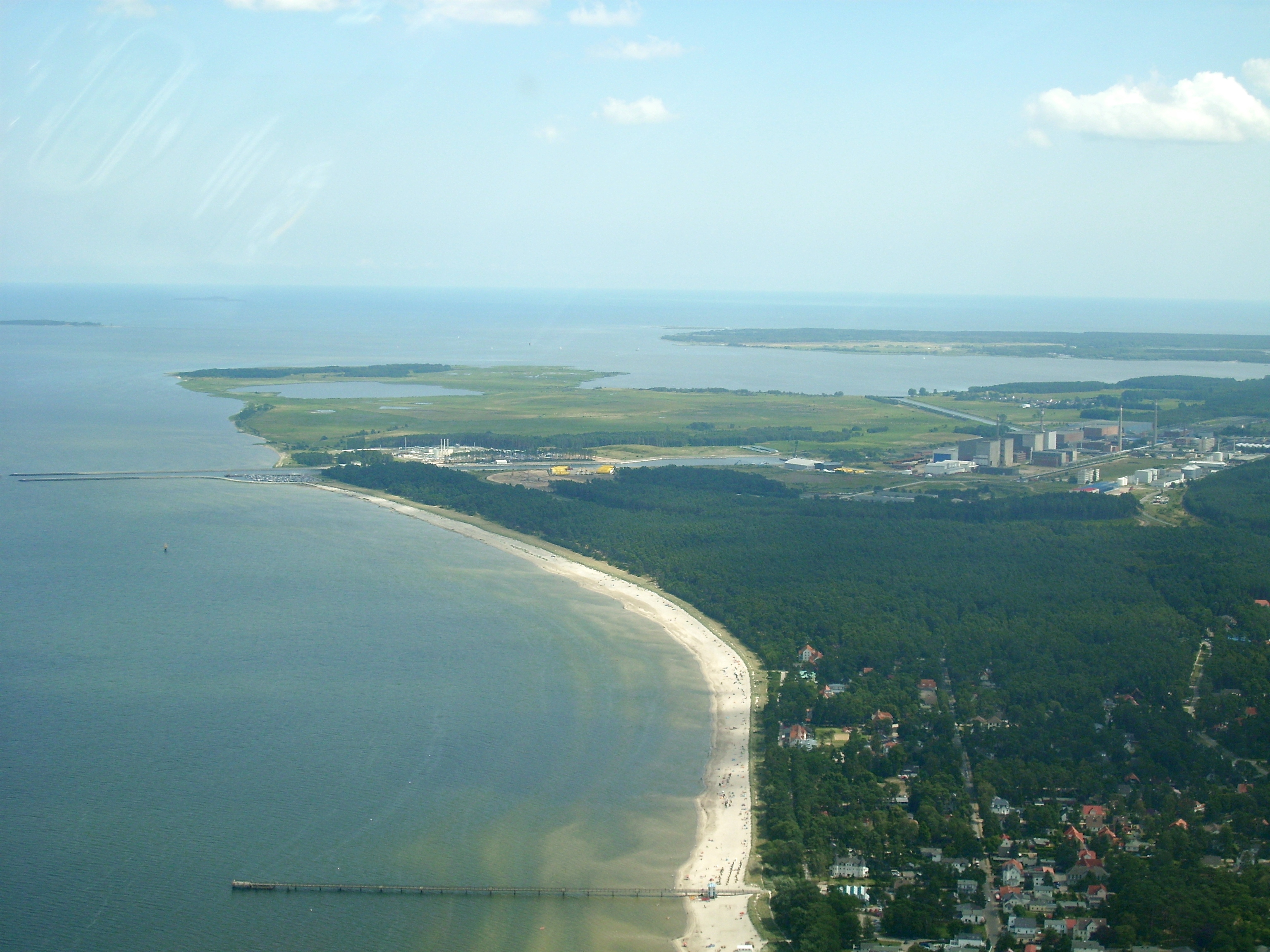

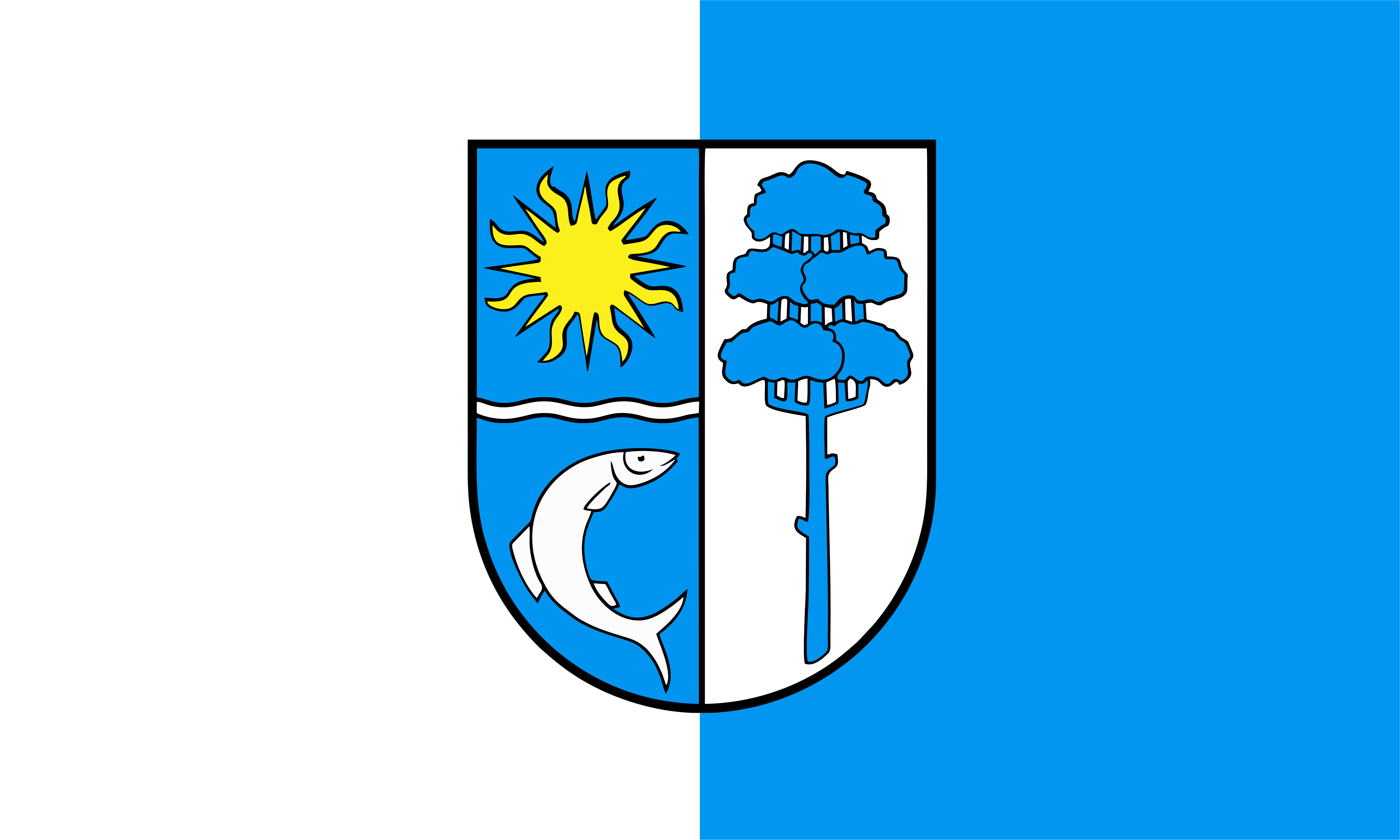
- Flag Coat of arms

- Location of Lubmin within Vorpommern-Greifswald district
- Interactive map of Lubmin
- Location within Germany Location within Mecklenburg-Vorpommern
- Coordinates: 54°07′59″N 13°36′51″E
- Country: Germany
- State: Mecklenburg-Vorpommern
- District: Vorpommern-Greifswald
- Municipal assoc.: Lubmin

Government
  - Mayor: Axel Vogt

Area
  - Total: 13.88 km^{2} (5.36 sq mi)
- Elevation: 5 m (16 ft)

Population (2025-12-31)
  - Total: 2,259
  - Density: 162.8/km^{2} (421.5/sq mi)
- Time zone: UTC+01:00 (CET)
  - Summer (DST): UTC+02:00 (CEST)
- Postal codes: 17509
- Dialling codes: 038354
- Vehicle registration: VG
- Website: www.lubmin.de

Lubmin (German pronunciation: [lʊpˈmiːn]) is a coastal resort in the German state of Mecklenburg-Vorpommern. Lubmin is situated near Greifswald and on the Bay of Greifswald.

Apart from tourism, Lubmin is a major transport and industry hub and investment location in the German energy sector. Both the Nord Stream 1 gas pipeline from Russia (by Gazprom and E.ON) and several power plants (by Ørsted A/S and EnBW) are under construction. Moreover, Lubmin is the administrative seat of Amt Lubmin, to which nine other municipalities belong.

== Geographical location ==
To the north of Lubmin lies the Bay of Greifswald. The northeast edge of the municipality consists of the Struck peninsula which is bounded by the mouth of the Peenestrom delta. The seaside resort has a kilometer-long sand beach and is largely covered by pine woods.

== Neighbouring municipalities ==
Lubmin's immediate neighbouring municipalities are Kröslin and Rubenow to the southeast, Wusterhusen to the south and Brünzow to the southwest. Somewhat further away is the university town of Greifswald to the west and to the south is the municipality of Wolgast.

== History ==
The earliest written record of the name Lubmin is in 1271. The place name Lubemyn is of Slavic origin and until the Reformation referred to Eldena monastery.

According to tradition the village was badly affected by the All Saints' Flood of 1304: a strong wind from the southwest depressed water in the bodden before finally swinging northeast. The water deluged the Pomeranian coast and caused heavy damage. In 1309, Duke Bogislav IV transferred Lubmin to the Cistercian abbey of Eldena in the wake of the Reformation.

As a result of the Thirty Years' War, Lubmin, like all of Western Pomerania, became part of the Dominion of Swedish Pomerania. Around 1700 the town came into the possession of the Swedish field marshal Fabian Graf von Wrangel. At the 1815 Congress of Vienna the territory was ceded to Prussia.

In 1886 Lubmin was referred to for the first time as a "seaside resort".

It was not until 1893 that Lubmin became connected to the road from Eldena to Wolgast. A light railway running from Greifswald via Lubmin to Wolgast was opened in 1898. In 1945 the line was dismantled and handed to the Soviet Union as war reparations. The first pier was built around 1900. In 1969 construction work commenced on the nuclear power station and in consequence a railway line was built from Greifswald to Lubmin. The unfinished (4 of 8 reactors were producing power and the unfinished 4 were part of an upgrade project started in the 1980s) power station was shut down shortly after German reunification. In 1992 a new pier was completed, and several hotels and restaurants constructed, thus underlining the status of the town as a seaside resort.

After the Second World War, Lubmin was part of Rostock district, and since 1990 part of the federal state of Mecklenburg-Western Pomerania.

== Traffic ==
Development of the municipality is facilitated by a state highway from Greifswald to Wolgast passing through Lubmin. An additional highway runs from Lubmin to Wusterhusen. Lubmin also possesses a railway connection, though it no longer carries passengers. Since 2004 the municipality has featured a large Baltic Sea port (however this has not yet been officially opened). The port was constructed from the discharge channel of the former nuclear power station.

== Industry ==
A large part of the municipal area of Lubmin was occupied by the GDR's largest nuclear power station, Greifswald Nuclear Power Plant. The first of its four reactors went into operation in 1973. An additional four nuclear reactors were constructed in the building; however Block 5 and 6, completed in 1989, had only progressed to trials before the entire plant was shut down in 1990 due to tightened safety standards. Block 6 was transformed into a museum and is today open for visitors.

Nuclear power opponents fear that the Federal nuclear waste facility (operated by Energiewerke Nord GmbH) could be used to serve all of Europe. Fears have been raised over potential damage to the coastal landscape and the quality of the traffic route has been criticized. At present it is disputed in Lubmin whether the focus of the municipality is to concentrate on the industrial settlement or on the previously neglected tourist industry.

Three power plants were planned to be constructed in Lubmin to support the Nord Stream 1 Russo–German gas pipeline ending nearby. The Danish energy company DONG Energy planned the Kraftwerke Greifswald, a multifuel, 2 × 800 MW power plant, in 2006. Some feared that the resulting increase in the temperature of the Baltic Sea could damage the sea's ecosystem. DONG Energy abandoned the project in 2009.

In 2022, a liquified natural gas regasification reception terminal started sending gas onshore, supplied via smaller transfer vessels from a floating production storage and offloading ship further offshore.
