= Rehden =

- Municipality
- Location of Rehden within Diepholz district
- Interactive map of Rehden
- Location within Germany Location within Lower Saxony
- Coordinates: 52°36′32″N 08°28′52″E
- Country: Germany
- State: Lower Saxony
- District: Diepholz
- Municipal assoc.: Rehden
- Subdivisions: 3 Ortsteile

Government
  - Mayor: Wilhelm Grelle

Area
  - Total: 33.35 km^{2} (12.88 sq mi)
- Elevation: 34–77 m (112–253 ft)

Population (2025-12-31)
  - Total: 2,210
  - Density: 66.3/km^{2} (172/sq mi)
- Time zone: UTC+01:00 (CET)
  - Summer (DST): UTC+02:00 (CEST)
- Postal codes: 49453
- Dialling codes: 05446
- Vehicle registration: DH
- Website: www.rehden.de

Rehden (German pronunciation: [ˈʁeːdn̩]) is a municipality in the district of Diepholz, in Lower Saxony, Germany. It is situated approximately eight km east of Diepholz. The 44 TWh Rehden natural gas storage facility connects to the Rehden–Hamburg gas pipeline.

Rehden is also the seat of the Samtgemeinde ("collective municipality") Rehden.

== See also ==
- Rehden Geest Moor, a local nature reserve
