= JAGAL =

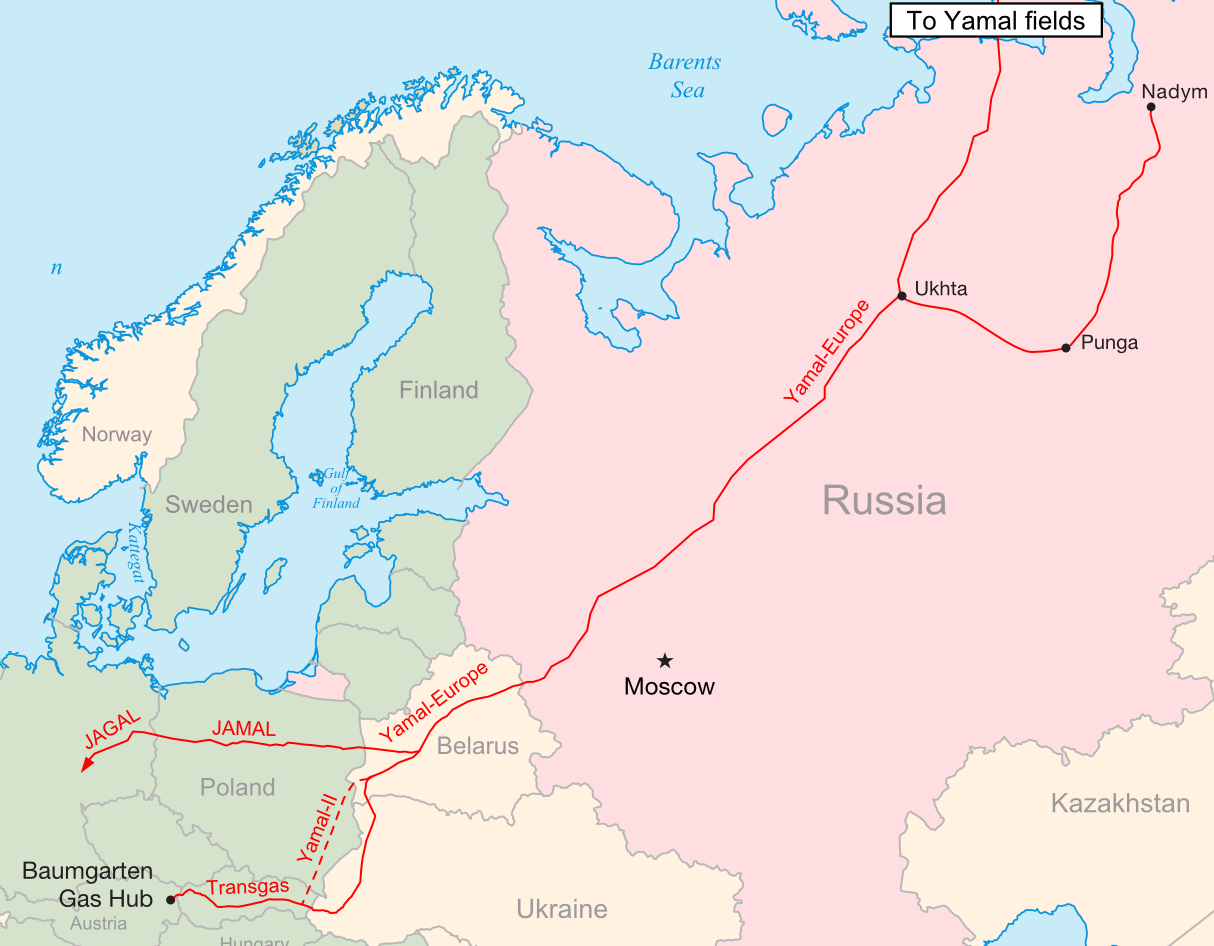
- Yamal-Europe pipeline
- Location of JAGAL

Location
- Country: Germany
- State: Brandenburg; Thuringia
- Direction: north–south
- Start: Lebus (connected to Yamal-Europe pipeline)
- Passes through: Mallnow; Baruth/Mark; Bernau bei Berlin
- To: Rückersdorf (connected to STEGAL pipeline)

General information
- Type: natural gas
- Operator: Gascade Gastransport GmbH
- Construction started: 1995
- Commissioned: 1999

Technical information
- Length: 338 km (210 mi)
- Maximum discharge: 24 billion cubic meters per year
- Diameter: 1,200 mm (47 in)
- No. of compressor stations: 1
- Compressor stations: Mallnow

JAGAL (Jamal-Gas-Anbindungsleitung) is a German section of the Yamal-Europe pipeline. The pipeline is used for the Russian natural gas import and it is owned and operated by Gascade Gastransport GmbH. It runs from the Polish–German border at Lebus near Frankfurt (Oder) to Rückersdorf. In Rückersdorf JAGAL is connected with STEGAL pipeline carrying gas further west. In Bernau JAGAL is connected with the Verbundnetz Gas AG-operated long-distance gas pipeline No. 302.

Construction of the JAGAL pipeline started in 1995, when a double duct between Lebus and Górzyca in Poland was laid under Oder and 11-kilometre (6.8 mi) long connection from Lebus to Mallnow compressor station was built. This section was completed in 1996. The 97-kilometre (60 mi) second section of JAGAL from Mallnow to Baruth/Mark was completed in 1997. 230-kilometre (140 mi) JAGAL II from Baruth to Rückersdorf was constructed in 1999. The section from the border to Mallnow has a diameter of 1,400 millimetres (55 in) while rest of the pipeline has a diameter of 1,400 millimetres (55 in). It has a capacity of 840 billion cubic feet (24×10^{9} m^{3}) of natural gas per year.

== See also ==
- MEGAL
- OPAL pipeline
