= SEFE Energy =

Gas trading company based in Germany

- Company type: subsidiary
- Founded: 1993
- Founder: Wintershall; Gazprom
- Headquarters: Kassel, Germany
- Revenue: €12.59 billion
- Number of employees: 550
- Parent: Securing Energy for Europe
- Website: www.sefe-energy.eu

SEFE Energy is a gas distribution company located in Kassel, Germany. It is a subsidiary of Securing Energy for Europe.

== History ==
Wingas was established in 1993 by BASF subsidiary Wintershall and Gazprom. Since 25 October 2007, Wintershall owned 50% plus one share, while Gazprom's stock is 50% less one share. In December 2013, Wintershall and Gazprom agreed an assets swap which made Wingas a wholly owned subsidiary of Gazprom. BASF and Gazprom completed the swap of assets by September 30, 2015.

== Operations ==
SEFE Energy operates in Germany, Belgium, Denmark, France, the United Kingdom, Austria, the Netherlands and the Czech Republic. In Germany, it has a 20% market share.

Wingas's subsidiary Astora GmbH & Co. KG operates the Western Europe largest natural gas storage facility in Rehden, North Germany, with a working gas volume of 4.4 billion cubic metres (160 billion cubic feet) and represents roughly a fifth of the entire storage capacity in Germany. Another large gas storage facility with capacity of 2.6 billion cubic metres (92 billion cubic feet) is the Haidach gas storage. In 2004 Wingas purchased the Saltfleetby Gas Field in the United Kingdom, which is operated by Wingas Storage UK and is used for gas storage.

Besides natural gas, Wingas leases the free transmission capacity in fiber-optic cables to commercial customers.
