= Corinne B. Grace =

American actress

Corinne B. Grace (née Bissette, November 9, 1929 - August 23, 2016) was an American actress and oil and gas producer based out of New Mexico. She had been instrumental in the Federal Energy Regulatory Commission (FERC) reassessing the new federal regulations allowing pipelines to cancel oil and gas producer contracts as was seen in Corinne B. Grace v. El Paso Natural Gas Company. She was also instrumental in protecting stripper wells (wells with small volumes of gas production) as well as being supportive of state interpretations of FERC regulations as was seen in Transwestern Pipeline Company v. Corinne Grace. She also was part of the tax law theory of equitable recoupment being applied to city revenue from leased property with the court case of Grace v. City of Carlsbad.

== Early life and career ==
Grace was born Corinne Bissette on November 9, 1929, in Zebulon, North Carolina. Her parents were Oscar Bissette and Dolly Massey Bissette. She grew up during The Great Depression. She graduated from the University of North Carolina, Greensboro. After graduating, she pursued a career in theatre. She went on to play Manny Davis in Twin Beds at the WRVA Theater in Richmond, Virginia and later work in two commercials, one for Blue Bonnet Bread and the other for Beacon Wax.

In 1954, she married theater producer Michael P. Grace II. The wedding was held at Michael Grace's alma mater, the University of Notre Dame at the university's chapel of the Sacred Heart. They would both later start a career in oil and gas production.

== Oil and Gas Production ==
Starting 1960, Michael and Corinne Grace started an oil and gas company in Southeast New Mexico. They were involved in various oil and gas operations. After her divorce in 1982, she was involved in the following hearings at FERC which affected the oil and gas industry:

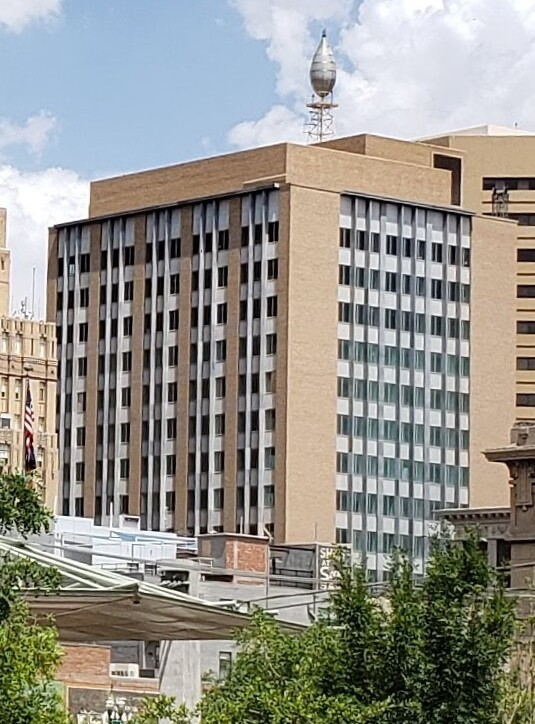
- The El Paso Natural Gas building
  Corinne B. Grace v. El Paso Natural Gas Company
- Transwestern Pipeline Company v. Corinne Grace

=== Corinne B. Grace v. El Paso Natural Gas ===
In the 1990 hearing against El Paso Natural Gas, the effects of the then recent Natural Gas Wellhead Deregulation Act of 1989 were called into question. Although Grace did not win the case, FERC made the following statement:

Order No. 490 was never intended to be an unconstrained grant of regulatory authority to interstate pipelines to terminate and abandon small producer contracts, subject only to later judicial review of the contract expiration dispute. At a minimum, the Commission should investigate the types of serious allegations presented here by the complainant and render a decision based on the substantive merits. As a practical matter, in the absence of such investigation, many small producers effectively will have no remedy of any kind in the event of such alleged pipeline conduct, because a contract lawsuit will be financially burdensome, if not impossible. Consequently, I urge the Commission to reconsider this policy.

El Paso Natural Gas is presently a subsidiary of Energy Transfer Partners.

=== Transwestern Pipeline Company v. Corinne Grace ===
Also in 1990 was the case where Grace was the defendant and Transwestern Pipeline, which was at that time was a subsidiary of Enron, was the plaintiff. The hearing resulted in FERC recognizing a state's interpretation of federal rules and regulations in terms of specific type of geology. In this case, the state was New Mexico. FERC made the following statement about the issue in support of wells which produce little natural gas (stripper wells):

New Mexico has approved recompletions such as Grace's as enhanced recovery techniques under section 108, but it has not approved applications for a new onshore reservoir determination under section 102 for any well in the pool, even if the well appears not to be in communication with any other well in the pool, because the pool produced before April 20, 1977. This result is also consistent with the pricing scheme established in the NGPA because the section 102 ceiling price, which applies to gas from new onshore reservoirs which did not produce before April 20, 1977, was intended to reward producers for incurring the risks involved in exploring for new sources of gas. Since producers who drill in the pool know that if they drill to a certain depth that they will encounter the Morrow Formation, with the possibility of multiple pay zones, they do not bear as great a risk as other producers.

In Grace v. City of Carlsbad, 126 N.M. 95 (N.M. Ct. App. 1998), the City of Carlsbad, New Mexico had leased property to Grace for the production of oil and gas. Grace had unfortunately overpaid the city and the statute of limitations for recovering from the mistake had expired. The unique application of equitable recoupment from tax law was presented in the court case as way to recoup the overpayment as the city was to receive future oil gas revenue.
