= Transwestern Pipeline Company v. Corinne Grace =

FERC hearing

Transwestern Pipeline Company v. Corinne Grace was a hearing before the Federal Energy Regulatory Commission (FERC) on May 25, 1990. Transwestern Pipeline (a subsidiary of Enron at that time) claimed that Grace, an independent oil and gas operator, had a well that was misclassified by the New Mexico Oil Conservation Division (NM OCD) as what is called a stripper well under §108 (Ceiling Price for Stripper Well Natural Gas) of the Natural Gas Policy Act of 1978 (NGPA). A stripper well is a well that is marginally productive. The underlying issue was the geology of the Morrow Formation in New Mexico and the reliability of the information the oil and gas commission of one state had based its decision on based on this type of geological formation and its characteristics. Around this same time, Corinne Grace was also in the 1990 FERC hearing for Corinne B. Grace v. El Paso Natural Gas Company.

The hearing had a significant effect on U.S. oil and gas supply because of the number of stripper wells and their ability to supply natural gas for the U.S. economy. In recent history, stripper well production makes up about 8.2% of United States natural gas production, and the stripper well classification is the classification of a large majority of the number of U.S. onshore wells.

== Background ==
The NGPA defined a stripper well as essentially a well that produces less than 60 Mcf (60,000 cubic feet) per day during any 90-day interval. However, there was an exclusion or exemption for wells that had the application of what is defined as enhanced recovery in the NPGA.

=== Enhanced recovery legislation ===
The following defined enhanced recovery as legislated by the NGPA:

Nonassociated natural gas (gas from different geological zones) which is produced from a stripper well that actually exceeds 60 Mcf during any 90-day production period may continue to qualify as stripper well natural gas if the increase in this well production was the result of the application of recognized enhanced recovery techniques.

This encouraged oil and gas operators to try to increase production from marginally productive wells by producing from new zones in the well. This in turn helped with U.S. natural gas supply.

== NGPA Pricing Mechanism ==
Section 108 of the NGPA gave a price ceiling for stripper well natural gas. In May 1978, it was $2.09. Section 102 of the NGPA provides a financial incentive for oil and gas operators who develop new gas production from new zones. FERC describes the application of these two sections in its concluding remarks:

New Mexico has approved recompletions such as Grace's as enhanced recovery techniques under section 108 but it has not approved applications for a new onshore reservoir determination under section 102 for any well in the pool, even if the well appears not to be in communication with any other well in the pool, because the pool produced before April 20, 1977. This result is also consistent with the pricing scheme established in the NGPA because the section 102 ceiling price, which applies to gas from new onshore reservoirs which did not produce before April 20, 1977, was intended to reward producers for incurring the risks involved in exploring for new sources of gas. Since producers who drill in the pool know that if they drill to a certain depth that they will encounter the Morrow Formation, with the possibility of multiple pay zones, they do not bear as great a risk as other producers.

== Conclusion ==
The Federal Energy Regulatory Commission agree that the State of New Mexico Oil and Gas Commission was correct in its application of allowing NGPA Section 108 pricing to take place as well as to deny Section 102 pricing. Grace was declared correct and Transwestern's requests were denied.
