= Public Service Corporation (disambiguation) =

Public Service Corporation was an energy and transportation company in the U.S. state of New Jersey.

Public Service Corporation (capitalized) may also refer to one of the following American companies:

- Central West Public Service Corporation, a defunct Chicago-based utility company
- Public Service Corporation of New Jersey, a defunct street railway and bus company owned by Public Service Corporation in New Jersey
- Wisconsin Public Service Corporation, a utility company headquartered in Green Bay, Wisconsin

Public service corporation (not capitalized) may refer to a public service company, a corporation or other non-governmental business entity that delivers public services.

== See also ==
- Public service (disambiguation)
- Public Service Company (disambiguation)
