= Recoupment =

For recoupment in terms of U.S. tax law, see equitable recoupment.

Recoupment, in the music industry, is a financial agreement between an artist and a record label, where the latter pays for expenses such as recording and marketing, which later deducts from the artist's royalties until recovering the expenses. The recoupment rate is typically between 15 and 20 percent of sales revenue. The practice is common, and most new artists have little choice but to accept it, since they lack the negotiating power to obtain a better contract.

== Examples ==
Suppose that a music label gives a band a $250,000 advance to record an album. The label agrees to do so in return for 90% of the sales. In addition, the label will specify certain standards for production of the album, for example, which studios the band will engage. The label may even hold the advance and make all disbursements on the band's behalf, ensuring the funds are used exactly as agreed. In other words, the $250,000 advance is not simply pocketed by the band -- it is to be spent on album production and the band's reasonable expenses during production. The album is recorded, and sells 301,000* copies at $10 each, yielding $3.01m. The record company takes 90% of this as agreed, leaving the band with $301,000 of their own. This is the situation without recoupment.

With recoupment, the label advances the band $250,000 as before. As before, the band (or the label, on the band's behalf) spends substantially all of the advance to produce an album meeting the label's specifications. The album again sells 301,000 copies at $10 each, yielding $3.01m. The record company recoups $250,000 off the artistes' royalties from sales (artistes royalties are $301,000), and then the label takes 90% of all further sales, as agreed. The band's net is effectively $51,000 while the label's net is $2,709,000.

*Recoupment deals primarily involve new artists, or those without a proven sales history, so selling 301,000 copies would be fairly unusual. More typically, 10,000 or fewer copies are sold by a new artist. In this more typical case, the label recoups only $100,000 of the $250,000 advance, along with other non-recoupable expenses incurred in getting the album out into the world – leaving the artists with $0 royalties.
