= Public service (disambiguation) =

Public service is a service provided (directly or indirectly) by a government to its citizens.

Public service may also refer to:

== General concepts ==
- The services provided by a public utility
- Public Service, the system of governmental departments, agencies and employees in the public sector; also called Civil service
  - Australian Public Service, the federal civil service of the Commonwealth of Australia
  - Public Service of Canada, the civilian workforce of the Government of Canada
- Public service announcement, a message in the public interest disseminated by the media
- Public service broadcasting, electronic media outlets whose primary mission is public service
  - Public Broadcasting Service (PBS), an American public broadcaster
- Public service company, a corporation or other non-governmental business entity that delivers public services
- Public service obligation, obligation imposed on an organisation in the context of European Union law

== Specific companies ==
- Public Service Company (disambiguation), several American companies
- Public Service Corporation (disambiguation), several American companies
- Public Service Enterprise Group, a diversified energy group internally calling itself "Public Service"

== Other uses ==
- Public Service (EP), a 1981 compilation album by several punk rock bands
- Public Service (TV series), a proposed title for the Parks and Recreation television series

== See also ==
- Community service
- Customer service
