= FERC Order 490 =

Federal Energy Regulatory Commission Seal

FERC Order 490 was a final rule by the Federal Energy Regulatory Commission to amend its regulations concerning the abandonment of certain sales and purchases of natural gas under Section 7(b) the Natural Gas Act (NGA) where the underlying contract has expired. It was enacted on April 12, 1988. The following year, an environment of more deregulation took place with the enactment of Natural Gas Wellhead Decontrol Act of 1989.

== Rationale for the rule ==
The goal of the order was to allow more affordable natural gas for the consumer. Gas from a producer going to a national pipeline would have the ability to switch to a regional pipeline. Contracts with high prices could be abandoned, which would lower prices for the consumer as a result.

Prior to the rule, gas that was dedicated to an interstate pipeline or similar customer could not sell the gas to anyone else until FERC found that "abandonment is required by the public convenience and necessity" under Section 7(b) of the NGA. The logic was the right to abandon contracts on interstate pipelines could allow gas to regional pipelines, if needed.

== Criticism ==
In Corinne B. Grace v. El Paso Natural Gas Company, FERC made the following statement:

Order No. 490 was never intended to be an unconstrained grant of regulatory authority to interstate pipelines to terminate and abandon small producer contracts, subject only to later judicial review of the contract expiration dispute. At a minimum, the Commission should investigate the types of serious allegations presented here by the complainant and render a decision based on the substantive merits. As a practical matter, in the absence of such investigation, many small producers effectively will have no remedy of any kind in the event of such alleged pipeline conduct, because a contract lawsuit will be financially burdensome, if not impossible. Consequently, I urge the Commission to reconsider this policy.

== Applications ==
On direct application of the rule took place in Transwestern Pipeline Company v. FERC, which involved a petition for review of FERC Order 490 to permit Williams Natural Gas Company to unconditionally abandon its certified obligation to purchase gas from Transwestern. Williams had given Transwestern one year's notice of its intent to abandon service. Eleven days after the agreement, FERC had issued Order Number 490.
