= David Booth Kansas Memorial Stadium =

University of Kansas football stadium in Lawrence Kansas

- The Booth
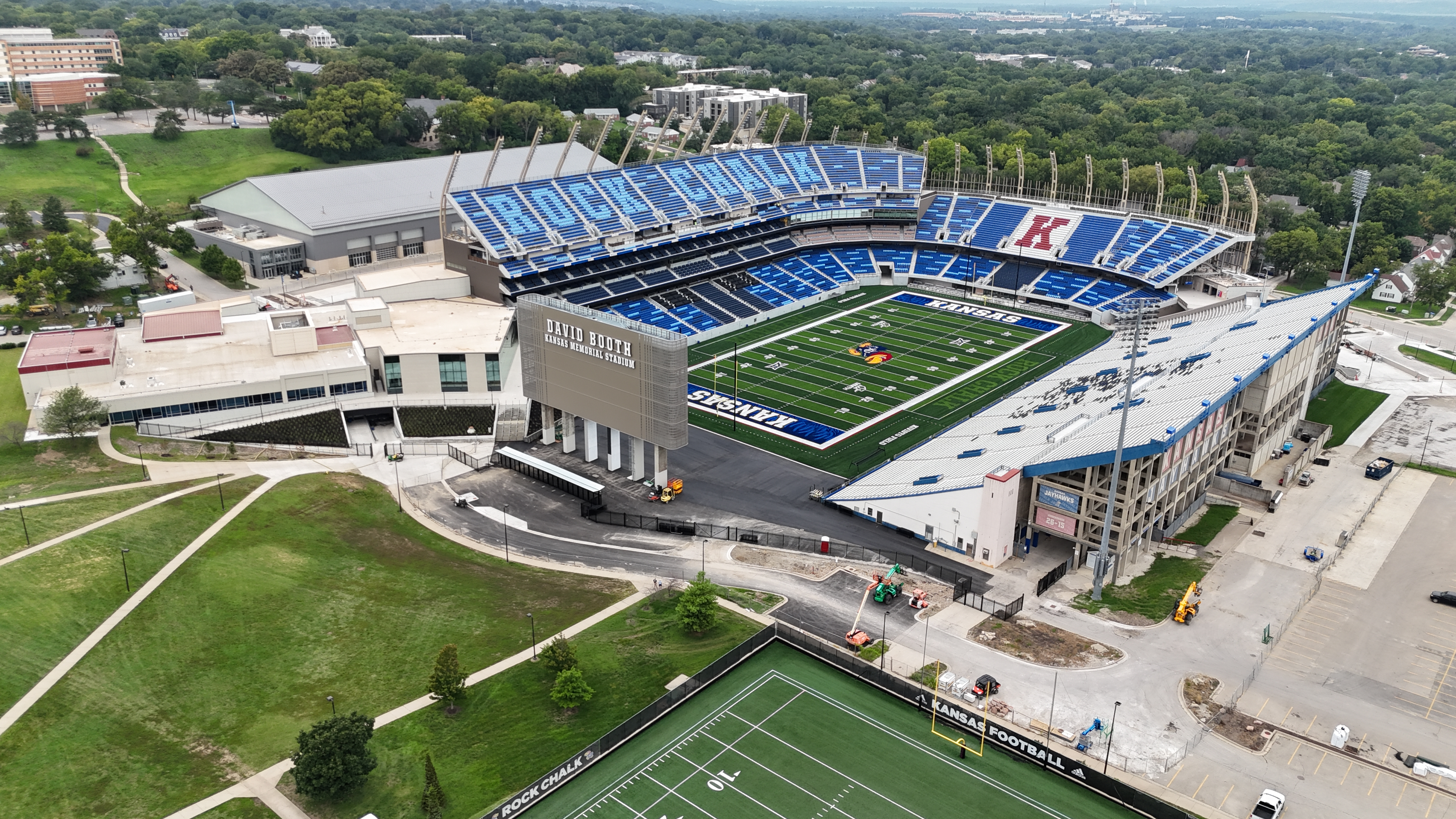
- The stadium in August 2025

- Location in Kansas Location in the United States
- Former names: Memorial Stadium (1921–2017)
- Location: 1101 Mississippi Street; Lawrence, Kansas
- Coordinates: 38°57′48″N 95°14′47″W
- Owner: University of Kansas
- Operator: University of Kansas
- Capacity: 41,525 (2025); 32,000 (2026); 43,000 (2027–)
- Surface: Shaw Sports Turf
- Record attendance: 52,530

Construction
- Groundbreaking: May 10, 1921
- Opened: October 29, 1921
- Renovated: 1998, 2006, 2014, 2017, 2023—present
- Expanded: 1927, 1963, 1965
- Cost: $275,000 ($4.96 million in 2025 dollars)
- Architects: LaForce Bailey and Clement C. Williams; Treanor Architects (renovations)

Tenants
- Kansas Jayhawks football (1921–2023, 2025-present); Kansas Jayhawks track and field (1922–2013)

David Booth Kansas Memorial Stadium is a college football stadium in Lawrence, Kansas, on the campus of the University of Kansas. The original stadium was opened in 1921, and is the seventh oldest college football stadium in the country, and is widely recognized as the oldest west of the Mississippi River. It is the home stadium of the Kansas Jayhawks football team.

Nicknamed "The Booth", the stadium is dedicated as a memorial to Kansas students who died in World War I, and is one of six major veterans' memorials on the campus. The stadium is at the center of all seven war memorials—adjacent to the stadium.

In 2023, KU athletics announced a near-total rebuild of the facility, including the tear-down and reconstruction of the grandstands, and new athletics facilities. Phase one, rebuilding the western side, was completed in 2025; phase two is currently under construction and will be at full capacity for the 2027 season.

On December 20, 2017, KU Chancellor Douglas Girod announced that the stadium would be renamed in honor of KU alumnus and donor David G. Booth, who pledged a donation of $50 million to overhaul the facility.

== Construction and renovation ==
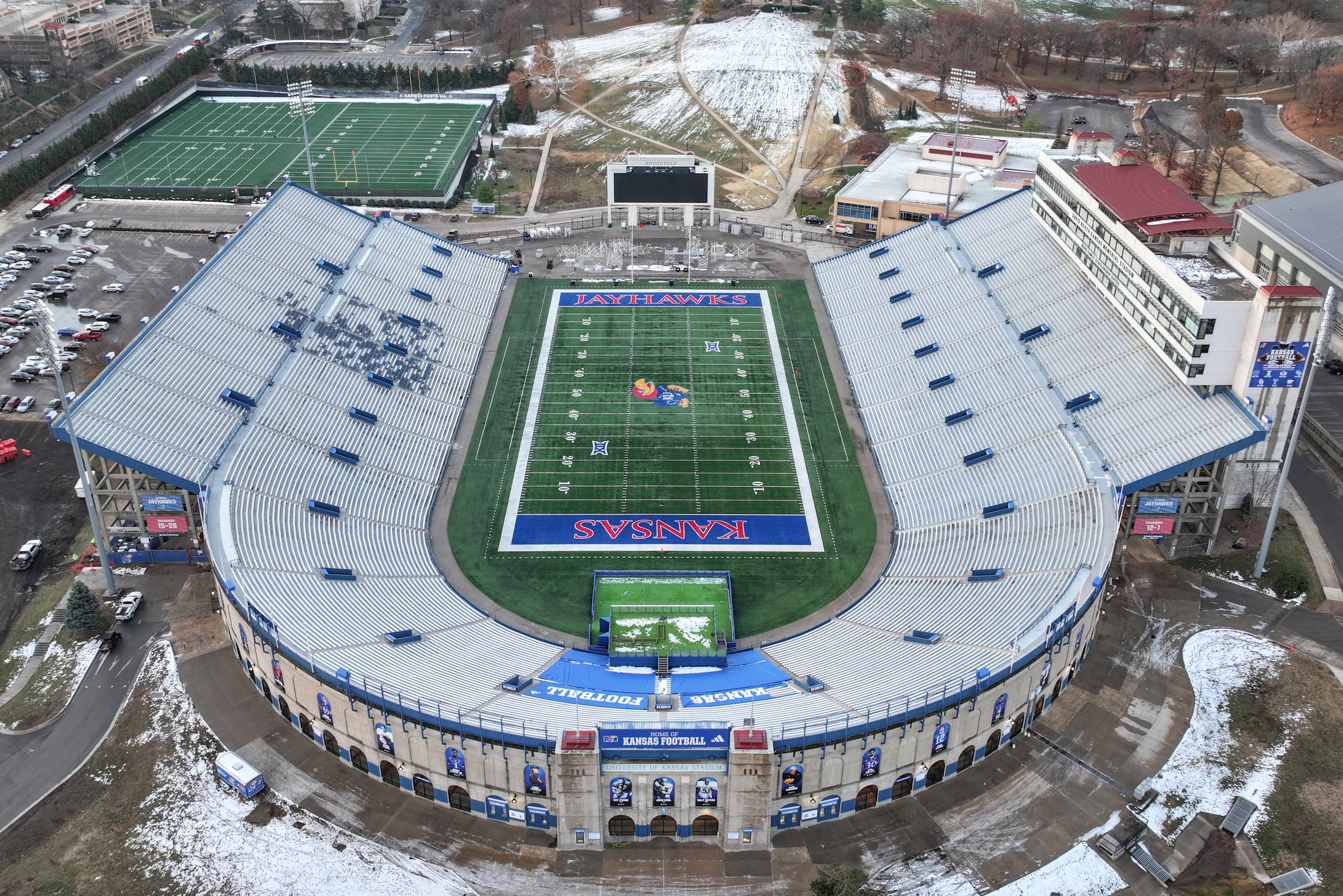
The stadium a week before demolition, December 2023

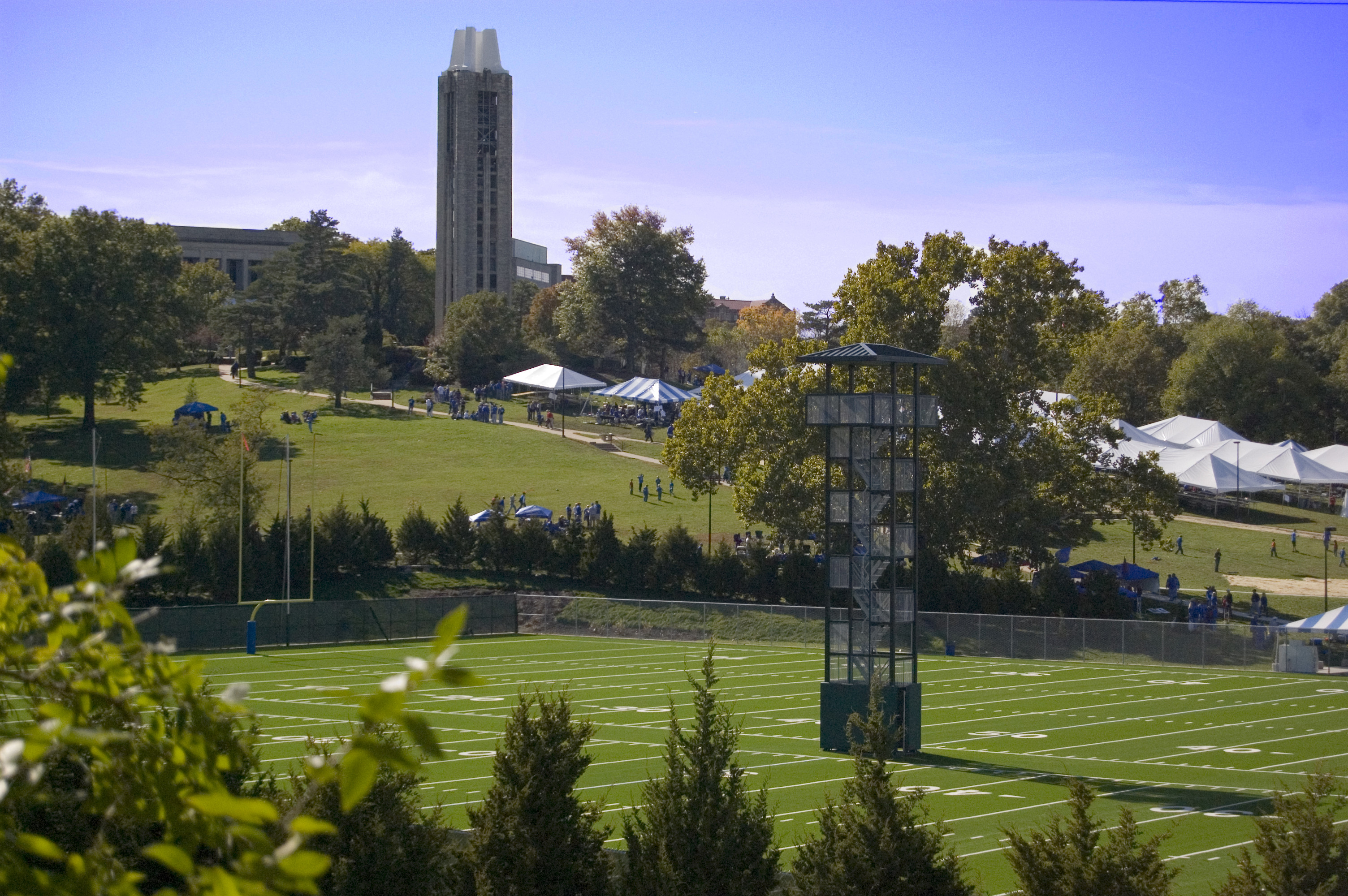
Kansas Football's new practice fields and tailgaters on the hill below the Campanile

Memorial Stadium was built in 1920 funded by students, faculty, and fans. Originally the stadium had only east and west bleachers, which were expanded southward in 1925. The north bowl seating section was added in 1927 to give the stadium its horseshoe shape which it retains today. The west bleachers were expanded significantly upwards in 1963, with similar additions to the east side in 1965. A major renovation in 1978 repaired concrete and upgraded home and visiting team facilities.

Permanent lights were installed in 1997 and the current infrastructure is the result of a 1998 renovation. The press box and scholarship suites saw significant improvement and expansion in 1999, and the MegaVision video board was installed in the same year.

The field has been artificial turf since 1970. In the summer of 2025, MMTH Sports Construction installed a Shaw Sports Turf GAME ON field, featuring a custom wheatfield design in the endzones. The iconic imagery symbolizes the KU student section tradition of "waving the wheat" during game days.

A new scoreboard with two video strips was mounted at the top of the stadium's north bowl for the 2005 season, correcting a quirk of the stadium that north-driving teams had no way to see the clock without turning around. In 2006, the playing field was named Kivisto Field in honor of prominent donor Tom Kivisto.

The University of Kansas broke ground on the new $31-million Anderson Family Football Complex on October 6, 2006, and it opened in 2008. The building includes offices, academic areas, a weight room, locker rooms, an audio-visual room, meeting rooms, a cardio room, a hydro-therapy room, a nutrition area and a display area. It is also joined by new practice fields to the southeast of the stadium.

On September 17, 2009, the Kansas Board of Regents approved a $34 million addition of luxury seating on the east side of the stadium. The addition, known as the Gridiron Club, would have increased the stadium's capacity by 3,000 seats. However, the project was canceled due to lack of funds.

In the summer of 2014 the track around the football field was removed and artificial turf was laid in its place.

The stadium was renovated in August 2017 with new seats, a new touchdown club behind the north end zone, and the outside walls with banners. The rim of the northern bowl also had a series of 5 flagpoles installed on both sides of the scoreboard, with one side set to feature American flags, and one side set to feature the state flag of Kansas.

On August 15, 2023, University of Kansas athletics unveiled plans for a complete rebuild of the stadium that would begin immediately following the 2023 season. This renovation will improve restrooms and concessions, implementing a seating bowl design, improvements to the concourses, and club and loge seats. The construction began following the conclusion of the Jayhawks 2023 Season. For the construction, the stadium will undergo a near-total demolition with minimal original structures in the stadium remaining. Due to the extensive construction, Kansas did not play at the stadium for its 2024 season, playing two non-conference games at Sporting Park in Kansas City, Kansas and four conference games at Arrowhead Stadium, home of the Kansas City Chiefs.

The renovation was planned in two phases. The first, set to be completed in time for the 2025 season, involves the demolition of the west stands and their replacement by new stands, plus a new conference center at the stadium's north end that can host events of up to 1,000 attendees. The second phase is the reconstruction of the east stands, combined with a mixed-use facility that will include a hotel, restaurants, and retail. KU initially placed the second phase on hold, acknowledging a lack of funds to proceed with that phase. However, according to a September 2024 report by the Lawrence Journal-World, developers told KU that no other construction on the stadium's east side was possible until stadium construction on that side was completed. The east side renovations would move the stands 80 to 100 feet west, allowing space for the project's other features. Another complication for the second phase involves parking—the east side houses the stadium's two largest parking lots. Plans call for the construction of a parking garage in that area. KU officials were also considering adding student housing to the complex.

During renovations, the capacity was reduced to 32,000 for the 2026 season. Upon project completion in 2027, the capacity will be 43,000.

== Capacity ==
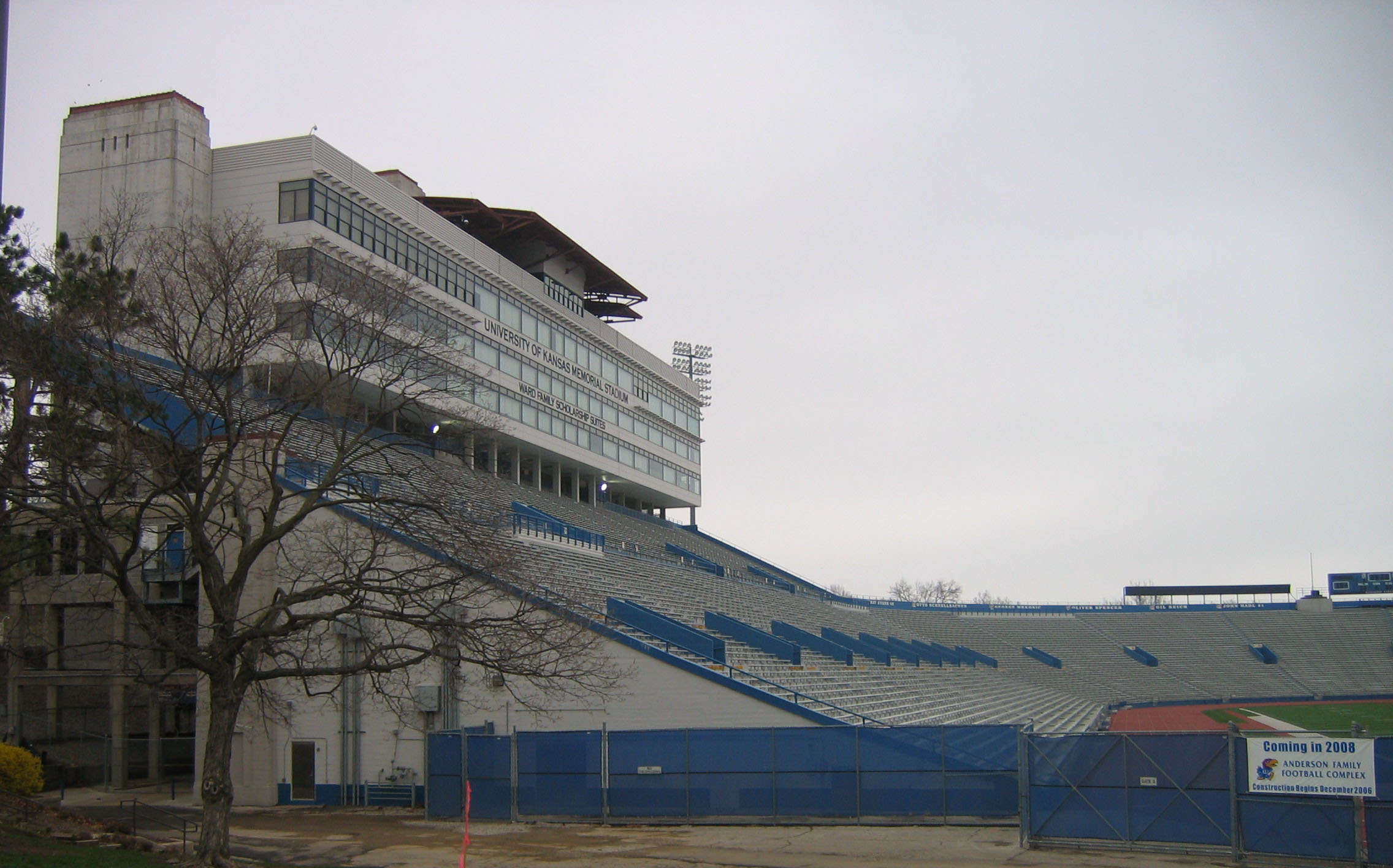
The main stand, 2007

Before the 2024 renovations, the stadium's official capacity was 47,233. A then-record crowd of 51,574 saw the Jayhawks defeat Kansas State 25–18 in 1973.

At the Jayhawks' November 5, 2005 streak-snapping 40–15 victory over Nebraska, it was announced that that attendance record was broken, with a standing-room-only crowd of 51,750.

On November 18, 2006, a then attendance record of 51,821 fans watched the Jayhawks defeat Kansas State, 39–20. The home attendance average of 44,137 in seven games during the year set a new season record, surpassing the prior season's record of 43,675 in six contests. Over the last three seasons, stadium attendance has averaged more than 41,000 per game.

On November 1, 2008, the Jayhawks set a new record of 52,230 fans in attendance. The Jayhawks beat Kansas State 52–21 in the Sunflower Showdown. As of 2026, it remains Kansas' last win in the series.

On September 5, 2009, Kansas broke the record again as 52,530 fans watched the Jayhawks defeat Northern Colorado in the opening game of the Jayhawks' 2009 season.

== Tenants ==
=== Kansas Jayhawks football ===
- In 2005, the Jayhawks went undefeated at Memorial Stadium for the first time since 1951. The team allowed just two touchdowns in first quarters at home during the season.
- In 2007, the Jayhawks went undefeated at home again, highlighted by a 76–39 victory over Nebraska. The 76 points by the Jayhawks was the third most scored in Kansas history, and also the most points given up in Nebraska history.

=== The Kansas Relays ===
Memorial Stadium also hosted the Kansas Relays track and field event every year from 1923 through 2013, except in 1943, 1944 and 1945 due to World War II and 1998 and 1999 due to construction. The Relays annually see top area high school and intercollegiate competitors, and the open events often draw Olympic runners such as Maurice Greene and Marion Jones. The Kansas Relays is the location where world-record holder Justin Gatlin tested positive for performance-enhancing drugs in 2006. Gatlin served a four-year suspension, but has since returned to track prominence.

In 2014, the Kansas Relays left Memorial Stadium and moved to Rock Chalk Park, a new multi-sport complex located northwest of the KU campus. The new track facility seats 7,000 and features a nine-lane, World Athletics-certified track.

=== High school football ===
The stadium has hosted numerous Kansas State High School Activities Association state championship games and Kansas Shrine Bowl all-star games. Local area high schools Lawrence High and Free State High have in the past played their annual rivalry game in the stadium, but as of 2018 have played traditional home-away games at their respective high schools.

== Popular culture ==
- Prominently featured in the 1983 television movie, The Day After.

== Top crowds ==
The following are the top 10 largest crowds in stadium history. Due to the capacity having been reduced since these games, these records will likely remain barring an expansion of the stadium.

Number	Date	Kansas Rank	Opponent	Attendance
1	September 5, 2009	No. 25	Northern Colorado	52,530
2	November 1, 2008	NR	Kansas State	52,230
3	August 30, 2008	No. 14	Florida International	52,112
4	November 15, 2008	NR	No. 5 Texas	51,930
5	November 3, 2007	No. 8	Nebraska	51,910
6	November 18, 2006	NR	Kansas State	51,821
7	September 20, 2008	No. 19	Sam Houston State	51,767
8	November 5, 2005	NR	Nebraska	51,750
9	October 13, 1973	No. 19	Kansas State	51,574
10	November 14, 2009	NR	Nebraska	51,525

=== Full capacity attendance ===
Since capacity was reduced on their stadium, the Jayhawks have had attendance at full capacity 12 times.

Date	Kansas Rank	Opponent
November 2, 2019	NR	No. 22 Kansas State
September 24, 2022	NR	Duke
October 1, 2022	NR	Iowa State
October 8, 2022	No. 19	No. 17 TCU
September 23, 2023	NR	BYU
October 28, 2023	NR	No. 6 Oklahoma
November 11, 2023	No. 16	Texas Tech
November 18, 2023	No. 25	No. 21 Kansas State
August 23, 2025	NR	Fresno State
October 25, 2025	NR	Kansas State
September 11, 2026	NR	No. 23 Missouri
October 3, 2026	NR	Middle Tennessee

== See also ==
- List of NCAA Division I FBS football stadiums
