= Stingray Pipeline =

Stingray Pipeline is a natural gas pipeline that brings natural gas from the offshore Gulf of Mexico to Louisiana. It is owned by Energy Transfer. Its FERC code is 69.
