= Joe T. Haney =

United States military musician (1927-2016)

- Born: August 19, 1927; Colorado City, Texas, United States
- Died: March 10, 2016 (aged 88)
- Relatives: Mary Logan (wife, married in 1953)
- Military career
- Branch: United States Army; Texas State Guard
- Service years: 1945–1989
- Rank: Colonel
- Nickname: "The Colonel"

Joe Tom Haney (August 19, 1927 – March 10, 2016) was a United States Army colonel was director of bands at Texas A&M University and the 12th director of the Fightin' Texas Aggie Band.

== Early life and education ==
Joe Tom Haney was born in Colorado City, Texas, on August 19, 1927, to Clyde, an employee with the El Paso Natural Gas Company and Vista Mae Haney, a piano teacher. His father died in an explosion in 1929, after which he and his mother moved to Marlin. He began playing trombone from the sixth grade. After graduation from Marlin High School in 1944, he enrolled in Texas A&M University, where was there for only one semester before being drafted.

== Military and high school bandmaster career ==
He served fourteen months in Korea and played in the 282nd AGF Band in Seoul before receiving an honorable discharge in 1947 and enrolling in Southern Methodist University, where he graduated in 1950. For his first position as a band director at Hemphill High School. In 1951, he became bandmaster of the Mexia High School Band

== Aggie band ==
In 1972 he was invited to become the associate director of the Texas Aggie Band. Haney organized the Texas A&M University Symphonic Band in 1973.

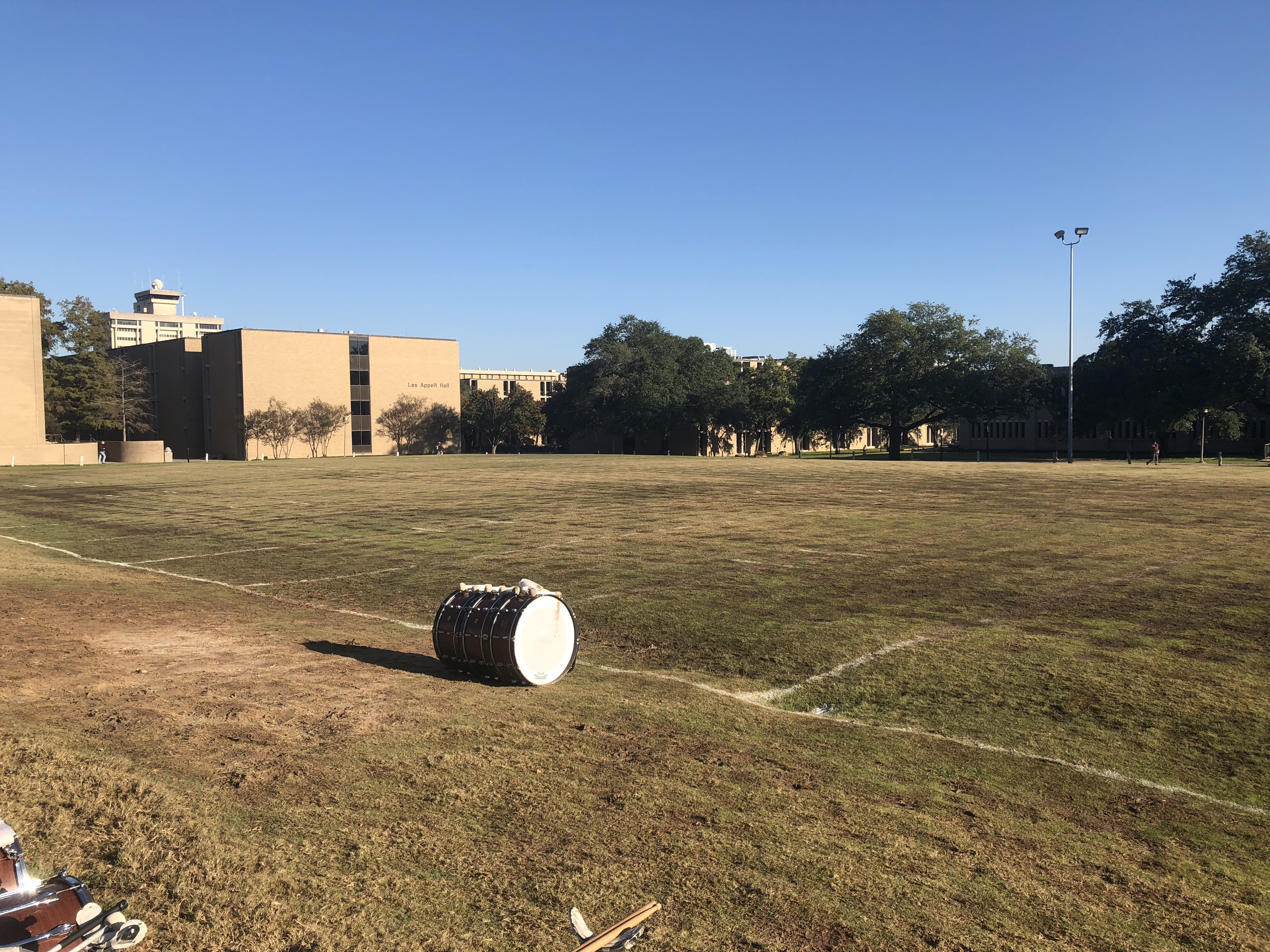
The Haney Drill Field (seen here) ceased to be used by the Aggie Band as of November 2018.

=== Noble Men of Kyle and other arrangements ===
He wrote the signature march of the band "Noble Men of Kyle" in 1972, and it is played numerous times during marchpasts.

His arrangement of "The Spirit of Aggieland" has been performed by the Aggie Band at all football games since 1968.

== Retirement, death and legacy ==
He retired in 1989 and was succeeded by Air force Lieutenant Colonel Ray E. Toler. Both Joe Haney and Ray Toler were natives of Marlin, Texas. Until Colonel Haney’s death he held the title of Director Emeritus of the Fighting Texas Aggie Band. Colonel Haney died in March 2016. The following September, he was honored in memoriam by the band with the playing of The Noble Men of Kyle at the first football game of the season with UCLA.

Haney Drill Field is named in his honor, with the name change taking place in 1992 at the request of a senior cadet.
