= Public Service Company =

Public Service Company (capitalized) may refer one of the below listed American companies.

When not capitalized, public service company often refers to the concept of companies that offer public services.

- Central West Public Service Company, in Missouri and surrounding areas
- Eastern Shore Public Service Company, in Delaware and Maryland
- Interstate Public Service Company, in Indiana
- Kansas City Public Service Company, in Missouri
- Northern Indiana Public Service Company
- Public Service Company of Colorado
- Public Service Company of Indiana
- Public Service Company of New Hampshire
- Public Service Company of New Mexico
- Public Service Company of Oklahoma
- St. Louis Public Service Company, in Missouri

== See also ==
- Public service (disambiguation)
- Public Service Corporation (disambiguation)
