= Corinne B. Grace v. El Paso Natural Gas Company =

Corinne B. Grace v. El Paso Natural Gas Company was the hearing for the legal proceedings before the Federal Energy Regulatory Commission (FERC) which consisted of a hearing and a later rehearing, between 1989 and 1990. The issue was based on FERC Order 490, which the commission had created for the issue of abandonment of certain natural gas sales and purchases under the authority of Natural Gas Act of 1938 (NGA). El Paso Natural Gas had cancelled the contract for natural gas producer Grace, which was contested by Grace as not authorized by FERC regulations. The result from the hearings was that FERC decided to consider the effects of the order in terms of the effect on natural gas producers. Around this same time, Corinne B. Grace was also in the 1990 FERC hearing for Transwestern Pipeline Company v. Corinne Grace.

== Background ==
Along with FERC Order 490, the legal environment at that time also had the newly enacted Natural Gas Wellhead Deregulation Act of 1989 which addressed the same issues of expired and terminated natural gas contracts, creating an environment where natural gas pipelines had greater flexibility in terms of abandoning natural gas contracts from producers. Prior to the 1989 act, a sale subject to federal jurisdiction under the Natural Gas Act of 1938 could not be abandoned unless FERC determines it to be in the public interest.

== Conclusion ==
Although El Paso Natural Gas Company was considered lawful in the cancelling the contract, the hearings resulted in the following conclusion on the abandonment of natural gas contracts by pipelines with independent oil and gas producers, within the setting of the new Natural Gas Wellhead Deregulation Act of 1989 having been passed by Congress and signed by President George H. W. Bush:

Order No. 490 was never intended to be an unconstrained grant of regulatory authority to interstate pipelines to terminate and abandon small producer contracts, subject only to later judicial review of the contract expiration dispute. At a minimum, the Commission should investigate the types of serious allegations presented here by the complainant and render a decision based on the substantive merits. As a practical matter, in the absence of such investigation, many small producers effectively will have no remedy of any kind in the event of such alleged pipeline conduct, because a contract lawsuit will be financially burdensome, if not impossible. Consequently, I urge the Commission to reconsider this policy.
