= Desert Southwest Pipeline =

American natural gas pipeline

- Industry: Petroleum
- Owner: Energy Transfer

The Desert Southwest Pipeline is an approximately 520-mile underground pipeline project by Energy Transfer that will expand the long-running Transwestern Pipeline. Desert Southwest will transport natural gas from the Permian Basin to Arizona and New Mexico to help meet the growing demand for electricity driven by population expansion and economic growth throughout the Southwestern United States.

The project was first announced by Energy Transfer on August 6, 2025. A few months later in December, Energy Transfer announced plans to upsize the mainline pipe diameter from 42 inches to 48 inches to meet the need for additional capacity identified through a recent open season. The change will expand the pipeline's maximum capacity from 1.5 billion cubic feet per day of natural gas to 2.3 billion cubic feet a day.

Most of the additional gas supplies will go to the Phoenix (city) area and central Arizona to power the fast-growing AI data center market and industrial users. Arizona Public Service Co. is the project's anchor customer. Energy Transfer estimates 5,000 workers will be employed during the construction of the 516-mile-long pipeline expansion project, and only American-made steel will be used. It is scheduled for completion in Q4 2029.
