= Lake Charles LNG =

Liquefied natural gas terminal in the United States

Coordinates: 30.1171°N 93.2887°W

Lake Charles LNG (former name: Trunkline LNG as import terminal) is a liquefied natural gas export terminal proposed in Lake Charles, Louisiana, United States. It is owned by the subsidiary of Energy Transfer. Together with Royal Dutch Shell there was a plan to build a 15 million tons per year liquefaction plant to the terminal to allow LNG export. The existing Lake Charles LNG import and regasification terminal has approximately 430,000 cubic meters of above ground LNG storage capacity, two deep water docks capable of handling ships with up to 217,000 cubic meters of capacity, and a deep-water turning basin.

As Trunkline LNG, The Phase I expansion included a second ship berth and a new LNG storage tank that increased terminal storage capacity to 9 billion cubic feet (250,000,000 m^{3}), and was placed in service on April 5, 2006. Trunkline LNG completed the Phase II terminal expansion in early July 2006, increasing sustained sendout capacity to 1.8 billion cubic feet per day (51,000,000 m^{3}/d) and peak sendout capacity to 2.1 billion cubic feet per day (59,000,000 m^{3}/d). The Phase II expansion also included the construction of unloading capabilities at the terminal's second dock.

According to Energy Transfer's website, the LNG project would have converted Energy Transfer's existing Lake Charles LNG import and regasification terminal into an LNG liquefaction and export facility utilizing existing infrastructure. The project was fully permitted by the Federal Energy Regulatory Commission for three 5.5 MPTA liquefaction trains, which will utilize existing infrastructure.

On December 18, 2025, Energy Transfer announced the decision to suspend development of Lake Charles LNG. “Energy Transfer management has determined that its continued development of the project is not warranted … but remains open to discussions with third parties who may have an interest in developing the project,” the company said.
