= Mariner East pipelines =

Mariner East pipeline system
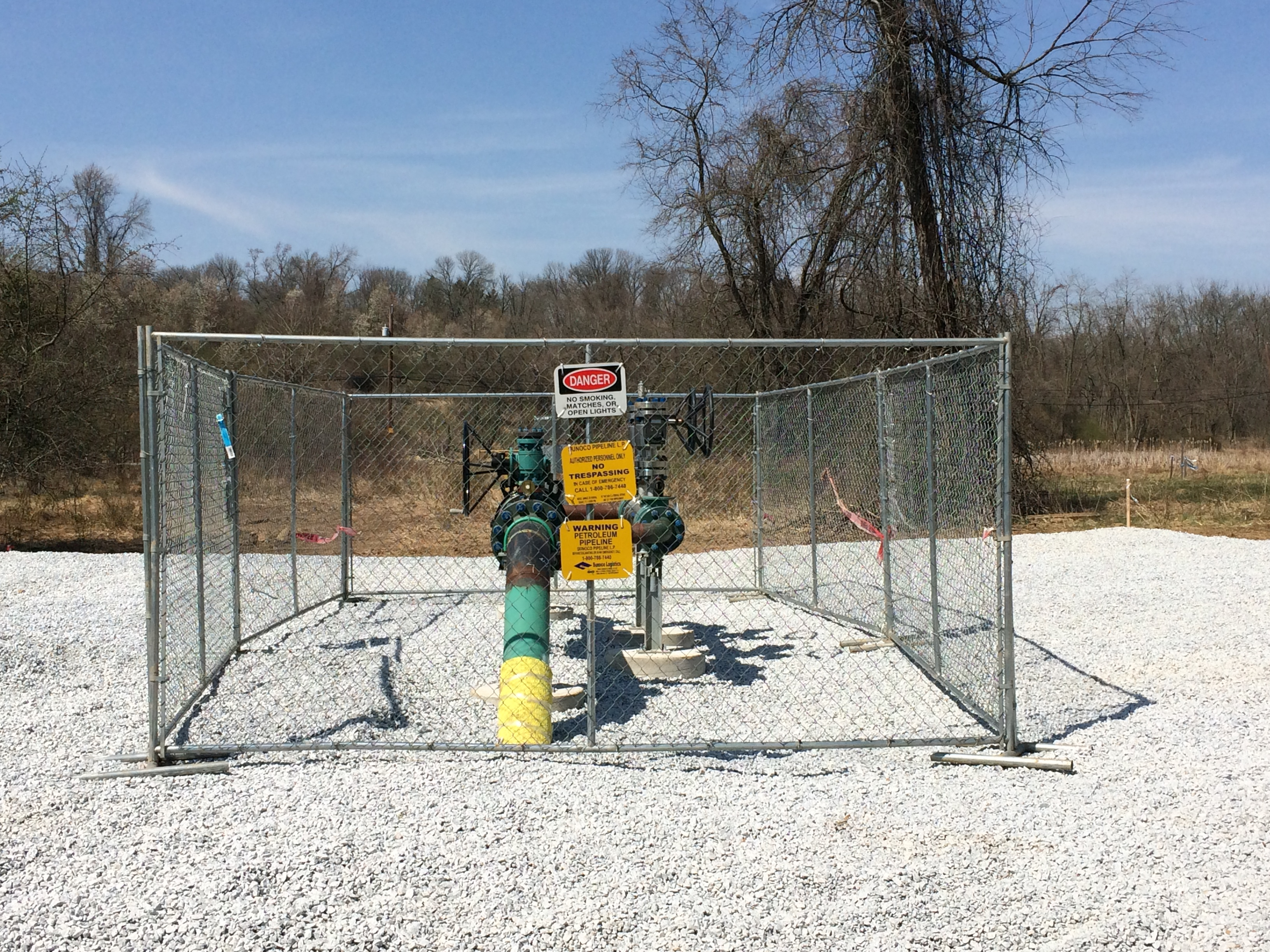
- Part of Mariner East II in Delaware County, Pennsylvania.

Location
- Country: Pennsylvania, United States
- Direction: East-West
- To: Marcus Hook, Pennsylvania

General information
- Owner: Sunoco Pipeline, Energy Transfer Partners
- Commissioned: 2015

Technical information
- Length: 350 mi (560 km)
- Diameter: 20 in (508 mm)

The Mariner East pipelines are a series of Natural Gas Liquids pipelines in the US state of Pennsylvania. The pipelines are intended to facilitate the transfer of Natural Gas Liquids from the Utica Shale and Marcellus Shale Formations to destinations in Pennsylvania, including Energy Transfer's Marcus Hook Terminal on the Delaware River, where ethane, butane, pentane, propane are processed, stored and distributed to local, domestic and waterborne markets. Some of the ethane is distributed to local and regional domestic markets, including Pennsylvania, New Jersey, Delaware, New York, Connecticut and Maryland. The Mariner East system connects along its route to a power plant in Cambria County for ethane feed, as well as several propane and butane distribution terminals.

The construction of the pipelines generated considerable controversy inside Pennsylvania. Construction on the pipelines, dubbed Mariner East 1, 2, and 2X, was undertaken by Sunoco Pipeline.

== Pipelines ==
=== Mariner East 1 ===
Mariner East 1 was originally built as a gasoline pipeline in the 1930s. The conversion of the gasoline pipeline into a NGL compatible pipeline was completed in 2015. In March 2018 portions of the pipeline were temporarily shut down by the State of Pennsylvania after the pipeline was suspected of causing sinkholes in West Whiteland Township.

=== Mariner East 2 ===
Mariner East 2 was a new pipeline in Pennsylvania that was intended to supplement Mariner East 1's ability to move natural gas liquids from Western Pennsylvania to a refinery in Marcus Hook, Delaware County. Combined with Mariner East 1, the 16-inch pipeline was intended to carry 345,000 barrels of natural gas liquids per day.

Project managers' original plan was to use horizontal directional drilling, a process noted for its relatively minimal impact on surface topsoil. Outright construction began in February 2017 at a projected cost of $2.5 billion. A number of delays extended the construction timetable by 18 months: issues with permitting, extensive litigation with landowners on whose land the pipeline traversed, opposition from environmental groups, and instances of accidental pollution. Construction was halted between the beginning of January and early February 2018 after horizontal drilling resulted in the pollution of well water. A $12.6 million dollar civil penalty was also issued to Sunoco Pipeline by the State of Pennsylvania.

Further problems ensued. The Pennsylvania Public Utility Commission halted construction in March 2018 after experimental horizontal directional drilling ruptured a fault line and created sinkholes in a suburban neighborhood. Machines being used to construct the pipeline were vandalized at a construction site in West Whiteland Township in early April 2018. Both Sunoco Pipeline and an environmentalist group blamed each other for the sabotage, and both offered a $10,000 reward for information about the vandalism.

The Pennsylvania Department of Environmental Protection twice halted completion of the project in less than a year and fined Sunoco Pipeline over $12.6 million for violations. In mid-April 2018 Sunoco Pipeline announced that it would consider switching from using horizontal direction drilling to more traditional bore hole drilling at construction sites in West Whiteland Township. This decision came in the wake of concerns about HDD drilling affecting local aquifers and wells. Local residents and legislators were vehemently opposed to the switch in drilling method as this would have the highly volatile gases 4 feet from surface through questionable and unstable geology in densely populated areas.

Initially planned to be completed in 2018, planned completion was pushed back to 2019 and then into 2020. In 2021 a Pennsylvania investigating grand jury handed down a 64-page indictment of Energy Transfer L.P. of Dallas TX, a successor to Sunoco Pipeline, listing 48 criminal violations of the Clean Streams Law.

As of February 2022, the project was complete.

=== Mariner East 2X ===
Mariner East 2X is a 20-inch pipeline envisioned to run parallel to the Mariner East 2 pipeline. The projected capacity of the 2X is 250,000 barrels of NGL per day. Initially planned to be completed in 2019, it wasn't until February 2022 that the pipeline was completed.
