= Ray Davis (businessman) =

American businessman (born 1941)

- Born: October 15, 1941 (age 85); Overton, Texas, U.S.
- Occupation: Businessman

Ray C. Davis (born October 15, 1941) is an American businessman. He served as the co-chief executive officer (CEO) and chairman for Energy Transfer Partners (ETP) and chairman of Energy Transfer Equity (ETE). He is co-owner and co-chairman of the Texas Rangers of Major League Baseball (MLB).

== Business career ==
Davis worked in the energy industry for forty years, until he retired as the CEO of ETP and ETE in 2007. He remained with the company as a director and operates Avatar Investments LP, a Dallas-based investment firm. In 2008, Davis made his first appearance on the Forbes 400 list, ranking 367th with a net worth of $1 billion. In 2012, he ranked 315th with a net worth of $1.5 billion, and he ranked 296th in 2013 with a net worth of $1.9 billion.

== Texas Rangers ownership ==
When the Rangers were put up for sale in 2010, Davis joined a group headed by Chuck Greenberg and Nolan Ryan, which purchased the club. Davis and Bob R. Simpson provided the majority of the $593 million sale price. Davis and Simpson became co-chairmen of the Rangers, but remained mostly behind the scenes as senior consultants while allowing Greenberg and Ryan to operate the team as CEO and president, respectively. This arrangement continued after Greenberg left in 2011 and ceded his post as CEO to Ryan. Following Ryan's resignation from the Rangers in 2013, MLB approved the Rangers' request to have Davis replace Ryan as the team's control person, thus making him the primary person accountable to the commissioner's office for the team's operations. However, Davis and Simpson have continued to stay in the background as senior consultants. For the most part, they left day-to-day operations in the hands of baseball operations heads Jon Daniels until 2022 (as general manager from 2013 to 2020 and as president of baseball operations from 2020 to 2022) and Chris Young since 2023 (as general manager).

On November 1, 2023, the Rangers defeated the Arizona Diamondbacks in five games to win the 2023 World Series, giving Davis his first championship.

== Personal life ==
Described as a "secretive old ghost", Davis avoids publicity. In 2010, he rebuffed an attempt by D Magazine to get a comment on his purchase of the Rangers, saying that he doesn't grant interviews. In a 2015 Dallas Morning News interview, he stated that it might be his last.

He is married to Linda, and together they have three children.
