= SemGroup =

SemGroup Corporation
- Industry: Petroleum industry
- Founded: 2000; 26 years ago
- Founder: Thomas L. Kivisto; Gregory C. Wallace
- Defunct: December 5, 2019; 6 years ago
- Fate: Acquired by Energy Transfer LP
- Headquarters: Tulsa, Oklahoma
- Key people: Carlin G. Conner, President & CEO; Robert N. Fitzgerald, CFO
- Services: Pipeline transport Natural gas processing Asphalt
- Revenue: ▲$2.503 billion (2018)
- Net income: ▼ -$24 million (2018)
- Total assets: ▼$5.210 billion (2018)
- Total equity: ▲$1.840 billion (2018)
- Number of employees: 880 (2018)
- Subsidiaries: Subsidiaries: SemCAMS; SemGas; SemLogistics; SemMaterials; HFOTCO; SemStream; NGL Equity Ownership; Rose Rock Midstream; White Cliffs Pipeline

SemGroup Corporation was a publicly traded company engaged in natural gas, petroleum, and propane pipeline transport. It was organized in Delaware and headquartered in Tulsa, Oklahoma. In December 2019, the company was acquired by Energy Transfer LP.

SemGroup LP was engaged in diversified services for the North American crude oil and refined products industry. Operations included gathering, transporting, marketing and hedging services. SemGroup owned and operated carrier pipelines, oil terminals, oil transport and service trucks, pipeline injection stations and terminal storage in Oklahoma, Louisiana, Kansas, and Texas. Canadian operations were located in Alberta, British Columbia, and Saskatchewan.

SemCAMS Midstream ULC was a business unit of SemGroup based in Calgary, Alberta. SemCAMS operated four gas processing plants in the Western Canadian Sedimentary Basin. SemCAMS offers midstream service options for wet or dry, sweet or sour gas gathering and processing, as well as dehydration, field compression and sulfur forming and handling.

Houston Fuel Oil Terminal Company was acquired by SemGroup in July 2017. Often referred to as 'HFOTCO,' the business unit operated one of the largest oil terminals in the U.S. HFOTCO is in the Houston Ship Channel on the U.S. Gulf Coast.

Rose Rock Midstream was a master limited partnership formed by SemGroup in 2011. It was originally publicly traded but fully acquired by SemGroup in September 2016.

== History ==
SemGroup LP was founded in 2000.

In July 2007, the company established a publicly traded affiliate, SemGroup Energy Partners LP.

In 2007, it was the 18th largest private company in the US.

=== Bankruptcy ===
Hedge funds run by Alerian Capital Management and Elliot Associates exercised the terms of a secured loan made to SemGroup and took over the general partnership interest in SemGroup Energy Partners LP. On July 22, 2008, Semgroup, LP filed for Chapter 11 bankruptcy protection in U.S. Bankruptcy Court in Wilmington, Delaware.

New York billionaire John Catsimatidis then became engaged in efforts to take over SemGroup and gained control over a majority of the company's management committee. He was opposed by the company's existing management, who argued for selling off at least some of the company's assets, while Catsimatidis stated his intention to keep the company together. On February 11, 2009 Catsimatidis was sued by a group of SemGroup executives, seeking removal of Catsimatidis and his allies from the committee. The company and its unsecured creditors committee sued former CEO Thomas L. Kivisto and former CFO Gregory C. Wallace, seeking return of $362 million that they claim the defendants used for their own transactions and benefits.

In April 2009, former FBI director Louis Freeh released a report on the circumstances surrounding the SemGroup bankruptcy, claiming it was a result of lies by its top executives about its liquidity problems and a mismanaged speculative oil trading strategy. In July 2009, Catsimatidis settled with the company, pursuant to which Catsimatidis acquired an interest in SemGroup's asphalt business and dropped his competing plan for the company's proposed reorganization.

=== Recovery ===
On December 1, 2009, SemGroup exited bankruptcy under a new corporate structure, eliminating its master limited partnership structure and becoming a publicly traded company focused on asphalt manufacture and marketing and on oil and natural gas storage and transport, with about 1,000 employees including 140 employees in Tulsa. SemGroup Energy Partners LP was renamed Blueknight Energy Partners LP.

SemGroup Corporation's common stock was listed on the New York Stock Exchange on November 11, 2010. Two of its representatives rang the opening bell of the New York Stock Exchange on December 17, 2010.

In November 2009, Vitol acquired the general partner of Blueknight. In October 2010, Vitol added Charlesbank Capital Partners as a second general partner; this led to public charges, by an investment fund associated with billionaire Michael Dell, that the transaction was improper self-dealing intended to take money from Blueknight's existing limited partners. Vitol denied these charges.

In October 2011, the company fought a hostile takeover offer from Plains All American Pipeline. The offer was withdrawn in April 2012.

In July 2017, the company acquired one of the largest oil terminals in the U.S. for over $2 billion.

In March 2018 the company sold its Mexican asphalt business to Ergon, Inc. for $72 million.

In April 2018, it sold a petroleum products storage facility in the U.K.

In December 2019, the company was acquired by Energy Transfer LP.

=== Leadership history ===
Thomas L. Kivisto co-founded SemGroup and served as its President and Chief Executive Officer. Another co-founder was Gregory C. Wallace, who served as CFO. In 2008, Terry Ronan replaced Kivisto as President and CEO. In September 2009, SemGroup announced a new leadership team, to be led by a new president and CEO, Norm Szydlowski, an experienced oil industry executive who had previously served as president and CEO of Colonial Pipeline Co. A new board was also announced, chaired by John F. Chlebowski, a director of NRG Energy, Inc. and previously president/CEO of GATX Terminals.

President and CEO Carlin G. Conner was named to the company's top role effective April 1, 2014. Thomas R. McDaniel became chairman of the SemGroup board of directors on January 1, 2017. McDaniel served as a director of SemGroup since 2009.
