= Rover pipeline =

Natural gas pipeline

The Rover pipeline is a 720-mile pipeline with a capacity to transport 3.4 Bcf/d of natural gas from processing plants in West Virginia, Eastern Ohio and Western Pennsylvania for delivery to other pipeline interconnects in Ohio and Michigan, where the gas is delivered for distribution to markets across the United States, as well as to Ontario, Canada. It is operated by Energy Transfer Partners.

Construction began in the first quarter of 2017 and was scheduled to end November 2017. The pipeline began carrying gas in September 2017.

In November 2017, the Ohio Attorney General filed suit against the owner and operator of the Rover pipeline (Rover Pipeline LLC) for multiple alleged failures, including illegal discharge of drilling fluids and failure to secure discharge permits. The Rover pipeline allegedly violated Ohio's water standards over a dozen times between April and September 2017. In December 2021, the Federal Energy Regulatory Commission announced it would seek $40 million in fines from Energy Transfer for environmental violations. Then in 2022, Energy Transfer sued in the U.S. District Court for the Northern District of Texas, arguing that its enforcement case is the purview of a federal judge — not FERC’s in-house courts.

In November of 2019, Energy Transfer began protesting the tax rate they should pay for the pipeline in Ohio.

In 2025, Rover Pipeline filed a complaint in Franklin County (Ohio), alleging that the Tax Commissioner’s 2019 assessment of Rover’s public utility property tax valuation violates both the Ohio and the United States Constitutions in a number of ways.
