= Public service company =

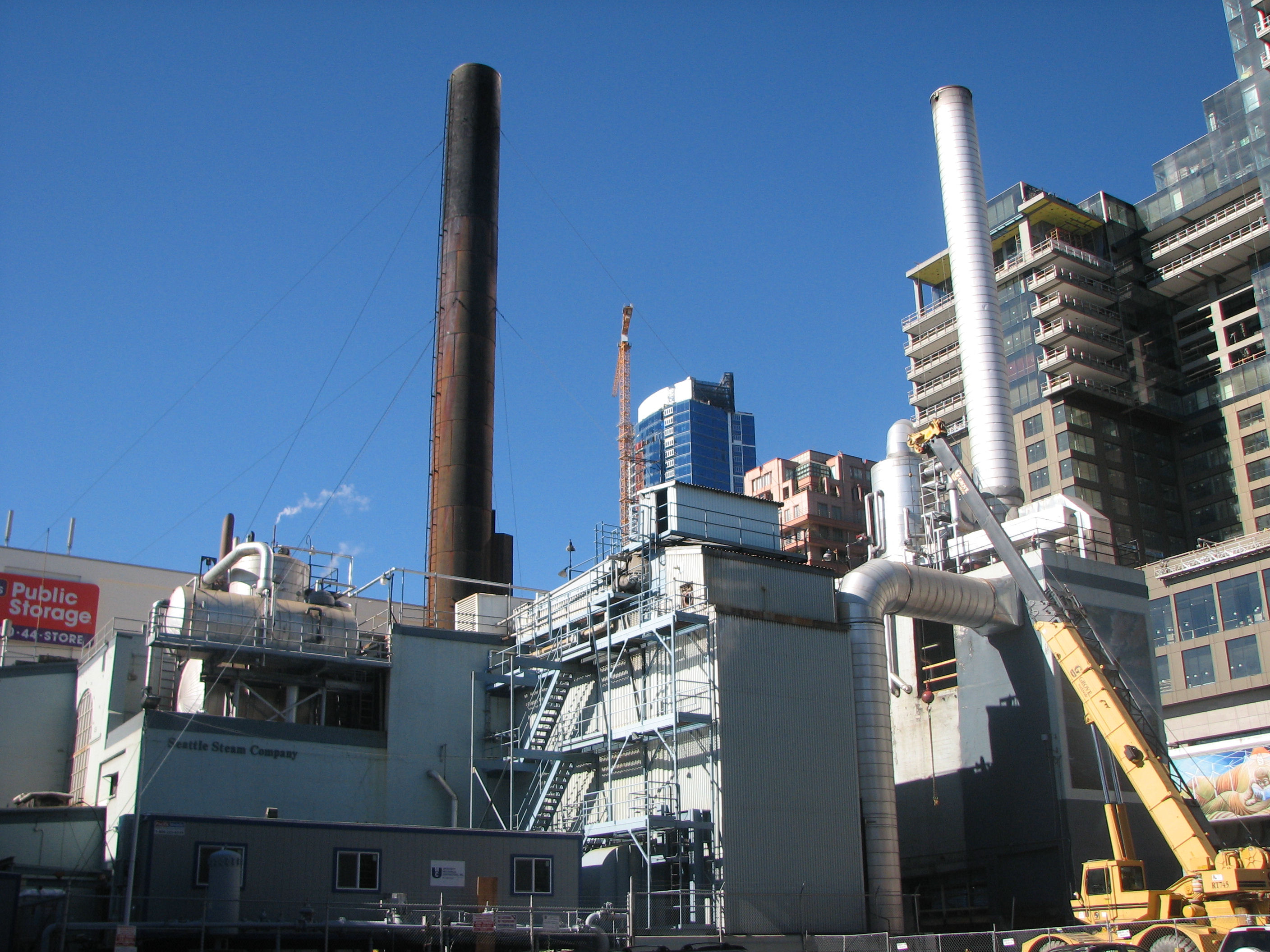
Main plant of the Seattle Steam Company in the U.S. state of Washington

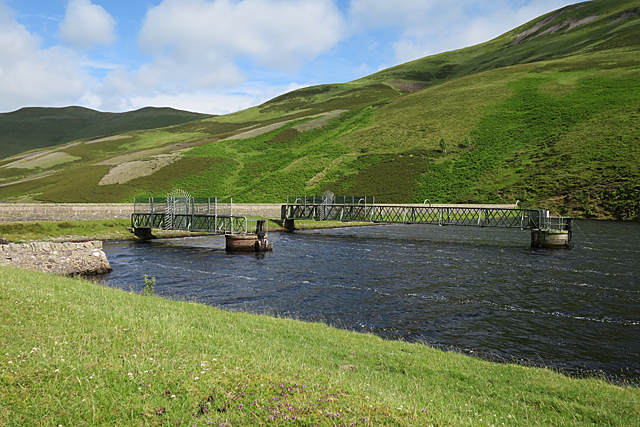
A reservoir used by the Edinburgh Water Company in Scotland

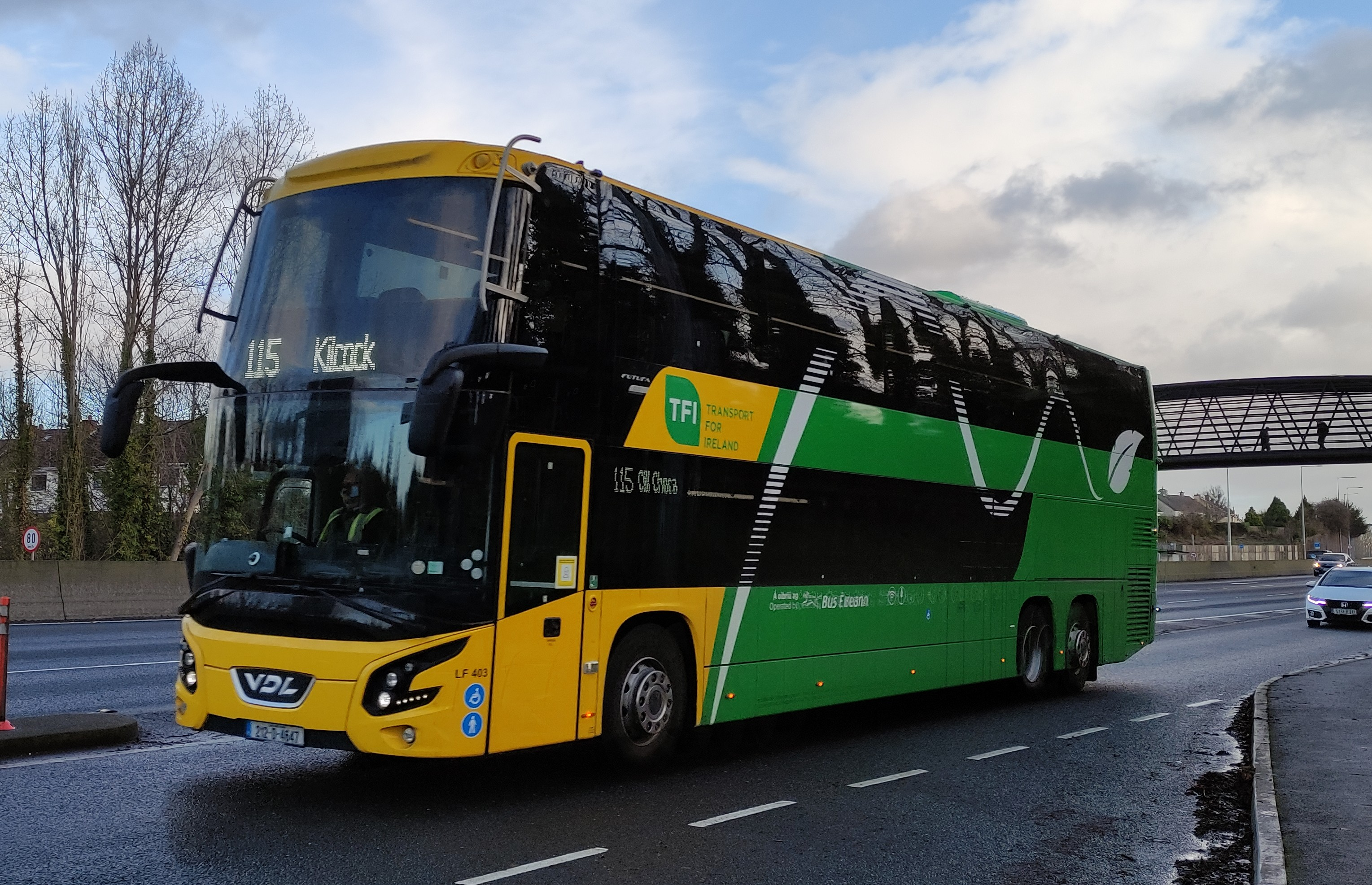
A Bus Éireann coach underway in Ireland

A public service company (or public utility company) is a corporation or other non-governmental business entity (i.e. limited partnership) that delivers public services—certain services considered essential to the public interest. The ranks of such companies include public utility companies like natural gas, pipeline, electricity, and water supply companies, sewer companies, telephone companies and telegraph companies. They also include public services such as transportation of passengers or property as a common carrier, such as airlines, railroads, trucking, bus, and taxicab companies.

Public service (or utility) companies may operate under certificates of public convenience and necessity which may limit competition. Their services may be subject to rate control and other regulations which are not common to general businesses.

The concept of public service companies was that, in order to attract sufficient private investment capital and guarantee sufficient revenues to ensure appropriate operations and services, protection from ruinous competition and additional governmental oversight of rates and services were required to balance the needs of the owners of the business with those of the general public.

Under concepts of deregulation, many principles under which public service companies have long operated are negated and replaced by those of a competitive market.

In the United States, at an interstate level, most airlines, railroad, and trucking and bus transportation services were deregulated in the last quarter of the 20th century. Many of the changes in the laws at the federal level had the effect of deregulation or substantially weakened similar state and local laws regarding the same services.

== See also ==
- Airline Deregulation Act (1977)
- Natural Gas Policy Act of 1978
- Staggers Rail Act (1980)
- Motor Carrier Act of 1980
- Bus Regulatory Reform Act (1982)
- Natural Gas Wellhead Decontrol Act of 1989
- Energy Policy Act of 1992
- Telecommunications Act of 1996
