= El Paso Natural Gas =

Corporation running system of natural gas pipelines

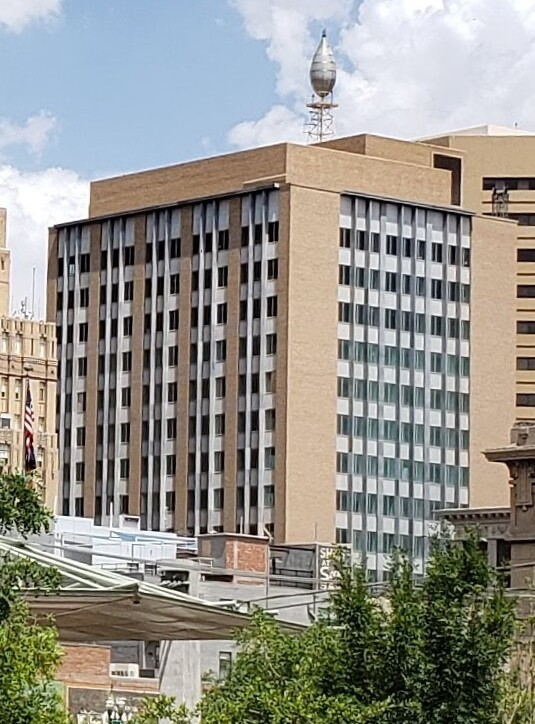
- The Blue Flame Building. The building was headquarters for El Paso Natural Gas from 1954 to 1996.
- Company type: Natural Gas Pipeline
- Industry: Pipeline
- Area served: Natural Gas Distribution: California, Arizona, Nevada, New Mexico, Oklahoma, Texas, and Northern Mexico.

El Paso Natural Gas (EPNG) is an American company and a 10,140-mile pipeline system consisting of a system of natural gas pipelines that brings gas from the Permian Basin in Texas and the San Juan Basin in New Mexico and Colorado to West Texas, New Mexico, Nevada, California, and Arizona. It also exports some natural gas to Mexico.

El Paso Natural Gas is based in Colorado Springs, Colorado and is owned by Kinder Morgan, Inc. of Houston, Texas.

== History ==
Historically, EPNG's primary market was California, though the growth of competing pipelines into that market and lack of increased demand since 2001 has led to a decrease in its business there, especially in Southern California. At the same time, EPNG's shipping into Arizona has increased, largely because it was the only pipeline into the fast-growing Phoenix area until the TransWestern Phoenix Lateral came in service Q1 2009.

Its largest customers are:

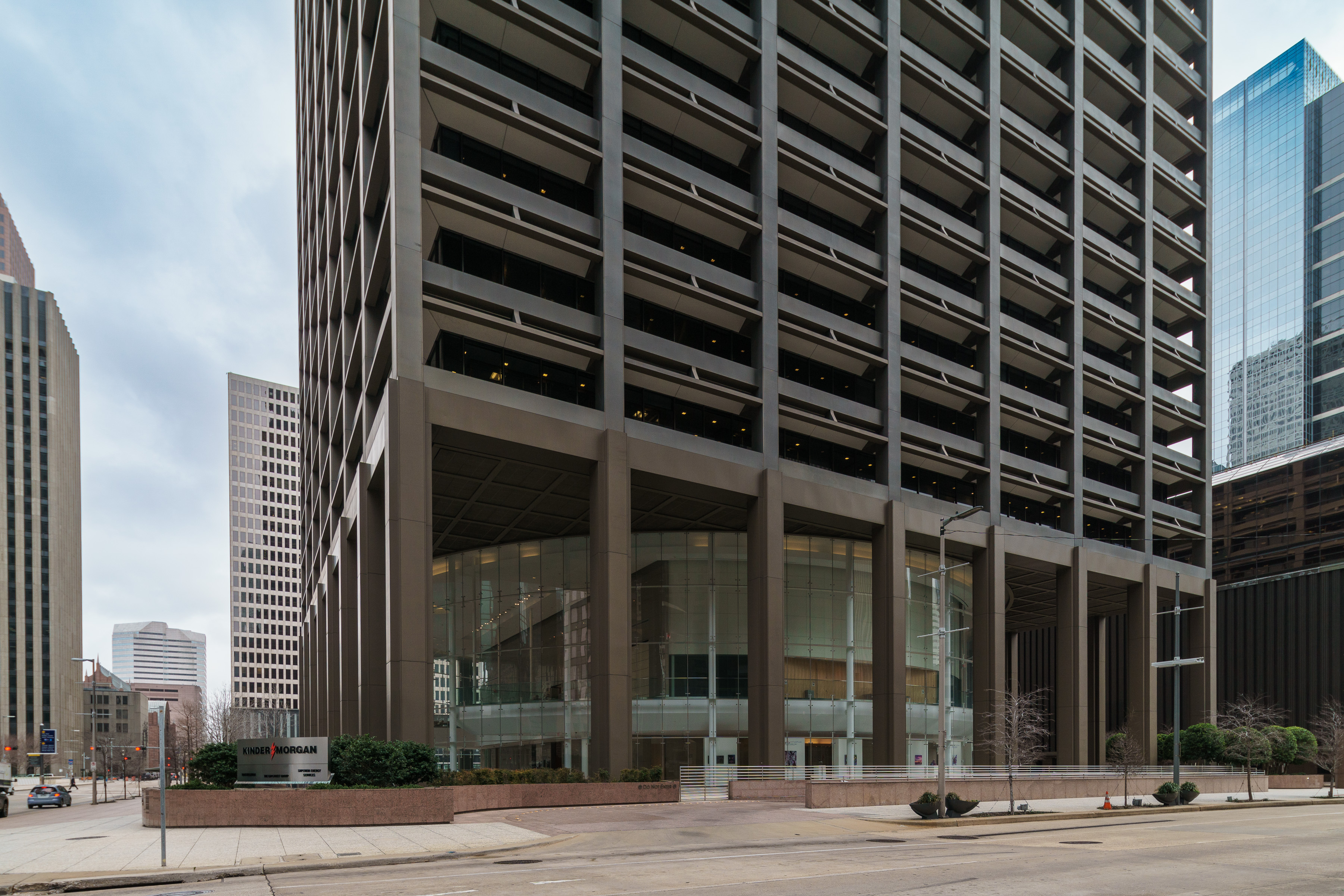
- The Tenneco Building became the El Paso Energy Building after EPNG purchased Tenneco Energy. The building is presently the Kinder Morgan Building.
  Southern California Gas Company (a Sempra Energy subsidiary);
- Southwest Gas Corporation; and
- Pacific Gas and Electric Company.

Its FERC code is 33.

October 1945: In light of depletion of reserves in California by the war and expected future growth. EPNG proposed building 720 miles of 26-inch pipeline ($19.8m) to supply California markets with gas from the Permian Basin in Lea County, New Mexico, work to be finished in the spring or summer of 1947. Line were to end at the Colorado River where it was to connect to the Southern California Gas Company system. Additionally planned were 117 miles (24-inch), 32 miles (18-inch) and 14.5 miles (14-inch) of gathering pipelines ($3.4m), a 105,000,000 cubic feet/day compressor station, dehydration and purification plant at Jal, New Mexico ($2.2m). A limit of 300,000,000 cubic feet/day with additional compressor stations. total cost $25.4m. The line became operational on 13 November 1947.

In the 1970s, EPNG became the El Paso Company. In 1983, the company was acquired by Burlington Northern, Inc. In 1992, Burlington spun off the company as a publicly traded corporation. In 1996 and 1999, the company purchased Tenneco Energy from Tenneco and Sonat, Inc., respectively.

=== Innovations ===
The company pioneered:

- High-pressure, long-distance pipelines
- Innovative pipeline-welding methods
- The use of large, gas turbine-driven centrifugal compressors.
- Treating natural gas to remove impurities.

For many years, the company had more gas-treating capacity than all of other interstate pipelines combined.

In 1967, El Paso joined with the federal agencies to test the use of a nuclear device to fracture or create fractures in gas-bearing formations:

- United States Atomic Energy Commission
- Bureau of Mines of the Department of the Interior

The experiment, called Project Gasbuggy, was considered a success in terms of its objectives. However, it was considered not to be commercially feasible.

== Pipelines ==
- Tennessee Gas Pipeline: Acquired by EPNG in 1996.
- Ruby Pipeline: In 2010, created as a subsidiary and as a planned partnership with Global Infrastructure Partners (GIP) and Pacific Gas & Electric. However, the Ruby Pipeline filed for bankruptcy in 2022.

== See also ==
- Blue Flame Building
