= Blue Flame Building =

- Blue Flame Building (El Paso Natural Gas Company Building)
- U.S. National Register of Historic Places
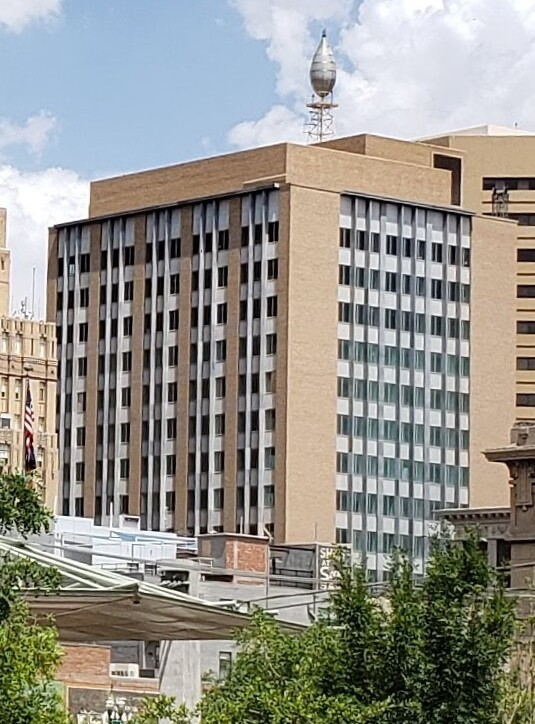
- Blue Flame Building at night after recent renovations in 2021
- Location: 120 N. Stanton
- Coordinates: 31°45′33″N 106°29′10″W
- Built: 1954
- Architect: Carroll and Daeuble
- NRHP reference No.: 100002129
- Added to NRHP: February 13, 2018

The Blue Flame Building or the El Paso Natural Gas Company Building is a skyscraper in El Paso, Texas. It was briefly the tallest building in El Paso upon its completion in 1954. The building housed the El Paso Natural Gas Company until 1996 when the El Paso Independent School District (EPISD) housed employees there for a few years. The Housing Authority of the City of El Paso (HACEP) recently completed a $52 million major renovation in 2021 that includes retail spaces, offices, and low-income apartments.

The building has been listed on the National Register of Historic Places since February 13, 2018. Its most unique feature is the 21-foot tall flame weather beacon.

== About ==
The Blue Flame Building or the El Paso Natural Gas Company Building is an 18 story building and 230 feet tall. It has a steel-beam internal structure and a basement. the exterior of the building is finished with granite. It was designed by the architectural firm of Carroll and Daeuble in 1952 using a design first created by architect, Kenneth Franzheim. It was constructed by the Robert E. McKee Construction Company who were awarded the contract in 1953. Upon its completion in 1954, the building was considered a "showcase of the latest in industrial construction" by the El Paso Times. The modern partition feature allowed flexible space planning. It was the tallest building in El Paso at the time of its completion and provided a view from the top into Ciudad Juárez and the surrounding El Paso area.

A unique feature of the building is the 21 foot high flame-like structure made of plexiglass and constructed by the Federal Sign and Signal Company. The flame was intended to be a weather beacon that would be lit up with different colors to reflect the changing weather forecast. When the flame was blue, that indicated no change to the weather. A red flame indicated warmer weather, while a gold flame meant cooler weather was coming. When the flame "flickered" that indicated wind or precipitation was forecast. The flame would be turned off temporarily from time to time in order to clean it. While the flame was in operation from its beginning, it had one operator for forty years who called the National Weather Service in order to know what color to light the flame.

== History ==
The ground space for the building was sold for $75,000 by Dexter R. Mapel in 1949. Another $262,500 was sold to H.P. Kopf for "properties taken into the utility building site." The building cost a total of $5 million upon completion. It was originally known as the El Paso Natural Gas Company building and was meant to house the company by the same name and provide a consolidated space for all of the employees. Other occupants of the building included the E.F. Hutton and Co. firm and there was commercial space for others on the first floor.

When the building opened in 1954, it provided office space for 1,000 gas company employees, a coffee shop and 99-seat auditorium on the fifth floor and a hospital set-up on the third floor attended by a registered nurse. The sixteenth floor was for gas company executives and the president of the El Paso Natural Gas Company, Paul Kayser, and other management-level employees had offices on the seventeenth floor. The lobby, opening out to Texas Street depicted illustrations of El Paso Natural Gas Company work. The large flame-like structure on the top of the building was first tested in March 1955 and finally turned on permanently a week later. The first time the flame was lit, it was red, indicating warmer weather was coming. An open house tour of the building also took place in March 1955.

During the Christmas season, the building would light up office windows at night in a cross-shaped formation. The practice, at one time common with taller buildings in many cities, ended during the energy crisis in the 1970s.

In the 1980s, the El Paso Natural Gas Company decided to move to another building, though promising that the flame on top of the original building would remain in place. In 1986, El Paso County considered buying the building. County Judge Pat O'Rourke had pursued a deal that would include the Blue Flame Building and two other buildings for a total purchase of $10 million. Instead, in 1996, the El Paso Independent School District (EPISD) accepted the building as a gift from Southern Union Gas. EPISD would place many of its administrative staff in the building. However in 2000, EPISD superintendent, Gilberto Anzaldua, planned to move the employees out of the building and sell it for an appraised value of $4 million. Employees were moved out by July 2001. By 2003, the school district was still considering whether or not to sell the building. It was eventually sold to Bob Jones, a businessman in El Paso in 2004 for around $1.6 million. In 2006, El Paso businessman, Paul Foster, purchased the building in a package deal.

By 2018, the Housing Authority of the City of El Paso (HACEP) had started working on renovating the building to support offices and low-income apartments. On February 13, 2018, the Blue Flame Building was designated a landmark on the National Register of Historic Places. The landmark designation has provided tax credits that can be used for the projected $52 million renovation. The renovation was completed in 2021.
