= Central West Public Service Corporation =

American utility company

Central West Public Service Corporation was a Chicago, Illinois-based utility company that operated in Iowa, South Dakota, Texas, and Minnesota. It owned stock in other utilities that operated in Illinois, North Carolina, North Dakota, Nebraska, Virginia, and West Virginia.

Its failure in 1934 reflects the difficult economic climate of the Great Depression and the inability of large utilities, with significant market capitalizations, to remain solvent.

== Insolvency ==
The power corporation went into receivership in March 1934 after defaulting on interest payments on its first lien collateral gold bonds, its ten-year convertible 6% debentures, and its 7% gold notes. Three receivers for the firm were appointed, first in Wilmington, Delaware and Sioux City, Iowa, and later in Chicago. Central West Public Service Corporation reported an outstanding indebtedness of $12,800,000 at the time of its failure.
