= Equitable recoupment =

Equitable recoupment is a judicially created defense most commonly applied in legal cases in the federal and state tax systems of the U.S. This doctrine can allow, under specific circumstances, the government to defeat a refund claim or a taxpayer to avoid an assessment on the basis of a past underpayment or overpayment that is outside the statute of limitations period.

Although many of the applications are in cases involving tax law, it also has been applied to cases where revenue from the use of city property had been overpaid in terms of revenue due to the city, as was found in Grace v. City of Carlsbad.

== Specific requirements ==
The specific conditions for equitable recoupment to be considered are:

1. The overpayment or money that is due for of offset is barred by time (an expired period of limitations).
2. The time-barred overpayment or deficiency arose out of the same transaction, item, or taxable event as the overpayment or deficiency before the court.
3. The transaction, item, or taxable event has been inconsistently subjected to two taxes.
4. If the transaction, item, or taxable event involves two or more taxpayers, there is sufficient identity of interest between the taxpayers subject to the two taxes that the taxpayers should be treated as one.

== Case history ==
In Wisconsin Department of Revenue v. Van Engel, 230 Wis. 2d 607, 609 (Wis. Ct. App. 1999), the court had ruled that equitable recoupment can only occur when:

- An untimely refund claim would be set off against the timely assessment occurs within the same transaction or tax year.
- It can be used as a defense to an assessment made during the same transaction or tax period.

In Grace v. City of Carlsbad, 126 N.M. 95 (N.M. Ct. App. 1998), the City of Carlsbad had received an overpayment of oil and gas royalties on its city property. The oil and gas operator, Corinne B. Grace, applied the theory of equitable recourse in the hearing as a way to recover the overpayment, as a way around the expiration of the statute of limitations time period.
