= Thomas L. Kivisto =

US basketball player and businessman

Tom Kivisto is an American businessman who co-founded SemGroup, a petrochemicals company, in April 2000. He served as its president and chief executive officer until July 18, 2008. (Note: Kivisto, Gregory Wallace and Kevin Foxx started SemGroup growing it into one of the nation's largest privately-held energy trading, storage and transport firms.) Under his leadership, SemGroup completed more than 40 acquisitions and its assets grew from $227.4 million in 2000 to more than $3.6 billion in 2005. Kivisto was replaced by Terry Ronan in 2008, following the news that SemGroup was experiencing liquidity issues and was considering filing for Chapter 11 bankruptcy.

== Education ==
Kivisto's father, Ernie, was a successful high school basketball coach who won more than 1,000 games in his coaching career. Coached by his father, Tom Kivisto was a star point guard at East Aurora High School near Chicago. He then earned a bachelor's degree from the University of Kansas, majoring in pre-med/psychology and playing for the basketball team from 1970 to 1974. While there, Kivisto was a member of the university's 1971 and 1974 NCAA Final Four teams. He was named Academic All American, All Big 8 and Academic All Big 8. He holds the single game assist record for the Kansas team. His post-graduate work was in urban planning. He is a member of the Illinois Basketball Hall of Fame.

== Career ==
Kivisto moved his family to Tulsa, Oklahoma in 1993 after having lived in Wichita, Kansas for 15 years working for Koch Industries. He started his own services company, SemGroup, which became one of the largest privately held companies in the United States.

Kivisto donated over $15 million to his alma mater, the University of Kansas, to help finance the building of new football facilities at the school. He serves on the board of directors of Saint Francis Health System, Family & Children's Services, and Project Single Parent, a nonprofit organization of which he is a cofounder. In 2006, Kivisto also was named to the University of Tulsa Board of Trustees. In 2006, The Pipe Liners Club of Tulsa recognized Kivisto with its President's Award. In January 2007, TulsaPeople Magazine named Kivisto "Tulsan of the Year" for 2006.

In 2006, Kivisto borrowed $15 million from Bank of America and guaranteed the loan through his personal trust company's limited partnership interest in SemGroup. In 2008, SemGroup filed for Chapter 11 bankruptcy protection.
