= Natural Gas Policy Act of 1978 =

Federal legislation in response to US natural gas shortage

Natural Gas Policy Act
- Long title: Natural Gas Policy Act of 1978
- Enacted by: the 95th United States Congress
- Effective: 11/9/1978

Legislative history
- Signed into law by President Jimmy Carter on November 9, 1978

The Natural Gas Policy Act of 1978 (NGPA) is federal legislation that was enacted as a response to US natural gas shortages of 1976–77. It was enacted for the following motivations:

- To create a balance between natural gas supply and demand,
- Create a national gas market, and
- Transition to market-based prices.

In the 1970s, natural gas was persistently in short supply throughout the 1970s, largely because of wellhead price regulation and the 1973 OPEC oil embargo.

The NGPA:

- Authorized the Federal Energy Regulatory Commission (FERC) to regulate interstate and some intrastate natural gas production and transportation.
- Was designed to encourage the development of new natural gas supplies by gradually deregulating wellhead gas prices.
- Established maximum lawful prices (ceilings) for the sale of natural gas, which were phased out over a series of years, allowing market forces to set natural gas prices.

The act was intended to raise natural gas rates to market clearing levels. The NGPA was the first building block in a plan from the Carter Administration to increase energy supply while reducing domestic consumption of energy. It preceded the Energy Security Act that President Carter signed into law in 1980.

== Effect on natural gas supply ==
The NGPA set prices based on where natural gas was old, new, or of high cost. New gas paid a higher price than older gas, which in turn encouraged oil and gas producers to produce from new sources of natural gas. However, this pricing system created a risk for higher prices for consumers as well as inhibiting production for the existing vast old gas reservoirs.

== Wellhead price controls ==
The wellhead price controls found in the act had a direct effect on natural gas industry commerce. The following are the sections of the NGPA Title 1, Wellhead Price Controls:

- Section 101. Inflation adjustment; other general price ceiling rules.
- Section 102. Ceiling price for new natural gas and certain natural gas produced from the Outer Continental Shelf.
- Section 103. Ceiling price for new, onshore production wells.
- Section 104. Ceiling price for sales of natural gas dedicated to interstate commerce.
- Section 105. Ceiling price for sales under existing intrastate contracts.
- Section 106. Ceiling price for sales under rollover contracts.
- Section 107. Ceiling price for high-cost natural gas.
- Section 108. Ceiling price for stripper well natural gas.
- Section 109. Ceiling price for other categories of natural gas.
- Section 110. Treatment of State severance taxes and certain production-related costs

=== Section 108. Ceiling price for stripper well natural gas ===
Stripper wells are wells that are marginally productive. In recent history, stripper well production makes up about 8.2% of United States natural gas production.

The NGPA defined a stripper well as essentially a well that produces less than 60 Mcf (60,000 cubic feet) per day during any 90-day interval. However, there was an exclusion or exemption for wells that had the application of what is defined as enhanced recovery in the NPGA. Nonassociated natural gas (gas from different geological zones) which is produced from a stripper well that actually exceeds 60 Mcf during any 90-day production period may continue to qualify as stripper well natural gas if the increase in this well production was the result of the application of recognized enhanced recovery technique.

== See also ==
- United States energy law
