= Morrow Group =

Geologic formation in various part of the United States

Morrow Formation
- Stratigraphic range: Pennsylvanian
- Type: Formation
- Area: New Mexico, Texas, Oklahoma, Kansas, and Arkansas

Location
- Country: United States

The Morrow Formation is a geologic formation from the Pennsylvanian geological age that is found in locations ranging from Southeast New Mexico and West Texas to locations in Oklahoma, Southwestern Kansas, and Arkansas. It preserves fossils dating back to the Carboniferous period.

== Arkansas Morrow Sands ==
Published research on the Morrow Formation goes back to 1904 in research discussing the zinc and lead deposits of northern Arkansas.

== New Mexico Morrow Sands ==
The Morrow Formation is found in the Delaware Basin of southeastern New Mexico.

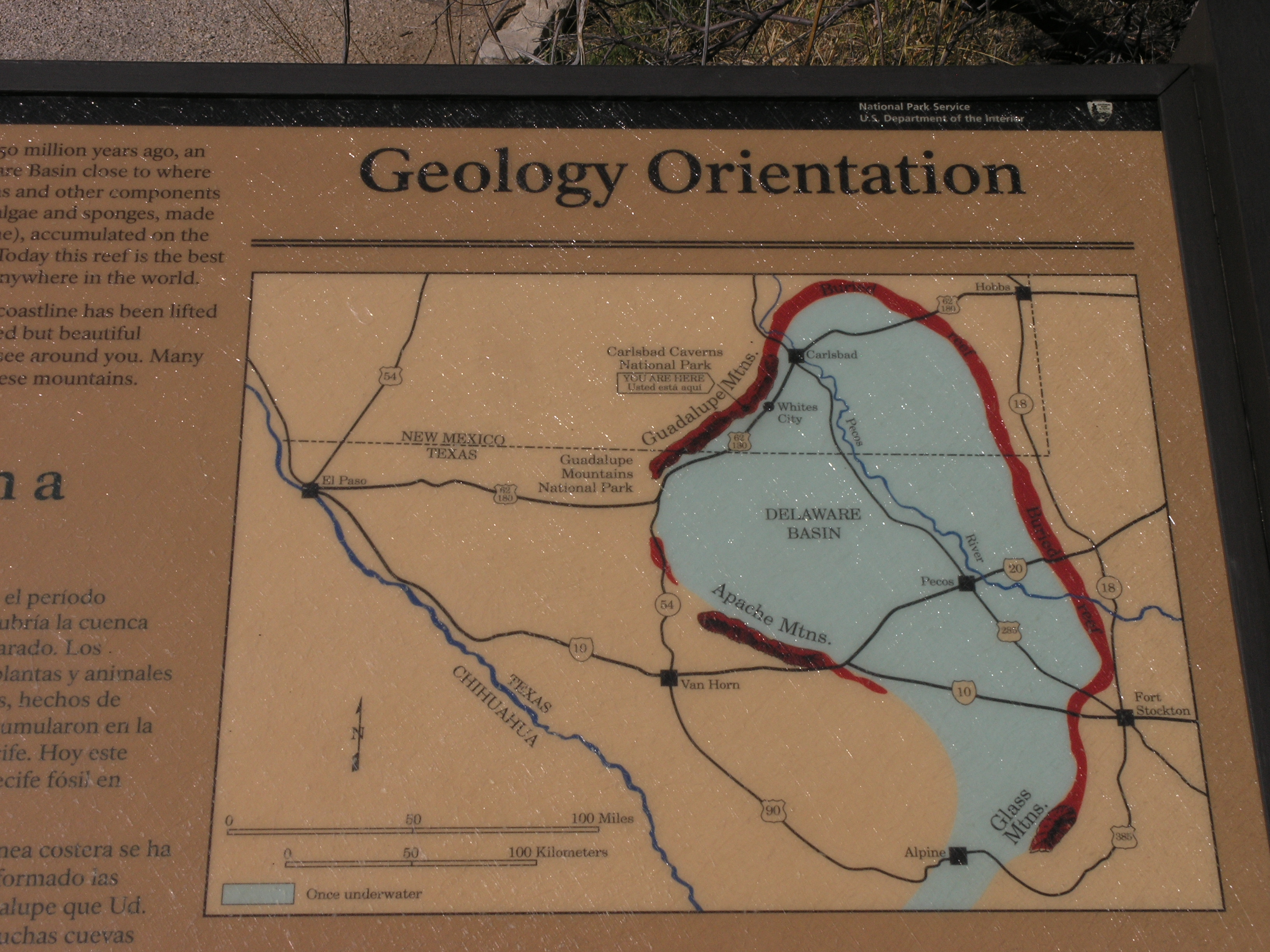
Map of Delaware Basin. Morrow sand was largely deposited in the NW Shelf of the basin

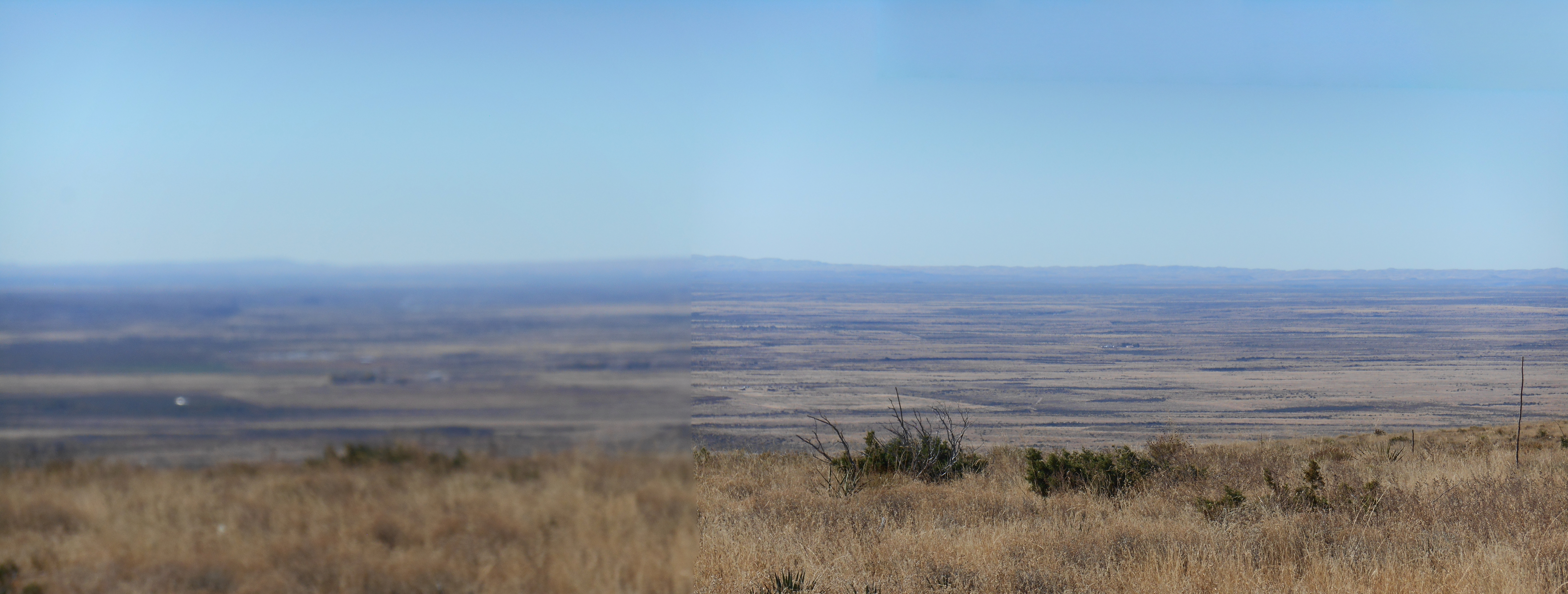
An example of the flatness found in the region. Image from near the Carlsbad Caverns in Carlsbad, New Mexico.

It can be found at depths of 8,200 to 12,500 feet. In some parts of southeast Eddy County and west areas of Lea counties, New Mexico, it may be found as deep as 15,000 feet.

Unique characteristics of this formation are:

- Limited areal extent (limited area to be found on a map)
- Wide variations of permeability

The Morrow facies (body of rock with specific characteristics) was deposited in a complex of mixed siliciclastic (mostly silica bearing rock) and carbonate depositional environments.

The Morrow Formation is typically divided into two intervals:

- The Morrow clastics
- The overlying Morrow limestones

=== Analogue to depositional process ===
In Prediction of reservoir geometries in the Morrow of southeastern New Mexico, the southern shelf of Belize, Central America is considered an analogue in the present time to the depositional process that had taken place in the Morrowan in SE New Mexico, during the time of the ancient Delaware Sea.

== See also ==
- List of fossiliferous stratigraphic units in Oklahoma
- Paleontology in Oklahoma
