= Natural Gas Wellhead Decontrol Act of 1989 =

Natural Gas Wellhead Decontrol Act
- Long title: Natural Gas Wellhead Decontrol Act of 1989
- Enacted by: the 101st United States Congress

Legislative history
- Signed into law by President George H. W. Bush on July 26, 1989

The Natural Gas Wellhead Decontrol Act of 1989 (NGWDA) is an act that amends the Natural Gas Policy Act of 1978 to declare that the price guidelines for the first sale of natural gas do not apply to:

1. Expired, terminated, or post-enactment contracts executed after the date of enactment of this Act; and
2. Certain renegotiated contracts.

It would initiate decontrols as of May 15, 1991, for natural gas produced from newly spudded wells. It permanently repealed wellhead price controls beginning on January 1, 1993.

By means of Senate bill 783, the NGWDA was amended to eliminate wellhead price and nonprice controls on the first sale of natural gas, and to make technical and conforming amendments to the NGWDA. The bill describes interim elimination of lawful prices and makes permanent elimination of wellhead price controls effective on January 1, 1993.

== Criticism ==
In the Federal Energy Regulatory Commission (FERC) hearing Corinne Grace v. El Paso Natural Gas (1990), FERC states its reservation about this type of law being used to the detriment of oil and gas operators with limited resources to defend themselves from cancelled contracts by large pipeline companies.

The University of Arkansas at Little Rock Law Review address this act in its 1989 article Our Experience Under the Natural Gas Policy Act of 1978, and Its Relevance to the Natural Gas Wellhead Decontrol Act of 1989 with the following conclusion:

The drafting of the Decontrol Act was the result of a political compromise. The history of natural gas regulation is replete with political compromises that eventually hurt the gas industry or consumers. Congress, in refusing to learn from history, may have doomed the natural gas industry by repeating past mistakes. Alfred Kahn, in discussing the dismantling of the Civil Aeronautics Board, said that a short transition from regulation to free market is desirable in order to limit the distortions of the transition. By ignoring this wisdom and by ignoring our experience under the NGPA in the early 1980s, we may have condemned the natural gas industry and its consumers to suffer these distortions for another two years.
