= Energy Transfer =

American energy pipeline company

Energy Transfer LP
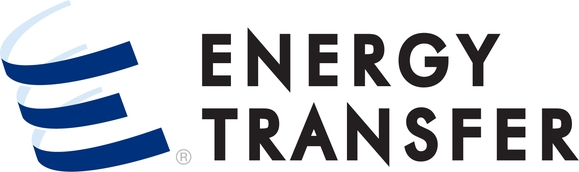
- Type: Public
- Traded as: NYSE: ET
- Industry: Petroleum industry
- Founded: 1996; 30 years ago
- Founder: Kelcy Warren; Ray Davis
- Headquarters: Dallas, Texas, U.S.
- Key people: Kelcy Warren (chairman); Thomas E. Long (co-CEO); Marshall S. McCrea III (co-CEO); Dylan A. Bramhall (CFO); Rick Perry (director)
- Products: Pipeline transport
- Revenue: ▲$82.671 billion (2024)
- Net income: ▲$6.565 billion (2024)
- Total assets: ▲$125.38 billion (2024)
- Total equity: ▲$46.017 billion (2024)
- Number of employees: 16,248 (2024)
- Subsidiaries: Sunoco; Lake Charles LNG
- Website: energytransfer.com

Energy Transfer LP is an American company engaged in the pipeline transportation, storage, and terminaling for natural gas, crude oil, natural gas liquids (NGLs), refined products and liquid natural gas, as well as NGL fractionation. It is a publicly traded limited partnership organized under Delaware state laws and headquartered in Dallas, Texas. It was founded in 1996 by Ray Davis and Kelcy Warren, who remains Executive Chairman.

As of 2025, the company owns or operates approximately 140,000 miles of pipelines throughout the U.S., making it one of the largest midstream companies in the country. It is also one of the largest exporters of NGLs in the world.

== Business structure ==
Energy Transfer owns controlling interests in Sunoco LP. It also owns 46% non-economic general partner interest and approximately 38% of the outstanding common units of USA Compression Partners L.P., and 100% of Lake Charles LNG which consists of an LNG import terminal and regasification facility near Lake Charles, Louisiana.

Energy Transfer's natural gas business includes approximately 105,000 miles (169,000 km) of natural gas transportation pipelines that receive natural gas from other mainline transportation pipelines, storage facilities and gathering systems and deliver the natural gas to industrial end-users, storage facilities, utilities and other pipelines.

Energy Transfer owns:

- 36.4% of the Dakota Access Pipeline and the Energy Transfer Crude Oil Pipeline.
- 60% of the Bayou Bridge Pipeline,
- 50% of the Florida Gas Transmission pipeline,
- 100% of the Trunkline Pipeline,
- 100% of the Transwestern Pipeline,
- 100% of the Desert Southwest Pipeline,
- 100% of the Panhandle Eastern,
- 100% of Sunoco Logistics Partners Operations L.P. and Sunoco Pipeline L.P.
- 100% of the Sea Robin Pipeline, the Revolution Pipeline, the Mariner East pipelines, and
- 32.6% of the Rover pipeline.

As of 2024, it controlled more than 62,200 miles of pipelines in the state of Texas, along with major terminals and facilities in Houston, Nederland, and Mount Belvieu Texas.

== History ==
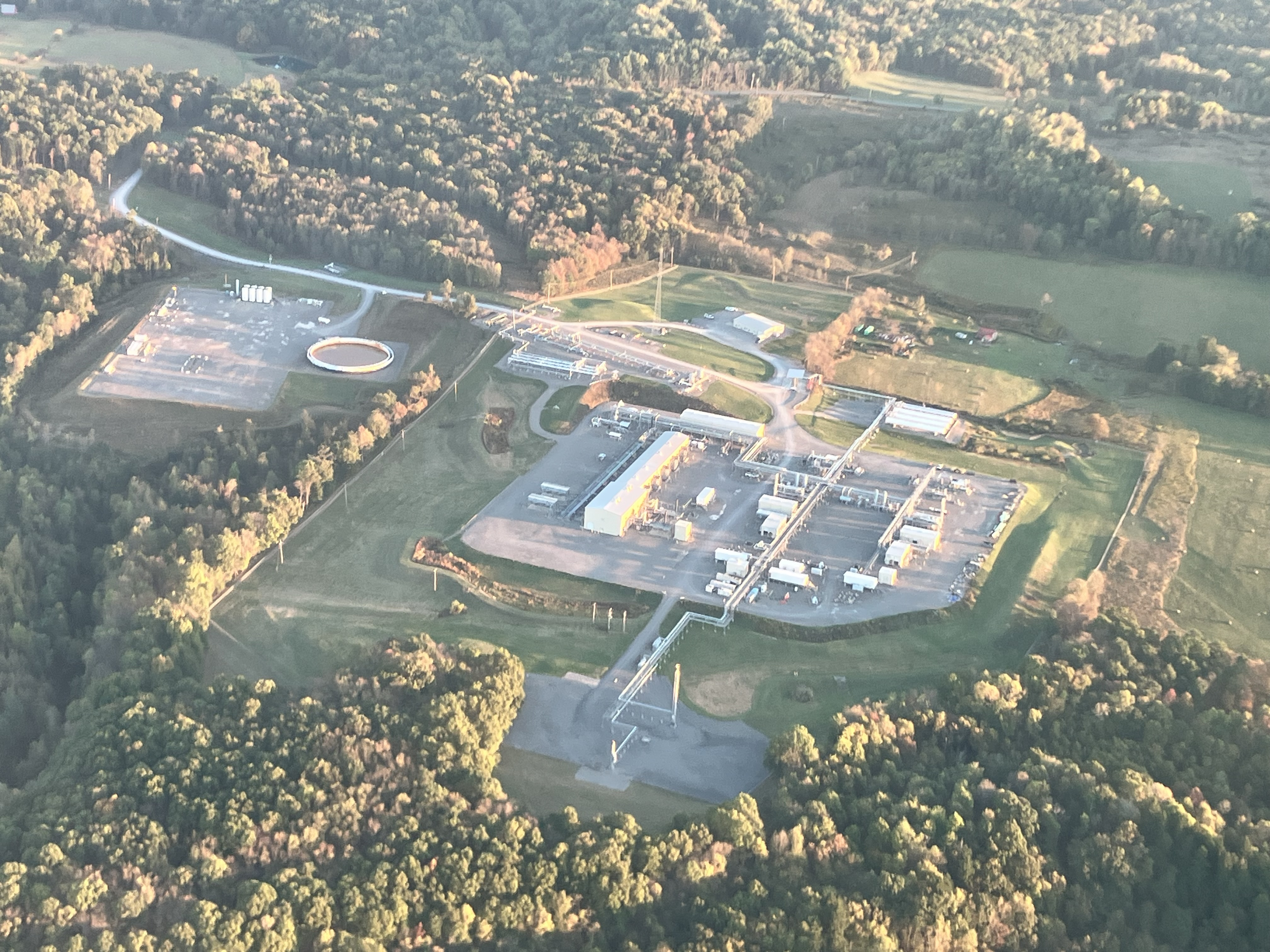
Energy Transfer facility in Pennsylvania

The company was founded by Kelcy Warren and Ray Davis in 1996. In 2011, Energy Transfer and Regency Energy Partners formed a joint venture to purchase midstream assets from Louis Dreyfus Highbridge Energy for $2 billion, now known as Castleton Commodities International.

In October 2012, Sunoco, Inc., became a wholly owned subsidiary of the company. It acquired the general partner interests, 100% of the incentive distribution rights, and a 32.4% limited partnership interest in Sunoco Logistics Partners L.P., which operates a geographically diverse portfolio of crude oil and refined products pipelines, terminating and crude oil acquisition and marketing assets. The same year it acquired Southern Union Company which added more than 20,000 miles of gathering and transportation pipeline to its portfolio.

In August 2014, the company acquired Susser Holdings Corporation, which operated Stripes Convenience Stores, a chain of 580 stores located in Texas, New Mexico, and Oklahoma, which were re-branded under the Sunoco and A-Plus names.

In January 2015, the company acquired Regency Energy Partners for $11 billion. During the same year, the company also agreed to purchase Williams for around $32.6 billion, however the acquisition was terminated by Energy Transfer in June 2016. Energy Transfer was later ordered to pay Williams a breakup fee of $410 million.

In October 2018, Energy Transfer Equity completed its acquisition of Energy Transfer Partners, simplifying the partnership as one operating entity known as Energy Transfer LP. In September 2019, the company acquired SemGroup for $5 billion. In January 2020, former Energy Secretary Rick Perry rejoined the company's board.

In August 2023, it was announced Energy Transfer had signed a definitive agreement to acquire its Houston-headquartered rival, Crestwood Equity Partners for approximately $7.1 billion. The acquisition of Houston-headquartered Crestwood Equity Partners was completed in early 2025, further expanding Energy Transfer’s midstream footprint.

In 2025, Energy Transfer announced the Desert Southwest Pipeline, a 516 mile natural gas project connecting the Permian Basin to markets in Arizona and New Mexico, expected to be operational in 2029.

=== Dakota Access Pipeline ===
Dakota Access, LLC is owned 36.4% by the company and built the Bakken pipeline, also known as the Dakota Access Pipeline. In April 2016, the United States Environmental Protection Agency, United States Department of the Interior, and Advisory Council on Historic Preservation requested a full Environmental Impact Statement of the pipeline. In July 2016, the Standing Rock Sioux Tribe filed an injunction against the U.S. Army Corps of Engineers to stop building the pipeline. A group of young activists from Standing Rock ran from North Dakota to Washington, D.C., to present a petition in protest of the construction of the pipeline and launched an international campaign called ReZpect Our Water. In October 2016, Dakota Access Pipeline protests erupted at a construction site near the Cannonball River in North Dakota, resulting in the arrest of hundreds and the use of force by a private security company, North Dakota State and county police, and the North Dakota National Guard.

In August 2017, Energy Transfer filed lawsuits against environmental groups Greenpeace USA, BankTrack and Earth First! under the Patriot Act. A federal court dismissed the case in 2019. The lawsuit alleged Greenpeace USA misled the public with false claims about the Standing Rock Sioux tribes' sacred sites and the likelihood the pipeline would contaminate the Missouri River in North Dakota. In contrast, a 2018 Greenpeace report said Energy Transfer pipelines and those owned by the company's subsidiaries "spilled over 500 times in the last decade." A second civil suit in 2025 sought $300 million in damages from Greenpeace, alleging a leadership role by the organization in the Dakota Access Pipeline protests which Greenpeace denies. A jury awarded $666.8 million in damages to Energy Transfer, holding Greenpeace USA and its affiliates (including Greenpeace Fund and Greenpeace International) liable. Greenpeace is appealing the ruling.

== Political activity ==
As of August 2026, the organization spent $15.2 million in support of Republican candidates in the 2026 United States elections.
