= Stripper well =

Type of gas or oil well

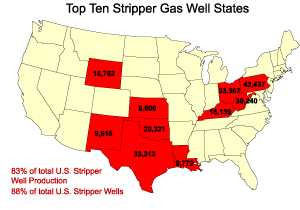
The top ten US stripper well states.

A stripper well or marginal well is a natural gas well or oil well that is nearing the end of its economically useful life. In the United States a "stripper" gas well is defined by the Interstate Oil and Gas Compact Commission as one that produces 60,000 cubic feet (1,700 m^{3}) or less of gas per day at its maximum flow rate; the Internal Revenue Service, for tax purposes, uses a threshold of 90,000 cubic feet (2,500 m^{3}) per day. Oil wells are generally classified as stripper wells when they produce 15 barrels per day or less for any twelve-month period.

In 2023, 77% of the 920,000 oil and gas producing wells in the United States were wells which produced less than 15 barrels of oil equivalent per day (BOE/d).

Stripper wells contribute 6% of United States oil and natural gas production, but are responsible for nearly half of the methane emissions in the oil and gas sector.

== Economic importance ==
In the United States in 2015, 11 percent of crude oil produced comes from a marginal oil well, and over 85 percent of the total number of U.S. oil wells are now classified as such. There are over 420,000 of these wells in the United States, and together they produce nearly 915,000 barrels (145,500 m^{3}) of oil per day, 18 percent of U.S. production.

Additionally, as of 2006, there are more than 296,000 natural gas stripper wells in the lower 48 states. Together they account for over 1.7 trillion cubic feet (4.8×10^{10} m^{3}) of natural gas, or about 9 percent of the natural gas produced in the lower 48 states. Stripper wells are more common in older oil and gas producing regions, most notably in Appalachia, Texas and Oklahoma.

A stripper well may cost between $10 and $30 per barrel to operate, averaging $2,000 per month.

=== Taxation ===
In Oklahoma, the regular tax rate is 7 percent, but may be 1 percent for marginal wells. In Michigan, stripper well tax is 4 percent. Other tax exemptions can be 15 percent of gross income. A 2005 tax credit for prices below $30/barrel was rarely in effect.

== Premature abandonment ==
Many of these wells are marginally economic and at risk of being prematurely abandoned. When world oil prices were in the low tens in the late 1990s, the oil that flowed from marginal wells often cost more to produce than the price it brought on the market. From 1994 to 2006, approximately 177,000 marginal wells were plugged and abandoned, representing a number equal to 42 percent of all operating wells in 2006, costing the U.S. more than $3.8 billion in lost oil revenue at the EIA 2004 average world oil price.

When marginal wells are prematurely abandoned, significant quantities of oil remain behind. In most instances, the remaining reserves are not easily accessible when oil prices subsequently rise again: when marginal fields are abandoned, the surface infrastructure – the pumps, piping, storage vessels, and other processing equipment – is removed and the lease forfeited. Since much of this equipment was probably installed over many years, replacing it over a short period should oil prices jump upward is cost prohibitive. Oil prices would have to rise beyond their historic highs and remain at elevated levels for many years before there would be sufficient economic justification to bring many marginal fields back into production.

== Sources ==
- The Stripper Well Consortium
- DOE - Fossil Energy: DOE's Marginal/Stripper Well Revitalization Programs
- DOE - Fossil Energy Techline: Ultra-low Cost Well Monitoring Could Keep Marginal Oil Wells Active
- Data-Linc Group: Oil and Gas/Decreasing Foreign Oil Dependency/by Milking Marginal Oil Wells
