= Transwestern Pipeline =

American natural gas transmission company

- Industry: Petroleum
- Founded: March 11, 1957
- Owner: Energy Transfer

Transwestern Pipeline Company, LLC owns and operates an interstate natural gas transmission system that connects production basins in the San Juan and Rocky Mountain regions of northwest New Mexico and southwest Colorado, the Texas-Oklahoma Panhandle, and the Permian Basin in West Texas and Southeastern New Mexico with major market areas in the West and Southwest, including California, Arizona, Nevada, Texas, and New Mexico. The system also provides access to Texas and Midcontinent connecting pipelines and natural gas market hubs serving western energy markets. Customers include local distribution companies, producers, marketers, electric power generators, and industrial end-users.

Transwestern is a "natural gas company" as defined under the Natural Gas Act and is regulated under the rules and regulations of the Federal Energy Regulatory Commission (FERC).

Warren Petroleum, along with Monterey Oil Company and J. R. Butler founded the Transwestern Pipeline Company on March 11, 1957, and originally supplied natural gas to natural gas pipeline system of Pacific Lighting Gas Supply Company, a subsidiary of the Pacific Lighting Corporation in California.

== Acquisition of Transwestern by a larger corporations ==
At one point, Transwestern was a subsidiary of Enron, when it was purchased by the energy company in 1985.

=== Loan scandal ===
In 2001, Transwestern received the following loans with the corporation serving as the collateral:

- Revolving loans of $330 million from Citibank
- A $220 million from J.P. Morgan Chase.

However, the large part of the proceeds from the financing were subsequently lent to its parent company, Enron, with weak documentation to the loan. FERC ordered Transwestern to disclose its accounting for this transaction. FERC concluded that Transwestern did not expect for its loan to the parent company to be repaid. Transwestern had written off the loan to parent company Enron as a loss of $540 million. However, Transwestern was still considered solvent after the write-off.

=== Enron's bankruptcy ===
The course of events for Transwestern with Enron's later bankruptcy were the following:

- The pipeline company in 2003 was moved into a new company with Enron's two other pipeline companies, Citrus Corporation and Northern Plains Natural Gas Company. The plan was to distribute the shares of the new pipeline company to creditors as part of the planned reorganization.
- Enron later announced the name of the new pipeline corporation as CrossCountry Energy (CCE).
- In 2004, CCE was in turn purchased by CCE Holdings Inc. (CCEH), a joint venture between Southern Union Co. and GE Commercial Finance Energy Financial Service. CCEH was the successful bidder in the U.S. Bankruptcy Court for the Southern District of New York auction of CCE. The state of New Mexico had requested to be a bidder for the company, but its request had been denied. New Mexico stated its objectives to the court in the following statement:
  The critical factor limiting the development of New Mexico's San Juan Basin has been insufficient capacity of the pipeline. Unlike a private company such as Transwestern, or the stalking horse bidder [Southern Union] here, if New Mexico owned the pipeline, it would have a unique interest in increasing the capacity of the pipeline to increase the state's severance and production tax revenues by as much as $50 million or more annually, and by billions over decades to increase other revenue for the state and to create job.

=== Current Ownership ===
- In 2006, 50% of CCEH was purchased by Energy Transfer Partners (ETP). CCEH later redeemed ETP's 50% ownership into 100% ownership of Transwestern.
