= Energy in Brazil =

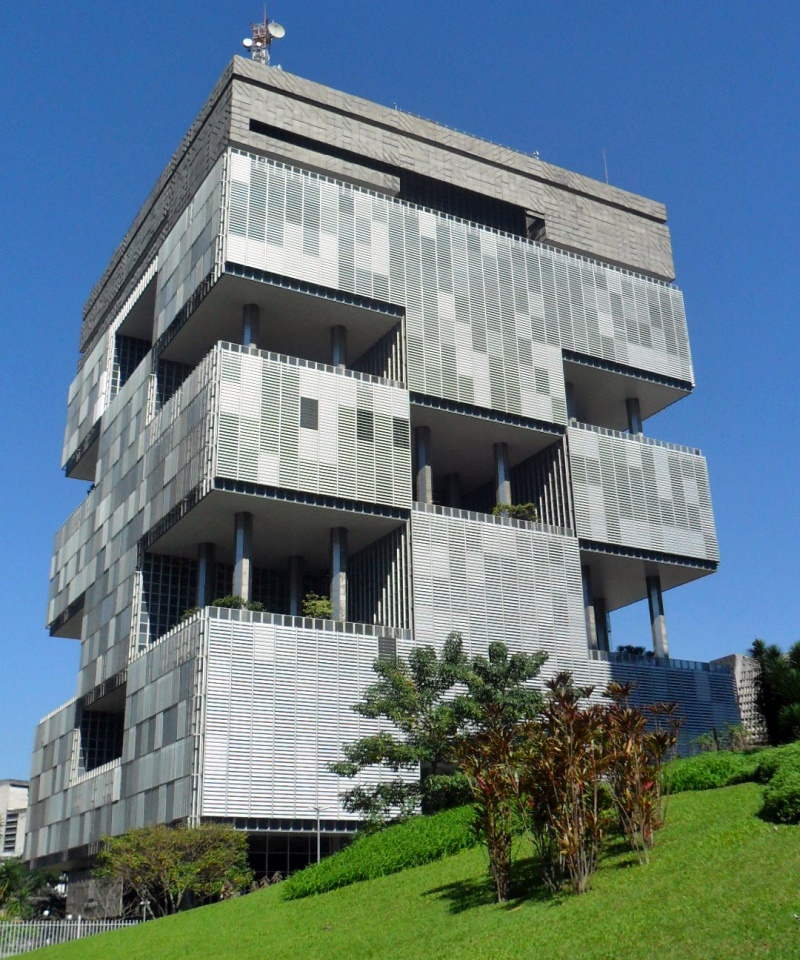
Petrobras headquarters in Rio de Janeiro. The company is the most important energy producer in Brazil and the country's second largest company, after Itaú Unibanco.

Energy mix of Brazil, 1965–2024

Brazil is the 7th largest consumer in the world and the largest in South America. At the same time, it is an important oil and gas producer in the region and the world's second largest ethanol fuel producer. The government agencies responsible for energy policy are the Ministry of Mines and Energy (MME), the National Council for Energy Policy (CNPE), the National Agency of Petroleum, Natural Gas and Biofuels (ANP) and the National Agency of Electricity (ANEEL). State-owned companies Petrobras and Eletrobras are the major companies in Brazil's energy sector, as well as Latin America's.

== Overview ==
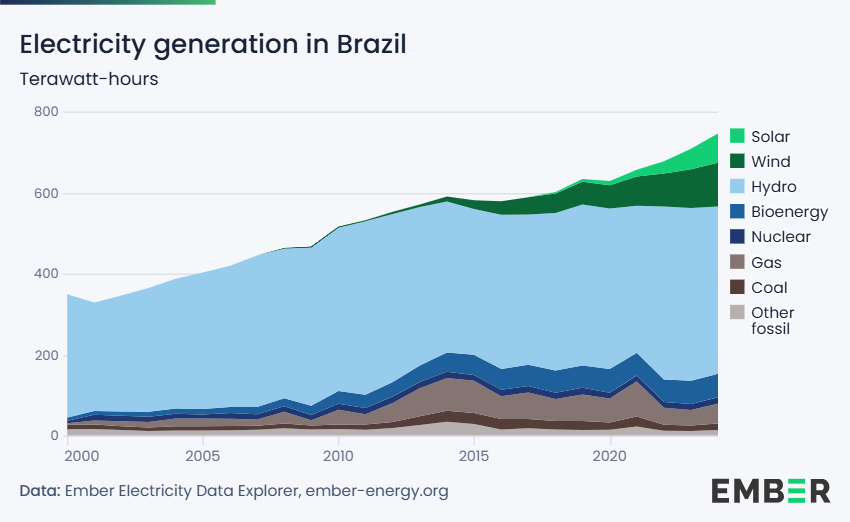
Electricity generation in Brazil per source in terawatt-hours

Development of carbon dioxide emissions

In 2020, Brazil derived roughly one third of its total energy supply from oil, and another third from biofuels. Access to electricity across the country is almost universal, making Brazil’s energy sector one of the least carbon-intensive in the world. Denationalized companies and transnational shareholders are significant part of energy corporations in Brazil.

Brazil's place in the world rankings, 2019
Energy source	indicator	rank	year	quantity	unity	% world	'comments'
Crude oil	Production	9º	2019p	145	Mt	3.3 %	1º : United States (742 Mt), 2º : Russia (560 Mt), 3º : Saudi Arabia (546 Mt)
Electricity	Production	8º	2018	601	TWh	2.3 %	1º : China (7149 TWh), 2º : United States (4434 TWh)
Electricity	Net import	3º	2018	35	TWh	9.3 %	1º : United States (44 TWh), 2º : Italy (44 TWh)
Electricity production by source	Renewables	3º	2018	495	TWh	7.4 %	1º : China (1833 TWh), 2º : United States (743 TWh)
Hydroelectricity	Production	2º	2018	389	TWh	9.0 %	1º : China (1232 TWh), 3º : Canada (386 TWh)
Hydroelectricity	Power installed	2º	2018	105	GW	8.1 %	1º : China (352 GW), 3º : United States (103 GW)
Hydroelectricity	% hydro/electric *	2º	2018	64.7	%		1º : Norway (95.0 %)
Wind power	Electricity production	7º	2018	48	TWh	3,8 %	1º : China (366 TWh), 2º : United States (276 TWh)
Wind power	Power installed	8º	2018	14.4	GW	2.6 %	1º : China (184.3 GW)
Wind power	% wind/electric *	4º	2018	8.1	%		1º : Spain (18.5 %)
Biomass	Primary energy consumption	5º	2019	3915	PJ	6.9 %	1º : India (7998 PJ), 2º : China (5299 PJ), 3º : Nigeria (4929 PJ), 4º : United States (4540 PJ)
Biomass	Electricity production	3º	2019	54.9	TWh	10.1 %	1º : China (111,1 TWh), 2º : United States (56 TWh)
* % hydro/electric : share of hydroelectricity in electricity production (ranking on the top 10 producers) 2019p = provisional estimate for 2019.

Energy in Brazil, 2004–2013
	Capita	Prim. energy	Production	Import	Electricity	CO_{2}-emission
	Million	TWh	TWh	TWh	TWh	Mt
2004	183.9	2,382	2,050	364	360	323
2007	191.6	2,740	2,507	289	413	347
2008	192.0	2,890	2,653	314	429	365
2009	193.7	2,793	2,679	182	426	338
2010	195.0	3,089	2,865	289	465	388
2012	196.7	3,140	2,898	333	480	408
2012R	198.7	3,276	2,930	391	498	440
2013	200.0	3,415	2,941	531	517	517
2014	203.5	3,450				504
Change 2004-10	6.0%	30%	40%	-21%	29%	20%
Mtoe = 11.63 TWh, Prim. energy includes energy losses 2012R = CO2 calculation criteria changed, numbers updated

== Total energy matrix and electric energy matrix ==
The main characteristic of the Brazilian energy matrix is that it is much more renewable than that of the world. While in 2019 the world matrix was only 14% made up of renewable energy, Brazil's was at 45%. Petroleum and oil products made up 34.3% of the matrix; sugar cane derivatives, 18%; hydraulic energy, 12.4%; natural gas, 12.2%; firewood and charcoal, 8.8%; varied renewable energies, 7%; mineral coal, 5.3%; nuclear, 1.4%, and other non-renewable energies, 0.6%.

In the electric energy matrix, the difference between Brazil and the world is even greater: while the world only had 25% of renewable electric energy in 2019, Brazil had 83%. The Brazilian electric matrix is composed of: hydroelectric energy, 64.9%; biomass, 8.4%; wind energy, 8.6%; solar electric, 1%; natural gas, 9.3%; oil products, 2%; nuclear, 2.5%; coal and derivatives, 3.3%.

== Energy and electricity mix ==
=== Energy ===
In 2021, Brazil's energy consumption comprised a mix of sources, with crude oil and other petroleum liquids making up 44.2%, followed by renewables (including hydro) at 37.5%, natural gas at 11.6%, coal at 5.5%, and nuclear at 1.3%. Brazil's total energy production grew by an average annual rate of 1.5% from 2011 to 2021, primarily fueled by petroleum and other liquids. In 2021, Brazil's energy production accounted for 2.0% of global production and 48.8% of South America's total. Energy consumption in Brazil increased at a slower pace, with an average annual growth rate of 0.5% between 2011 and 2021, compared to 3.3% between 2000 and 2010. Brazil continues to be one of the world's largest energy consumers, accounting for 2.0% of global consumption and 53.3% of South America’s consumption.

=== Electricity ===
In 2021, Brazil's electricity generation was primarily driven by renewables, accounting for 75.9% of the total electricity produced, with hydro contributing 54.8% and other renewables making up 21.1%. Following renewables, natural gas contributed 14.5%, while coal and nuclear energy each contributed 4.0% and 2.2%, respectively. Crude oil and other petroleum liquids contributed 3.4%. Brazil ranks as the world's third-largest hydropower producer, following China and Canada. In 2021, Brazil's hydroelectricity generation amounted to 363 terawatt-hours, representing 9% of global hydropower output.

== Energy sector reforms ==
At the end of the 1990s and the beginning of the 2000s, Brazil's energy sector underwent market liberalization. In 1997, the Petroleum Investment Law was adopted, establishing a legal and regulatory framework, and liberalizing oil production. It created the CNPE and the ANP, increased use of natural gas, increased competition in the energy market, and increased investment in power generation. The state monopoly on oil and gas exploration ended, and energy subsidies were reduced. However, the government retained monopoly control of key energy complexes and regulated the price of certain energy products.

Current government policies concentrate mainly on improving energy efficiency in both residential and industrial sectors, as well as increasing use of renewable energy. Further restructuring of the energy sector will be one of the key issues for ensuring sufficient energy investments to meet the rising need for fuel and electricity.

The expansion of Brazil's LNG market is attributed to increased domestic usage, developments in infrastructure, and reforms within the market. In 2021, natural gas represented 7% of Brazil's total energy production, up from 5% in 2011, and constituted 12% of total energy consumption, up from 8% in 2011. The New Gas Law, approved in 2020, aims to foster a more competitive market, facilitate third-party access to infrastructure, and attract private investment.

== Energy sources ==
=== Oil ===
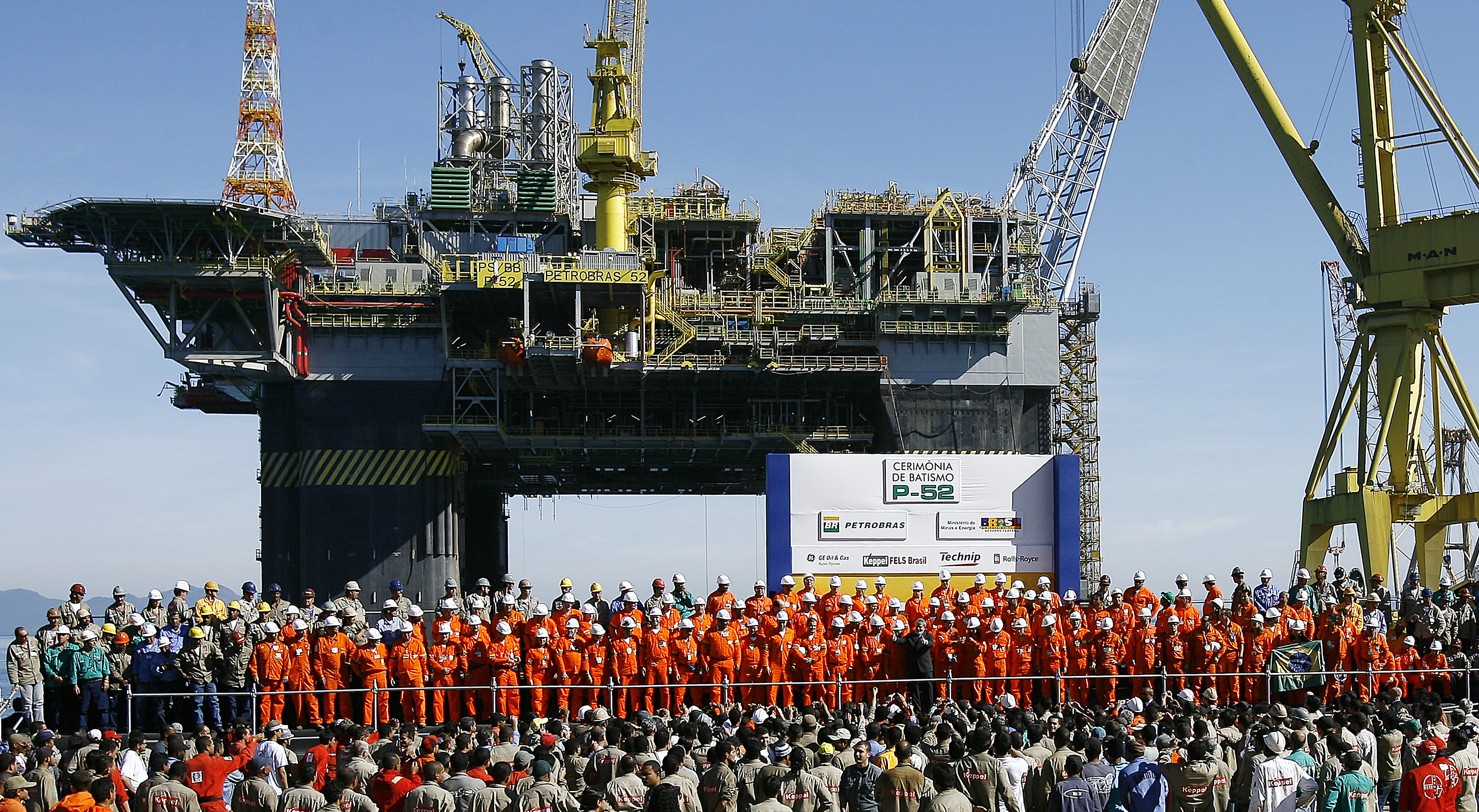
Launch ceremony for oil platform P-52, which operates in the Campos Basin

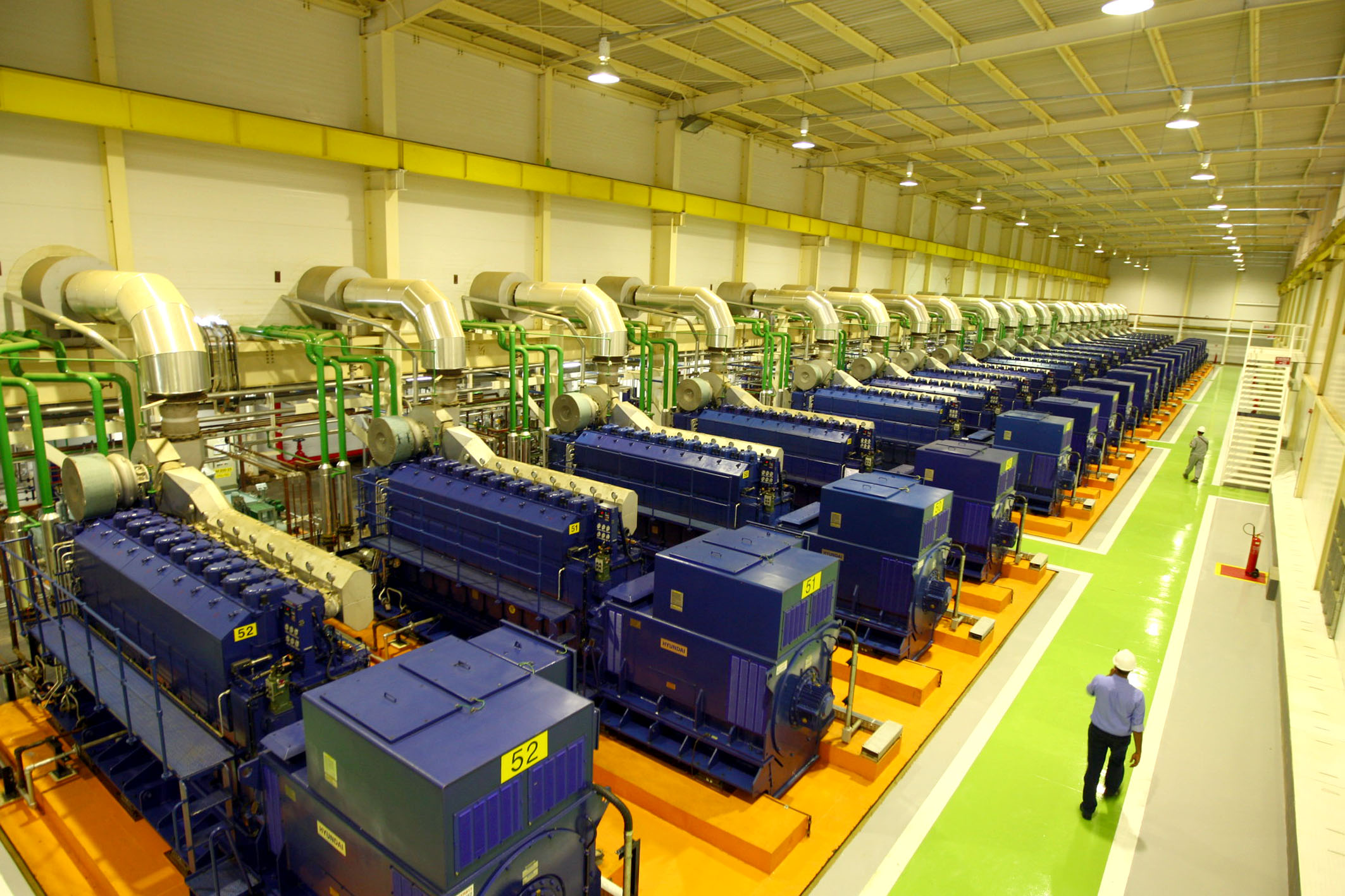
Oil-based Arembepe thermal power plant in Camaçari, Bahia

Brazil is the world's 8th-largest oil producer. Up to 1997, the government-owned Petróleo Brasileiro S.A. (Petrobras) had a monopoly on oil. More than 50 oil companies were engaged in oil exploration by 2006. The only global oil producer is Petrobras, with an output of more than 2 million barrels (320,000 m^{3}) of oil equivalent per day. It is also a major distributor of oil products, and owns oil refineries and oil tankers.

In 2006, Brazil had 11.2 billion barrels (1.78×10^{9} m^{3}) the second-largest proven oil reserves in South America after Venezuela. The vast majority of proven reserves were located in the Campos and Santos offshore basins off the southeast coast of Brazil. In November 2007, Petrobras announced that it believed the offshore Tupi oil field had between 5 and 8 billion barrels (1.3×10^{9} m^{3}) of recoverable light oil and neighbouring fields may even contain more, which all in all could result in Brazil becoming one of the largest producers of oil in the world.

Brazil has been a net exporter of oil since 2011. However, the country still imports some light oil from the Middle East, because several refineries, built in the 1960s and 1970s under the military government, are not suited to process the heavy oil in Brazilian reserves, discovered decades later.

Transpetro, a wholly owned subsidiary of Petrobras, operates a crude oil transport network. The system consists of 6,000 kilometres (3,700 mi) of crude oil pipelines, coastal import terminals, and inland storage facilities.

In 2022, Brazil ranked second in Central and South America for crude oil reserves, with approximately 13.24 billion barrels, behind Venezuela.

==== Oil shale ====
Brazil has the world's second largest known oil shale (the Irati shale and lacustrine deposits) resources and has second largest shale oil production after Estonia. Oil shale resources lie in São Mateus do Sul, Paraná, and in Vale do Paraíba. Brazil has developed the world's largest surface oil shale pyrolysis retort Petrosix, operated by Petrobras. Production in 1999 was about 200,000 tonnes.

=== Natural gas ===
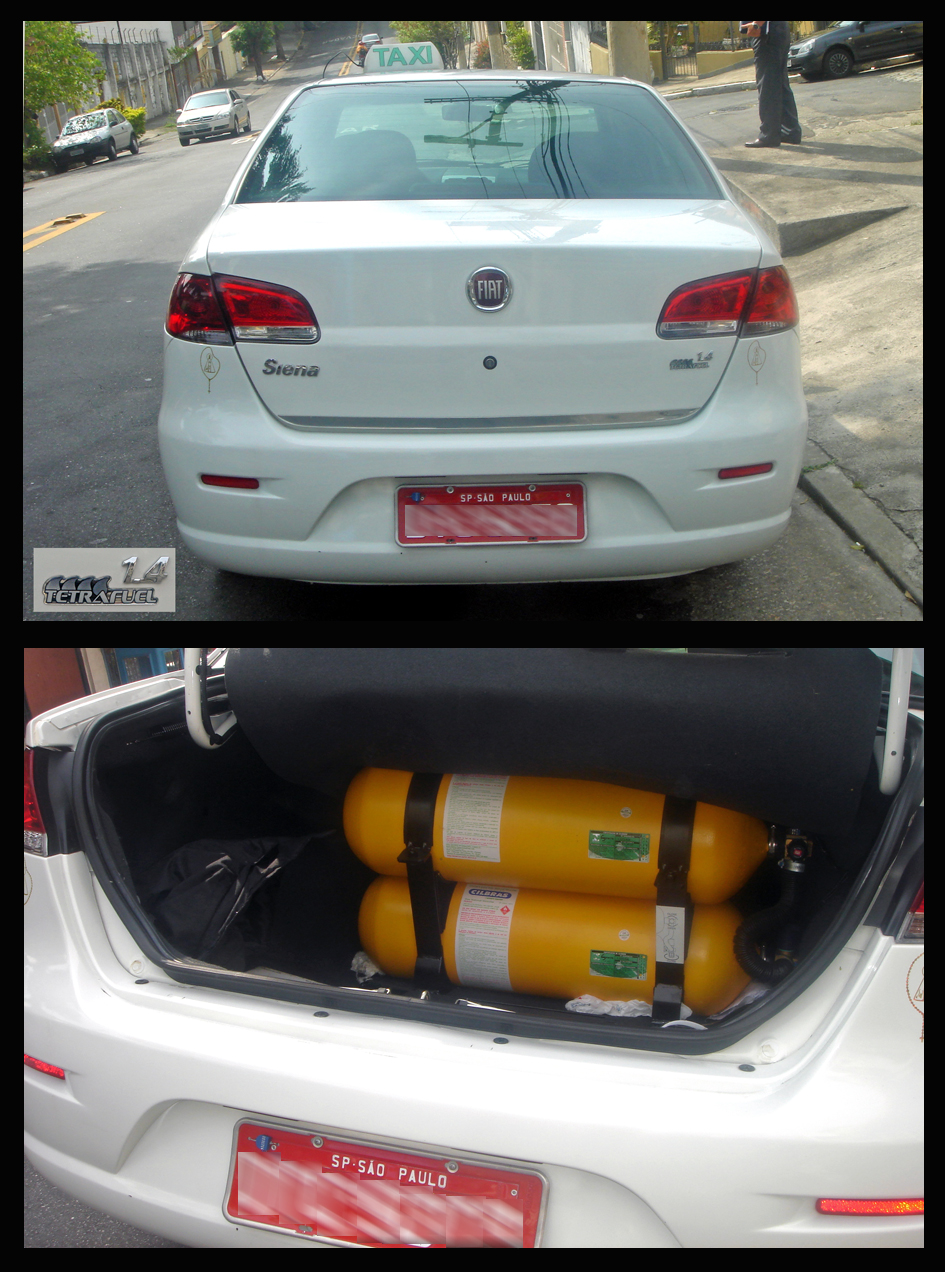
Cars fueled by natural gas, such as this Fiat Siena, are common in Brazil.

As of January 2023, Brazil possesses natural gas reserves totaling approximately 13.4 trillion cubic feet (Tcf), placing it fourth among Central and South American nations. These reserves primarily consist of associated gas from oil fields, notably within the pre-salt reserves. Approximately 76% of these reserves are located offshore in the Santos Basin, with the remaining 24% situated onshore, primarily in the Solimões Basin and Paranaíba Basin.

At the end of 2017, the proven reserves of Brazil's natural gas were 369 × 10^{9} m^{3}, with possible reserves expected to be 2 times higher. Petrobras controls over 90 percent of Brazil's natural gas reserves.

Brazil's inland gas pipeline systems are operated by Petrobras subsidiary Transpetro. In 2005, construction began on the Gas Unificação (Gasun pipeline) which will link Mato Grosso do Sul in southwest Brazil, to Maranhão in the northeast. China's Sinopec is a contractor for the Gasene pipeline, which will link the northeast and southeast networks. Petrobras is also constructing the Urucu-Manaus pipeline, which will link the Urucu gas reserves to power plants in the state of Amazonas. In 2015 the sale of 255 parcels for fracking was opposed with protest actions during and at the auction.

In 2005, the gas production was 18.7 × 10^{9} m^{3}, which is less than the natural gas consumption of Brazil. Gas imports come mainly from Bolivia's Rio Grande basin through the Bolivia-Brazil gas pipeline (Gasbol pipeline), from Argentina through the Transportadora de Gas de Mercosur pipeline (Paraná-Uruguaiana pipeline), and from LNG imports. Brazil has held talks with Venezuela and Argentina about building a new pipeline system Gran Gasoducto del Sur linking the three countries; however, the plan has not moved beyond the planning stages.

=== Coal ===
In 2004, Brazil had total coal reserves of about 30 billion tonnes, but the deposits vary by the quality and quantity. The proved recoverable reserves were approximately 10 billion tonnes. In 2004 Brazil produced 5.4 million tonnes of coal, while coal consumption reached 21.9 million tonnes. Almost all of Brazil's coal output is steam coal, of which about 85% is fired in power stations. Reserves of sub-bituminous coal are located mostly in the states of Rio Grande do Sul, Santa Catarina and Paraná.

=== Nuclear ===
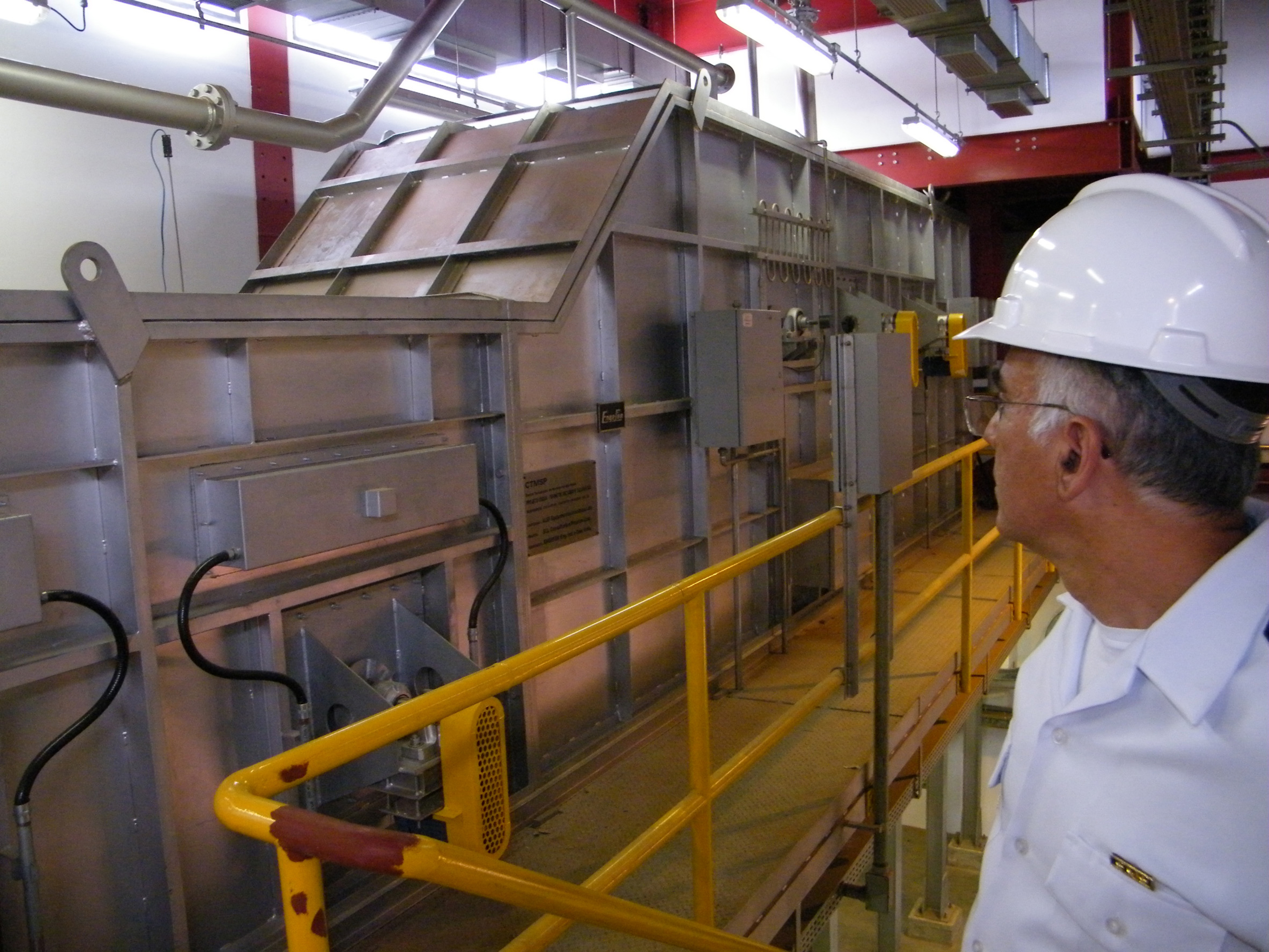
Machinery for the extraction of uranium hexafluoride in a military facility at Iperó, built with Brazilian technology

Brazil has the 6th largest uranium reserves in the world. Deposits of uranium are found in eight different states of Brazil. Proven reserves are 162,000 tonnes. Cumulative production at the end of 2002 was less than 1,400 tonnes. The Poços de Caldas production centre in Minas Gerais state was shut down in 1997 and was replaced by a new plant at Lagoa Real in Bahia.

== Electricity ==
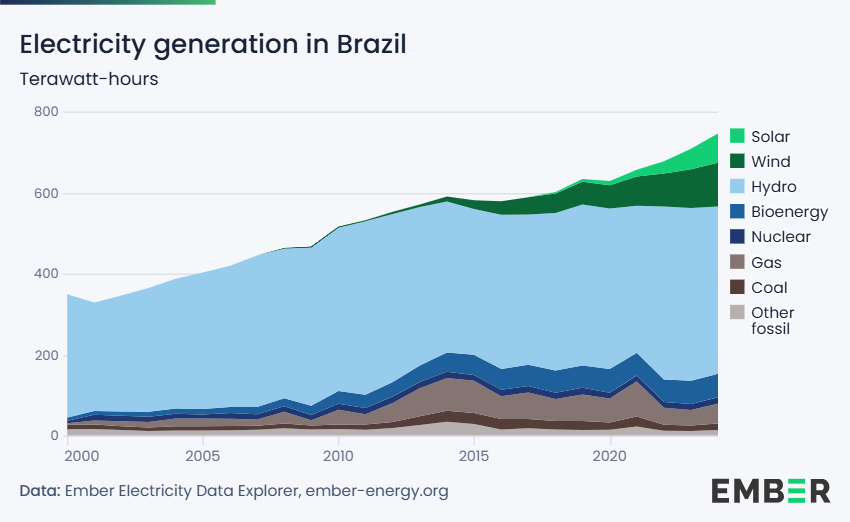
Electricity generation in Brazil per source in terawatt-hours

Power sector reforms were launched in the mid-1990s and a new regulatory framework was applied in 2004. In 2004, Brazil had 86.5 GW of installed generating capacity and it produced 387 Twh of electricity. As of today 66% of distribution and 28% of power generation is owned by private companies. In 2004, 59 companies operated in power generation and 64 in electricity distribution.

The major power company is Centrais Elétricas Brasileiras (Eletrobrás), which together with its subsidiaries generates and transmits approximately 60% of Brazil's electric supply. The largest private-owned power company is Tractebel Energia. An independent system operator (Operador Nacional do Sistema Elétrico - ((ONS)), responsible for the technical coordination of electricity dispatching and the management of transmission services, and a wholesale market were created in 1998.

During the electricity crisis in 2001, the government launched a program to build 55 gas-fired power stations with a total capacity of 22 GW, but only 19 power stations were built, with a total capacity of 4,012 MW.

In 2021, Brazil was the world's sixth-largest electricity producer, generating 663 terawatt-hours (TWh), which represented 2% of global electricity generation. From 2011 to 2021, Brazil's electricity generation increased at an average annual rate of 2.4%, driven by growth in solar power (199%), wind power (40%), and fossil fuels (13%). In 2021, the most important sources of electricity generation were hydropower, contributing 55% of total electricity, followed by natural gas with 15%, and wind with 11%. The principal consumers of electricity were the industrial sector (39%), residential areas (29%), and commercial and public services (25%).

=== Hydropower ===
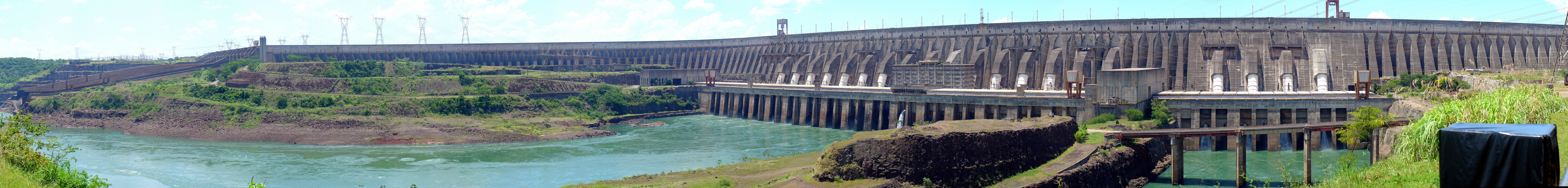
Itaipu Dam, the world's largest hydroelectric dam by generating capacity

In 2006, Brazil was the third largest hydroelectricity producer in the world after China and Canada. The gross theoretical capability exceeds 3,000 TWh per annum, of which 800 TWh per annum is economically exploitable. In 2004, Brazil produced 321TWh of hydropower. In 2019, Brazil had 217 hydroelectric plants in operation, with an installed capacity of 98,581 MW, 60.16% of the country's energy generation. At the end of 2021 Brazil was the 2nd country in the world in terms of installed hydroelectric power (109.4 GW).

In total electricity generation, in 2019 Brazil reached 170,000 megawatts of installed capacity, more than 75% from renewable sources (the majority, hydroelectric plants).

In 2013, the Southeast used about 50% of the load of the National Integrated System (SIN), being the main energy consuming region in the country. The region's installed electricity generation capacity totaled almost 42,500 MW, which represented about a third of Brazil's generation capacity. The hydroelectric generation represented 58% of the installed capacity in the region, with the remaining 42% basically corresponding to the thermoelectric generation. São Paulo accounted for 40% of this capacity; Minas Gerais by about 25%; Rio de Janeiro by 13.3%; and Espírito Santo for the rest.

The South Region has the Itaipu Dam, which was the largest hydroelectric plant in the world for several years, until the inauguration of the Three Gorges Dam in China. Remains the world's second largest operational hydroelectric power plant. Brazil co-owns the Itaipu Dam with Paraguay: the dam is on the Paraná River, located on the border between the countries. It has an installed generation capacity of 14 GW by 20 generating units of 700 MW each.

Northern Brazil has large hydroelectric plants such as Belo Monte and Tucuruí, which produce much of the national energy.

Brazil's hydroelectric potential has not yet been fully explored, so the country still has the capacity to build several renewable energy plants in its territory.

=== Wind energy ===
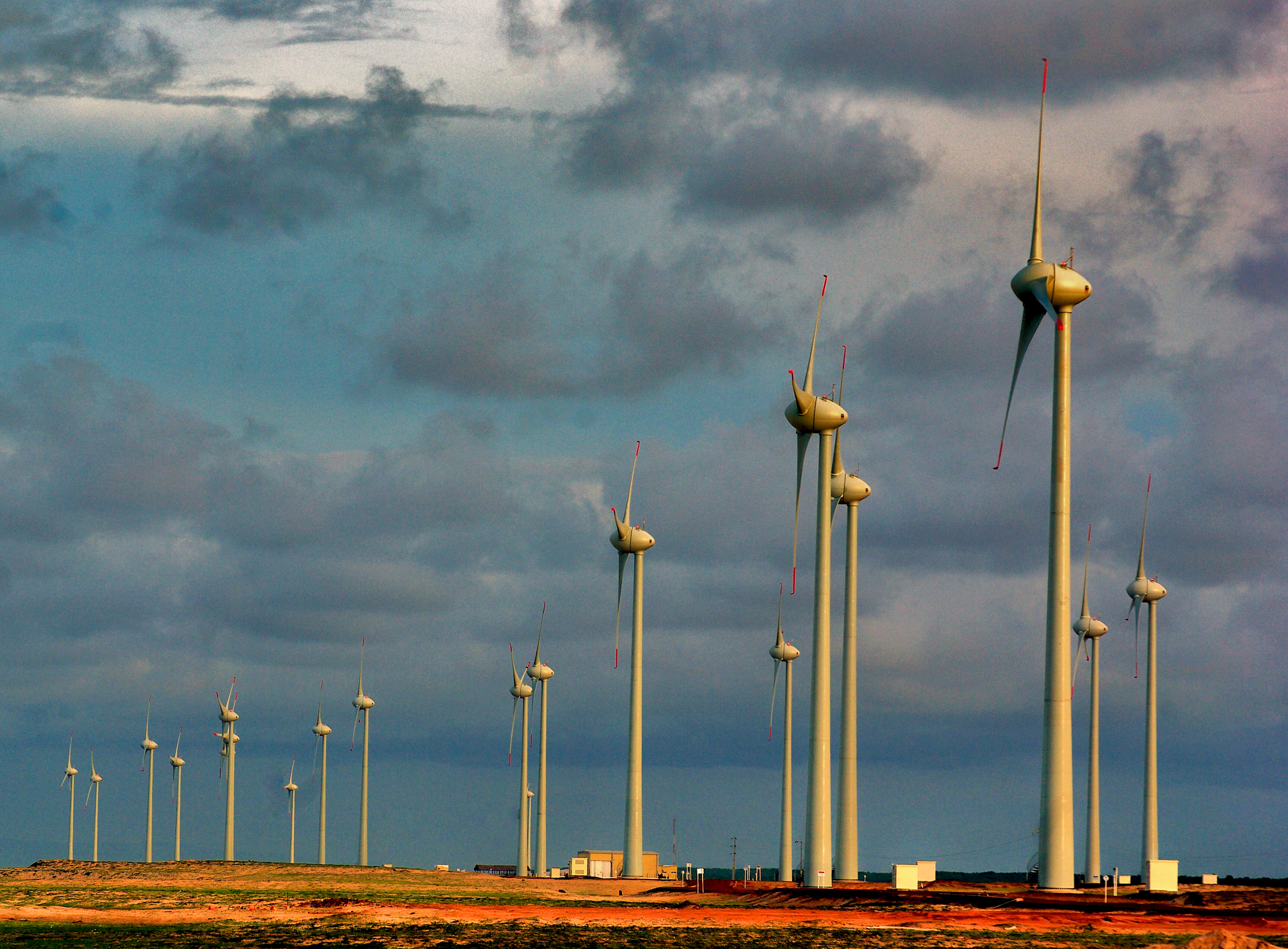
Wind farm in Parnaíba, Piauí

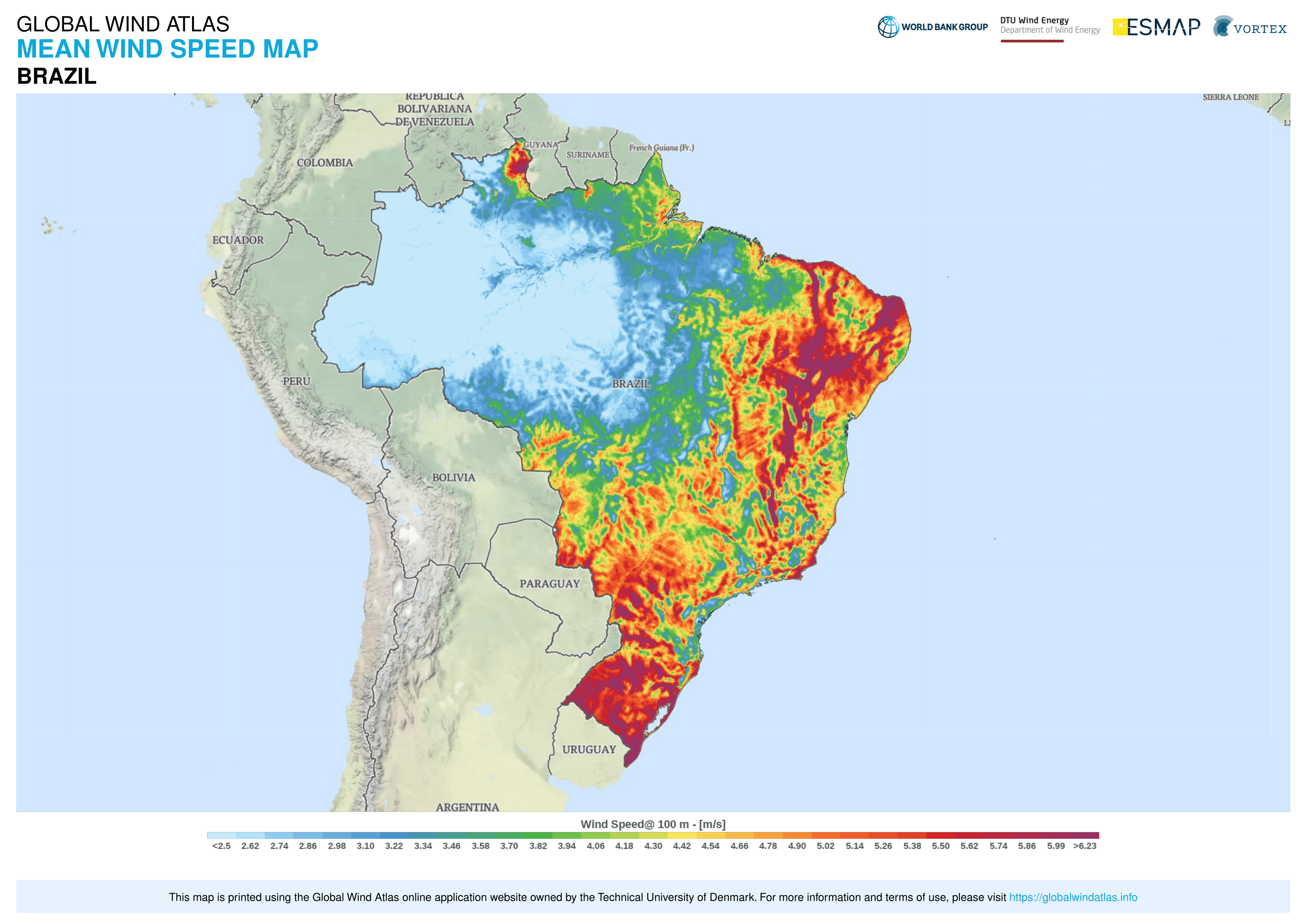
Mean wind speed in Brazil

In July 2022 Brazil reached 22 GW of installed wind power. In 2021 Brazil was the 7th country in the world in terms of installed wind power (21 GW), and the 4th largest producer of wind energy in the world (72 TWh), behind only China, USA and Germany.

Brazil's gross wind resource potential was estimated, in 2019, to be about 522 GW (this, only onshore), enough energy to meet three times the country's current demand. As of August 2021, according to ONS, total installed capacity was 18.9 GW, with average capacity factor of 58%. While the world average wind production capacity factors is 24.7%, there are areas in Northern Brazil, specially in Bahia State, where some wind farms record with average capacity factors over 60%; the average capacity factor in the Northeast Region is 45% in the coast and 49% in the interior. In 2019, wind energy represented 9% of the energy generated in the country. In 2020 Brazil was the 8th country in the world in terms of installed wind power (17.2 GW); in November 2021 Brazil reached 20 GW of installed wind power.

=== Solar power ===
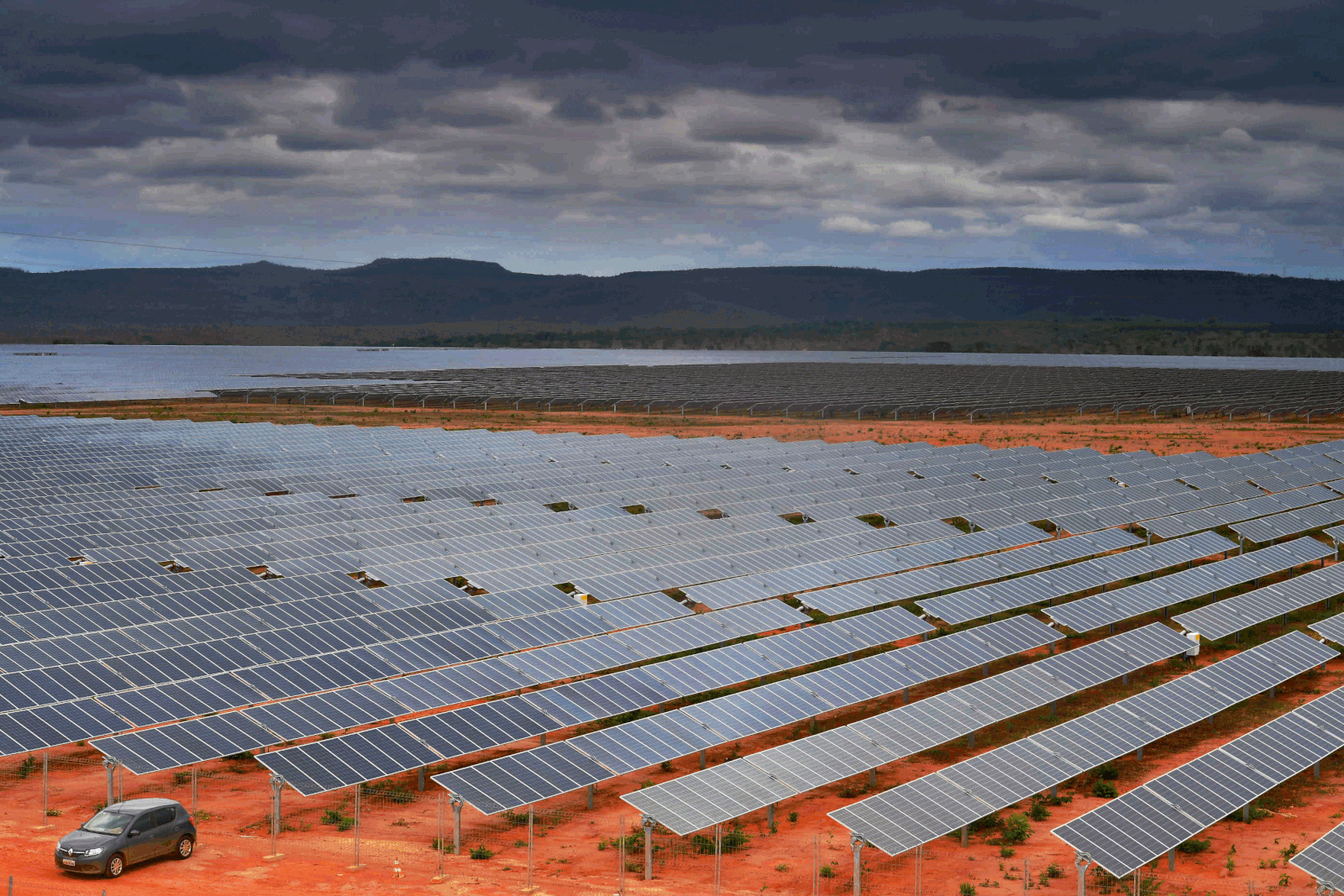
Pirapora Solar Complex, one of the largest in Latin America, with a capacity of 321 MW

In October 2022 Brazil reached 21 GW of installed solar power. In 2021, Brazil was the 14th country in the world in terms of installed solar power (13 GW), and the 11th largest producer of solar energy in the world (16.8 TWh).

As of August 2021, according to ONS, total installed capacity of photovoltaic solar was 10.5 GW, with average capacity factor of 21%. Some of the most irradiated Brazilian States are MG ("Minas Gerais"), BA ("Bahia") and GO (Goiás), which have indeed world irradiation level records. In 2019, solar power represented 1,27% of the energy generated in the country. In 2020, Brazil was the 14th country in the world in terms of installed solar power (7.8 GW).

=== Nuclear energy ===
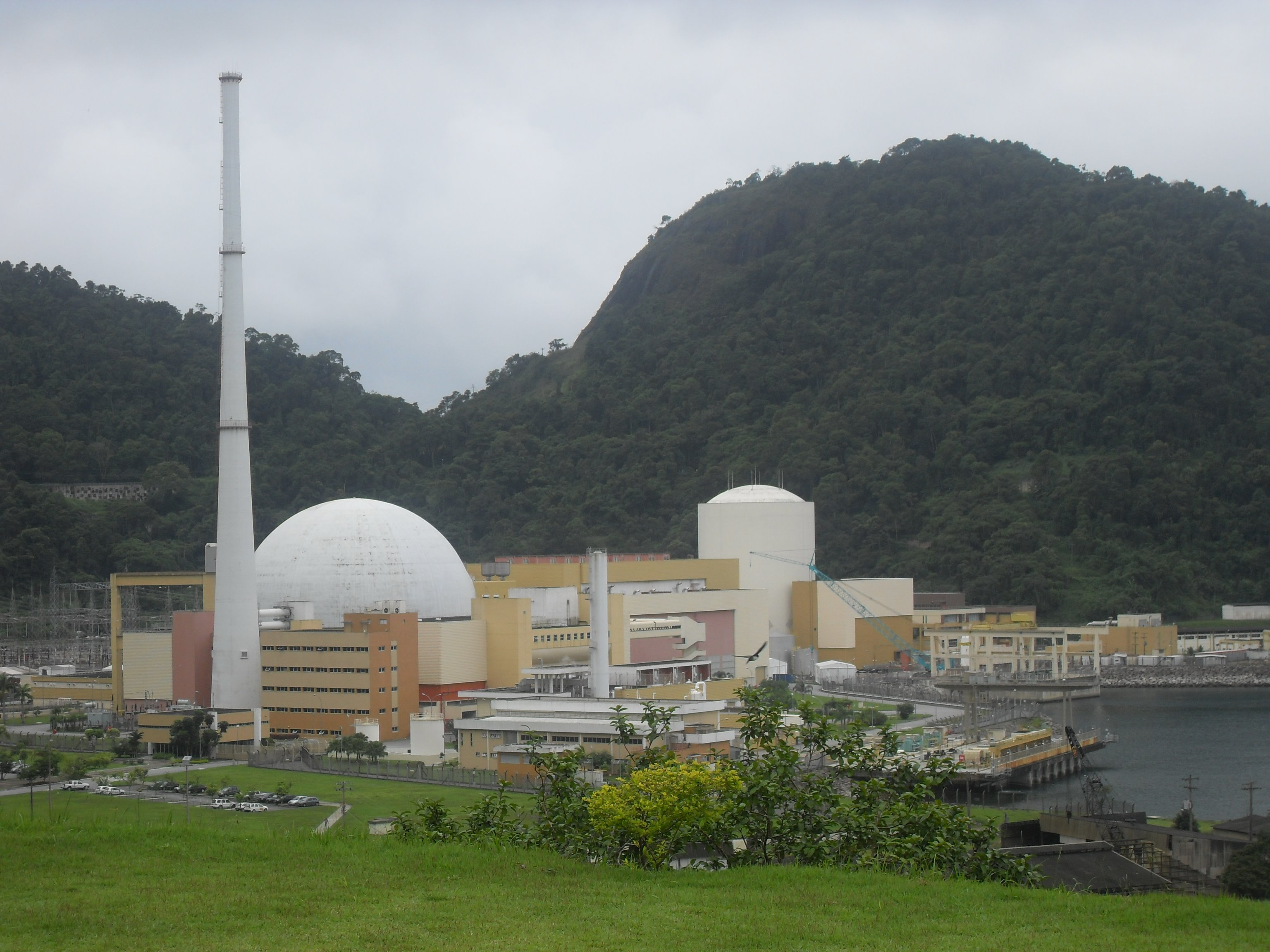
Angra Nuclear Power Plant in Angra dos Reis, Rio de Janeiro

In 2021, nuclear energy represented about 2.2% of Brazil's electricity generation. Brazil led Central and South America in nuclear electricity generation that year, producing 15 billion kWh. Operated by Eletrobras, Angra 1 and Angra 2 contribute to Brazil’s electricity generation with a combined installed capacity of about 2 GW. Construction of Angra 3, Brazil's third nuclear power plant, is progressing, with an anticipated start of operations in 2028 with an installed capacity of approximately 1.4 GW.

Brazil signed a nuclear cooperation agreement with Argentina since 1991.

== Biofuels ==
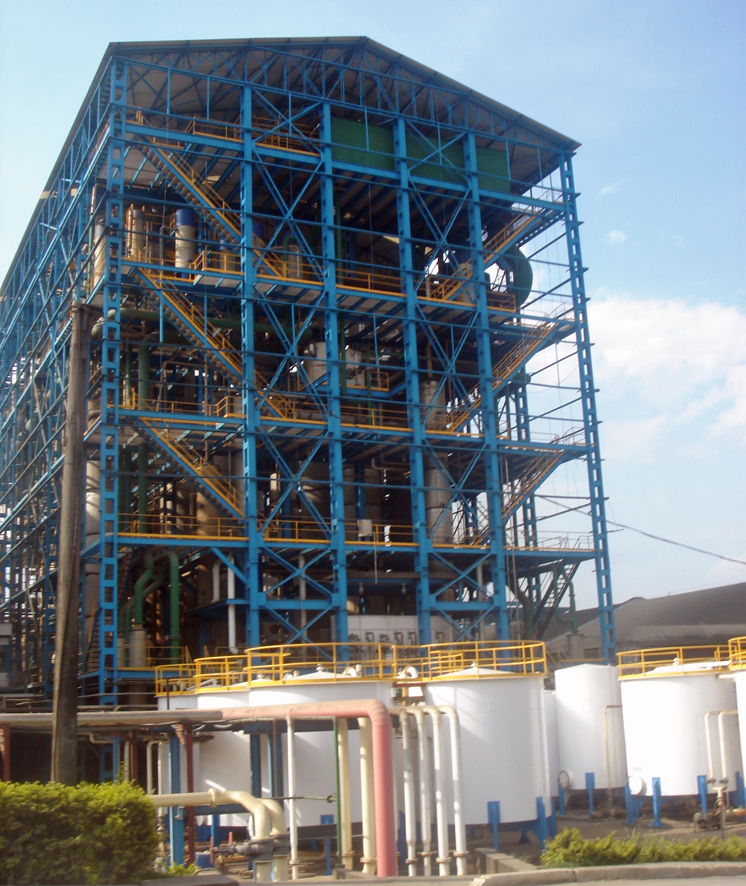
Ethanol distillery in Piracicaba, São Paulo

In 2021, Brazil was the world's second-largest biofuel producer, accounting for 20% of global production, after the United States. From 2011 to 2021, Brazil's average annual biofuel production and consumption grew by 3% and 4%, respectively. Due to the seasonal nature of biofuel production, Brazil imports biofuels during off-peak periods to satisfy demand. In 2021, the country consumed 569,000 barrels per day, with bioethanol constituting 79% and biodiesel 21%.

In 2020, Brazil reached an installed capacity of 15.2 gigawatts (GW) for energy production derived from solid biofuels and renewable waste.

Due to its ethanol fuel production, Brazil has sometimes been described as a bio-energy superpower. Ethanol fuel is produced from sugar cane. Brazil has the largest sugar cane crop in the world, and is the largest exporter of ethanol in the world. With the 1973 oil crisis, the Brazilian government initiated in 1975 the Pró-Álcool program. The Pró-Álcool or Programa Nacional do Álcool (National Alcohol Program) was a nationwide program financed by the government to phase out all automobile fuels derived from fossil fuels in favour of ethanol. The program successfully reduced by 10 million the number of cars running on gasoline in Brazil, thereby reducing the country's dependence on oil imports.

The production and consumption of biodiesel is expected to reach to 2% of diesel fuel in 2008 and 5% in 2013.

Brazil's peat reserves are estimated at 25 billion tonnes, the highest in South America. However, no production of peat for fuel has yet been developed. Brazil produces 65 million tonnes of fuelwood per year. The annual production of charcoal is about 6 million tonnes, used in the steel industry. The cogeneration potential of agricultural and livestock residues varies from 4 GW to 47 GW by 2025.
