= Bolivia–Argentina pipeline =

Bolivia–Argentina pipeline may refer to:

- Yabog pipeline
- Gasoducto Noreste Argentino
