= Porto Urucu Airport =

Porto Urucu Airport Aeroporto de Porto Urucu
- IATA: RPU; ICAO: SBUY; LID: AM0025

Summary
- Airport type: Private
- Owner/Operator: Petrobras
- Serves: Porto Urucu (Coari)
- Time zone: BRT−1 (UTC−04:00)
- Elevation AMSL: 64 m / 210 ft
- Coordinates: 04°52′59″S 065°21′21″W

Map
- Location in Brazil

Runways
Direction	Length		Surface
Direction	m	ft	Surface
09/27	1,320	4,331	Asphalt
- Sources: ANAC, DECEA

Porto Urucu Airport (IATA: RPU, ICAO: SBUY) is the airport serving the district of Porto Urucu in Coari, Brazil.

It is operated by Petrobras.

== History ==
The airport was built as a support facility to the Urucu oil and natural gas province and the Urucu–Manaus pipeline.

== Airlines and destinations ==
Airlines	Destinations
Azul Brazilian Airlines	Charter: Carauari, Manaus

== Access ==
The airport is located 4 km (2 mi) from downtown Porto Urucu and 470 km (292 mi) from downtown Coari.

== See also ==
- List of airports in Brazil
