= Gasoducto del Noreste Argentino =

Location
- Country: Bolivia, Argentina
- Start: Bolivia
- Passes through: Campo Durán, Sáenz Peña, Vera
- To: Santa Fe, Argentina

General information
- Type: Natural Gas
- Owner: Enarsa
- Contractors: Techint
- Expected: 2010

Technical information
- Length: 1,465 km (910 mi)
- Maximum discharge: 10 billion cubic meter
- Diameter: 30 in (762 mm)

Gasoducto del Noreste Argentino (also known as the Argentine Northwest Gas Pipeline and GNEA pipeline) is a proposed 1,465 kilometres (910 mi) long natural gas pipeline to transport natural gas from Bolivia to Argentina.

== History ==
The pipeline project was announced in 2003. The agreement between Bolivia and Argentina to build the pipeline was signed on 26 March 2007.

== Technical features ==
The length of the pipeline is 1,465 kilometres (910 mi) and the capacity will be 10 billion cubic meter (bcm) of natural gas per annum.

== Construction ==
The pipeline would be built by Techint. The construction is expected to start in July 2008. Pipes for the pipeline would be provided by Siat or Tubacero. The pipeline is expected to be commissioned by January 2010 and it is expected to cost US$1.8 billion.

== See also ==
- Cruz del Sur pipeline
- GasAndes Pipeline
- Paraná–Uruguaiana pipeline
- Yabog pipeline
