= Gran Gasoducto del Sur =

Proposed gas pipeline in South America

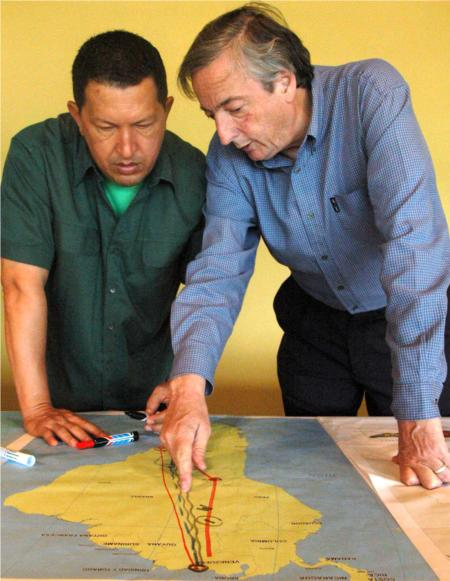
- Late Venezuelan President Hugo Chávez and late Argentine president Néstor Kirchner discuss the Gran Gasoducto del Sur—an energy and trade integration project for South America. They met on November 21, 2005, in Venezuela

Location
- Country: Venezuela, Brazil, Argentina
- Direction: north–south
- Start: Puerto Ordaz, Venezuela

General information
- Type: natural gas

The Gran Gasoducto del Sur (also known as Venezuela-Argentina Gas Line) was a proposed 8,000–15,000-kilometer (5,000–9,300 mi) long natural gas pipeline to connect Venezuela, Brazil and Argentina. The overall project cost was expected to be around US$17-23 billion.

== History ==
On 9 December 2005, during an annual meeting of Mercosur in Montevideo, the presidents of Venezuela, Argentina, and Brazil signed an accord for the construction of the pipeline.

In June 2007 Petrobras president Jose Sergio Gabrielli said that the pipeline would not become operational for 20 to 30 years. In July 2007 Venezuelan President Hugo Chávez said that interest in building the pipeline had cooled.

== Route ==
The exact route of the pipeline was never defined. It was only disclosed that the first 2,950 kilometres (1,830 mi) section was to run from Puerto Ordaz, Venezuela, through Rondônia, Amazonas and Amapá states in Brazil to Marabá, Pará state Brazil. In Manaus, Amazonas State, the pipeline was to be connected to the Urucu–Manaus pipeline and the Urucu-Porto Velho pipeline. From Marabá, a 1,387 kilometres (862 mi) branch line to Fortaleza, Ceará State was foreseen. In Fortaleza the pipeline can be connected to the existing system that extends along the coast to Salvador, Bahia State to be connected with the GASENE pipeline.

The second 1,977 kilometres (1,228 mi) long section from Marabá was to continue southward to São Paulo State. From there, the pipeline was to be routed by the 1,875 kilometres (1,165 mi) section to the border between Rio Grande do Sul State and Uruguay and then cross Uruguay to Argentina.

== Technical features ==
The Puerto Ordaz-Marabá section was planned to have a 66-inch (1,700 mm) diameter and to have 13 compressor stations of 25,000 hp each. The diameter of the Marabá-Fortaleza branch as planned would gradually decrease from 36 inches (910 mm) to 32 inches (810 mm) and the branch project involves the installation of five 15,000 hp compression stations. The gas amount received in Fortaleza was planned to be 12.75 billion cubic meter (bcm) of natural gas per annum. The Marabá-São Paulo section was to be 54 inches (1,370 mm) in diameter and to include eight 20,000 hp compression stations. The gas delivered to São Paulo was planned to be 15 bcm per annum. The Brazil-Argentina section with capacity of 18 bcm per annum was to include eight 15,000 hp compressor stations.

== Financing ==
The project was to be financed by Petróleos de Venezuela S.A., CAF – Development Bank of Latin America and the Caribbean, and Caixa Econômica Federal with possible participation of other public institutions and private investors.
