= GASUN =

GASUN Gas Unificação

Location
- Country: Brazil
- State: Mato Grosso do Sul, Goiás, Pará, Tocantins, Maranhão, Piauí
- Start: Mimoso, Mato Grosso do Sul
- Passes through: Goiânia, Palmas, Belém
- To: Maranhão

General information
- Type: natural gas
- Operator: Petrobras
- Expected: 2026

Technical information
- Length: 5,000 km (3,100 mi)

The National Unification Gas Pipeline (Gas Unificação – GASUN) will be a 5,000-kilometre (3,100 mi) natural gas pipeline in Brazil. GASUN will connect the Gasbol pipeline with the northern Amazon and the Northeast states (Pará, Tocantins, Maranhão and Piauí) allowing transportation of Bolivian gas into these regions. The project is expected to cost US$2.48 billion.

The first stage of GASUN will begin in Mimoso, Mato Grosso do Sul, and will join the Gasbol pipeline. From there it will run towards Brasília, passing through Goiânia. Construction of this section started in 2005, and scheduled to be completed in 2007.

The longest and most costly portion of GASUN will be the 2,260 kilometres (1,400 mi) long central-north branch, which is to connect Goiás and Maranhão. It will pass through Palmas and Belém, Pará. The entire natural gas pipeline should be complete by 2026.
