= List of regulatory organizations of Brazil =

This is a list of organs of the federal government of Brazil that intend to regulate markets:

- Brazilian Electricity Regulatory Agency
- Administrative Council for Economic Defense
- National Health Surveillance Agency
- Brazilian Agency of Telecommunications
- National Agency of Petroleum, Natural Gas and Biofuels
- National Institute of Metrology Standardization and Industrial Quality
- Securities and Exchange Commission (Brazil)
