= GasAndes Pipeline =

Natural gas pipeline in South America

GasAndes pipeline

Location
- Country: Argentina, Chile
- Direction: east-west
- Start: La Mora, Mendoza Province
- To: San Bernardo on the outskirts of Santiago.

General information
- Type: natural gas
- Partners: NOVA Corporation, Gasco, Gener, Compañía General de Combustibles, Techint Compañía Ténica Internacional
- Commissioned: 1997

Technical information
- Maximum discharge: 3.3 billion cubic meter per year

The GasAndes Pipeline is a 463-kilometre (288 mi) long natural gas pipeline from La Mora, Mendoza in Argentina to San Bernardo on the outskirts of Santiago, Chile.

== History ==
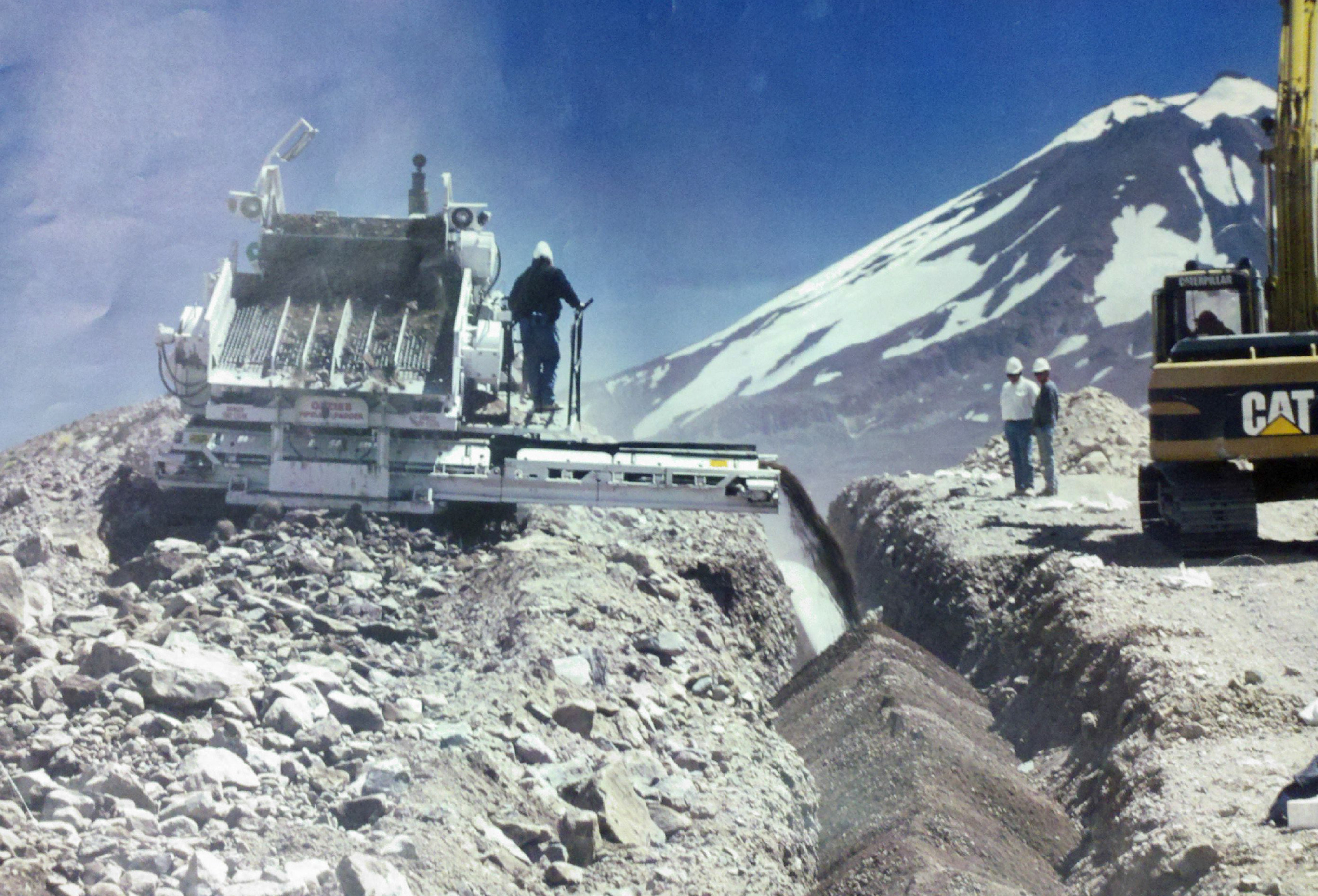
Construction of the GasAndes pipeline. A backfill separation machine is used in the rocky terrain to make padding for the pipe trench.

In 1991, Argentina and Chile concluded the Gas Interconnection Protocol. For the implementation of this protocol several pipeline projects were proposed. The GasAndes Pipeline project was proposed by the consortium of NOVA Corporation of Canada, Chilean companies Gasco and Gener, and Argentine companies Compañía General de Combustibles and Techint Compañía Ténica Internacional. The feasibility study of the pipeline was concluded in 1994. The pipeline was commissioned in 1997. Luc Poyer was the general manager of the company from 2001 to 2023: under his leadership the pipeline was extended to supply El Teniente Codelco CoperMine.

== Technical features ==
The diameter of the pipeline is 610 millimetres (24 in) and the annual capacity is 3.3 billion cubic meter. It is supplied mainly from the Neuquén gas fields. Total investments of the project was US$1.46 billion.

== See also ==
- Gasoducto del Noreste Argentino
- Cruz del Sur pipeline
- Yabog pipeline
- Paraná–Uruguaiana pipeline
