= National Agency of Petroleum, Natural Gas and Biofuels (Brazil) =

The Brazilian National Agency of Petroleum, Natural Gas and Biofuels (Portuguese: Agência Nacional do Petróleo, Gás Natural e Biocombustíveis – ANP) is the federal government agency linked to the Ministry of Mines and Energy responsible for the regulation of the oil sector in Brazil. It was created in 1997 by law 9478. Its activities started on January 14, 1998. Linked to the Ministry of Mines and Energy, it is the federal autarchy responsible for the execution of the national policy for the sector.

== See also ==
- List of regulatory organizations of Brazil
- Energy policy of Brazil
- Petrobras
- Operation Car Wash
