= Administrative Council for Economic Defense =

Brazilian government agency

- Conselho Administrativo de Defesa Econômica
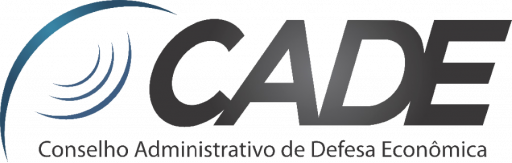

Agency overview
- Formed: 10 September 1962; 64 years ago
- Jurisdiction: Federal government of Brazil
- Headquarters: SEPN 515, Conjunto D, Lote 4 Brasília, Federal District
- Annual budget: R$ 47 million (2023)
- Agency executive: Alexandre Cordeiro Macedo, Chairperson
- Parent department: Ministry of Justice and Public Security
- Website: www.gov.br/cade/

The Administrative Council for Economic Defense (in Portuguese, Conselho Administrativo de Defesa Econômica, often referred to as Cade or CADE) is Brazil's national competition regulator and an agency of the government of Brazil. Its stated goals are "guiding, inspecting, preventing and investigating economic power abuse by exercising a custodial role in its prevention and repression".

== History ==
On 10 September 1962 CADE was created as an organ of the Ministry of Labor during the government of President João Goulart by its Federal Law No. 4,137. From its creation until 1991, it remained largely inactive being used as an instrument of the State.

The Federal Law No. 8,884 of 11 June 1994 revoked the Federal Law No. 4,137 and transformed CADE into a federal agency linked to the Ministry of Justice.

In November 2011, its Federal Law No. 12,529 was approved, entering into force in May 2012. This law made numerous changes in the autarchy, especially from an organizational and procedural perspective.

== Structure ==
CADE's main bodies are the Administrative Court (TADE), the General Superintendence (SG) and the Department of Economic Studies (DEE). TADE has the role of judging competition matters, playing preventive, repressive and educational roles within the Brazilian market. The SG mainly plays the role of instructing the processes in the control of conducts and concentrations and of monitoring the market. The DEE prepares economic studies in order to assist TADE and the SG.

Similar institutions with equivalent functions to those of CADE are the Federal Trade Commission (FTC) in the United States of America, the Office of Fair Trading (OFT) in the United Kingdom, the Italian Competition Authority, the Australian Competition & Consumer Commission (ACCC) in Australia.

== See also ==
- List of regulatory organs of Brazil
- List of former presidents of Cade
