= Cruz del Sur pipeline =

Cruz del Sur

Location
- Country: Argentina, Uruguay
- Direction: West–East
- Start: Buenos Aires, Argentina
- Passes through: Punta Lara, River Plate, Colonia, San José, Canelones
- To: Montevideo, Uruguay

General information
- Type: Natural gas
- Partners: BG Group, Pan American Energy, ANCAP, Wintershall Dea
- Operator: Gasoducto Cruz del Sur S.A.
- Commissioned: 2002

Technical information
- Length: 208 km (129 mi)
- Maximum discharge: 1.8 billion cubic meters per year

Cruz del Sur pipeline is a natural gas pipeline linking Buenos Aires in Argentina with Colonia del Sacramento and Montevideo in Uruguay.

== History ==
Construction of the pipeline started in March 2001. The pipeline was completed in November 2002 and it was inaugurated by the presidents of Uruguay and Argentina, Jorge Batlle Ibáñez and Eduardo Duhalde on 29 November 2002 in Montevideo.

== Technical description ==
The pipeline is 215-kilometre (134 mi) long and it has capacity of 1.8 billion cubic meters of natural gas per year. It cost US$150 millions.

The offshore section between Punta Lara (Argentina) and Santa Ana (Uruguay) across of the River Plate, is 57-kilometre (35 mi) long. It has a diameter of 24 inches (610 mm) and a maximum pressure of 95 bars (9,500 kPa). The Uruguayan section is 145-kilometre (90 mi) long and has a maximum pressure of 80 bars (8,000 kPa).

The pipeline is supplied from the gas fields in the Neuquén Basin.

== Operator ==
It operated by Gasoducto Cruz del Sur S.A. and owned by consortium of BG Group (40%), Pan American Energy (30%), ANCAP (20%) and Wintershall Dea (10%).

== Proposed expansion ==
There is a proposal to prolong the pipeline to southern Brazil. The spur line would start in Colonia, Uruguay, and end in Porto Alegre, Brazil. 415 kilometres (258 mi) would be laid in Uruguay and 505 kilometres (314 mi) in Brazil. In Rio Grande do Sul, it would be linked with the GASBOL pipeline.

== See also ==
- GasAndes Pipeline
- Paraná–Uruguaiana pipeline
- Yabog pipeline
