= Urucu Oil Province =

Brazilian oil and natural gas field

Urucu Oil Province in Amazonas, Brazil.

The Urucu Oil Province (Portuguese: Provincia Petroleira de Urucu) is a Brazilian oil and natural gas field located in the municipality of Coari, in the interior of the state of Amazonas. It is the largest proven onshore oil and natural gas reserve in Brazil, according to Petrobras.

== History ==
The Urucu field was discovered on October 12, 1986, by Petrobras, although searches for oil in the Amazon date back to 1917. It is the first commercially viable reserve discovered in the Amazon region.

== Extraction and logistics ==
The Amazon region, and in particular the Solimões Basin, is the largest onshore natural gas basin and the fourth largest oil basin in Brazil in terms of reserves and production. The state of Amazonas, which includes the Solimões Basin and the Amazonas Basin, concentrates 80% of Brazil's proven onshore gas reserves and 12% of proven onshore oil reserves. Today, the Solimões Basin produces an average of 40,000 barrels per day of oil and 11 million cubic meters per day of gas. The oil is of excellent quality, very light. The gas is quite wet, that is, it contains a high proportion of condensate and liquified petroleum gas (LPG).

Despite the logistical difficulty in the Amazon, the cost of extracting oil and natural gas from Urucu is among the lowest in Brazil. According to Petrobras, the oil province is profitable and important for the development of the local economy.

Urucu has a set of pipelines that allow the production to flow. Since 2009, the Urucu-Manaus pipeline has been operating, connecting the oil province to the capital of Amazonas, with a total length of 663 kilometers. The pipeline is capable of transporting up to 5.5 million cubic meters per day of natural gas from Urucu to the Amazonas capital. In addition, the field accounts for the daily production of approximately 1.2 tons of LPG, a volume capable of supplying seven states in the North region and others in the Northeast.

In the beginning, before the existence of the gas pipeline, it took more than a week to drain the production by small ferries down the Urucu River to the city of Coari, on the banks of the Solimões River and from there, in larger ferries, to the Manaus Refinery (Refinaria de Manaus - Reman).

== Impacts on the local economy ==
The municipality of Coari had the second highest GDP in Amazonas in 2018, with R$2 billion and a 2% share. In 2017 Coari was in fourth position among the state's municipalities, it moved to second position in 2018, where its GDP increase was occasioned by the strong boost from the extractive industry.

== See also ==
- Petrobras
- Amazon
- Urucu-Manaus pipeline
- LPG

== Bibliography ==
- Soares Junior, Emanuel Marçal Cavalcante (2010). A indústria petrolífera e o crescimento econômico do Amazonas (in Portuguese). Universidade Federal do Amazonas (UFAM).
