= Paraná–Uruguaiana pipeline =

Natural gas pipeline

Location
- Country: Argentina, Brazil
- Direction: west–east
- Start: Paraná, Argentina
- To: Uruguaiana, Brazil

General information
- Type: natural gas
- Partners: Techint, Total S.A., Petronas, Compañia General de Combustibles, CMS Energy, Gaspetro, Petroleo Ipiranga, Repsol YPF
- Operator: Transportadora de Gas de Mercosur, Transportadora Sul Brasileira de Gas
- Commissioned: 2000

Technical information
- Length: 451 km (280 mi)
- Maximum discharge: 5.5 billion cubic meter per year

Paraná-Uruguaiana pipeline (also: Transportadora de Gas del Mercosur) is a natural gas pipeline from Aldea Brasilera, Paraná in Argentina to Uruguaiana in Brazil.

== History ==
The pipeline was constructed by Techint. Construction started in August 1999 and the pipeline became operational in July 2000. It was inaugurated by presidents of Brazil and Argentina, Fernando Henrique Cardoso and Fernando de la Rúa on 18 August 2000 at Paso de los Libres.

== Technical description ==
The pipeline length is 451 kilometres (280 mi), of which 25 kilometres (16 mi) is laid in Brazil. It has diameter of 24 inches (610 mm) and it has a capacity of 5.5 billion cubic meter of natural gas per year. The pipeline cost US$250 million.

The pipeline supplies natural gas to a 600-MW power plant in Uruguaiana. There is a plan to extend the pipeline from Uruguaiana to Porto Alegre.

== Operator ==
The Argentine section is operated by Transportadora de Gas de Mercosur. This is a joint venture of Techint, Total S.A., Petronas, Compañia General de Combustibles, and CMS Energy. The Brazilian section is operated by Transportadora Sul Brasileira de Gas, a joint venture of Gaspetro (subsidiary of Petrobras), Petroleo Ipiranga, Repsol YPF, and Techint.

== See also ==
- Cruz del Sur pipeline
- GasAndes Pipeline
- GASENE
- GASBOL
- Yabog pipeline
