= Brazilian Electricity Regulatory Agency =

Brazilian regulatory agency linked to the Ministry of Mines and Energy

The Brazilian Electricity Regulatory Agency (in Portuguese, Agência Nacional de Energia Elétrica, ANEEL) is a regulatory agency of the Government of Brazil linked to the Ministry of Mines and Energy. Founded in 1996, its stated goal is to "provide favorable conditions for the electricity market to develop in a balanced environment amongst agents, for the benefit of society."

== See also ==
- Federal institutions of Brazil
- List of regulatory organizations of Brazil
