= Yabog pipeline =

Natural gas pipeline in Latin America

Location
- Country: Bolivia, Argentina
- Start: Río Grande in Santa Cruz de la Sierra, Bolivia
- To: Campo Duran in Salta Province, Argentina

General information
- Type: natural gas
- Partners: YPFB, TecGas NV, Compañía General de Combustibles S.A., Total S.A., Petronas
- Operator: Transredes, Transportadora de Gas del Norte
- Commissioned: 1972

Technical information
- Length: 441 km (274 mi)
- Maximum discharge: 6.2 billion cubic meter per year

The Yabog (Yacimientos-Bolivian Gulf) pipeline is a natural gas pipeline. It is 441 kilometres (274 mi) long and connects Río Grande in Santa Cruz de la Sierra, Bolivia, with Campo Duran in Salta Province, Argentina. The pipeline was commissioned in 1972.

== History ==
A contract concerning the Yabog pipeline between the Government of Bolivia and oil companies YPFB and Gulf Oil was signed in August 1968. Financing for the project was provided by the World Bank and US private firms. Construction began in 1970, and the pipeline began operating in 1972.

== Technical features ==
The diameter of the pipeline is 24 inches (610 mm) and the annual capacity is 2.19 billion cubic meters. The Bolivian section is operated by Transredes, a subsidiary of YPFB, and the Argentinian section is operated by Transportadora de Gas del Norte, a subsidiary of Gasinvest S.A.

== See also ==
- Gasoducto del Noreste Argentino
- Cruz del Sur pipeline
- GasAndes Pipeline
- Paraná–Uruguaiana pipeline
- Natural gas in Bolivia
