= Urucu–Manaus pipeline =

Natural gas pipeline in Brazil

Location
- Country: Brazil
- Start: Urucu
- Passes through: Coari, Anamã
- To: Manaus

General information
- Type: natural gas
- Partners: Petrobras
- Operator: Transportadora Urucu-Manaus S.A.
- Commissioned: 2009

Technical information
- Length: 661 km (411 mi)
- Maximum discharge: 20 billion cubic meters per year

The Urucu–Manaus pipeline is a natural gas pipeline in Brazil. It allows use of the natural gas from Urucu, which is the largest onshore natural gas reserve in Brazil. The gas is used to substitute diesel and fuel oil for the electricity production in the state of Amazonas, and the pipeline supplies cities of Coari, Codajás, Anori, Anamã, Caapiranga, Manacapuru, Iranduba, and Manaus. The pipeline was inaugurated on 26 November 2009, and it is operated by Transportadora Urucu-Manaus S.A., a subsidiary of Petrobras.

== Sections ==
The 661-kilometre (411 mi) long pipeline consists of three sections. As a first section, the liquefied petroleum gas (LPG) pipeline from the production facility in Urucu to Coari was switched to carrying natural gas, while parallel to this a new 285-kilometre (177 mi) long 10 inches (250 mm) LPG (GLPduto) pipeline was constructed. The second section connects Coari and Anamã and third section connects Anamã-Manaus. In addition to the main trunkline, the pipeline has seven branches.

== Technical features ==
The construction of the pipeline was completed in October 2009. In the first stage of its operation, the pipeline is transporting 17 billion cubic meters (bcm) of natural gas per year. The initial capacity of the pipeline is 20 bcm of natural gas per year.

== See also ==
- Urucu Oil Province
