= Coari =

Municipality of Amazonas, Brazil

- Municipality
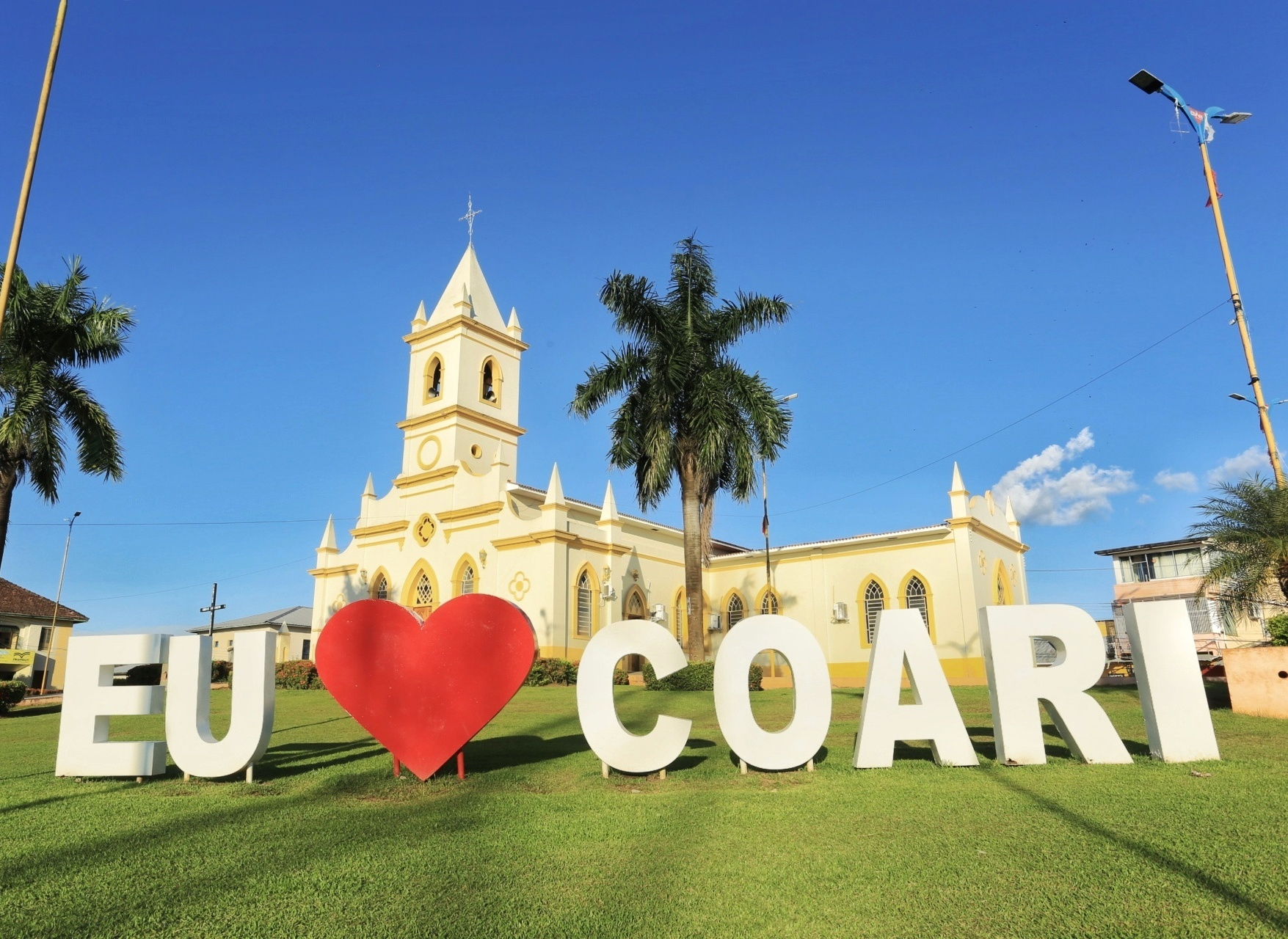

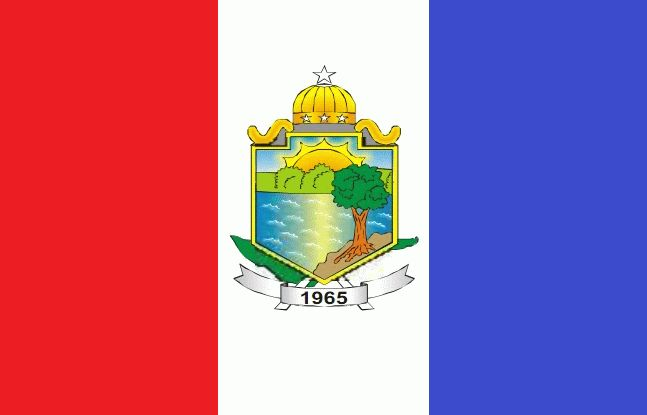
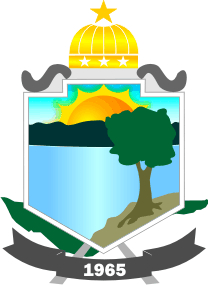
- Flag Coat of arms
- Nickname: "Solimões Queen" "Gas City"
- Coari municipality (red) in Amazonas state
- Coordinates: 04°05′06″S 63°08′27″W
- Country: Brazil
- Region: North
- State: Amazonas
- Established: 1 May 1874

Government
  - Mayor: Manoel Adail Amaral Pinheiro (PRP)

Area
  - Municipality: 57,921.646 km^{2} (22,363.673 sq mi)
- Elevation: 40 m (130 ft)

Population (2020)
  - Metro: 85,910
- Time zone: UTC−4 (AMT)
- ZIP code: 69460-000
- Climate: Af
- Website: www.coari.am.gov.br

Coari (Choary) is a municipality located in the Brazilian state of Amazonas.

== Geography ==
The municipal seat of Coari is one of the largest cities of the Amazonas state. It is the seat of the Roman Catholic Diocese of Coari. The area has reserves of oil and natural gas. Coari is served by Coari Airport located 6 km from downtown Coari. Porto Urucu Airport located in the district of Porto Urucu 470 km away serves the population residing and working for Petrobras.

The municipality is in the Juruá-Purus moist forests ecoregion. It contains part of the Amanã Sustainable Development Reserve. It contains a small portion of the 1,008,167-hectare (2,491,230-acre) Piagaçu-Purus Sustainable Development Reserve, established in 2003. The municipality contains 66.15% of the 217,486-hectare (537,420-acre) Catuá-Ipixuna Extractive Reserve, established in 2003 as the first extractive reserve in the state of Amazonas.

=== Climate ===
Climate data for Coari (1981–2010, extremes 1961–present)
Month	Jan	Feb	Mar	Apr	May	Jun	Jul	Aug	Sep	Oct	Nov	Dec	Year
Record high °C (°F)	36.9 (98.4)	36.6 (97.9)	36.4 (97.5)	36.4 (97.5)	36.0 (96.8)	38.0 (100.4)	39.8 (103.6)	37.5 (99.5)	38.3 (100.9)	38.2 (100.8)	38.3 (100.9)	38.2 (100.8)	39.8 (103.6)
Mean daily maximum °C (°F)	31.8 (89.2)	31.9 (89.4)	32.0 (89.6)	31.9 (89.4)	31.7 (89.1)	31.7 (89.1)	32.2 (90.0)	33.2 (91.8)	33.3 (91.9)	33.2 (91.8)	32.6 (90.7)	32.1 (89.8)	32.3 (90.1)
Daily mean °C (°F)	26.4 (79.5)	26.4 (79.5)	26.6 (79.9)	26.6 (79.9)	26.6 (79.9)	26.4 (79.5)	26.8 (80.2)	27.4 (81.3)	27.4 (81.3)	27.3 (81.1)	27.0 (80.6)	26.8 (80.2)	26.8 (80.2)
Mean daily minimum °C (°F)	21.6 (70.9)	21.8 (71.2)	22.0 (71.6)	22.0 (71.6)	22.1 (71.8)	21.9 (71.4)	21.9 (71.4)	22.2 (72.0)	22.3 (72.1)	22.4 (72.3)	22.4 (72.3)	22.2 (72.0)	22.1 (71.8)
Record low °C (°F)	14.6 (58.3)	15.4 (59.7)	10.6 (51.1)	15.6 (60.1)	14.0 (57.2)	10.2 (50.4)	11.0 (51.8)	14.8 (58.6)	15.0 (59.0)	15.7 (60.3)	16.4 (61.5)	15.2 (59.4)	10.2 (50.4)
Average precipitation mm (inches)	264.5 (10.41)	265.5 (10.45)	322.3 (12.69)	272.4 (10.72)	213.1 (8.39)	128.9 (5.07)	87.2 (3.43)	68.9 (2.71)	100.4 (3.95)	156.7 (6.17)	215.6 (8.49)	261.7 (10.30)	2,357.2 (92.80)
Average precipitation days (≥ 1.0 mm)	18	17	18	17	16	13	9	8	9	12	13	16	166
Average relative humidity (%)	85.6	84.9	84.9	85.0	85.1	83.9	80.8	78.1	78.8	79.7	81.9	83.6	82.7
Mean monthly sunshine hours	138.2	120.2	122.0	132.5	152.5	171.2	207.1	208.8	180.4	171.7	141.1	143.1	1,888.8
Source 1: Instituto Nacional de Meteorologia
Source 2: Meteo Climat (record highs and lows)
