= GASENE =

Natural gas pipeline system in Brazil

Location
- Country: Brazil
- State: Rio de Janeiro, Espírito Santo, Paraíba, Bahia
- Start: Rio de Janeiro
- Passes through: Vitória, Cacimbas
- To: Catu, Bahia

General information
- Type: natural gas
- Operator: Transportadora GASENE S.A. (Petrobras)
- Commissioned: 2010

Technical information
- Length: 1,387 km (862 mi)
- Maximum discharge: 7.5 billion cubic meter
- Diameter: 28 in (711 mm)

The Southeast Northeast Interconnection Gas Pipeline (GASENE) is a 1,387 kilometres (862 mi) natural gas pipeline system in Brazil, which connects south-eastern gas system to the north-eastern gas system. It creates a common gas market in Brazil and allows gas import from Bahia. The project company of the GASENE system is Transportadora GASENE S.A., a subsidiary of Petrobras.

== Pipeline sections ==
GASENE starts from the Cabiúnas Terminal in Rio de Janeiro and runs to the city of Catu in Bahia. The project comprises the following sections:

- Cabiúnas - Vitória (GASCAV)
- Vitória - Cacimbas
- Cacimbas – Catu (GASCAC)

=== GASCAV pipeline ===
The Cabiúnas-Vitória pipeline is a 303 kilometres (188 mi) long pipeline with a 28 inches (710 mm) nominal diameter and maximum capacity of 7.5 billion cubic meter (bcm) of gas per year. This section has two compressor stations. It is interconnected by 10 kilometres (6.2 mi) long branch line with Anchieta. This section was designed and constructed by Chinese oil company Sinopec. The Cabiúnas-Vitória section was completed at the end of 2007.

=== Vitória - Cacimbas pipeline ===
Vitória – Cacimbas section is a 125 kilometres (78 mi) long pipeline, which was completed in the second half of 2007.

=== GASCAC pipeline ===
The construction of Cacimbas - Catu pipeline started in May 2008 and it was completed in 2010. It is 974 kilometres (605 mi) long. The pipe has a 28 inches (710 mm) nominal diameter and it has one compressor station. The pipeline was designed, engineered, and built by Sinopec and financed by China Development Bank.
