= GASBOL =

Location
- Country: Bolivia; Brazil
- Start: Rio Grande, Bolivia
- Passes through: Corumbá; Campinas
- To: Guararema and Canoas

General information
- Type: Natural gas
- Operator: Gas Transboliviano S.A. Transportadora Brasileira Gasoduto Bolivia-Brazil S.A.
- Commissioned: 1999 (stage 1); 2000 (stage 2)

Technical information
- Length: 3,150 km (1,960 mi)
- Maximum discharge: 11×10^{9} m^{3}/a (390×10^{9} cu ft/a)
- Diameter: 16–32 in (406–813 mm)

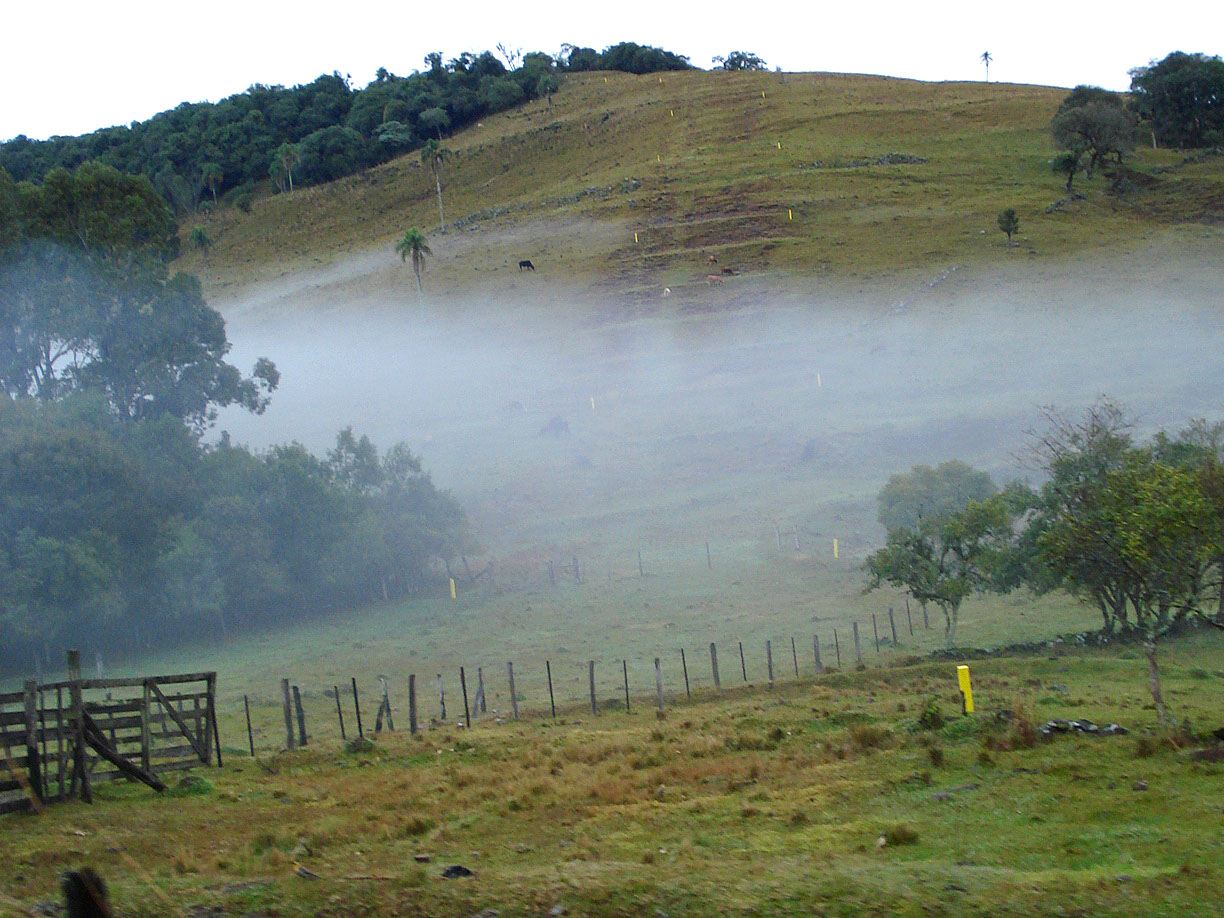

The Bolivia–Brazil pipeline (GASBOL) is the longest natural gas pipeline in South America. The 3,150 kilometres (1,960 mi) pipeline connects Bolivia's gas sources with the south-east regions of Brazil.

The pipeline was built in two stages. The first 1,418 kilometres (881 mi) long stretch, with a diameter varying from 24 to 32 inches (610 to 810 mm), started operation in June 1999. It runs from Rio Grande, near Santa Cruz de la Sierra, to Corumbá in Mato Grosso do Sul, reaches Campinas in the state of São Paulo, and continues to Guararema, where it's connected with the Brazilian network. The second 1,165 kilometres (724 mi) long stretch, with a diameter varying from 16 to 24 inches (410 to 610 mm), which links Campinas to Canoas, near Porto Alegre in Rio Grande do Sul, was completed in March 2000.

The maximum capacity of the pipeline is 11 billion cubic metres per annum (390 billion cubic feet per annum) of natural gas. The total cost of the pipeline was US$2.15 billion, of which US$1.72 billion was spent on the Brazilian section and US$435 million on the Bolivian section.
